= 2023 Tyumen Oblast gubernatorial election =

- 10 September 2023
- Turnout: 50.72%
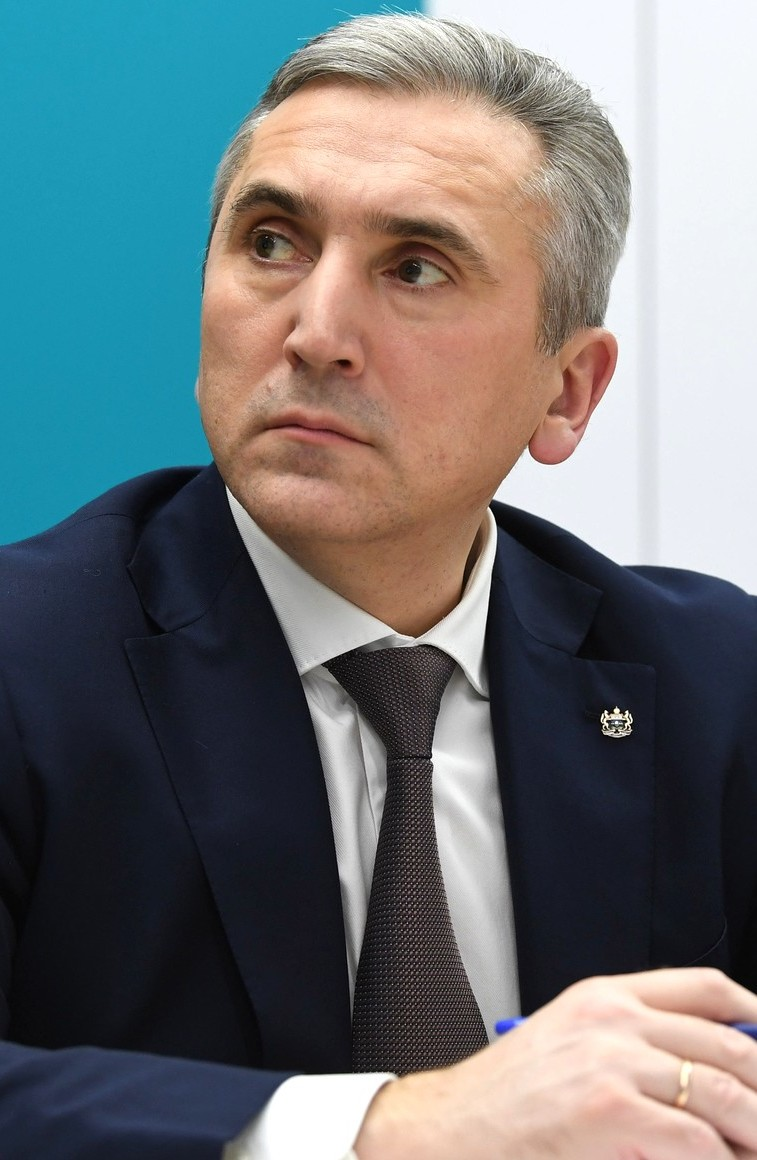
		LDPR	CPRF
Candidate	Aleksandr Moor	Denis Sadovnikov	Ivan Levchenko
Party	United Russia	LDPR	CPRF
Popular vote	1,069,735	112,126	107,660
Percentage	78.77%	8.26%	7.93%
Governor before election
Aleksandr Moor
United Russia
Elected Governor
Aleksandr Moor
United Russia

The 2023 Tyumen Oblast gubernatorial election took place on 10 September 2023, on common election day. Incumbent Governor Aleksandr Moor was re-elected to a second term in office.

== Background ==
In May 2018 3-term Governor of Tyumen Oblast Vladimir Yakushev was appointed to the Government of Russia, becoming Minister of Construction, Housing and Utilities. Vice Governor Sergey Sarychev was acting Governor until 29 May, when President Vladimir Putin appointed Tyumen mayor Aleksandr Moor to lead the region. Moor won the subsequent gubernatorial election in September 2018 with 65.9% of the vote.

== Candidates ==
In Tyumen Oblast candidates for Governor can be nominated only by registered political parties, self-nomination is not possible. However, candidates are not obliged to be members of the nominating party. Candidate for Governor of Tyumen Oblast should be a Russian citizen and at least 30 years old. Candidates for Governor should not have a foreign citizenship or residence permit. Each candidate in order to be registered is required to collect at least 7% of signatures of members and heads of municipalities. Also gubernatorial candidates present 3 candidacies to the Federation Council and election winner later appoints one of the presented candidates.

=== Registered ===
- Ivan Levchenko (CPRF), Member of Tyumen Oblast Duma (2016–present), 2018 gubernatorial candidate
- Aleksandr Moor (United Russia), incumbent Governor of Tyumen Oblast (2018–present)
- Vladimir Piskaykin (SR–ZP), Member of Tyumen Oblast Duma (2008–present), 2014 and 2018 gubernatorial candidate
- Denis Sadovnikov (LDPR), Member of Legislative Assembly of the Yamalo-Nenets Autonomous Okrug (2020–present), former Member of Tyumen Oblast Duma (2016–2020)

=== Eliminated in United Russia primary ===
- Vladimir Fomin, Member of Tyumen Oblast Duma (2011, 2021–present)
- Vladimir Pushkarev, Member of Tyumen Oblast Duma (2021–present), former Member of State Duma (2016–2021)

=== Declined ===
- Vyacheslav Malyugin (CPRF), physical education teacher, cycling activist
- Yevgeny Markov (LDPR), Member of State Duma (2019–present)
- Aleksey Savintsev (CPRF), Member of Duma of Khanty-Mansi Autonomous Okrug (2016–present)
- Gleb Trubin (LDPR), Member of Tyumen Oblast Duma (2011–present)
- Ivan Vershinin (LDPR), Member of Tyumen Oblast Duma (2021–present)
- Vladimir Zinovyev (RPPSS), Member of Duma of Khanty-Mansi Autonomous Okrug (2006–2011, 2021–present)

=== Candidates for Federation Council ===
- Ivan Levchenko (CPRF):
  - Oleg Galchenko, Member of Tyumen Oblast Duma (2021–present), bankruptcy trustee
  - Aleksandr Izotov, aide to Tyumen Oblast Duma member
  - Grigory Karmelyuk, aide to Tyumen Oblast Duma member
- Aleksandr Moor (United Russia):
  - Sergey Medvedev, Member of Tyumen Oblast Duma (2011–present)
  - Pavel Tarakanov, incumbent Senator from Tyumen Oblast (2018–present)
  - Vladimir Ulyanov, Member of Tyumen Oblast Duma (2011–present)
- Vladimir Piskaykin (SR–ZP):
  - Georgy Ergemlidze, aide to Tyumen Oblast Duma member, retired police lieutenant
  - Arkady Liberman, aide to State Duma member, political scientist
  - Sergey Morev, former Member of Tyumen Oblast Duma (2016–2021)
- Denis Sadovnikov (LDPR):
  - Yevgeny Dannikov, Member of Duma of Khanty-Mansi Autonomous Okrug (2019–present)
  - Andrey Kuznetsov, consultant of LDPR faction in the Legislative Assembly of the Yamalo-Nenets Autonomous Okrug
  - Gleb Trubin, Member of Tyumen Oblast Duma (2011–present)

== Results ==
Summary of the 10 September 2023 Tyumen Oblast gubernatorial election results
Candidate	Party	Votes	%
Aleksandr Moor (incumbent)	United Russia	1,069,735	78.77
Denis Sadovnikov	Liberal Democratic Party	112,126	8.26
Ivan Levchenko	Communist Party	107,660	7.93
Vladimir Piskaykin	A Just Russia — For Truth	49,203	3.62
Valid votes		1,338,724	98.57
Blank ballots		19,374	1.43
Total		1,358,099	100.00
Turnout		1,358,099	50.72
Registered voters		2,677,382	100.00

Governor Moor re-appointed incumbent Senator Pavel Tarakanov to the Federation Council.

== See also ==
- 2023 Russian regional elections
