= Rosemary Ashton =

Scottish literary scholar

Rosemary Ashton OBE, FBA
- Born: Rosemary Doreen Thomson; 11 April 1947 (age 79); Renfrewshire, Scotland
- Education: University of Aberdeen, Heidelberg University, University of Cambridge
- Occupation: literary scholar
- Known for: creator of the UCL Bloomsbury Project
- Notable work: reception of German literature in British magazines in the early 1800s
- Awards: Fellow of the British Academy, the Royal Society of Literature and the Royal Society of Arts

Rosemary Doreen Ashton, OBE, FBA (née Thomson; born 11 April 1947) is a Scottish literary scholar. From 2002 to 2012, she was the Quain Professor of English Language and Literature at University College London. Her reviews appear in the London Review of Books.

== Education and career ==
Born in Renfrewshire, Scotland, she was educated at the universities of Aberdeen, Heidelberg, and Cambridge, where her doctoral research was on the reception of German literature in British magazines in the early 1800s.

After lecturing at the University of Birmingham, she started her long teaching and research association with UCL in 1974.

She is a Fellow of the British Academy, of the Royal Society of Literature, and of the Royal Society of Arts, and has served on a number of editorial and literary boards, including the George Eliot Fellowship, the advisory board of Carlyle Studies Annual, the advisory board of the Centre for Anglo-German Cultural Relations at Queen Mary, University of London, and the board of the Dr Williams’s Centre for Dissenting Studies. She is a senior research fellow at the Institute of English Studies in the School of Advanced Studies, University of London.

She was the creator of the UCL Bloomsbury Project, which was established to investigate 19th-century Bloomsbury’s development "from swampy rubbish-dump to centre of intellectual life", tracing the origins, Bloomsbury locations, and reforming significance of hundreds of progressive and innovative institutions.

== Honours ==
In the 1999 New Year Honours, Ashton was appointed an Officer of the Order of the British Empire (OBE) "for services to comparative literature". In 2000, she was elected a Fellow of the British Academy (FBA), the United Kingdom's national academy for the humanities and social sciences.

== Works ==
- Ashton, Rosemary. Little Germany: Exile and Asylum in Victorian England. Oxford University Press, 1986. ISBN 9780192122391
- Ashton, Rosemary. G.H. Lewes: An Unconventional Victorian. Pimlico, 1991, ISBN 9780712666893
- Ashton, Rosemary, ed. George Eliot, Middlemarch. Penguin, 1994. ISBN 9780140433883 (16-page introduction and 15 pages of notes)
- Ashton, Rosemary. George Eliot: A Life. Penguin Books, 1996. ISBN 9780140242911
- Ashton, Rosemary. 142 Strand: A Radical Address in Victorian London. Random House UK, 2006. ISBN 9780701173708
- Ashton, Rosemary. Victorian Bloomsbury. Yale University Press, 2012. ISBN 9780300154481
- Ashton, Rosemary. One Hot Summer: Dickens, Darwin, Disraeli, and the Great Stink of 1858. Yale University Press, 2017. ISBN 9780300227260
