= Alexander Men =

Russian Orthodox priest and human-rights activist (1935 – 1990)

Father Alexander Men
- Александр Владимирович Мень
- Title: Pastor

Personal life
- Born: 22 January 1935 Moscow, Russian SFSR, Soviet Union
- Died: 9 September 1990 (aged 55) Semkhoz, Russian SFSR, Soviet Union
- Cause of death: Assassination
- Spouse: Natasha Grigorienko
- Parent(s): Vladimir Men, Yelena Tsuperfeyn
- Education: Leningrad Theological Seminary; Moscow Theological Academy
- Website: http://www.alexandrmen.ru/

Religious life
- Religion: Christianity
- Denomination: Eastern Orthodoxy
- Church: Russian Orthodox Church
- Ordination: 1 September 1960

Senior posting
- Based in: Novaya Derevnya
- Period in office: 1970 - 9 September 1990
- Reason for exit: Assassinated
- Students: Georgy Chistyakov Gleb Yakunin

Alexander Vladimirovich Men (Russian: Алекса́ндр Влади́мирович Мень, romanized: Aleksandr Vladimirovich Men'; 22 January 1935 – 9 September 1990) was a Soviet Russian Orthodox Church priest, Soviet dissident, scholar of theology and the Bible, and author of works on theology, history of religion, the fundamentals of Christian doctrine, and Orthodox worship.

He wrote dozens of books, including his magnum opus, History of Religion: In Search of the Way, the Truth and the Life (from 1970 onward). Its seventh volume, Son of Man (1969) introduced Christianity to thousands of Soviet citizens. He baptized hundreds of people, founded an Orthodox open university in 1990, established one of the first Sunday schools in the USSR, and created a charity group supporting the Russian Children's Hospital.

Men was murdered on the morning of Sunday, 9 September 1990, by an unknown number of assailants outside his home in Semkhoz, located in the Sergiyevo-Posadsky District of Moscow Oblast, Russia. The circumstances of the murder remain unclear.

== Early life and education ==
=== Background ===
Men's father, Volf Gersh-Leibovich (Vladimir Grigoryevich) Men, was born in Kyiv in 1902. Volf attended a religious Jewish school as a child but did not practice religion later in life. He graduated from two universities and worked as the chief engineer of a textile factory.

Men's maternal ancestors, originally from Poland, had lived in Russia since the 18th century. His grandmother, Cecilia Vasilevskaya, and grandfather, Odessa resident Semyon (Solomon) Ilyich Tsuperfein, met in Switzerland while studying chemistry at the University of Bern. Their daughter Yelena (Alexander's mother) was born in Bern in 1908. After graduating, Semyon, Cecilia, and their daughter lived in Paris. In 1914, during a visit to Russia, Semyon was mobilized, and the family settled in Kharkov. Yelena Semyonovna Men (née Tsuperfein) was drawn to Christianity from a young age and studied the Orthodox faith at a private gymnasium in Kharkov. As a high school student, she moved to Moscow to live with her grandmother Anna Osipovna Vasilevskaya. In 1934, she married Volf.

=== Early life ===
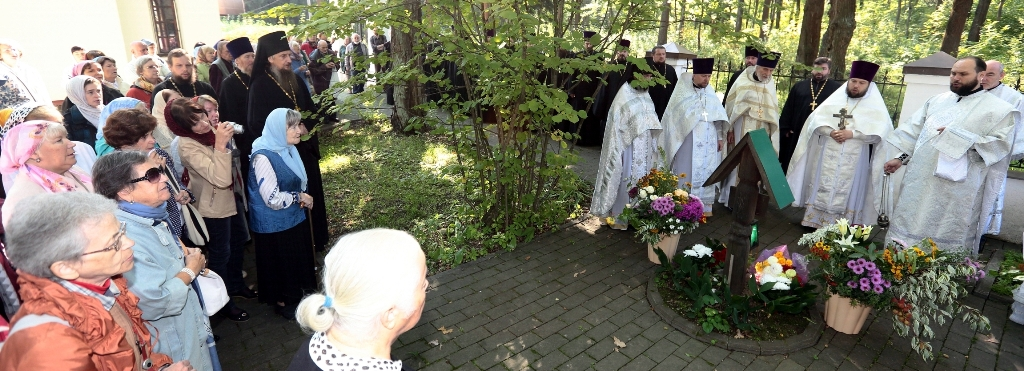
Memorial Day of Archpriest Alexander Men in Sergiyev Posad

Men was born in Moscow to a Jewish family on 22 January 1935. When he was aged six months, he and his mother were secretly baptized in Zagorsk by Archimandrite Seraphim (Bityukov) of the banned Catacomb Church, a branch of the Russian Orthodox Church that refused to cooperate with Soviet authorities.

When Men was six years old, his father was arrested by the NKVD. His father spent over a year in custody and was then assigned to labor in the Ural Mountains. Men studied at the Moscow Fur Institute in 1955 and transferred to Irkutsk Agricultural Institute, from which he was expelled in 1958 due to his religious beliefs. On 1 June 1958, one month after his expulsion, he was ordained a deacon and sent to the parish of the Intercession of the Most Holy Theotokos in Akulovo.

== Priesthood ==
On 1 September 1960, Men became a priest after graduating from the Leningrad Theological Seminary. His consecration took place at the Donskoi Monastery. Men was appointed second priest in the Church of the Intercession of the Blessed Virgin Mary in Petrovskoye-Alabin, where he became rector a year later. In 1965, he completed his studies at Moscow Theological Academy.

In 1964 and 1965, Father Alexander was investigated due to his acquaintance with Aleksandr Solzhenitsyn. Men became an influential leader with a good reputation among Christians, both locally and abroad, including those in the Roman Catholic, Protestant, and Orthodox faith. He served in several parishes near Moscow. During the 1960s, Men was a pioneer of Christian "samizdat" (self-publishing). From the early 1970s, Men became a popular figure in Russia's religious community, especially among the intelligentsia. The KGB targeted Men for his active missionary and evangelistic efforts. In 1974, Yuri Andropov wrote to the Central Committee of the Communist Party of the Soviet Union about the "ideological struggle of the Vatican against the USSR," stating: "A group of pro-Catholic-minded priests, headed by A. Men (Moscow Oblast), pushes the idea in their theological works that only Catholicism can be the ideal of church life. These works, illegally exported abroad, are published by the Catholic publishing house Life with God (Belgium) and are then sent for distribution in the USSR."

In 1984, Men was interrogated in connection with his student Sergei Marcus; during these interrogations, Men was threatened with a ban from serving in any of the Moscow parishes. An article in the Trud newspaper in the spring of 1986 accused him of attempting to create an "anti-Soviet underground" under the auspices of Archpriest John Meyendorff; organizing "illegal religious matinees"; and personally voicing "slide films of a religious propaganda nature, which he illegally distributed among believers."

On 11 May 1988, Men's first public lecture took place in the hall of the Institute of Steel and Alloys. Alexander Kravetsky noted that "the organizers were completely amazed that a church theme could attract a full hall without any advertising." In the late 1980s, he used mass media to proselytize and was offered a nationally televised program on religion.

Men was one of the founders of the Russian Bible Society in 1990; that same year, he founded the Open Orthodox University and "The World of the Bible" journal. His efforts to educate the Russian populace about the Orthodox faith led the Soviet newspaper Sotsialisticheskaya Industriya to label him a modern-day apostle to the Soviet intelligentsia. However, some representatives of Orthodox Christianity have stated that several of Men's views were not sufficiently "orthodox" and advised against using his books as an introduction to Orthodoxy.

Men actively supported charitable activities, attending the founding of the Mercy Group at the Russian Children's Clinical Hospital, which was later named after him.

== Murder ==
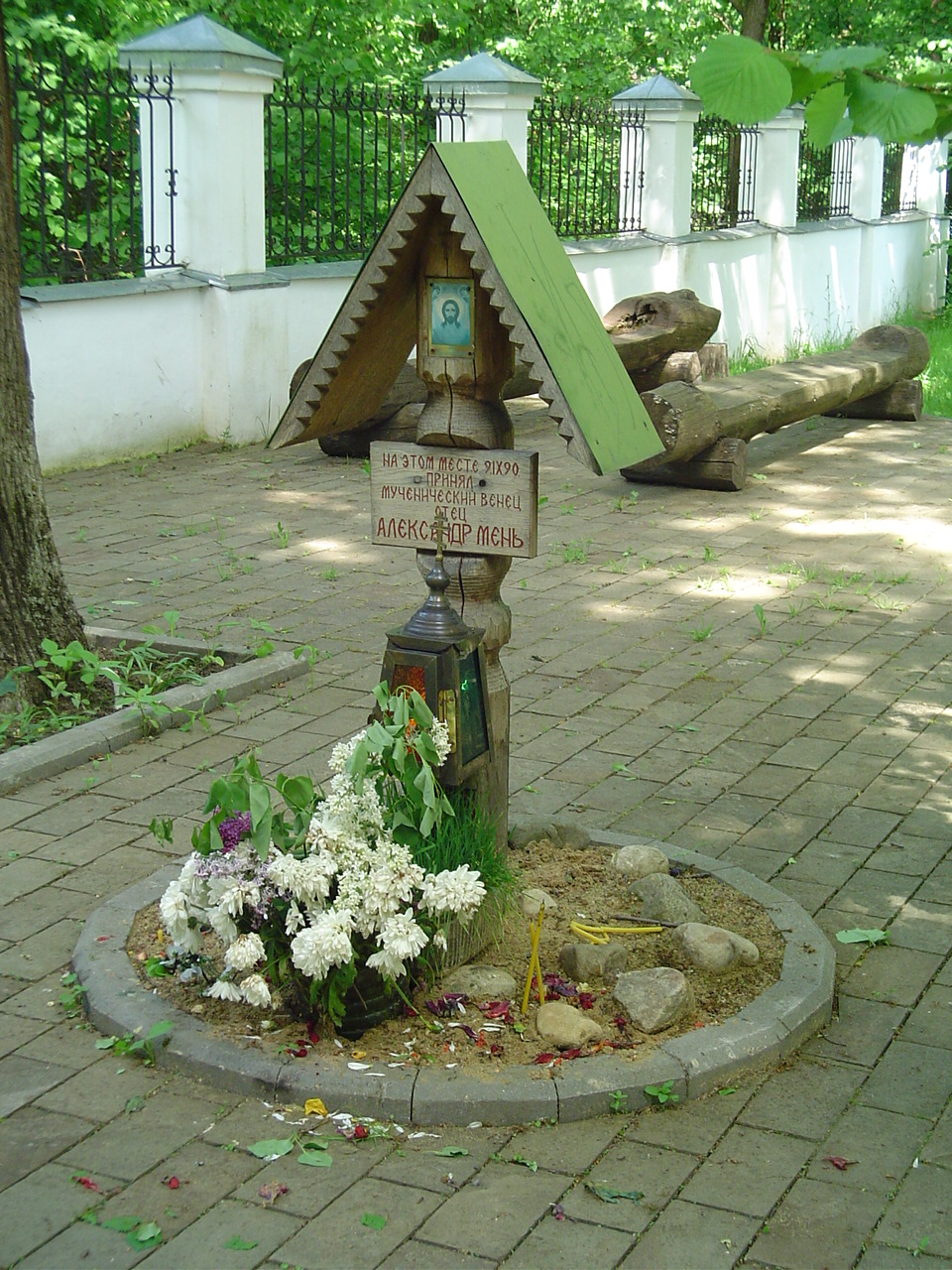
Alexander Men memorial cross at his murder site in Semkhoz

On the morning of Sunday, 9 September 1990, Men was murdered with an axe while walking along the wooded path from his home in the Russian village of Semkhoz (near Moscow) to the local train platform, on his way to catch the train to Novaya Derevnya to celebrate the Divine Liturgy. Men had served at the parish in Novaya Derevnya for 20 years. The murder occurred around the time of the dissolution of the Soviet Union, and despite orders from within the Soviet (and later the Russian) government that the case be further investigated, it remains unsolved. The assailant, or assailants, was/were not identified. Men's funeral was held on 11 September 1990, the day in the Orthodox calendar that commemorates the beheading of John the Baptist.

According to Lieutenant General of Police Vyacheslav Pankin:

When the suspect was detained, he confessed. Minister of Internal Affairs Barannikov was delighted: we could celebrate! However, apart from confessions, there was no material evidence. And even when the suspect gave investigators the axe with which he allegedly killed the priest, the examination did not confirm that it was the murder weapon. The briefcase with the priest's vestments also disappeared. We worked through a lot of versions, paying attention to the little things. When the priest, with a head wound, reached the gate of his house and hung helplessly on it, his wife did not recognize him. Why? We also checked the wife's brother, who had a conflict with Men on the eve of the murder. However, it was not possible to obtain significant evidence. Already in Afghanistan, I heard that the crime had allegedly been solved. This was reported by the then head of the Main Directorate of Criminal Investigation, Kolesnikov. But they still worked with the same suspects.

—

== Views and thought ==
According to Men, "The history of world religiosity begins not with Christianity but much earlier. Christianity is the highest point in the development of religious experience."

Men positioned his attitude towards antiquity and paganism as Christian: "Even in paganism, you will find a presentiment and anticipation of the Good News. It is not for nothing that the Apostle Paul made the altar of the 'Unknown God' the starting point of his sermon in Athens. However, this kind of dialogue will often be replaced by a compromise with aspects of ancient beliefs that are alien to the Gospel."

== Works ==
Men's most significant work is his History of Religion, published in seven volumes under the title In Search of the Way, the Truth, and the Life (volumes 1–6, Brussels, 1970–1983; 2nd edition Moscow, 1991–1992). In it, he examines the history of non-Christian religions as a path for Christians in the struggle between Magiism and Monotheism. The seventh volume is his most famous work, Son of Man (Brussels, 1969; 2nd edition Moscow, 1991). Due to persecution in the Soviet Union, the Brussels editions were published under a pseudonym.

An English translation of Son of Man by Mormon author Samuel Brown was completed in 1998 but is now out of print, as are several other works in English translation. In 2014, Alastair Macnaughton (1954–2017), an Anglican priest and Russian scholar, began a project to translate the entire History of Religion into English for the first time. Volume 1 was published in 2018. An abridged version of the entire History of Religion in Two Volumes was also translated into English in 2021 and includes the history of Christianity of the first millennium. Recent works by Men in English translation include:

- "An Inner Step Toward God: Writings and teachings on Prayer", (2014) ISBN 978-1612612386;
- "Russian Religious Philosophy: 1989–1990 Lectures" (2015) ISBN 978-0996399227 (in 25th Year Memory Commemoration).
- "The Wellsprings of Religion. The History of Religion: In Search of the Way, the Truth, and the Life Vol 1", Trans. Alastair Macnaughton. (2018) ISBN 978-0881416039
- "History of Religion in Two Volumes" (2021). Volume 1 surveys humanity's spiritual search from ancient times to the coming of Christ, and Volume 2 is an overview of the history of the Church in the first millennium.

Many other works by Men have been published in Russian, most notably:

- Heaven on Earth (1969), published abroad under a pseudonym, later reissued in Russia;
- "Where Did This All Come From?" (1972), published abroad under pseudonym, later reissued in Russia;
- "How to Read the Bible?" (1981), published abroad under pseudonym, later reissued in Russia;
- "World Spiritual Culture" (1995);
- "The History of Religions" (Volumes 1–2, 1997);
- "The First Apostles" (1998);
- "Isagogics: Old and New Testaments" (2000);
- "Bibliological Dictionary" (Volumes 1–3, 2002).
- "Mystery, Word, Image" (Brussels, 1980, 2nd edition. M.1991), published abroad under a pseudonym.

== Legacy ==
Since his death, Men's works and ideas have been viewed as controversial among the conservative faction of the Russian Orthodox Church due to his strong tendencies towards ecumenism, which his books advocate. Nevertheless, Men has a considerable number of supporters, some of whom advocate for his canonization. His lectures are regularly broadcast over Russian radio. His books are no longer restricted from print in Russia; during his lifetime, they had to be printed abroad, mainly in Brussels, Belgium, by the publishing house Foyer Chrétien Oriental and circulated in secret. Several key Russian Orthodox parishes encourage following his example as one who faithfully followed Christ. Two Russian Orthodox churches have been built on the site of his assassination, and a growing number of believers in both Russia and abroad consider him a martyr.

In December 1990, the Alexander Men Foundation was founded in Riga. Men was canonized by the Apostolic Orthodox Church in 2004.

In conjunction with the 25th year Commemoration of Memory, the Moscow Patriarchate Izdatel'stvo publishing house has begun a project to publish Fr. Men's "Collected Works" in a series of 15 volumes.

Men's son, Mikhail Men, is a Russian political figure who served as the Governor of Ivanovo Oblast from 2005 to 2013 and subsequently as Minister of Construction Industry, Housing and Utilities Sector in Dmitry Medvedev's Cabinet. He is also a musician known outside Russia for the Michael Men Project.

=== Views on Men's work ===
==== Positive ====
Many Orthodox people positively evaluate Men's activities and works. In 2010, Arkady Mahler noted: "The number of people who came to the Russian Orthodox Church of the Moscow Patriarchate thanks to the sermons of Father Alexander Men is always greater than we can imagine. Many of them now admit, in a half-whisper, "in fact, it was Men who brought me to the Church from the very beginning," and look away, as if apologizing for something. Moreover, we are talking not only about the "intelligentsia" - Father Alexander was a real people's preacher; quite ordinary people from all over the Soviet empire sought him out because it was from his texts, randomly found among acquaintances of their acquaintances, that they first learned about God."

Archpriest Andrei Tkachev assessed Men's work positively: "Men was great: he took on the heaviest burden - working with atheistic intellectuals." In February 2021, Metropolitan Hilarion (Alfeyev) allowed the canonization of Men: "Father Alexander Men was an outstanding preacher, catechist, and missionary of his time. His death was tragic, and I think that if it is proven that it was martyrdom, he can be canonized as a martyr."

==== Criticism ====
At the same time, many representatives of the Russian Orthodox Church argue that some of Men's statements contradict the fundamentals of Orthodox teaching; his ecumenical views were criticized. He was also accused of sympathizing with Catholicism. Orthodox theologian Alexei Osipov and Protodeacon Andrey Kuraev did not recommend Men's books for those seeking to become acquainted with Orthodoxy.

This is the fate of the missionary: one who speaks the language of his contemporary culture finds himself too outdated when that culture passes away. Today, we live in a different world. Triumphant atheism was replaced by triumphant occultism. <…> Everyone is playing with beads with words like "karma", "horoscope", "astral", "cosmic ray". Almost all the religions of the world came to our home and unanimously declared Christianity "obsolete." And here, a completely different intonation turned out to be necessary, not the one that was in the books of Father Alexander Men. When the islands of Christianity are threatened to be swallowed up by the occult element, there is no time to search for "things in common." It's time to draw boundaries, dividing lines. Time for conflict. Christ is not only the One Whom "all nations await." He is also the One Whom the priests of all popular religions rejected. For the Jews, he was a scandal (σκανδαλον) and for the Hellenes, he is madness.

— Protodeacon Andrey Kuraev on the ecumenism of Alexander Men and an Orthodox attitude to this ecumenism (from the article "Alexander Men: the lost missionary")

An open letter to Men, allegedly written by Metropolitan Anthony (Melnikov), states: "You are not new to the church, Father Alexander ... This means that, in your interpretation, when you combine the One God of Christians and Ancient Israel with the "god" of modern Judaism, the devil, you are doing this deliberately, deliberately mixing light with darkness."

Priest Daniel Sysoev was sharply critical of Men. In 2002, he identified 9 points in his creed that he considered heretical: "Manichaeism — the doctrine of the complicity of Satan in the creation of the world, the result of which was the supposed evolution that took place", "the doctrine of man as a transfigured ape", "the rejection of the inspiration of the Holy Scriptures", "the rejection of original sin and the postulation of the independence of death from human sin", "the rejection of the existence of a personal Adam and the introduction of the Kabbalistic doctrine of Adam Kadmon", "the rejection of the authorship of almost all Old Testament books", "acceptance of branch theory", "syncretism", "encouragement of magic and extrasensory perception".

Metropolitan Hilarion (Alfeyev), on the Church and the World program aired on the Russia-24 channel on 13 February 2021, stated that Men's works contain controversial views but that this is not an obstacle to Men's canonization:

Father Alexander Men was an outstanding preacher, catechist, and missionary of his time. His life took place in difficult conditions, when the Church was deprived of the opportunity to preach outside churches. He also preached in his church, where he served as a priest until the end of his days. He preached through books, and in his later years, as new opportunities opened up, he preached in secular audiences. His death was tragic. I think that if it is proven that it was a martyr's death, he can be canonized as a martyr. He, of course, considered Jesus Christ the Son of God and was an Orthodox clergyman who professed the Orthodox Creed. However, in his books, you can find controversial views. For example, in some of his books, he drew parallels between Christianity and other religions, and these parallels created the impression that there was much more in common between Christianity and other religions than there actually was. Father Alexander Men's breadth of views confused readers then, and continues to confuse them now.

—

Men's views on himself

Despite the controversy surrounding Men, he seemed to view himself and his work simply and humbly. In a letter to a friend shortly before his death, Men wrote, "I work now as I have always worked: with my face into the wind ... I'm only an instrument that God is using for the moment. Afterwards, things will be as God wants them."

== See also ==
- Georgy Chistyakov
- List of unsolved murders (1980–1999)
