= Sergey Smetanyuk =

Russian politician

- Сергей Сметанюк
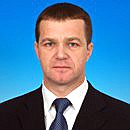
- Official portrait, 2008

Deputy Plenipotentiary Representative in the Ural Federal District
- In office January 2010 – November 2012

Member of the State Duma
- In office 2 December 2007 – January 2010

Head of the Tyumen City Administration
- In office 22 December 2005 – 10 May 2007
- Preceded by: Vladimir Yakushev
- Succeeded by: Yevgeny Kuyvashev

Governor of Tyumen Oblast (acting)
- In office 14 November 2005 – 22 November 2005
- Preceded by: Sergey Sobyanin
- Succeeded by: Vladimir Yakushev

Personal details
- Born: Sergey Ivanovich Smetanyuk; 8 June 1962 (age 64) Dashiv, Vinnytsia Oblast, Ukrainian SSR, Soviet Union
- Party: United Russia
- Spouse: Olga Olegovna

Sergey Ivanovich Smetanyuk (Russian: Сергей Иванович Сметанюк; born 8 June 1962) is a Ukrainian-born Russian politician who lasted served as the acting Governor of Tyumen Oblast in November 2005, and the head of the Tyumen administration from 2005 to 2007. He is currently the deputy general director of Transneft-Siberia, JSC. He was the Member of the Scientific and Editorial Council of the Big Tyumen Encyclopedia (2004).

== Biography ==
Sergey Smetanyuk was born on 8 June 1962, in the village of Dashiv, in Ukraine. He graduated with honors from the Nemirovsky Construction College. He worked as a construction site foreman. In 1981 he was drafted into the Soviet Army.

He served in Blagoveshchensk. In the political department of the division, he received a referral to study at the Higher Komsomol School at the Central Committee of the Komsomol.

He was sent to the Tyumen Oblast as a commander of a student construction detachment. He worked on the development of the Medvezhye gas field and the construction of residential buildings for gas workers in the village of Pangody. After graduation, he was assigned to the Tyumen Regional Committee of the Komsomol.

In 1988, he was elected first secretary of the Komsomol organization of the Leninsky district of Tyumen.

In 1990, he was the Deputy Head of the Administration of the Leninsky District of Tyumen.

In 1996, he won the elections to the Tyumen City Duma and was elected its chairman.

In 1998 he completed his postgraduate studies at the Russian Academy of Public Administration under the President of the Russia, defended his dissertation and received the degree of candidate of sociology. In 1999 he received a law degree from Tyumen State University.

In August 2000, Smetanyuk was appointed chief federal inspector in the Tyumen Oblast of the Office of the Plenipotentiary Representative in the Ural Federal District.

On 27 March 2005, Smetanyuk was Vice Governor of the Tyumen Oblast. On 14 November 2005, after the transfer of Governor Sergey Sobyanin to the post of head of the Presidential Administration of the Russian Federation, Smetanyuk was acting governor for 10 days.

On 21 December 2005, Smetanyuk was elected the head of Tyumen. In 2007, he briefly returned to the regional administration, becoming the First Deputy Governor. On 2 December 2007 he was elected to the State Duma.

In January 2010, Smetanyuk was appointed Deputy Plenipotentiary Representative of the President in the Ural Federal District, in connection with which he terminated the powers of a deputy of the State Duma. In November 2012, he was appointed Deputy General Director of OJSC Transneft-Siberia.
