= Mikhail Men =

Russian politician (born 1960)

- Михаил Мень
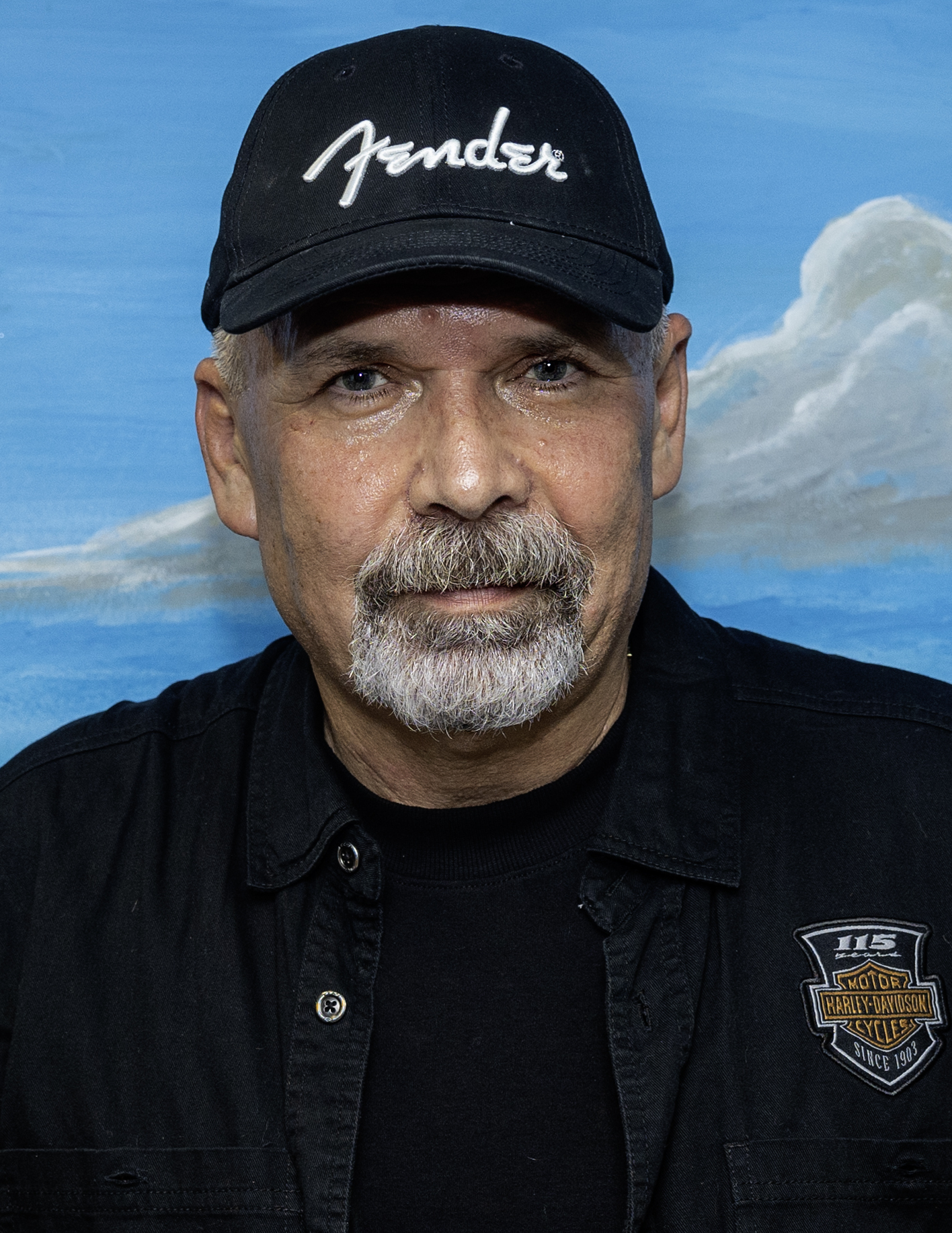
- Men in 2024

Auditor of the Accounts Chamber of Russia
- In office 1 November 2013 – 2 June 2021
- Preceded by: Alexander Filipenko
- Succeeded by: Natalia Trunova

Minister of Construction Industry, Housing and Utilities
- In office 1 November 2013 – 18 May 2018
- President: Vladimir Putin
- Prime Minister: Dmitry Medvedev
- Preceded by: Position established, Vladimir Tokarev (as head of Rosstroy)
- Succeeded by: Vladimir Yakushev

4th Governor of Ivanovo Oblast
- In office 23 December 2005 – 16 October 2013
- President: Vladimir Putin; Dmitry Medvedev
- Preceded by: Vladimir Tikhonov
- Succeeded by: Pavel Konkov

Personal details
- Born: 12 November 1960 (age 65) Semkhoz, Sergiyevo-Posadsky District, Moscow Oblast, Russian SFSR, USSR
- Party: United Russia (2004–2018); Yabloko (1993–2000)
- Parent(s): Alexander Men (father); Natalia Grigorenko (mother)
- Education: 1) 468th training complex of Military Maritime Fleet of the USSR, specialty "Tower crane operator"; 2) Gubkin Russian State University of Oil and Gas, professional retraining under the program "Economics and Management at the Enterprises of the Oil and Gas Complex"; 3) Moscow State Art and Cultural University, specialty Director; 4) Russian Presidential Academy of National Economy and Public Administration, specialty Jurisprudence
- Alma mater: Gubkin Russian State University of Oil and Gas; Moscow State Art and Cultural University; RANEPA
- Website: http://www.menn.ru/

Mikhail Alexandrovich Men (Russian: Михаил Александрович Мень; born 12 November 1960) is a Russian statesman and public figure, entrepreneur, musician, composer, producer. Deputy Chairman of the Culture Committee of the State Duma of the Russian Federation (1995–2000). Deputy Governor of the Moscow Oblast (1999–2002), Deputy Mayor of Moscow (2002–2005), Head of Administration (Governor) of the Ivanovo Oblast (2005–2013), Minister of Construction Industry, Housing and Utilities Sector (1 November 2013 — 18 May 2018), Auditor of the Accounts Chamber of the Russian Federation (20 June 2018 — 2 June 2021), Full State Councilor of the Russian Federation, 1st class, Candidate of Philosophical Sciences.

== Biography ==
He was born into the family of a priest and theologian, Father Alexander Men (1935–1990). His mother was Natalia Fyodorovna Grigorenko (1933–2021).

During his school years, he played the lead role in the film Deniskin's Stories, based on the stories of Viktor Dragunsky.

While at school, he graduated from a music school with a specialization in classical guitar. He performed as a member of VIA "Shkolniye Gody", where he composed his own music and performed as both a singer and bass guitarist.

== Education ==
In 1978, immediately after graduating from high school, he entered the Gubkin Russian State University of Oil and Gas, but he did not finish his studies there. Later, he underwent professional retraining at this university by the program "Economics and Management at oil and gas enterprises".

- 1980—1982 — service in the armed forces (units of Pacific Fleet's Dalvoenmorstroy in the cities of Vladivostok (Primorsky Krai) and Sovetskaya Gavan (Khabarovsk Krai). He was an Honors student of military construction. During Men's military service he specialized "Tower crane operator". After his dismissal, he entered and graduated from the directing department of the Moscow State Art and Cultural University. Later, he also graduated from the Russian Presidential Academy of National Economy and Public Administration with honor Diploma in Jurisprudence.
- In 2001, he Mikhail Men defended his PhD thesis for the degree of Candidate of Philosophical Sciences in theme "Value orientations of personality in the context of the mutual influence of religion and other phenomena of spiritual culture"

== The beginning of labor, social, political and creative activities ==
From 1983 to 1991, he worked in cultural institutions in Moscow and Moscow Oblast. In parallel with this work, Mikhail Men launched a number of musical projects. In 1986 together with the guitarist Alexey Tumanov they created the rock band Most. Mikhail Men co-wrote most of the songs, also he recorded vocals and played bass guitar on the band's first album. Later he created the project "Morskoy Patrul" with the famous musician, participant of VIA "Nadezhda", Yuri Stozharov.

In the early 90's, having assembled the old line-up VIA "Shkolniye Gody", he released old songs of the group as a separate album. Together with the famous songwriter Alexander Yelin, they produce the rock band "Primadonna", which won Grand Prix at the All-Union Music Competition "Miss Rock-88".

In 1990–1993, Mikhail Men was a chairman of the Board of the humanitarian and charitable organization "Alexander Men Foundation". He studied at special courses at the VIPKLESPROM Liedership Training Center on the basics of foreign economic activities, engaged in entrepreneurial activities.

In 1993 Mikhail Men was elected as a deputy of the Moscow Oblast Duma from Sergiyevo-Posadsky District. He worked until 1995 as a member of the Committee on Local Self-Government. He was trained by course "The political and economic system of the USA" at Center for Inter-Parliament Cooperation (Washington, USA).

== State activities ==
=== Deputy of the State Duma ===
In 1995 he was elected as a deputy of State Duma of the second convocation in 104th electoral district (received 18.24% of the votes). Men was a Deputy Chairman of the Culture Committee by Stanislav Govorukhin, member of the deputy group "Yabloko".

=== Vice-Governor of Moscow Oblast ===
In September 1999, he was included in federal list of electoral association"Yabloko" at No.3 in Moscow Oblast in regional part of the list for participation in elections to the 3rd State Duma.

Later, in November 1999, Men was registered as a candidate for the post of vice-governor of Moscow Oblast, paired with a candidate of governor Boris Gromov.

On 19 December 1999, Gromov and Men took second place and advanced to the second round together with Gennady Seleznev and Vladimir Kashin.

On 9 January 2000, in the second round of elections, Boris Gromov and Mikhail Men were elected to the posts of governor and vice-governor of Moscow Oblast, respectively.

In March 2000, Men announced his withdrawal from the "Yabloko" association.

Due to changes in regional legislation, on 1 November 2002, Mikhail Men announced an early resignation of vice-governor of Moscow Oblast.

=== Deputy Mayor of Moscow ===
For three years, from November 2002 to November 2005, Mikhail Men worked as deputy Mayor of Moscow in interregional cooperation and sports. From 2003 to 2005, he headed the Commission on Human Rights by Mayor of the capital and Moscow Clemency Board.

=== Governor of the Ivanovo Oblast ===
On 22 November 2005, deputies of the Legislative Assembly of the Ivanovo Oblast approved the candidacy of Mikhail Men for the post of Head of Administration of the Ivanovo Oblast, submitted by the President of the Russian Federation Vladimir Putin. 32 deputies voted for, none against, two were absent.

Mikhail Men became the third member of Yuri Luzhkov team (after former Vice Mayor Valery Shantsev (Governor of the Nizhny Novgorod Oblast) and Vice Speaker of the State Duma Georgy Boos (Governor of the Kaliningrad oblast), appointed by the Kremlin administration to the governor's post.

Since late 1990's, the heads of regional administration have been called governors by journalists, but at the official level only in 2007 Mikhail Men established a name of governor.

From 1 December 2008, to 25 May 2009 — Member of Presidium of the State Council of the Russian Federation.

On 19 October 2010, Russian President Dmitry Medvedev submitted to the Ivanovo Oblast Duma the candidacy of current region's head, Mikhail Men, to give him governor's powers for a second term. By the decision of the Ivanovo Oblast Duma's deputies Mikhail Men's powers were extended.

On 16 October 2013, Men prematurely, at his own request, resigned from the post of Governor of the Ivanovo Oblast. On 1 November of the same year he was appointed Minister of Construction Industry, Housing and Utility Sector.

=== Results of activities ===
Among the results of Men's activities as governor was the elimination of wage arrears in 2011.

From 2005 to 2012, the average salary in the region tripled; regional airport was reconstructed; a bus station building in Shuya was finished.

At the same time, the governor was criticized for insufficient work with investors, with obvious results of work: for example, investors were attracted to the housing and utilities sector of the region for the construction of 16 new boiler houses.

In 2011, in order to modernize the local poultry producer Ivanovsky Broiler, a loan of 700 million rubleswas allocated from regional fund for small and medium-sized businesses at a subsidized interest rate.

In 2020, the Prodo group, which was controlled by managers of Millhouse Capital investment company, and was the owner of Ivanovsky Broiler, repaid the loan by paing 710 million rubles to the budget of Ivanovo Oblast. The repayment of the loan was confirmed by Governor Voskresensky.

Later the loan paid will become a reason for claims against Mikhail Men.

Among the cultural changes, there is an initiativeto raise money and buy out the Andrey Tarkovsky archive at Sotheby's auction in November 2012 (the archive was bought for 1.3 million pounds and transferred to the Andrey Tarkovsky HouseMuseum in Yuryevets). Promotion of the Ivanovo city of Ples, thanks the construction of tourist infrastructure and international festivals - fashion festival "Linen Palette. Ples on the Volga" and the "Mirror" film festival; creation of state professional recording studio "Ivan-Records" for young musicians in this region.

==== Job ratings as governor ====
In 2004, Vyacheslav Nikonov, president of "Politika" Foundation spoke about Men's appointment:

The introduction by President of Russian Federation about candidacy of the Deputy Mayor of Moscow in the metropolitan government of Mikhail Men for the Governor's post of Ivanovo Oblast is explained solely by business qualities of the Vice Mayor, and not by any political considerations

In 2013, political scientist Alexander Kynev said that because of the Governor, the political system in Ivanovo Oblast has degraded and:

Behind the outwardly decent formal image of a complacent governor with a legendary surname, there was a hard tightening of nuts and reliance on imported Moscow region cadres

== Ministry of Construction, Housing and Utilities of the Russian Federation ==
On 1 November 2013, the Ministry of Construction, Housing and Utilities was established by Decree of the President of the Russian Federation. New department was headed by Mikhail Men.

As the newspaper Kommersant wrote, Mikhail Alexandrovich Men was remembered by the constraction market for numerous reforms in a field of shared-equity construction. He began to work on preparing for the rejection of its use.

In February 2018, Ministry of Construction proposed that developers start using escrow accounts, where co-investors' money should be kept until the end of construction. According to Ministry's plan, developers working with escrow accounts should be exempt from the need to make contributions to the compensation funds of shareholders. During Men's work as a Minister of Construction, Housing and Utilities of Russian Federation, one of the largest Russian developers, Mikhail Balakin's SU-155, was forced to leave the construction market, which in 2015 announced its inability to complete the construction of 71 houses and its obligations to 27 thousand participants in shared-equity construction. The Ministry of Construction has developed a scheme for the rehabilitation of the SU-155, the main obligations of which were assumed by state bank "Russian Capital".

Over the years of management, there has been a dynamic in housing commissioning. 2014—2017 became a record for the Russian housing construction market — the volume of housing commissioning in 2014 amounted to 84.2 million m^{2}, in 2015 — 85.3 million m^{2}, in 2016 — 80.2 million m^{2}, in 2017 — 79.2 million m^{2}. During the period of leadership of the Ministry of Construction by Mikhail Men from 2014 to 2017, about 4 million mortgage borrowers improved their living conditions. Mortgages became available to 33% of families by 2016, with the value of this indicator not exceeding 5% in the early 2000s. In 2017, about 1.1 million loans worth more than 2 trillion rubles were issued, which is almost 27% more in quantitative terms and 37% more in monetary terms than in 2016, mortgage rates decreased to the level of 9.79%.

Under the Minister Mikhail Men, licensing of the management of apartment buildings was introduced, which at the first stage led to weeding out 13% of management companies. Already after the introduction of licensing, 653 licenses were terminated, 21 licenses were canceled. According to the GIS of housing and communal services, as of May 2018, there were 21146 licenses in the country. The Ministry of Construction, under my leadership, managed to raise the rate of resettlement of emergency housing from 1 million "squares" in 2013 to 3 million in 2014 and subsequent.

Since the creation of the Ministry of Construction, Russia has risen in the World Bank's Doing Business rating in the direction of "Obtaining a construction permit" by 63 positions from 178th place to 115th. Another initiative of the Ministry of Construction is the implementation of the priority project "Formation of comfortable urban environment". 25.6 billion rubles were allocated from the federal budget to finance projects to create a comfortable urban environment. In 2017, more than 23 thousand objects were improved as part of the project. In 2018, for the first time in Russian practice, a rating vote was held on improvement projects, which was attended by more than 18 million people.

During the years of Mikhail Men's leadership, the Federal State Information System of Pricing in the construction of the (FGIS CA) was put into operation.

Head of the supervisory board of the Federal Autonomous Institution Glavgosexpertiza.

=== Results of activities ===
According to Andrey Nazarov, co-chairman of Delovaya Rossiya, the Ministry of Construction of the Russian Federation has managed to reduce the number and cost of administrative procedures by more than half in six years, which is an excellent indicator.

Sergei Gordeiko from Rusipoteka noted: "The preservation of the volume of mortgage lending was a great success of the Ministry of Construction during the period of Mikhail Men's leadership. The volume of construction is annually near the mark of 80 million square meters per year, in 2014-2016 the figure was higher. At the end of 2017, the drop in housing commissioning was 2%".

Alexey Perlin, CEO of SMU-6 Investments, reported: "During his tenure as Minister of Construction, Housing and Utilities, the volume of housing commissioning has increased significantly, reaching record levels. The program "Mortgage with state support" helped the construction market in difficult times, while mortgage rates today have dropped to record lows and continue to decline." Ilshat Nigmatullin, President of the Granel Group of Companies, credited Mikhail Men for the introduction of a major overhaul system.

In January 2017, he was elected as a member of General Council, United Russia Party. In December 2017, he was elected as a member of presidium of General Council of United Russia Party. In June 2018, he suspended membership in the United Russia Party in accordance with the law "On Accounts Chamber of Russian Federation".

In March 2018, President of Russian Federation awarded the head of Ministry of Construction Mikhail Men for "Many years of impeccable public service" with the distinction "For Impeccable Service".

== Auditor of Accounts Chamber of Russian Federation ==
On 20 June 2018, on the proposal of the President of the Russian Federation, he was appointed by the Federation Council to the position of auditor of the Accounts Chamber of the Russian Federation. Among the areas of work — control activities in the area of spending federal budget funds in the social sphere and science.

Since 1 October 2019 — Auditor of the Accounts Chamber of the Russian Federation, supervising the direction of control activities in the field of spending federal budget funds. And also in the field of environmental management and agriculture.

On 13 November 2019, Men made a report to the State Duma on state policy in the field of environmental development and ensuring environmentally safe waste management, where he noted that out of 97% of the 70 million tons of MSW generated annually are placed in landfills, "often located within cities and settlements." "Reducing landfill areas and preventing a formation of unauthorized landfills is impossible without creating a comprehensive waste management system," he said.

In 2019, CEO of state-owned company "Russian Environmental Operator" (REO), which oversees a "garbage" reform, Denis Butsaev was prematurely dismissed by order of Prime Minister of Russian Federation Dmitry Medvedev. As the media reported, son of Prosecutor General Igor Chaika was in favor of appointing Butsaev to the post of a head of REO. After Butsaev was removed from office, Mikhail Men was named one of the likely candidates for the position of a head of Russian Environmental Operator.

In November 2019, Deputy Prime Minister of Government of Russian Federation Alexey Gordeev announced that the government of Russian Federation decided to appoint Mikhail Men, ex-head of Ministry of Construction, as CEO of Russian Environmental Operator. However, this appointment did not happen later, and Men continued to work as an auditor of Accounts Chamber in Russian Federation.

Mikhail Men's report, published in October 2020, discussed the problems with the implementation of the garbage reform, which mentioned companies associated with people close to the head of the National Guard of Russia, Viktor Zolotov, and the head of Rostec, Sergei Chemezov.

On 10 November 2020, as a result of publication the report of auditor in Accounts Chamber M.A. Men, the head of Ministry of Natural Resources Dmitry Kobylkin, who was responsible for the implementation of "garbage reform", was dismissed. A few days before Kobylkin's resignation, Ilya Gudkov, the head of public law company "Russian Environmental Operator", was removed from his post.

In the last report of Mikhail Men was said that one of the largest companies - the "Big Three" - was engaged in modernization of unified state information system for accounting for waste from the use of goods (EGIS "UOIT"). The contract in amount of 566 million rubles was signed in August 2019. One of the owners of the "Big Three" was Yuri Chechikhin, whom the media call the son-in-law of the head of Rosgvardiya Viktor Zolotov. The claims of Accounting Chamber to this project were related to the fact that the UOIT Unified State Examination System is identical in its functionality to the UTKO GIS program (municipal waste accounting system), which is also used in the field of waste management. The auditors considered that this is an inefficient expenditure of budget money.

=== Results of activities ===
8 days after the resignation of the head of the Ministry of Natural Resources Dmitry Kobylkin, who was responsible for the implementation of the "garbage reform" and the dismissal of Ilya Gudkov from the post of head of the public law company "Russian Environmental Operator", on 18 November 2020, the Investigative Committee of the Russian Federation appealed to the Federation Council. It satisfied the submission of Prosecutor General Igor Krasnov and agreed to criminal prosecution Mikhail Men is responsible for the allegedly stolen loan, which was paid in full to the budget of the Ivanovo Oblast back in June 2020. Also it was issued from the budget of the Ivanovo Oblast in 2011 to the Ivanovsky Broiler to improve the material base.

In November 2020, M.A. Men was charged the article 160 of Criminal Code of Russian Federation for alleged embezzlement committed as governor of the Ivanovo Oblast. According to Igor Krasnov, "sufficient evidence was obtained of Men guilt" in embezzlement of 700 million rubles from the budget of the Ivanovo Oblast in 2011 for the modernization of one of the agro–industrial complex enterprises - poultry meat producer "Ivanovsky Broiler", when Mikhail Men was governor and head of the government of the Ivanovo Oblast. According to the Prosecutor General, after receiving a loan for the development of production, the funds allocated to "Ivanovsky Broiler" were allegedly stolen.

On 22 June 2020, even before the initiation of proceedings against M. Men, the Prodo Group, which was controlled by the managers of Roman Abramovich's investment company Millhouse Capital, repaid the debt of "Ivanovsky Broiler", returning 710 million rubles to the regional budget.

Despite the fact that the loan was repaid in full, the initiators of the "theft" were called "unidentified persons from among the beneficiaries" of the Prodo group of companies, which then included "Ivanovsky Broiler". The owners of GC "Prodo" Andrey Gorodilov, Efim Malkin and Irina Panchenko are considered associates of Roman Abramovich. Men, according to the investigation, led the theft, earlier another ex-governor of the Ivanovo Oblast, Pavel Konkov, who was the first deputy governor during the loan issuance period, was involved in the case. Mikhail Men denied all charges.

On 18 May 2021, the court dismissed the case against Mikhail Men. The case against the auditor of the Accounting Chamber M.A. Men was terminated due to the expiration of the statute of limitations. At the same time, the court dismissed the cases against the ex-governor of the region Pavel Konkov and the managing director of JSC "Ivanovsky Broiler" Dmitry Grishin. Mikhail Men pleaded not guilty in court.

On 1 June 2021, the Federation Council received a presidential submission on the early release of Mikhail Men from the post of auditor of the Accounting Chamber at his request. On 2 June 2021, the senators agreed with the submission of Russian President Vladimir Putin on the early termination of the powers of auditor of the Accounts Chamber of the Russian Federation Mikhail Men in connection with his personal statement.

After completing his career as a civil servant, Men said that he intended to engage in projects "related to creative and entrepreneurial activities."

=== Evaluation of the activities and grounds for the persecution of Mikhail Men ===
Vladimir Zherebenkov, lawyer of the interregional collegium of lawyers "Law and Man", commented on the situation to the Vedomosti newspaper: "But judging by the fact that the money was returned, there is no corpus delicti as such".

On 17 May 2021, the court stopped the criminal case against the ex-governor due to the expiration of the statute of limitations.

Commenting on the termination of the criminal case to the ZVEZDA TV channel, lawyer Murad Musayev said: "Mikhail Men ... pleaded not guilty and agreed to the termination of the case".

The media connected Men's case with his professional activities during his work in the Accounts Chamber. As Stanislav Belkovsky noted, "the real reason, most likely, is that, already working in the Accounts Chamber, Mikhail Men showed excessive diligence in studying the so-called garbage topic, the topic of waste disposal."

Evgeny Minchenko "does not exclude that what is happening may be related to the sphere of Men's current work in the Accounts Chamber – he dealt with the topics of ecology and garbage reform".

Political observer Dmitry Yuryev commented on the Gazeta.Ru publication:

"In my opinion, "the case of Mikhail Men" is a rare case when from the very beginning everything was absolutely transparent. Given: the auditor of AC works on the garbage (in the sense – on the garbage operator). It is necessary: stop for a few months, during this time we will fix everything. Solution: we put the auditor in prison for several months, then let him go."

The Ivanovo journalist Aleksey Mashkevich, who conducted his journalistic investigation of the "Ivanovsky Broiler" case, believes that the criminal case against Mikhail Men and Pavel Konkov had a political connotation and pursues only one goal – to put an end to their careers, and "chicken money" is not the cause, but only a reason for excitement. Politician Boris Nadezhdin in a commentary to Meduza called the prosecution of Mikhail Men "political":

“There's some kind of fight going on under the carpet. You can find something on any official in any regional administration to launch a case. It's some kind of elite infighting; it's not a war on corruption.”

The head of the political expert group Konstantin Kalachev, in a comment to the Free Press, explained the persecution of Men by an intra-elite struggle: "If a case is raised ten years ago, then the trigger is the events of present time. Obviously, this is connected not so much with the fight against embezzlement as with intra—elite showdowns," Kalachev also pointed out that the persecution of Me is probably related to his professional activities as an auditor of the Accounts Chamber - he was engaged in garbage and ecology.

Doctor of Economics Nikita Krichevsky in his interview linked the persecution of Mikhail Men with the activities of the auditor of the Accounts Chamber. In particular, Krichevsky pointed out: "In 2020, my department announced fraud with oil and gas reserves, having found out that raw materials companies put deposits on the state balance sheet, the resources of which are not subsequently confirmed. In the fall of 2020, Men announced the failure of the garbage reform, that only 7% of waste is still processed in Russia, and over 90% is sent to landfills and landfills."

== Scientific activity ==
In 2025, Mikhail Men became the scientific curator of the Center for the Study of the New Wave of Migration from the Former Soviet Union at the Institute for Euro-Asian Jewish Studies in Israel.

Since 2005, he has been an Honorary Doctor of the Institute of Theology at the Belarusian State University (October 28, 2005) for his significant contribution to the formation of modern principles of Church-State relations and for his contribution to the development of cooperation between Belarus and Russia.

Honorary Professor at the Moscow Architectural Institute.

== Books, scientific works and publications ==
In 2025, Mikhail Men wrote and published a fiction book about his father, the priest Alexander Men, titled "The Shepherd. Light in the Darkness." The book was presented in September 2025 in Sergiev Posad.

=== Scientific works and publications ===
- Men M. A. Culture and religion. — M.: Path; Truth and life, 2001. — 176 p.
- Men M. A. Land. Problems of land use and the investment process in Moscow region. — M.: Path; Truth and Life, 2002.
- Men M. A. Constitution, State, Church: ensuring civil security, peace and harmony. — M.: Gothic, 2005.
- Men M. A., Nazarov A. Yu., Smirnov E. A. Leadership and values. — St. Petersburg: Publishing House of St. Petersburg State University, 2010.
- Men M. A. Leadership as a social and personal phenomenon (theoretical and methodological aspects of research). — Moscow: Publishing House of Moscow State University, 2011.
- Men M. A. Social Philosophy of Leadership (conceptual analysis). — M.: Publishing House of the Independent Institute of Civil Society, 2013.

== Organization of festivals ==
Mikhail Men initiated few Russian festivals: First Russian Guitar Music Festival, Dubrava Music Jazz Festival, Andrei Tarkovsky International Film Festival, Ples Jazz Festival, Rock Panorama (1980s event reopened), Black Rose International Music Festival, and Interregional Rock Festival "Antifabrika".

== Creative work ==
Michael Men Project
- Origin: Russia
- Genres: Hard rock
- Years active: 2004
- Label: Inna Records
- Members: Mikhail Men; Glenn Hughes; Joe Lynn Turner

As a composer and musician Mikhail Men gets international recognition in 2005, when his album Made in Moscow was released, in which musicians Glenn Hughes and Joe Lynn Turner took part. The music for the album was written by Mikhail Men in collaboration with Alexey Tumanov, Igor Ryabtsev and Mikhail Zatravkin, and the lyrics were written by Joe Lynn Turner and Glenn Hughes. Russian musicians Dmitry Chetvergov, Nikolai Devlet-Kildeev, Valery Diorditsa, Alexander Berezhnoy, Piotr Makienko, Alexander Lvov, Pavel Titovets, Alexander Filonemko, Mikhail Lomov and Andrey Lomov participated in the project.

Later Mikhail Men organizes a concert tour of Joe Lynn Turner in Russia, where he performs as a producer and bass guitarist. In 2017, the vinyl album Made in Moscow will be released, consisting of two records. On one – original Made in Moscow in studio sounds, on the second – professional recording Made in Moscow Live, arranged on one of the concerts. Album "Michael Men Project. Made in Moscow" hit the charts in Finland (#54 in Deezer Top 300 Releases) and Germany (#73 in iTunes Top 200).

Mikhail Men also helps to establish organizations in Russia for captive executors. Among the realized projects – tour of the British rock vocalist Graham Bonnet (Alcatrazz and Rainbow), British trio-band Boot Led Zeppelin, Scottish rock band Nazareth and others.

In 2006, Mikhail Men, together with famous performers Grigory Leps, Alexander Marshal, Sergey Mazaev, Igor Sandler, Anatoly Alyoshin and others, took part in the recording of the official tribute album "Пипл про/to purple" which hits #39 in the Deezer All Genres Top 300 Releases chart in Russia.

In 2009, Mikhail Men is producing the group Natsproekt which is applying for participation in the Eurovision Song Contest with the English-language song Last Call by Mikhail Men. But the group does not go through all the stages of pre-selection. The song Last Call is released as a separate single and in the debut album "Ivanovsky Blues" by the Natsproekt group on all digital showcases and on CD.

Later, Mikhail Men produced the rock band Monoraga, which releases the album "Принцип каждодневных схем" on all digital showcases, as well as five singles: "Чертое Платье", "Ты", "Тайна за семью печатями", "Амстердам" and "Край"

Mikhail Men is also producing the Finnish singer Mariam Men and releasing her Popular Jewish Songs album available on all digital storefronts.

In 2016, Mikhail Men initiated the revival of the legendary rock group Kruiz. The collective successfully gave several concerts, including at the Luzhniki Small Sports Arena, for which the famous guitarist and one of the founders of the group Valery Gaina specially flew from the USA. The renewed Kruiz has released two albums "The Rebirth of the Legend. Live" and "Rock Panorama 2016. Live". But after that, due to constant disagreements between the musicians, the group ceased to exist and broke up into several different groups.

In recent years, Mikhail Men became interested in jazz and began to develop in its various trends. There were jams of Mikhail Men with famous Russian jazzmen, among them saxophonists Alexei Kozlov and Sergei Golovnya, guitarist Alexei Kuznetsov, pianist and flutist Vladimir Nesterenko.

In 2017, Mikhail Men, together with guitarist Dmitry Chetvergov, create the ChetMen band. The style of the group can be described as fusion - a fusion of jazz, blues, funk, soul with elements of pop rock, art rock and ethnic music. Albums and singles of the ChetMen group have repeatedly occupied leading positions in the Russian and foreign top charts. Thus, the composition Sarcasm held the 1st place in the Russian iTunes Top 200 Tracks in the jazz category, a record for this genre for three and a half weeks. Dubrava Live was ranked 5th in the iTunes Top 200 Tracks in the jazz category in France. The group is a participant in the festivals Koktebel Jazz Party, Jazz of a quiet backwater, Dubrava Music. In 2019, ChetMen performed at the Septembre Musical in Montreux (Switzerland).

Together with pianist Alexander Mironov, Mikhail Men also creates the jazz trio MM +, which performs classical pieces in a jazz arrangement. MM + performed Sergei Rachmaninoff's Piano Concerto No. 2 in his own jazz interpretation at Igor Butman's Sochi Jazz Festival.

In 2019, Mikhail Men, together with musician Dmitry Chetvergov and entrepreneur Alexander Finkelstein, are building a recording studio for Moscow City Records, as well as organizing a record label and production center of the same name.

In 2020, Mikhail Men records bass guitar parts on several tracks of Dmitry Chetvergov's new album "Повороты судьбы" which hits the iTunes Top 200 charts in Russia (all genres - # 2, rock - # 1), in rock genre: number of weeks in the chart - 1.

Mikhail Men is a member of the Union of Composers of Russia.

In 2023, the media reported on a concert by Men and his music group in Israel with the program "Two Phases of the Moon". In the same year, Men's song "The Sun of Tel Aviv" entered the Russian iTunes Top 200 chart, ranking 185th in the "Pop" category. The song "Little Angel", dedicated to the victims of the terrorist attack on Israel on October 7, 2023, with music composed by Men, was performed by Alexander Lvovsky.

In 2024, Michael Menn's Band performed a tribute program of Amy Winehouse's songs at the opening of the Sea Jazz Ashdod Festival. In 2024, Men released a collection of instrumental material, "The Best," which took second place in the Jazz category and 13th place in the overall iTunes ranking.

In December 2024, Kristina Orbakaite's digital single "Life Is One" was released, with Mikhail Men co-writing the music. In 2025, the track was included on the singer's album "I Dance on the Sun."

== Discography ==
VIA «Школьные годы»
- 2004 — «ВИА Школьные годы» (album)
  - Charts: Russia – iTunes Top 200 (all genres — #196)
«Мост» band
- 1987 — «Мёртвый полигон» (album)
  - Charts: Russia – iTunes Top 200 (all genres — #154)
- 1988 — Best of Live (album)
- 1991 — «Страх смерти» (album)
- 2010 — Made in Dubrava Hall Live (album)
- 2019 — «Элегия» (single)
«Морской патруль» band
- 1989 — «Виндсёрфинг» (single)
- 2008 — «Тропа» (album)
Solo career
- 2002 — «Мой старый друг» (single)
- 2005 — «Песни нашей Победы» (album)
- 2008 — «Время выбрало нас» (album)
  - Charts: Russia – iTunes Top 200 (all genres — #77, pop — #22)
- 2009 — Funky Ball (single)
  - Charts: Russia – iTunes Top 200 (jazz — #1). In jazz: week in chart — 1.
- 2009 — «Поздний звонок» (single)
  - Charts: Russia – iTunes Top 200 (jazz — #3). In jazz: week in chart — 1.
- 2009 — «У реки» (single)
  - Charts: Russia – iTunes Top 200 (rock — #96)
- 2021 — «Мне не уснуть» (single)
  - Charts: Russia – iTunes Top 200 (pop — #57)
Michael Men, Glenn Hughes, & Joe Lynn Turner
- 2005 — Made in Moscow (album)
  - Charts: Germany – iTunes Top 200 (rock #73), Norway – iTunes Top 200 (all genres — #19, rock — #6), Greece – Deezer Top 300 (all genres — #8), Uruguay – Deezer Top 300 (all genres — #197), Switzerland – iTunes Top 200 (rock — #51)
- 2005 — Made in Moscow Live (album)
  - Charts: Finland – Deezer Top 300 (all genres — #54), Indonesia – Deezer Top 300 (all genres — #292), Denmark – Deezer Top 300 (all genres — #272), Russia – Deezer Top 300 (all genres — #272)
- 2017 — Made in Moscow (vinyl album)
ChetMen band
- 2018 — Dubrava Live (album)
  - Charts: Russia – iTunes Top 200 (jazz — #2), France – iTunes Top 200 (jazz — #5)
- 2019 — Наше ТВ (Live) (album)
  - Charts: Russia – iTunes Top 200. Track «Sarcasm» (all genres — #41, jazz — #1). In jazz: week in chart — 3. Whole album (jazz — #162). France – iTunes Top 200 (jazz — #6)
- 2019 — Old Friend (single)
  - Charts: Russia – iTunes Top 200 (jazz — #1)
Другое
- 2019 — Jazz fantasies on the theme of the second concert of Sergei Rachmaninoff (Dmitry Vlasenko, Alexander Mironov, Mikhail Men)
- 2020 — «Московская леди» (joint single with Valery Siutkin)

== Awards ==
- Order of Honour (2011)
- Order of Friendship (1 September 2014)
- Badge of Distinction "For Impeccable Service" of XXV years
- 3 Letters of Gratitude from the President of the Russian Federation
- Medal "In Commemoration of the 850th Anniversary of Moscow" (26 February 1997)
- Stolypin Medal I degree
- Badge "Honorary Builder of Russia"
- Medal of the Ministry of Transport of Russian Federation "For the construction of transport facilities" (30 June 2016)
- Medal of the Ministry of Agriculture of Russian Federation "For contribution to the development of agro-industrial complex of Russia" (9 November 2010).
- Honorary title "Honored Builder of the Khabarovsk Krai"
- Honorary title "Honored Culture Worker of Moscow Oblast"
- Medal "10 Years of the Federal Bailiff Service" (FSSP, 15 October 2007)
- The badge of Distinction "For impeccable service to the City of Moscow" XX years (Moscow, 1 December 2005) — for many years of fruitful activity for the benefit of the city of Moscow and its residents
- Medal "For Impeccable Service" (Moscow region), 4 November 2002)
- Order of St. Sergius of Radonezh II degree (2007) — for attention to the works on the erection of a monument to the clergy and laity who suffered for the faith of Christ during the seizure of church valuables in 1922, in Shuya, Ivanovo-Voznesenskaya Diocese
- Order of St. Sergius of Radonezh III degree — for assistance in resolving the issue of former sacristy collection of Trinity-Sergius Lavra.
- Order of the Holy Prince Daniel of Moscow, III degree
- Honorary Doctor of the Institute of Theology of Belarusian State University (28 October 2005) — for his great contribution to the formation of modern principles of relationship between Church and state and for his contribution to the development of cooperation between Belarus and Russia
- Honorary Professor of the Moscow Architectural Institute
- The title of "Honorary Citizen of Ples-city"

== Personal life ==
Married for the second time, three daughters and three sons. His wife, Elena Olegovna Nalimova (born 1975) is a lawyer and entrepreneur. She worked in the apparatus of the Moscow City Duma, the State Duma and the Federation Council, then in commercial structures, was engaged in charity work. Nalimova, with an income of 88.9 million rubles received in 2010, was one of the ten richest wives of governors.

The first wife, Inna Georgievna Men (born 1962, née Petrova) – singer and entrepreneur, performed under the pseudonym Daria Menshikova. Winner of the Grand Prix at "Miss Rock-88" All-Union Music Competition, laureate of the festival "Rhythms of Jurmala-86".

He is fond of music and sports (alpine skiing, table tennis, cycling).

He lives in the Arkhangelskoye dacha farm, next to the Arkhangelskoye estate.
