= Valery Falkov =

Russian jurist and politician

- Валерий Фальков
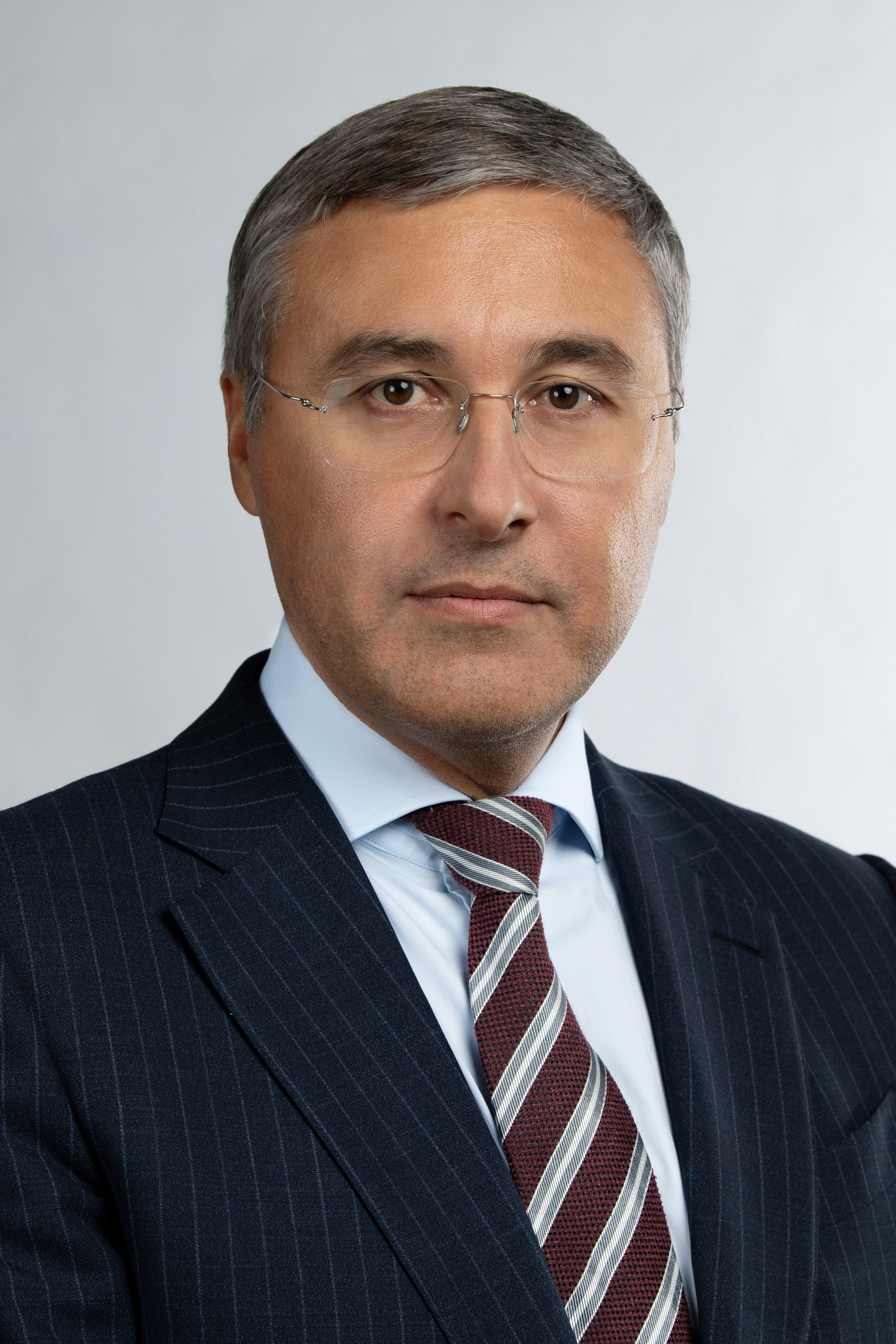
- Falkov in 2020

Minister of Science and Higher Education
- Incumbent
- Assumed office 21 January 2020
- Prime Minister: Mikhail Mishustin
- Preceded by: Mikhail Kotyukov

Rector of the University of Tyumen
- In office 21 March 2013 – 21 January 2020
- Preceded by: Gennady Chebotaryov
- Succeeded by: Yelena Tumakova (acting)

Personal details
- Born: 18 October 1978 (age 48) Tyumen, Soviet Union
- Party: United Russia
- Education: Tyumen State University; Institute of State and Law
- Profession: Jurist

Valery Nikolayevich Falkov (Russian: Валерий Николаевич Фальков; born 18 October 1978) is a Russian jurist, academic and politician who is serving from 21 January 2020 as the Minister of Science and Higher Education of Russia. Prior to that he was the rector of Tyumen State University.

== Biography ==
He graduated from Novoseleznevskaya secondary school in the Kazansky District of the Tyumen Oblast. In 1995, he entered the law faculty of Tyumen State University, in 2000 he graduated from the Institute of State and Law with a degree in jurisprudence, after which he entered graduate school and in May 2003 completed it ahead of schedule with the defense of his dissertation "Improving the Legal Regulation of Election Campaigning in the Russian Federation".

From 2003 to 2007 he served as Deputy Head of the Department of Constitutional and Municipal Law in Tyumen State University and in 2007 was awarded the academic title of associate professor in the department.

From March to November 2007 – Deputy Director for Academic Affairs at the Institute of State and Law, Tyumen State University. From 2007 to 2011 – Vice-Rector for Continuing Education and Branches of Tyumen State University, from 2011 to March 2012 – Director of the Institute of Law, Economics and Management of Tyumen State University.

From October 2012 to April 2013 – Acting Rector of the Tyumen State University. On 21 March 2013 he was elected rector of that university at a conference of the labor collective. On 30 April 2015 he was elected chairman of the Council of Rectors of the universities of the Tyumen Oblast.

From 2006 to 2013, he was a member of the Election Commission of the Tyumen Oblast with a casting vote. From 2009 to 2011, he was elected Chairman of the Council of Young Scientists and Specialists of the Tyumen Oblast.

Since March 2012, he has been deputy chairman of the regional branch of the all-Russian public organization “Association of Lawyers of Russia”, chairman of the Tyumen city branch of the Association.

From 2013 to 2016, he was a deputy of the Tyumen City Duma of the VI convocation, member of the regional political council of the United Russia party, chairman of the standing commission on urban planning and land relations of the Tyumen City Duma.

From 18 September 2016 to 21 January 2020 – deputy of the Tyumen Oblast Duma in the single-mandate constituency No. 17.

On 17 April 2018, he was appointed rector of the Tyumen State University by decision of the Certification Commission of the Russian Ministry of Education and Science. On 15 January 2020 was included in the working group to prepare proposals for amendments to the Constitution of the Russian Federation.

On 21 January 2020 per presidential decree signed by president Putin, he was appointed to the Minister of Science and Higher Education of Russia.

== Sanctions ==
In December 2022 the EU sanctioned Valery Falkov in relation to the 2022 Russian invasion of Ukraine.
