= Governor of Tyumen Oblast =

Highest-ranking official in Tyumen Oblast, Russia

- Coat of arms of Tyumen Oblast

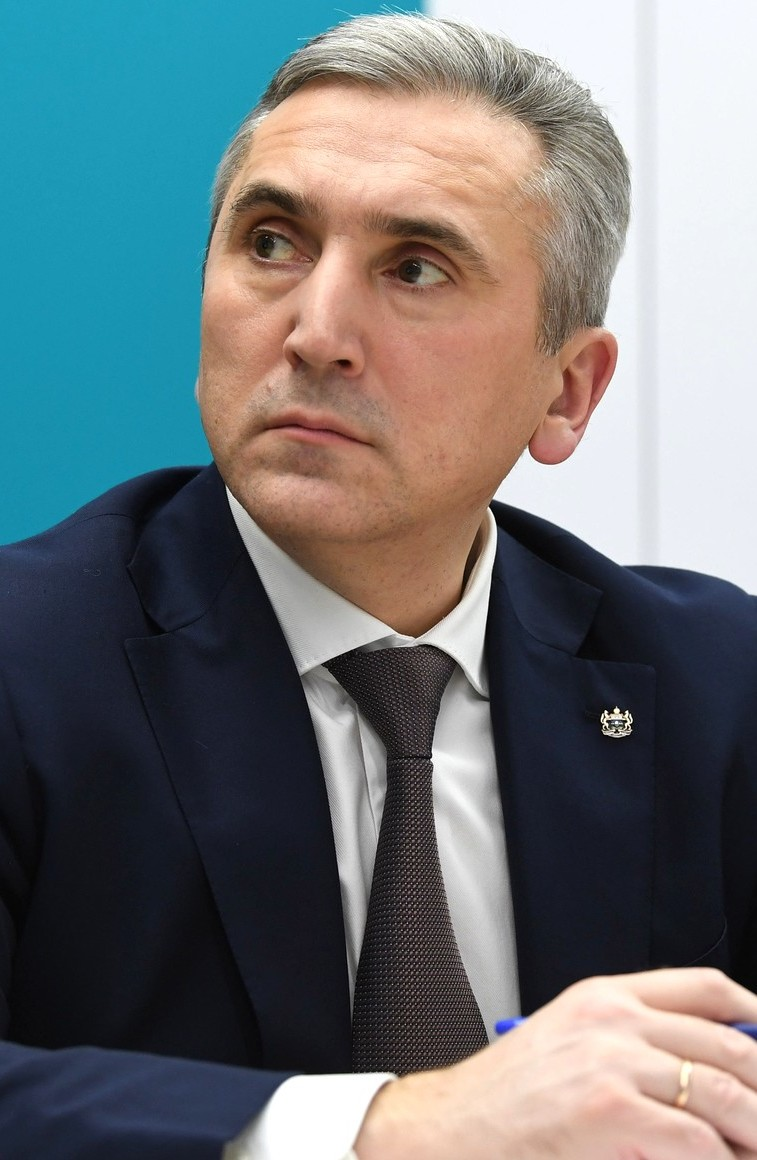
- Incumbent; Aleksandr Moor since 14 September 2018
- Seat: Tyumen
- Term length: 5 years
- Inaugural holder: Yuri Shafranik
- Formation: 1991
- Website: gubernator.admtyumen.ru

The governor of Tyumen Oblast (Russian: Губернатор Тюменской области) is the highest official of Tyumen Oblast, a federal subject of Russia.

== History of office ==
From 1991 to 1993 the head of the regional administration was appointed by the decree of the President of Russia. After the Charter of Tyumen Oblast was adopted (1995), the office of governor was introduced, elected by popular vote of the entire Tyumen Oblast population, including KhMAO and YaNAO. The first election was held in 1996. From 2005 to 2012, the governor was not elected, but appointed by the Tyumen Oblast Duma on the proposal of the federal president.

== List of officeholders ==
#	Portrait	Governor	Tenure	Time in office	Party	Election
1		Yuri Shafranik (born 1952)	27 September 1991 – 12 January 1993 (resigned)	1 year, 107 days	Independent	Appointed
—		Leonid Roketsky (born 1942)	12 January 1993 – 12 February 1993	8 years, 14 days	Independent	Acting
2		Leonid Roketsky (born 1942)	12 February 1993 – 26 January 2001 (lost re-election)	8 years, 14 days	Independent	Appointed 1996–97
3		Sergey Sobyanin (born 1958)	26 January 2001 – 14 November 2005 (resigned)	4 years, 292 days	United Russia	2001; Jan 2005
—		Sergey Smetanyuk (born 1962)	14 November 2005 – 22 November 2005	8 days	United Russia	Acting
4		Vladimir Yakushev (born 1968)	22 November 2005 – 13 May 2014 (resigned)	12 years, 177 days	United Russia	Nov 2005; 2010
—		Vladimir Yakushev (born 1968)	13 May 2014 – 25 September 2014	12 years, 177 days	United Russia	Acting
(4)		Vladimir Yakushev (born 1968)	25 September 2014 – 18 May 2018 (resigned)	12 years, 177 days	United Russia	2014
—		Sergey Sarychev (born 1959)	18 May 2018 – 29 May 2018	11 days	United Russia	Acting
—		Aleksandr Moor (born 1974)	29 May 2018 – 14 September 2018	8 years, 101 days	United Russia	Acting
5		Aleksandr Moor (born 1974)	14 September 2018 – present	8 years, 101 days	United Russia	2018; 2023
