= Stepan Kirichuk =

Russian politician

- Степан Киричук
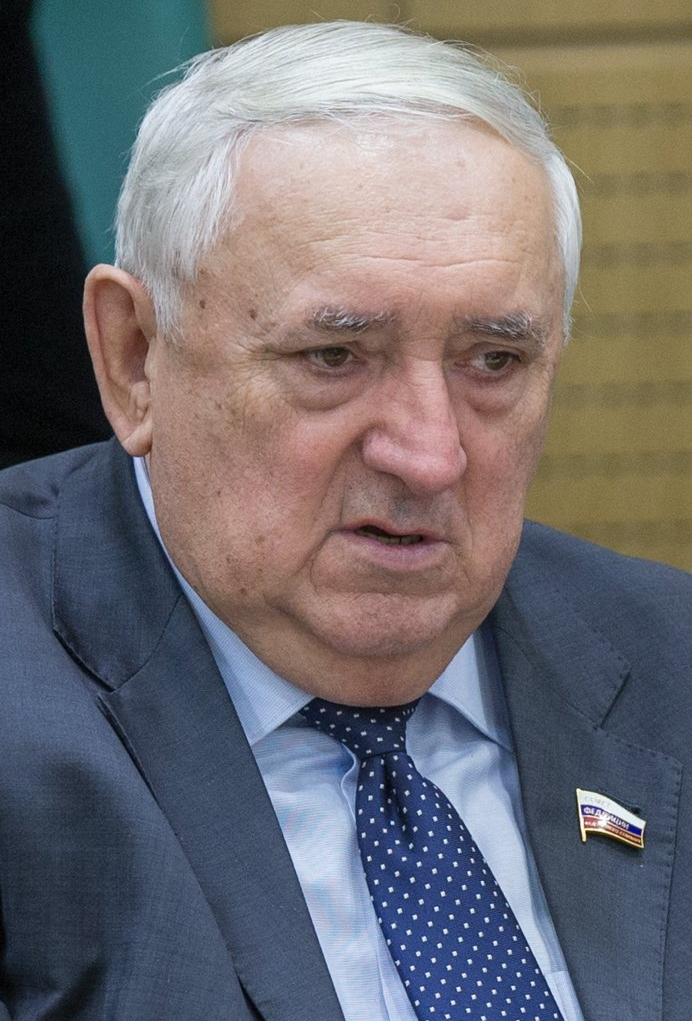
- Kirichuk in 2016

Member of the Tyumen City Duma
- Incumbent
- Assumed office 9 September 2018

Russian Federation Senator from Tyumen Oblast
- In office 23 March 2005 – 17 September 2018
- Preceded by: Aleksandr Gavrin
- Succeeded by: Pavel Tarakanov

Head of Administration of Tyumen
- In office January 1993 – 12 April 2005
- Succeeded by: Vladimir Yakushev

Personal details
- Born: Stepan Mikhailovich Kirichuk; 18 May 1949 (age 77) Mazary, Belarus, Soviet Union
- Party: United Russia
- Spouse: Galina Nikolayevna Kirichuk

Stepan Mikhailovich Kirichuk (Belarusian: Сцяпан Міхайлавіч Кірычук; Russian: Степан Михайлович Киричук; born 18 May 1949) is a Belarusian–Russian politician and former railway worker who has been a member of the Tyumen City Duma since 9 September 2018. He has held various other executive, legislative, and administrative posts in the Tyumen Oblast region since the early 1990s. Kirichuk is a member of the United Russia party.

== Biography ==
Stepan Kirichuk was born on 18 May 1949 to his father, Mikhail Yakovlyevich, and his mother, Maria Stepanovna.

In 1968, after graduating from the Brest College of Railway Transport, he began working as a repairman at track machine station number 170 in Tyumen. From 1968 to 1970, he served in the Soviet Army. Upon returning, he continued working on Tyumen's railroads, first as a track worker, then a foreman, and then a chief engineer. In 1977, he was promoted to head of the Tyumen track length. In 1985, he graduated from the Ural Electromechanical Institute of Railway Engineers. That the same year, he was appointed deputy head of the Sverdlovsk Railway's Tyumen branch.

He entered politics in 1990, when he became Chairman of the Kalinin District Council of People's Deputies. In 1991, he switched to the position of Chairman for the equivalent council in Tyumen City, and he held that seat until 1993. In January 1993, Kirichuk became the Head of Administration of Tyumen, holding that post until April 2005. Also in 2005, he defended his dissertation and became a Doctor of Social Sciences.

He has been elected to the governing bodies of the Union of Russian Cities, the Association of Siberian and Far Eastern Cities, and the Association of the Cities of the Urals. He was the president of the Association of Municipalities of Tyumen Oblast, and is an active member of the Municipal Academy of Russia. Kirichuk was also a member of the scientific and editorial board of the Great Tyumen Encyclopedia in 2004.

On 23 March 2005, Kirichuk was sworn in as a Senator in the Federation Council, and he represented Tyumen Oblast in that Council until 2018. From 25 November 2011 to 14 September 2014, he served as the first Chairman of the Federation Council Committee on Federal Structure, Regional Policy, Local Self-Government and Northern Affairs.

In July 2006, he was elected President of the All-Russian Congress of Municipalities.

In September 2018, Kirichuk was elected to the Tyumen City Duma in single-mandate constituency number 10, having run as a self-nominated candidate. In the municipal parliament, he is the Chairman of the Standing Committee of the City Duma on City Public Administration.

== Personal life ==
Kirichuk is married to Galina Nikolayevna Kirichuk and has two sons.
