= Irek Faizullin =

Russian politician (born 1962)

- Ирек Файзуллин
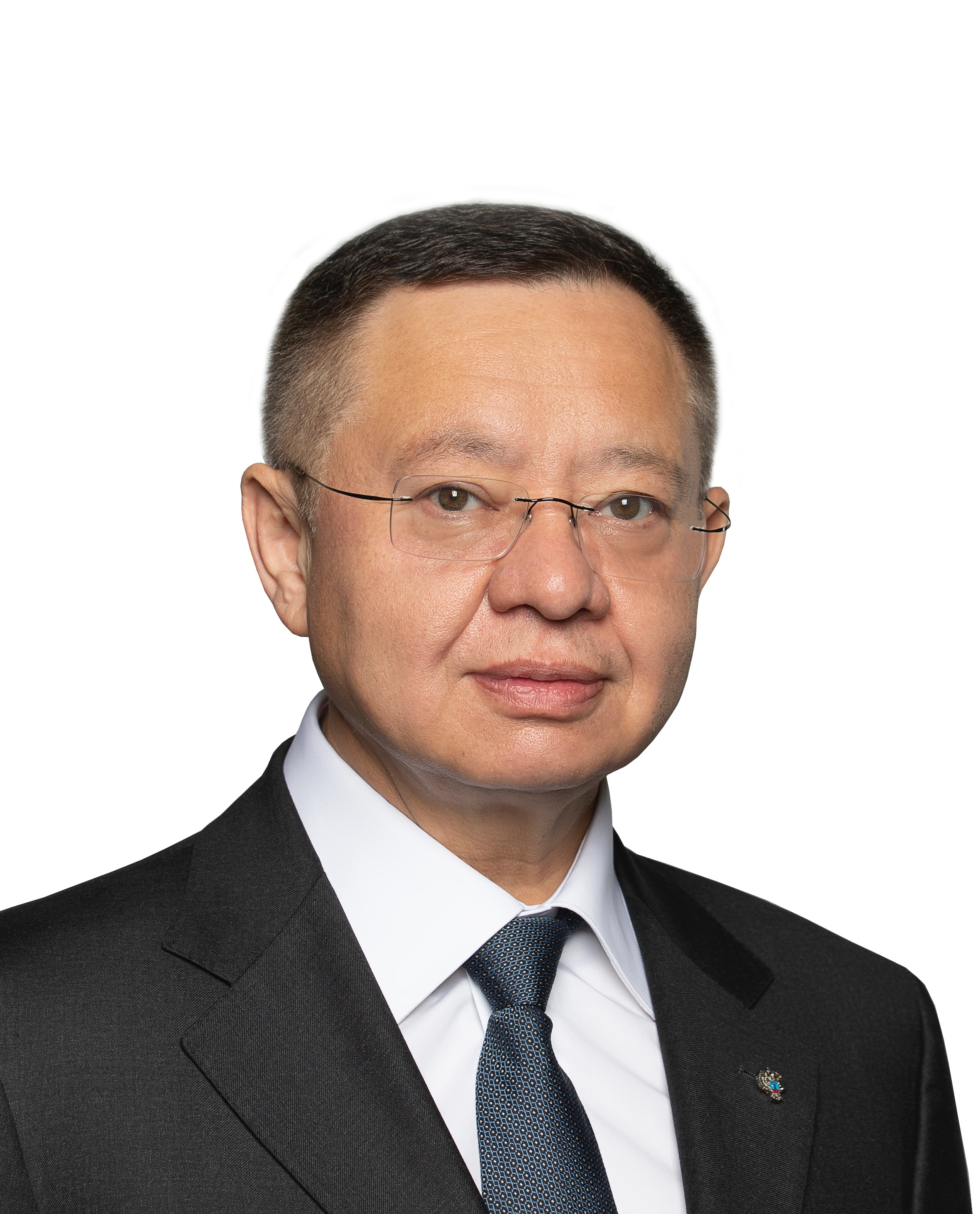
- Official portrait, 2020

Minister for Construction and Housing
- Incumbent
- Assumed office 10 November 2020
- Prime Minister: Mikhail Mishustin
- Preceded by: Vladimir Yakushev

Personal details
- Born: 8 December 1962 (age 63) Kazan, Tatar ASSR, Russian SFSR, Soviet Union
- Party: Independent

Irek Envarovich Faizullin (Note: Russian: И́рек Энва́рович Файзу́ллин Tatar: Ирек Әнвәр улы Фәйзуллин, romanized: İrek Ənvər ulı Fəyzullin) (born 8 December 1962) is a Russian politician who is currently the Minister for Construction and Housing since 10 November 2020. He was deputy minister for construction and housing from 22 January 2020 until 9 November 2020, when Prime Minister of Russia Mikhail Mishustin nominated Faizullin for the post of Minister of Construction & Housing. He was approved by the State Duma and confirmed the post on 10 November. During his nomination, he advocated for a program that focused on achieving a set of goals before the 2024 Russian presidential election, including building more houses to have at least 33 square meters of housing per person and housing renovation

== Early life ==
Faizullin was born on 8 December 1962 in Kazan, which was then part of the Tatar ASSR in the Russian SFSR. In 1985 he graduated from the Kazan Institute of Civil Engineering with a degree in industrial and civil construction. While studying, in 1983 he started working as a concrete carpenter in Chistopol at "Rayselkhoztechnika", and then after graduating until 1989 he worked as an engineer then senior engineer at the Department of Metal Structures and Testing of Structures at his alma mater.

From 1989 to 1993 he then worked as chief engineer then director of the design and construction company "Tatstroyproekt", and was for two years after that chairman of the board of directors of the company "Tatstroyproekt".

== Sanctions ==
In May 2022 the United States Department of the Treasury placed sanctions on Faizullin pursuant to Executive Order 14024 as a member of the Government of Russia. He is also a member of the board of directors of Russian Railways. In February 2022 he was also sanctioned by the European Union, who cited Russian Railways support in transporting Russian Armed Forces across the Ukrainian border which they started undermined the sovergenity of Ukraine.

He was sanctioned by the UK government in 2022 in relation to Russo-Ukrainian War.
