= Georgy Chistyakov =

Father George Chistyakov (Russian: Отец Гео́ргий Чистяко́в; 1953–2007) was a Russian Orthodox priest and historian.

George Chistyakov is considered as a disciple and follower of Alexander Men and served as a priest in the Church of Saints Cosmas and Damian in Shubino (Moscow).

Father George was also a spiritual leader of named after Alexander Men Charity Group and father dean of the Church of Intercession of the Holy Virgin Mary at the Russian Children's Hospital.

He wrote several books, translations, many periodical articles concerning Christianity, delivered lectures in Russia and abroad.

== Saying of Father Chistyakov ==
"When I see an ill child, it somehow turns out that all problems of the whole world, of the whole mankind are concentrated in this little boy or girl".
