= Vladimir Yakushev =

Russian politician (born 1968)

- Владимир Якушев
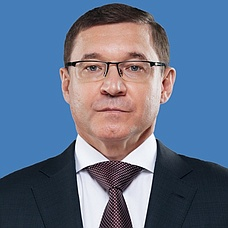
- Official portrait, 2024

Secretary of the General Council of United Russia
- Incumbent
- Assumed office 14 December 2024
- Chairman: Dmitry Medvedev
- Preceded by: Andrey Turchak

Senator from Tyumen Oblast
- Incumbent
- Assumed office 25 September 2024
- Preceded by: Pavel Tarakanov

Presidential Envoy to the Ural Federal District
- In office 9 November 2020 – 24 September 2024
- President: Vladimir Putin
- Preceded by: Nikolay Tsukanov
- Succeeded by: Artem Zhoga

Minister of Construction, Housing and Utilities Russia
- In office 18 May 2018 – 9 November 2020
- President: Vladimir Putin
- Prime Minister: Dmitry Medvedev; Mikhail Mishustin
- Preceded by: Mikhail Men
- Succeeded by: Irek Faizullin

4th Governor of Tyumen Oblast
- In office 24 November 2005 – 18 May 2018
- Preceded by: Sergey Sobyanin
- Succeeded by: Sergey Sarychev (acting); Aleksandr Moor

Head of Tyumen
- In office 12 April 2005 – 24 November 2005
- Preceded by: Stepan Kirichuk
- Succeeded by: Sergey Smetanyuk

Personal details
- Born: 14 June 1968 (age 58) Neftekamsk, Bashkir ASSR, Russian SFSR, Soviet Union (now Republic of Bashkortostan, Russia)
- Party: United Russia
- Spouse: Larisa Yakusheva
- Children: Pavel; Natalya
- Education: University of Tyumen

Vladimir Vladimirovich Yakushev (Russian: Владимир Владимирович Якушев; born 14 June 1968) is a Russian politician. He has been Secretary of the General Council of United Russia from 14 December 2024 and a Senator from Tyumen Oblast and First Deputy Speaker of the Federation Council since September 2024.

Previously, he was the Presidential Plenipotentiary Envoy to the Ural Federal District from 2020 to 2024, Minister of Construction, Housing and Utilities from 2018 to 2020, and Governor of Tyumen Oblast from 2005 to 2018.

He has the federal state civilian service rank of 1st class Active State Councillor of the Russian Federation.

== Early life and career ==
Vladimir Yakushev was born in Neftekamsk on 14 June 1968. At age 7, he moved with his family to his father in Nadym, where he graduated from school.

From 1986 to 1988, he served in the Army.

In 1993, he graduated from University of Tyumen with a degree in law.

== Banking career ==
On 27 June 1993, Yakushev started his career as a legal adviser of the Yamal-Nenets branch of the West Siberian Commercial Bank (Zapsibcombank).

On 25 July 1994, he became acting Director of the Yamal-Nenets branch of the Zapsibcombank, and on 24 January 1995, he became Director of the Yamal-Nenets branch of the Zapsibcombank.

In 1997, he became Vice-President and Director of Salekhard branch of Zapsibcombank. He graduated from University of Tyumen with a degree in economy.

On 29 April 1998, he became President of Zapsibcombank.

== Political career ==
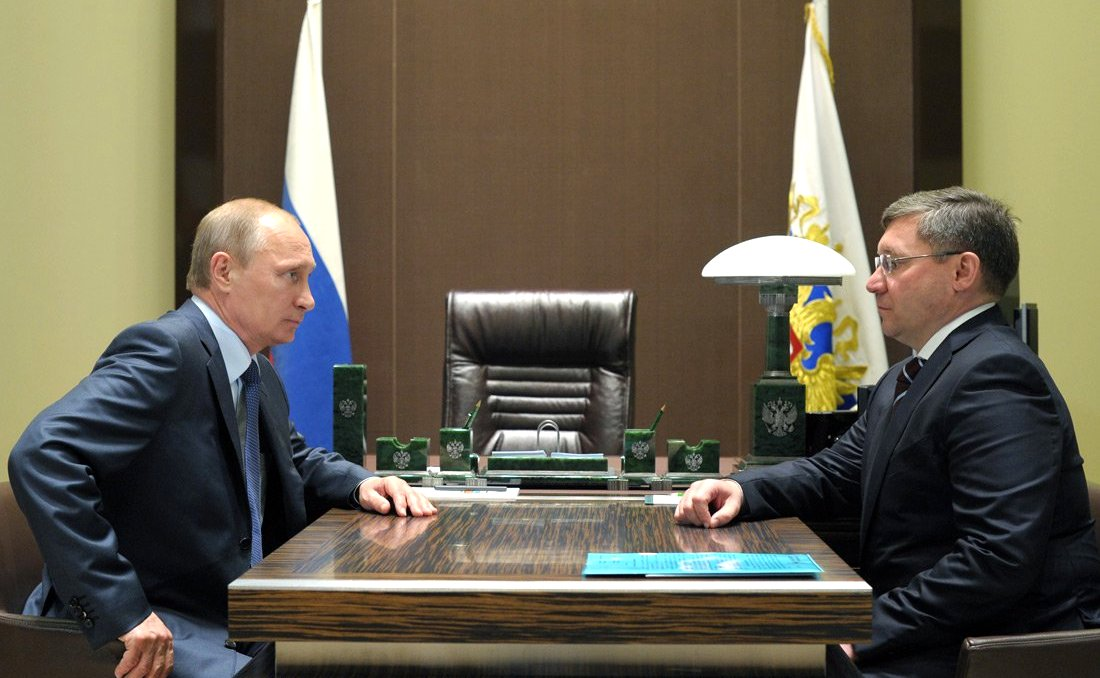
Vladimir Yakushev with President Vladimir Putin, 13 May 2014

On 13 June 2001, Yakushev became vice governor of Tyumen Oblast.

In March 2005, he became the first deputy mayor of Tyumen, and from March 21 he served as acting mayor of Tyumen.

On 24 November 2005, Yakushev became governor of Tyumen Oblast.

On 2 October 2010, he was re-appointed as governor.

On 14 September 2014, he was re-elected governor for a third term, gaining 87.3% of the votes in the first round.

On 18 May 2018, he was appointed Minister of Construction, Housing and Utilities in Medvedev's second cabinet. On 21 January 2020, he was re-appointed to this office in Mishustin's cabinet.

On 1 May, Yakushev was hospitalized after being diagnosed with COVID-19. This happened the day after Prime Minister Mikhail Mishustin was also diagnosed with the coronavirus. On 26 May, Yakushev recovered and returned to the exercise of his powers.

=== Sanctions ===
In response to the 2022 Russian invasion of Ukraine, on 6 April 2022 the Office of Foreign Assets Control of the United States Department of the Treasury added Yakushev to its list of persons sanctioned pursuant to Executive Order 14024.

He was sanctioned by the UK government on 24 March 2022 in relation to the Russo-Ukrainian War.

== Family ==
Yakushev's wife is Larisa Yakusheva, born on 1 January 1963. They married while he was studying at university. Yakushev has two children: a son, Pavel, and a daughter, Natalia.

== Awards ==
- Order of Honour (2008)
- Medal of Nikolay Ozerov (2013)
- Medal of Honor "For Merits in Protection of Children of Russia" (2014)

Party political offices
Preceded by Andrey Turchak	Secretary of the United Russia General Council; 14 December 2024 – present	Succeeded by incumbent
Political offices
Preceded by Mikhail Men	Minister of Construction, Housing and Utilities; 2018–2020	Succeeded by Irek Faizullin
Preceded by Sergey Sobyanin	Governor of Tyumen Oblast; 2005–2018	Succeeded by Sergey Sarychev (acting); Aleksandr Moor
