= Tyumen State University =

University in Tyumen Oblast, Russia

- Тюменский государственный университет
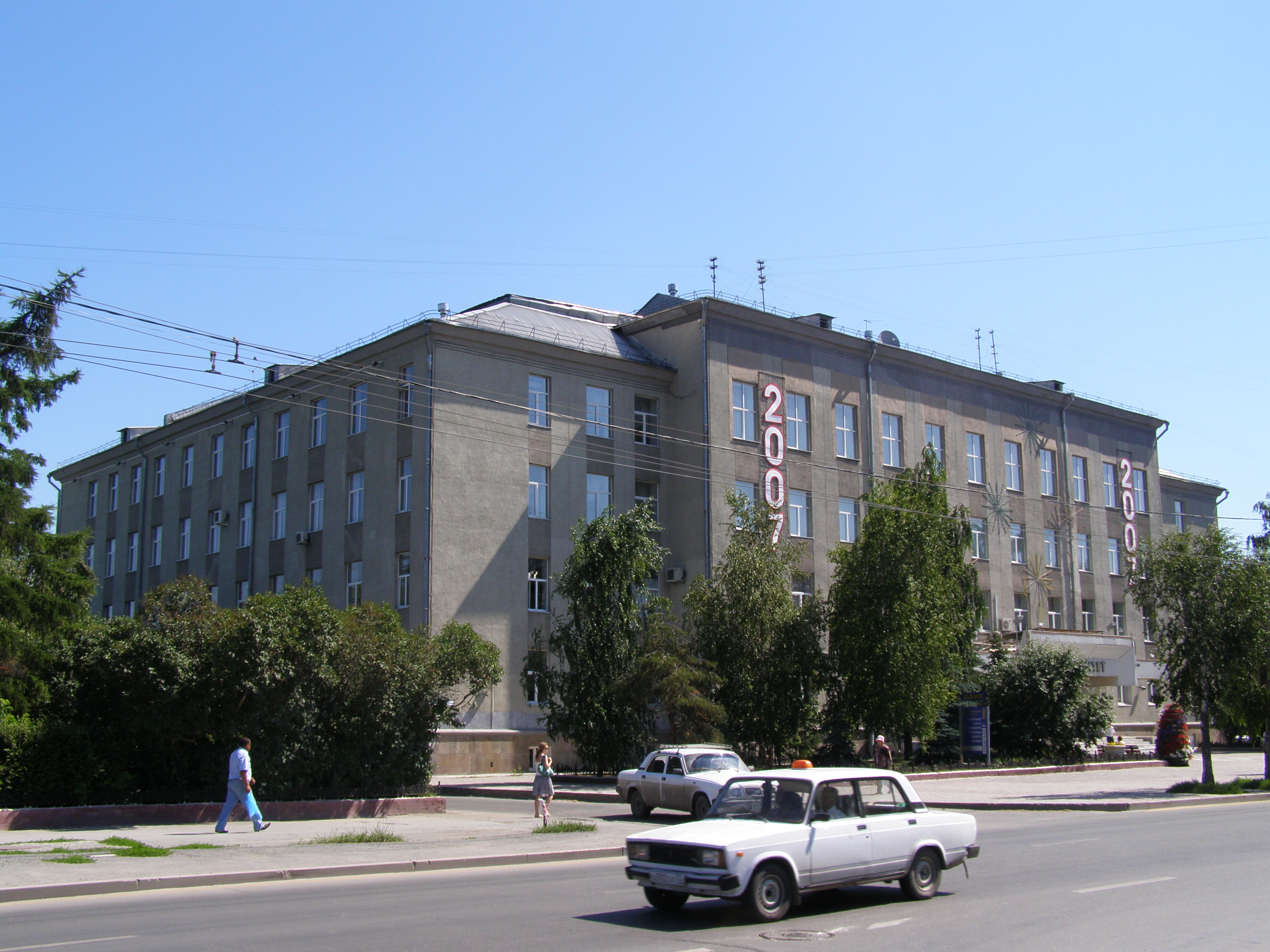
- Former name: Tyumen Pedagogical Institute
- Established: 1930
- Rector: Ivan Romanchuk
- Academic staff: 1,200
- Students: 27,000
- Postgraduates: 342
- Location: 6 Volodarskovo Street, Tyumen, Tyumen Oblast, Russia; 56°28′10″N 84°56′51″E
- Campus: Urban
- Website: https://www.utmn.ru/en/
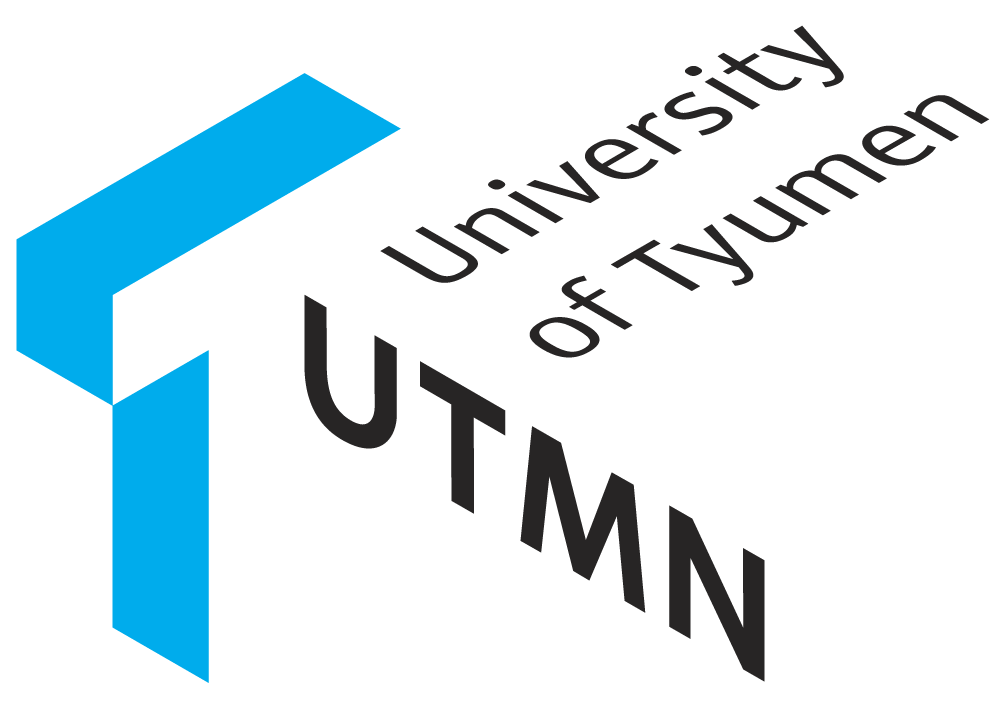

University rankings

Regional – Overall
- QS Emerging Europe and Central Asia: 198 (2022)

Tyumen State University, is a public research university in Tyumen, Russia. It was the first university in Tyumen Oblast and was founded in 1930. Nowadays the UTMN consists of 15 institutes. The total number of students at the university is more than 27,000, including more than 1,900 international students. The total number of faculty and staff is more than 2,000. Today the UTMN trains specialists in 175 fields. The UTMN offers various forms of study: full-time, part-time, distance education, master's degree, undergraduate education, graduate, doctorate, advanced training, and second degree.

The University is one of the participants of the Project 5-100 – the program of improving international competitiveness of the Russian institutions of higher education among the world's leading research and education centers.

The University in 2022 was ranked #801-1,000 in the world in the QS World University Rankings, #1,201 in THE World University Rankings by Times Higher Education, #2,383 by Webometrics, and #2,496 by URAP World Ranking - University Ranking by Academic Performance.

Since 2013 Valeriy Falkov has been the rector of the UTMN. In January, 2020 Falkov was appointed as the Minister of Science and Higher Education of Russia.

== History ==
The development of universal primary education created a desperate need for professional teaching staff, for which reason in 1930 the first Tyumen higher educational institution was founded.

The second half of 1930s saw the start of academic research. In 1935, an experimental plot was created. Scientific expeditions to the north of the Altai, studies of indigenous northern language and folklore and regional teaching courses for locals took place from 1936-40.

Everything changed with the start of World War II in July 1941. During its first year, more than a hundred of students, professors and other staff members went to the front. Nevertheless, the Institute continued working. In February 1942, it hosted an academic conference where 20 papers in the fields of mathematics, chemistry, geography, psychology, literature, Russian language and anti-fascism were presented.

In the 1960s, the fast development of West Siberian oil and gas industry influenced the Institute, which focused on finding the most effective ways of oil and gas extraction. On January 1, 1973, by the decision of the USSR Council of Ministers, the Pedagogical Institute became a State University. The first rector of the University was a doctor of Physics and Mathematics, Igor Aleksandrov.

== Rankings ==
The University in 2022 was ranked #801-1,000 in the world in the QS World University Rankings, #1,201 in THE World University Rankings by Times Higher Education, #2,383 by Webometrics, and #2,496 by URAP World Ranking - University Ranking by Academic Performance.

== Structure ==
The University of Tyumen has 15 academic institutes:

- Institute of Finance and Economics
- Institute of State and Law
- Institute of Mathematics and Computer Sciences
- Institute of Chemistry
- Institute of Physics and Technology
- Institute of Earth Sciences
- Institute of Biology
- Institute of Philology and Journalism
- Institute of History and Political Sciences
- Institute of Psychology and Pedagogy
- Institute of Physical Education
- Institute of Distance Education
- Institute of Environmental and Agricultural Biology (X-BIO)
- Regional Institute of International Cooperation
- School of Advanced Studies (SAS)

== Overview ==
The UTMN campus includes classrooms, research centers, and laboratories. The Acting Rector of the UTMN (since April 2020) is Ivan Romanchuk.

Within the Tempus Project, the International Center of Inclusive Education has been established. Equipment for persons with special needs was purchased with grant funds. The engineer of the International Competence Center of Inclusive Education developed the electronic textbook for blind people – SEEALL. The device enables obtaining writing skills and reading Braille, as well as sending text and audio messages from one module to another.

The development of international activity of the UTMN is based on cooperation with international partners in research, education, and cultural spheres. In 2016, the University had 84 cooperation agreements with international higher education institutions and organizations, seven of which were the world's leading universities featured in the Top 200 according to the international THE, QS and ARWU rankings.

The University holds 4 international summer schools:

- STEP in Russian Energy: Society, Technology, Environment, Policy – educational program for international students.
- Western Siberia: Life, History and Culture.
- Energy Policy in Eurasia is organized by the University of Tyumen in partnership with the European University at St. Petersburg.
- Explore your own Siberia.

== International collaboration ==
The university is a member of the University of the Arctic. UArctic is an international cooperative network based in the Circumpolar Arctic region, consisting of more than 200 universities, colleges, and other organizations with an interest in promoting education and research in the Arctic region. The collaboration has been paused after the beginning of the Russo-Ukrainian War in 2022.

== Global Education ==
The University of Tyumen is one of the employers of the Russian government's Global Education Program, aimed at preparing Russian experts at an international level in the priority directions of development of the Russian economy.

=== Conceptual Engineering of the Oil and Gas Deposits Master’s Program ===
Currently, the UTMN Polytechnic School is the country's only educational platform preparing experts in conceptual engineering for the oil and gas sector. Partner of the Program is Gazprom Neft company.

=== Basic Department of Measurement of Oil and Gas Flow ===
The basic department is used for educational and research purposes.

== Notable alumni ==
- Dmitry Artyukhov - politician, governor of the Yamal-Nenets Autonomous District.
- Vladimir Bogomyakov – poet.
- Yefim Feldman – Soviet Moldavian geographer.
- Sergey Savin – volleyball player, member of Russia men's national volleyball team and Russian club Lokomotiv Novosibirsk.
- Olga Izhenyakova – writer, journalist.
- Nina Kondratkovskaya – poet, journalist and educator.
- Galina Kukleva – biathlete, Olympic champion and three times world champion.
- Konstantin Lagunov – historian and writer.
- Aleksandr Moor - politician, governor of Tyumen Province.
- Konstantin Odegov – actor, film director, producer and journalist.
- Nikolai Pavlov –politician.
- Dmitry Pashkin – literature specialist and musician.
- Aleksandr Petrushin – Tyumen historian and ethnographer.
- Valery Falkov - politician, Minister of Science and Higher Education of Russia
- Vladimir Cheboksarov – former wrestler.
- Sergey Vasilyev – politician and journalist.
- Vladimir Yakushev – politician, Minister of Construction and Infrastructure of Russia.
- Sam Strizhak – lead game designer of Tanki Online.
