= Moscow State Institute of Culture =

University in Moscow, Russia

- Московский государственный институт культуры
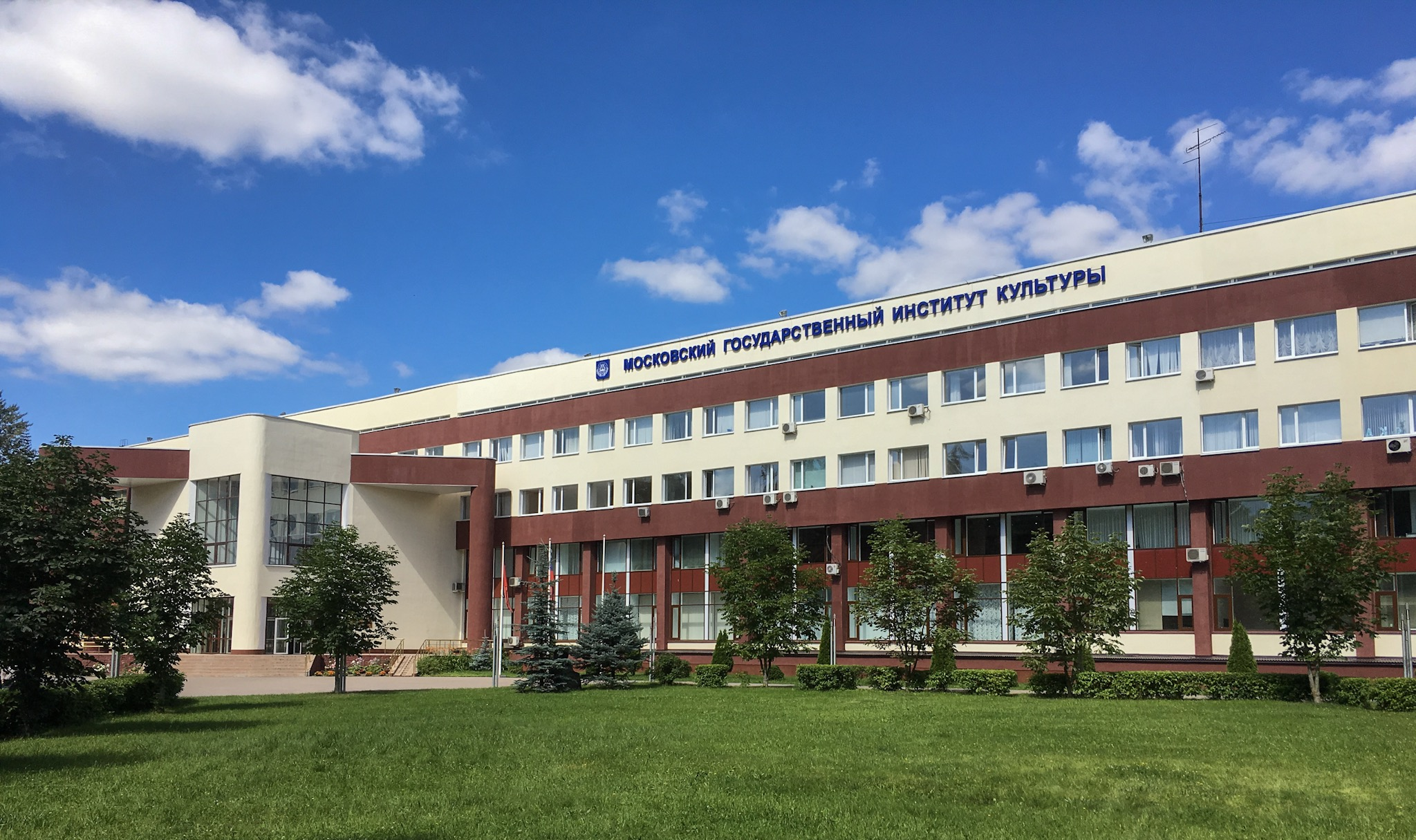
- Former names: Moscow State Art and Cultural University
- Type: College
- Established: 1913
- Location: Moscow, Russia; 55°53′39″N 37°28′30″E
- Website: mgik.org
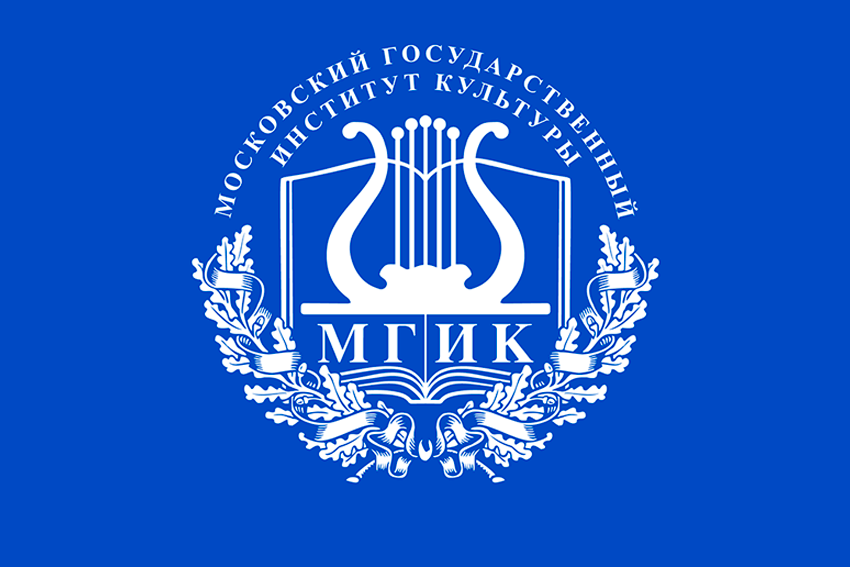

Moscow State Institute of Culture (Russian: Московский государственный институт культуры), formerly known as Moscow State Art and Cultural University (Russian: Московский государственный университет культуры и искусств) is a Russian university, a vocational training center in the field of culture and art, located in the Levoberezhny District, Khimki, Moscow Oblast. It is under control of the Ministry of Culture of the Russian Federation.

== History ==
Created by the decision of the Sovnarkom July 10, 1930, on the initiative of Nadezhda Krupskaya as the Moscow Library Institute. The first director was Henrietta Karlovna Derman. The first building was in the center of Moscow on Moss Street. In 1936, the Institute moved to the town of Khimki. In 1940 the Institute was elevated in status, and became a State Institute, bearing the name of Vyacheslav Molotov until 1957. In 1964 it was transformed into the Moscow State Institute of Culture. In 1980, the university was awarded the Order of the Red Banner. In 1994 he received university status and in 1999 renamed the Moscow State University of Culture and Arts (MGUKI). In 1994 the University has been identified as a basic school, where it was created by a teaching union of Russian higher educational institutions on education in traditional art and culture, socio-cultural activities and information resources. It consists of five teaching tips for eight specialties and training.
