= Sergey Sarychev =

Russian politician

- Сергей Сарычев

Vice Governor of Tyumen Oblast
- In office 29 May 2018 – 16 May 2022
- Succeeded by: Olga Kuznechevskikh

Governor of Tyumen Oblast (acting)
- In office 18 May 2018 – 29 May 2018
- Preceded by: Vladimir Yakushev
- Succeeded by: Aleksandr Moor

Vice Governor of Tyumen Oblast
- In office 15 January 2004 – 18 May 2018

Deputy Governor of Khanty-Mansi Autonomous Okrug
- In office 2001–2003

Deputy Governor of the Tyumen Region - Director of the Department for Culture, Youth and Sports
- In office 1997–2001

Chairman of the Committee on Youth Affairs and Tourism of the Tyumen Oblast Administration
- In office 1992–1997

Personal details
- Born: Sergey Mikhailovich Sarychev; 1 August 1959 (age 66) Vikulovo, Russia, Soviet Union
- Party: United Russia

Sergey Mikhailovich Sarychev (Russian: Сергей Михайлович Сарычев; born 1 August 1959) is a Russian politician, who served as the vice-governor of the Tyumen Oblast from 2018 to 2022, and the interim governor of the Tyumen Oblast in May 2018.

== Biography ==
Sergey Sarychev was born on 1 August 1959 in the village of Vikulovo, Tyumen Oblast. He began his working career in 1978 working at the Omsk Motor-Building Plant. From 1978 to 1980, he served in the Soviet Army. Since 1983 he has been working in the Komsomol. Until 1987, he held the positions of instructor, second and first secretary of the Ishim City Committee of the Komsomol. From 1987 to 1991, he was the Secretary of the Tyumen Regional Committee of the Komsomol. From 1992 to 1997, Sarychev worked in the administration of the Tyumen Oblast as chairman of the committee for youth affairs and tourism.

In 1997, he was appointed Deputy Governor of the Tyumen Oblast.

From 2001 to 2003, Sarychev was the Deputy Governor of the Khanty-Mansi Autonomous Okrug, and the head of the department for organizing the activities of the Okrug government.

From 2003 to 2005, Sarychev was appointed Deputy Governor of the Tyumen Oblast, until since 2005 the term has changed to vice-governor.

From 18 May to 29 May 2018, Sarychev was the acting governor of the Tyumen Oblast. He became vice-governor once again when Aleksandr Moor was appointed acting governor and officially sworn in office on 14 September 2018.

== In popular culture ==
He is a character in the novel by V. L. Strogalshchikov "Layer-2".
