= School of Advanced Studies =

Russian academic institute, University of Tyumen

School of Advanced Studies (SAS)
- Школа перспективных исследований
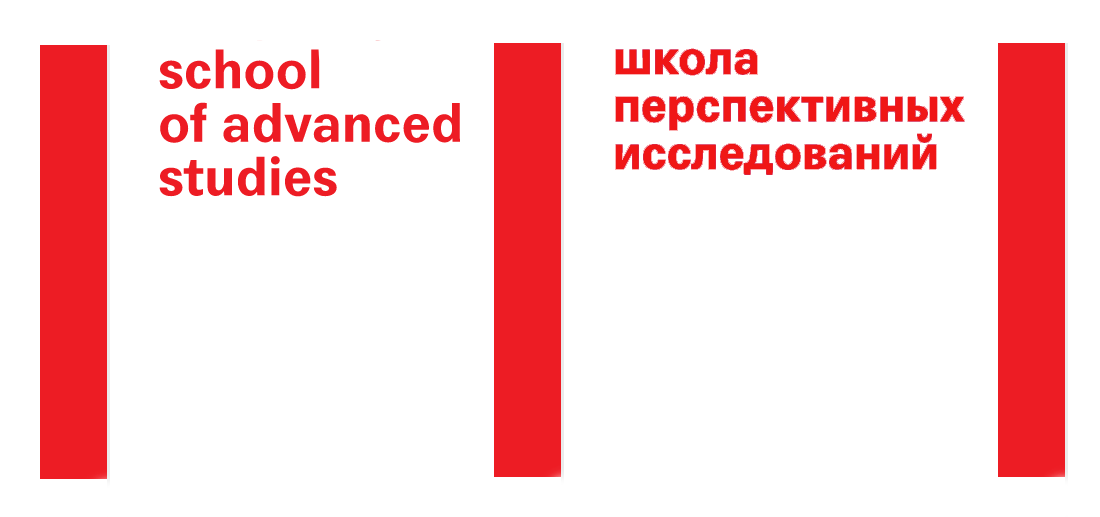
- Type: Public, honors college
- Established: 2017
- Director: Igor Chubarov
- Academic staff: 11 full-time professors
- Students: 155
- Undergraduates: 155
- Postgraduates: 0
- Location: 8 Marta St, 2k1, Tyumen, Tyumen Oblast, Russia
- Website: sas.utmn.ru

The School of Advanced Studies (SAS; Russian: Школа перспективных исследований) is a greenfield experimental higher institution at the University of Tyumen in Siberia, Russia, focusing on teaching and multidisciplinary research. It was founded by Andrey Shcherbenok who died on the 12th of April, 2025.

== Academics ==
SAS curricula contains core and elective courses. Electives are courses that both permanent and visiting faculty offer for all the SAS students based on the faculty's research interests. Out of 4 weekly sessions, one is reserved for student teamwork. In the academic year 2019–20, SAS offered 31 different electives.

During the first two years, students follow the core curriculum and also take elective courses. Afterwards, students declare one of the seven majors: Information Technology and Digital Society, Cultural Studies, Economics, Film and Media Studies,International relations, and Sociology and Anthropology. Additionally, students complete one of the minors.

In addition to the BA program, SAS used to offer a Master program: Master of Arts in Experimental Higher Education. The Experimental Higher Education (MA X-HE) program was launched in 2020. It was a 2-year long program which aimed to train its students to become professionals in higher education, focusing on educational innovations. Innovative and experimental teaching methods are also implemented in undergraduate study programs, such as the use of Wikipedia as a tool for academic service learning to foster students' development of 21st century skills.

=== Research ===
SAS research is carried out in multidisciplinary research teams. In 2020, there were four research teams operating within SAS:

- Citizenship Reframed: Reimagining Political Belonging through the Environment, Psychology, and Visuality;
- Education in the Tragic Key: Learning in an age of Crisis and Anxiety;
- Free Will, Consciousness, Determinism: An Interdisciplinary Investigation;
- Unnaturally Human: Enhancement and Manipulation of Human Capacity to Perceive and Perform.

=== Faculty ===
SAS faculty are a combination of full-time professors and visiting professors. Faculty are selected via the Project Design Session cluster hiring process, based on how they perform in multidisciplinary teamwork exercises.

=== Academic writing center ===
The Academic writing center helps SAS students with their writing by offering them feedback in the form of one-on-one consultations. The AWC also organises workshops for the students.

== Outreach ==
During the academic year, SAS offers open courses twice a week, which are free for the public to attend, are recorded and published on the School's YouTube channel. Every summer, SAS runs a summer school for high-school students.

Each year, SAS organizes a conference. The past conferences include:

- Disciplinary Landscape — 2020, "Dare to Experiment: Higher Education between Safety and Danger";
- Love is Revolting: interdisciplinary symposium;
- The ultimate goal of the workshop is to find a path forward for the research on materiality and love, but even more so for an interdisciplinary rapport;
- Disciplinary Landscape — 2018, "Critical Thinking in Academia Today";
- Disciplinary Landscape — 2017, "Disciplinary Regimes of Truth";
- The Duration of Immersion

== Controversy ==
Natalia Savelyeva, a sociologist who worked at SAS and interviewed faculty and students about their experience, published an article in openDemocracy in 2020, where she described it as an "abusive institution" and an "academic sweatshop."

An analysis representing an opposing view of SAS has been published by a team of Stanford graduate students who interviewed management-approved faculty and administrators under the title "Reimagining Russian Higher Education".

In 2023 Doxa published an article by former SAS professor Tomasz Blusiewicz who was fired for opposing Russian full-scale invasion of Ukraine.
