= Pavel Tarakanov =

Russian politician (born 1982)

- Павел Тараканов
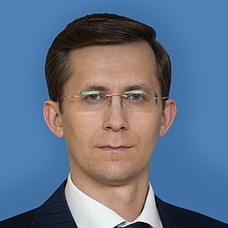

Senator from Tyumen Oblast
- Incumbent
- Assumed office 27 September 2018
- Preceded by: Stepan Kirichuk

Personal details
- Born: Pavel Tarakanov; 21 June 1982 (age 44) Chișinău, Moldavian SSR, Soviet Union
- Party: United Russia
- Education: Chechen State University

Pavel Vladimirovich Tarakanov (Russian: Павел Владимирович Тараканов; born 21 June 1982) is a Russian politician serving as a senator from Tyumen Oblast since 27 September 2018.

== Career ==
Pavel Tarakanov was born on 21 June 1982 in Chișinău, Moldavian Soviet Socialist Republic. In 2003, he graduated from the Chechen State University. Afterward, he worked in the Walking Together as a head of the Chechen branch of the organization. From 2005 to 2007, he was the head of the organization. He left the position to become a deputy of the State Duma. Afterward, Tarakanov was appointed Deputy Governor of the Tyumen Oblast Vladimir Yakushev. On 27 September 2018, he became the senator from Tyumen Oblast.

== Sanctions ==
Pavel Tarakanov is under personal sanctions introduced by the European Union, the United Kingdom, the USA, Canada, Switzerland, Australia, Ukraine, New Zealand, for ratifying the decisions of the "Treaty of Friendship, Cooperation and Mutual Assistance between the Russian Federation and the Donetsk People's Republic and between the Russian Federation and the Luhansk People's Republic" and providing political and economic support for Russia's annexation of Ukrainian territories.
