= Aleksandr Moor =

Russian politician

- Александр Моор
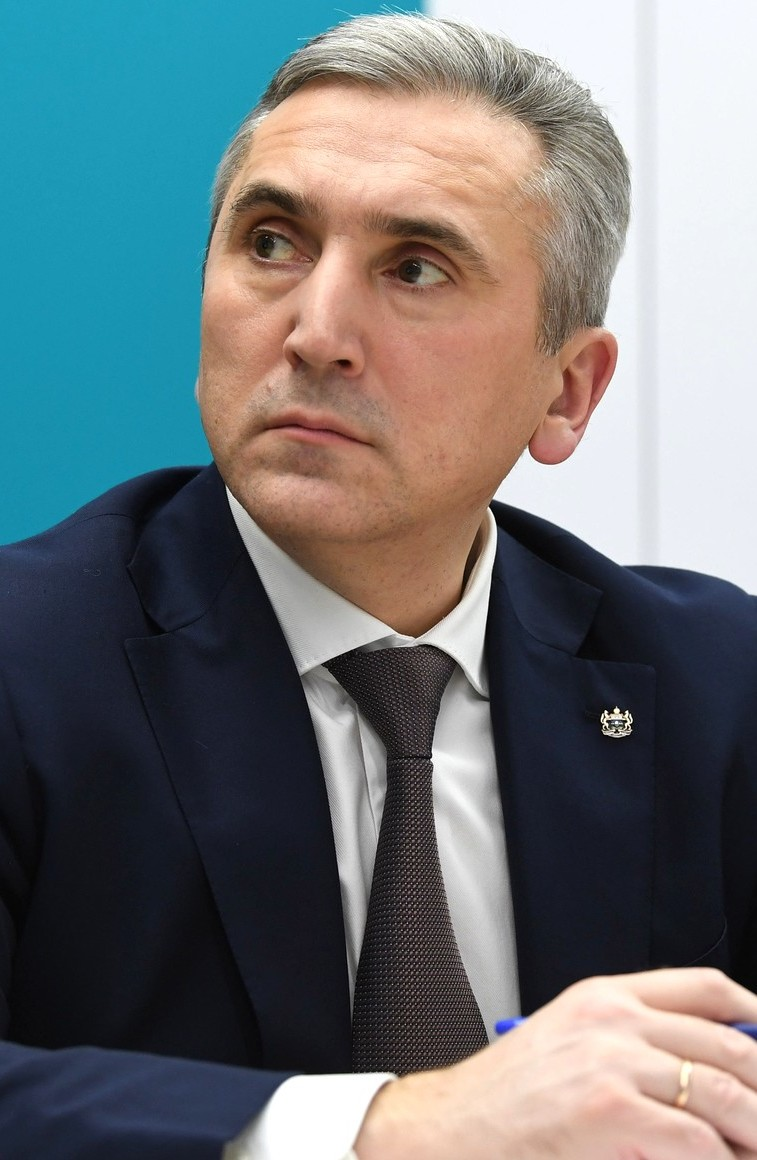
- Moor in 2020

5th Governor of Tyumen Oblast
- Incumbent
- Assumed office 14 September 2018
- Preceded by: Sergey Sarychev (acting)

Governor of Tyumen Oblast (acting)
- In office 29 May 2018 – 14 September 2018

Head of Tyumen
- In office 25 February 2011 – 29 May 2018
- Preceded by: Yevgeny Kuyvashev
- Succeeded by: Ruslan Kukharuk

Deputy Governor of Tyumen Oblast
- In office 26 December 2005 – 25 February 2011

Personal details
- Born: 6 January 1974 (age 52) Bereznyaki, Russian SFSR, Soviet Union
- Party: United Russia

Aleksandr Viktorovich Moor (Russian: Александр Викторович Моор; born 6 January 1974) is a Russian politician who has served as the fifth Governor of Tyumen Oblast since 14 September 2018.

He was also the Member of the Presidium of the State Council of Russia from January 28 until 2 August 2019 and again since 21 December 2020. He is also the member of the Supreme Council of the United Russia party.

Moor had also served as head of the Tyumen City Administration from 2011 to 2018.

== Biography ==
=== Early years ===
Aleksandr Moor was born on 6 January 1974, in the village of Bereznyaki, Tyumen district, Tyumen Oblast.

His mother, Alevtina Nesterovna, is a mathematics teacher at Tyumen gymnasium No. 49. His father, Viktor Aleksandrovich, is an auto mechanic.

His grandfather on the father's side, from whom he gets his surname, was a Volga German who has been executed during the Stalin's purges, while the rest of his family was sent to Tyumen Oblast in exile.

=== Education ===
In 1991, he graduated from the 49th gymnasium with a gold medal.

In 1996, he graduated from Tyumen State University with a degree in accounting and auditing with the qualification of an economist.

He also graduated from advanced training courses of the Russian Academy of National Economy and Public Administration under the President of the Russia.

=== Labor activity ===
==== Business career ====
While studying at the university, since 1994, he began to work at the Tyumen Credit Bank. In April 1997, he moved to the Tyumen bank Diplomat, where he rose to the post of vice president. From May 2000 to March 2001 he worked as deputy chairman of the board of another Tyumen bank - "White North". Then, for 4 months, he successively headed the control and audit department and the treasury of the Khanty-Mansiysk Bank.

==== Work in government ====
The first period of work of Moor in the civil service lasted from July 2001 to July 2003, when he served as deputy director of the Department of Economics of the Tyumen Region Administration. Then there was a break for two years, during which he was the general director of the Tyumen Central Department Store.

Starting in June 2005, Moor again works in the government. Until the end of 2005, he headed the department of property relations of the administration of the city of Tyumen, and on December 26 of the same year he was transferred to the post of deputy governor of the Tyumen region.

==== Head of the Tyumen City Administration ====
On 25 February 2011, Moor was unanimously elected to the post of head of the Tyumen city administration, which in its functions is similar to the status of a city manager. He is also the secretary of the Tyumen city branch of the United Russia party.

==== Governor of Tyumen Oblast ====
On 29 May 2018, by decree of Russian President Vladimir Putin, Moor was appointed Acting Governor of the Tyumen Region.

On 9 September 2018, Moor was elected Governor of the Tyumen Oblast for a term of five years. He took office on 14 September.

According to the Rating Center for Information Communications, which compiled the National Rating of Governors for March–April 2019 based on a survey and questionnaire survey of a large number of experts, analysts and political scientists, Moor took third place in this rating among all heads of the subjects of the Federation, behind Alexey Dyumin and Sergey Sobyanin.

From January 28 to August 2, 2019 and from December 21, 2020, he is the Member of the Presidium of the State Council of Russia.

== Income ==
The total amount of declared income for 2017 was 5 million 562 thousand rubles. For the spouse, 3 million 600 thousand rubles.

== Family ==
He is married and has four children. He is of partial Volga German descent on his father's side.
