= Ministry of Construction, Housing and Utilities =

Government minister of Russia

Ministry of Construction, Housing and Utilities of the Russian Federation
- Министерство строительства и жилищно-коммунального хозяйства Российской Федерации; Ministerstvo stroitelstva i zhilishchno-kommunalnogo khozyaystva Rossiiskoi Federatsii
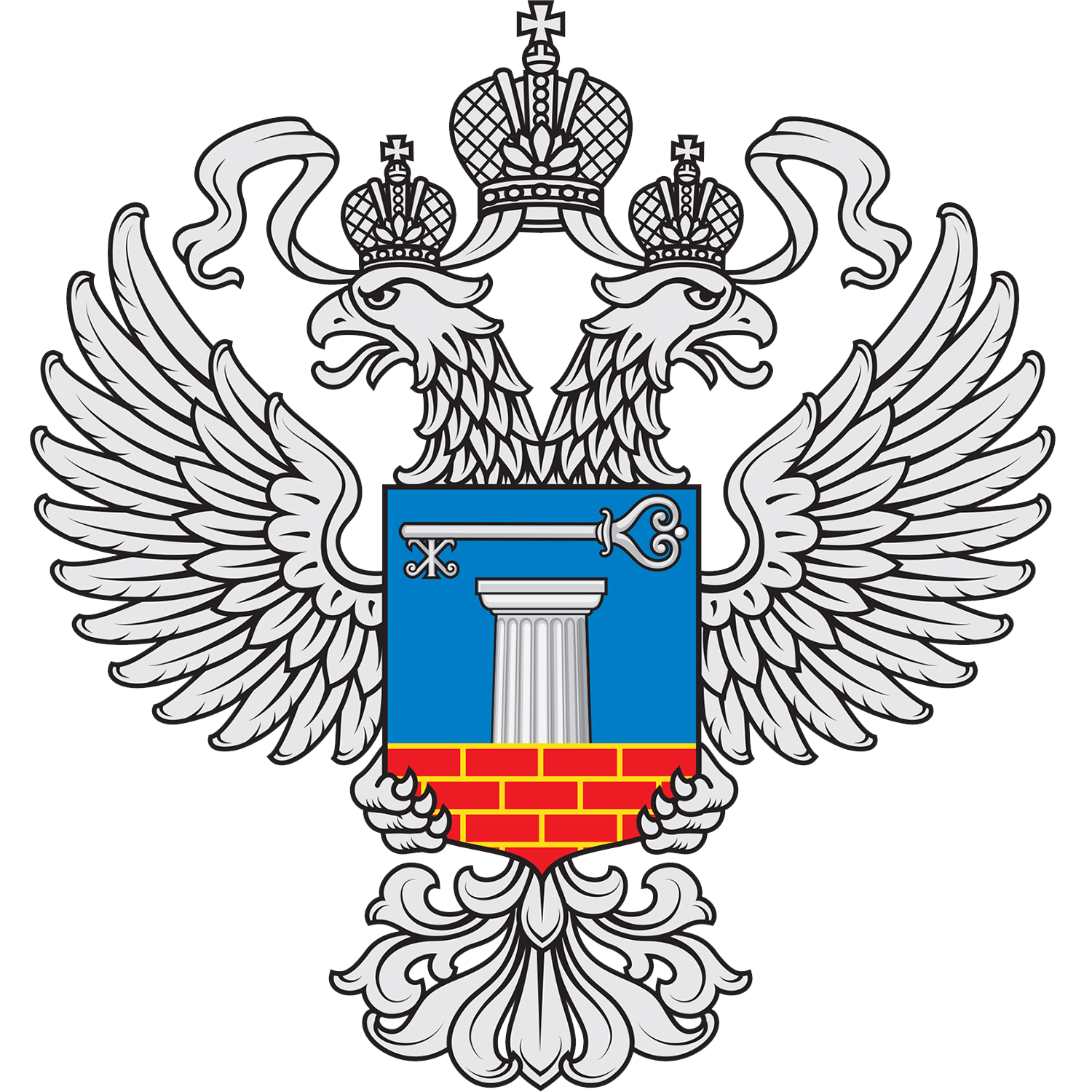

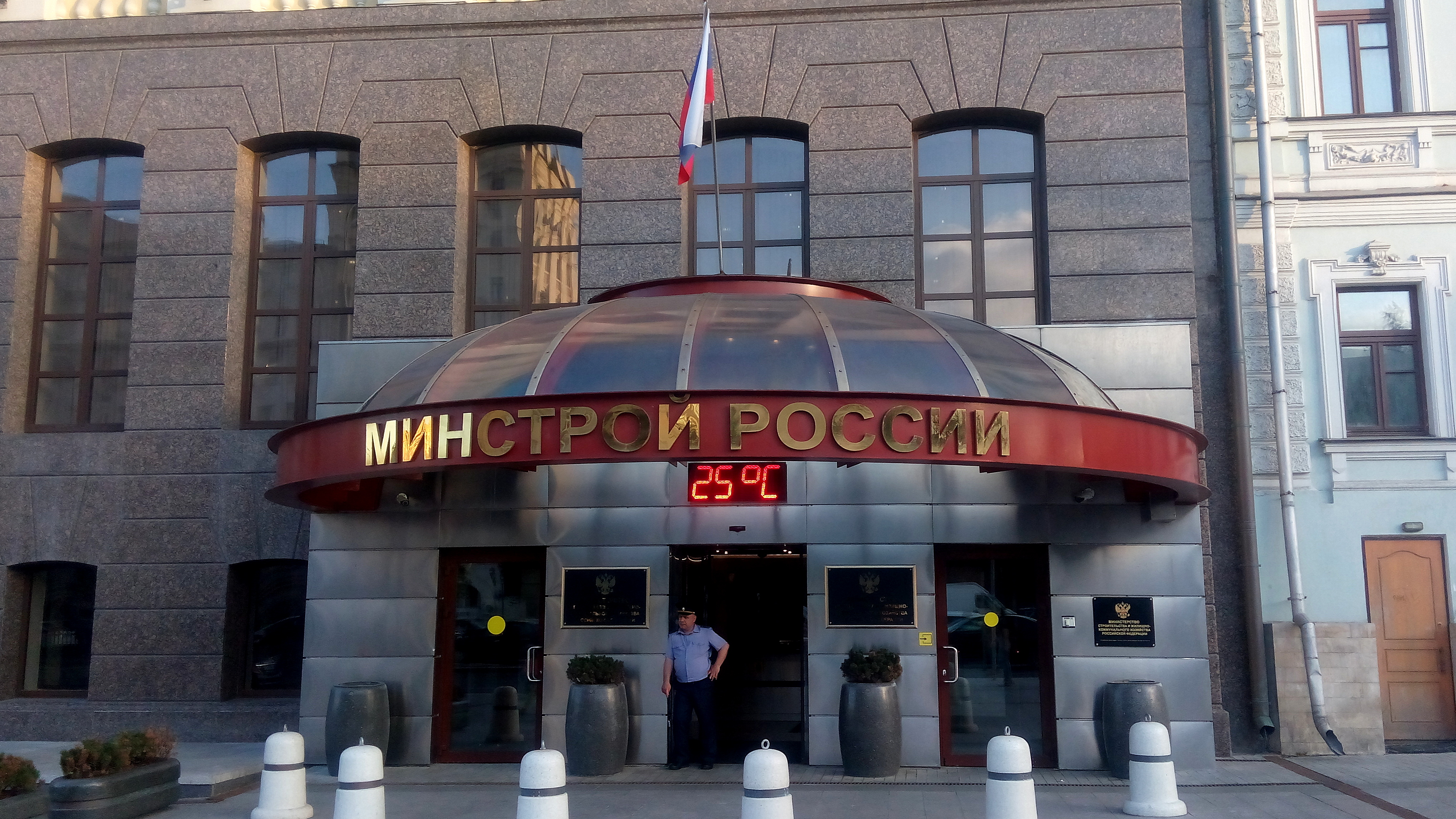

Agency overview
- Formed: 1 November 2013
- Preceding agency: Rosstroy
- Jurisdiction: Government of Russia
- Headquarters: Sadovaya-Samotechnaya str., 10/23, building 1, Moscow, Russia; 55°46′22″N 37°36′55″E
- Minister responsible: Irek Faizullin, Minister
- Website: Minstroyrf.gov.ru

The Ministry of Construction, Housing and Utilities (Minstroy; Russian: Министерство строительства и жилищно-коммунального хозяйства Российской Федерации (Минстрой России), romanized: Ministrestvo stroitelstva i zhilishchno-kommunalnogo khozyaystva Rossiyskoy Federatsii (Minstroy Rossii)) is a government ministry in the Cabinet of Russia.

The ministry is based on the federal construction agency Rosstroi, absorbs the functions of all the agencies overseeing the country's construction and utilities sectors according to the presidential spokesman Dmitry Peskov.

== Background ==
In his announcement on the decision to create the ministry in Novo Ogaryovo residence, President of Russia Vladimir Putin offered the post to the governor of Ivanovo Oblast, Mikhail Men and said that "construction is to a certain degree the economy driver. And with regard to housing, needless to say - we are already sick and tired of problems in this sphere”.

== Minister ==
- Mikhail Men (1 November 2013 — 18 May 2018)
- Vladimir Yakushev (18 May 2018 — 9 November 2020)
- Irek Faizullin (since 10 November 2020)
