= Tyumen Oblast Duma =

Regional parliament of Tyumen Oblast, Russia

Tyumen Oblast Duma Тюменская областная дума
- 7th legislature

Type
- Type: Unicameral

Leadership
- Chairman: Sergey Korepanov, United Russia since 2021

Structure
- Seats: 48
- Political groups: United Russia (38) CPRF (4); LDPR (4) SRZP (2)

Elections
- Voting system: Mixed
- Last election: 19 September 2021
- Next election: 2026

Meeting place
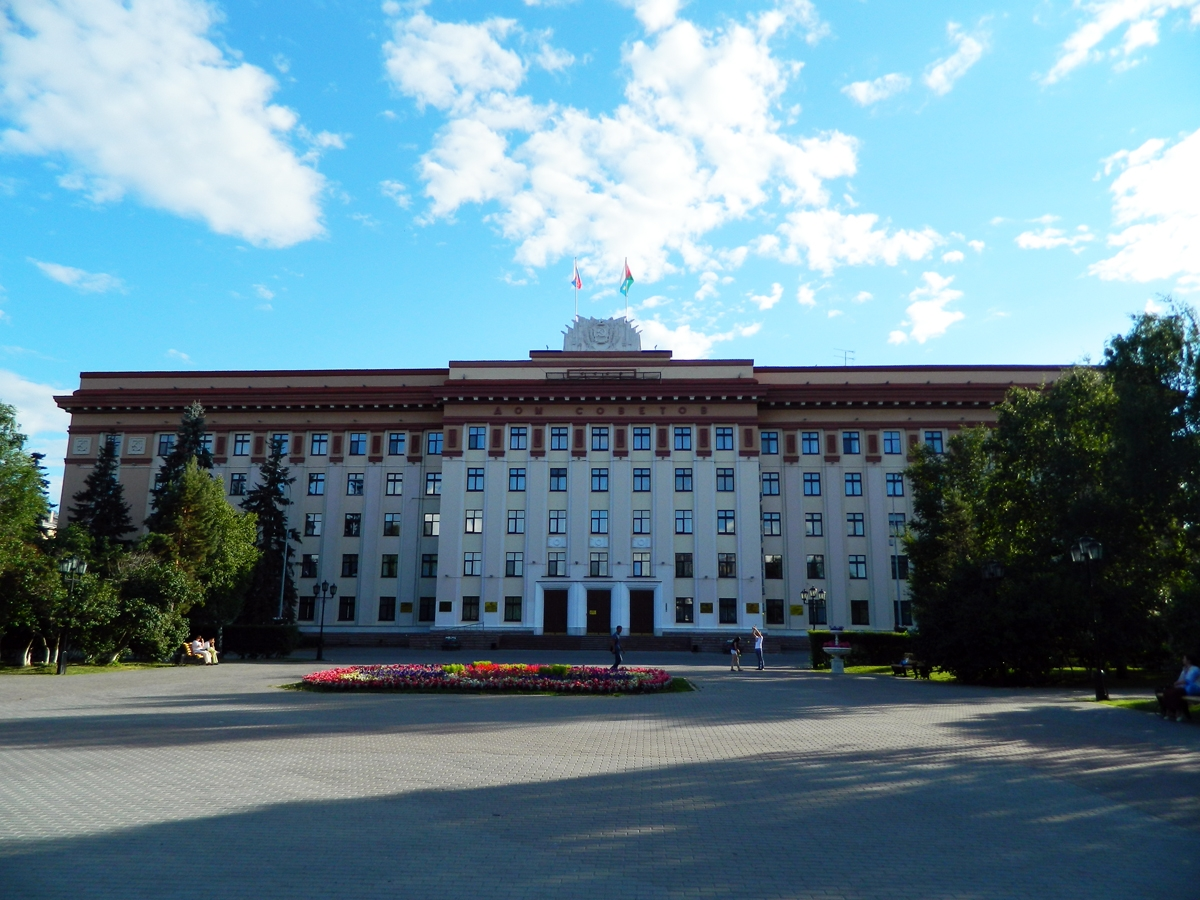
- 52 Republic Street, Tyumen

Website
- duma72.ru

The Tyumen Oblast Duma (Russian: Тюменская областная дума, romanized: Tyumenskaya oblastaya duma) is the regional parliament of Tyumen Oblast, a federal subject of Russia. A total of 48 deputies are elected for five-year terms.

== Elections ==
=== 2021 ===
| Party | % | Seats |
|---|---|---|
| United Russia | 50.07 | 38 |
| Liberal Democratic Party of Russia | 12.72 | 4 |
| Communist Party of the Russian Federation | 11.94 | 4 |
| A Just Russia — For Truth | 7.47 | 2 |
| Communists of Russia | 4.74 | 0 |
| New People | 4.66 | 0 |
| Registered voters/turnout | 54.03 | |
