= AEC =

AEC may refer to:

== Organizations ==
=== Governance ===
- African Economic Community
- African Energy Chamber
- Alaska Engineering Commission
- ASEAN Economic Community
- Assessment and Evaluation Commission, a peace agreement monitoring commission in Sudan
- Assets Examination Committee, a military-appointed committee in Thailand
- Atomic Energy Commission (disambiguation), of various countries, especially:
  - United States Atomic Energy Commission
- Australian Electoral Commission

=== Business ===
- Aero Engine Controls, a Rolls-Royce plc company
- Aluminum Extruders Council, a US trade association
- Anger Engineering Company, in Milwaukee, Wisconsin, US, from 1913 to 1915
- Architecture, Engineering, & Construction, a collective term for three associated industries; e.g. Industry Foundation Classes
  - Sometimes also Facility Management (Operations) is added, and this is called "AECO"
- Arctic Economic Council
- Associated Equipment Company, a former British bus and lorry manufacturer
- Astro AEC, a Malaysia TV channel
- Automotive Electronics Council, a US qualification standard organization
- Advanced Electronics Company, Riyadh, Saudi Arabia

=== Education ===
- Army Educational Corps, later the Royal Army Educational Corps
- Asansol Engineering College, in West Bengal, India
- Assam Engineering College, in Guwahati city, India
- European Association of Conservatoires, the main association of colleges and university schools of music in Europe

=== Other organizations ===
- Catalan Space Agency (Agència Espacial de Catalunya)
- Antilles Episcopal Conference
- Ars Electronica Center, Linz, Austria
- Art Ensemble of Chicago, US

== Science and technology ==
- 3-amino-9-ethylcarbazole, an immunohistochemistry stain (chromogen)
- Abstract elementary class, in mathematical logic
- Acoustic echo cancellation, in telephony
- Active electrical cable, a type of active cable which uses copper
- Automatic exposure control, in radiography
- Anion exchange capacity, in pedology (soil sciences)

== Sports ==
- America East Conference, an NCAA Division I athletic conference
- Atlantic East Conference, an NCAA Division III athletic conference

== Other uses ==
- Acoustic echo cancellation
- Actually existing capitalism
- Angeles Electric Corporation
- Anti-Eviction Campaign, a South African social movement
- Attestation of College Studies, a college certificate in the Quebec, Canada
- Sa'idi Arabic (ISO 639-3 code)
