= Deenaalee Chase-Hodgdon =

Deg Xit'an and Sugpiaq commercial fisher and indigenous activist

- Occupation: Commercial fisher, storyteller, indigenous councilmember

Deenaalee Chase-Hodgdon is a Deg Xit'an and Sugpiaq commercial fisher, storyteller, and indigenous council leader. They (Note: Hodgdon uses they/them pronouns.) co-founded indigenous-focused mutual aid group Smokehouse Collective and also founded and serve as executive director of On The Land Media. They also served as chair of the Arctic Athabaskan Council of Alaska, Vice-Chair of the Arctic Athabaskan Council, and the Arctic Athabaskan Council's youth representative to the Arctic Council.

== Biography ==
They are Deg Xitʼan and Sugpiaq, and were raised between Anvik and South Naknek. Their father was involved in the commercial fishing industry. From a young age, they were interested in becoming a commercial fisher, but they soon started to learn about the harms that have been caused by the commercial fishing industry in Alaska and learn about the environmental impact to the salmon population caused by climate change. They earned a Bachelors of Arts in Anthropology from Brown University.

After their father died in 2014, they became a commercial fisher. They started fishing out of Dillingham at the age of 22, and also worked at Denali National Park and Preserve as a raft and cultural guide. In 2023, they co-founded the Smokehouse Collective, a mutual-aid group meant to support communities whose traditional staple food is salmon and revitalize traditional processing and harvesting techniques, as well as protect Bristol Bay. Hodgdon has stated that they also want to expand into processing moose, caribou, and berries. They envision the future of the project as a network of food hubs to support communities when need occurs.

They served as chair of the Arctic Athabaskan Council of Alaska, as Vice-Chair of the Arctic Athabaskan Council, and as the Council's youth representative to the Arctic Council.

They are also the executive director and founder of On The Land Media, where they host the On The Land podcast. They received a grant from the NDN Collective to fund their media work. The first season focused on the story of the Circumpolar peoples.

They frequently attend hearings on indigenous rights and land use. However, they decline the title of activist, viewing it as something that "has a lot of political weight to it."

Hodgdon was awarded the Maxwell Hanrahan Food Award in 2023. They were named to the Grist 50 in 2024. They are also a guest speaker at the Wilson Center.
