= Association of Arctic Expedition Cruise Operators =

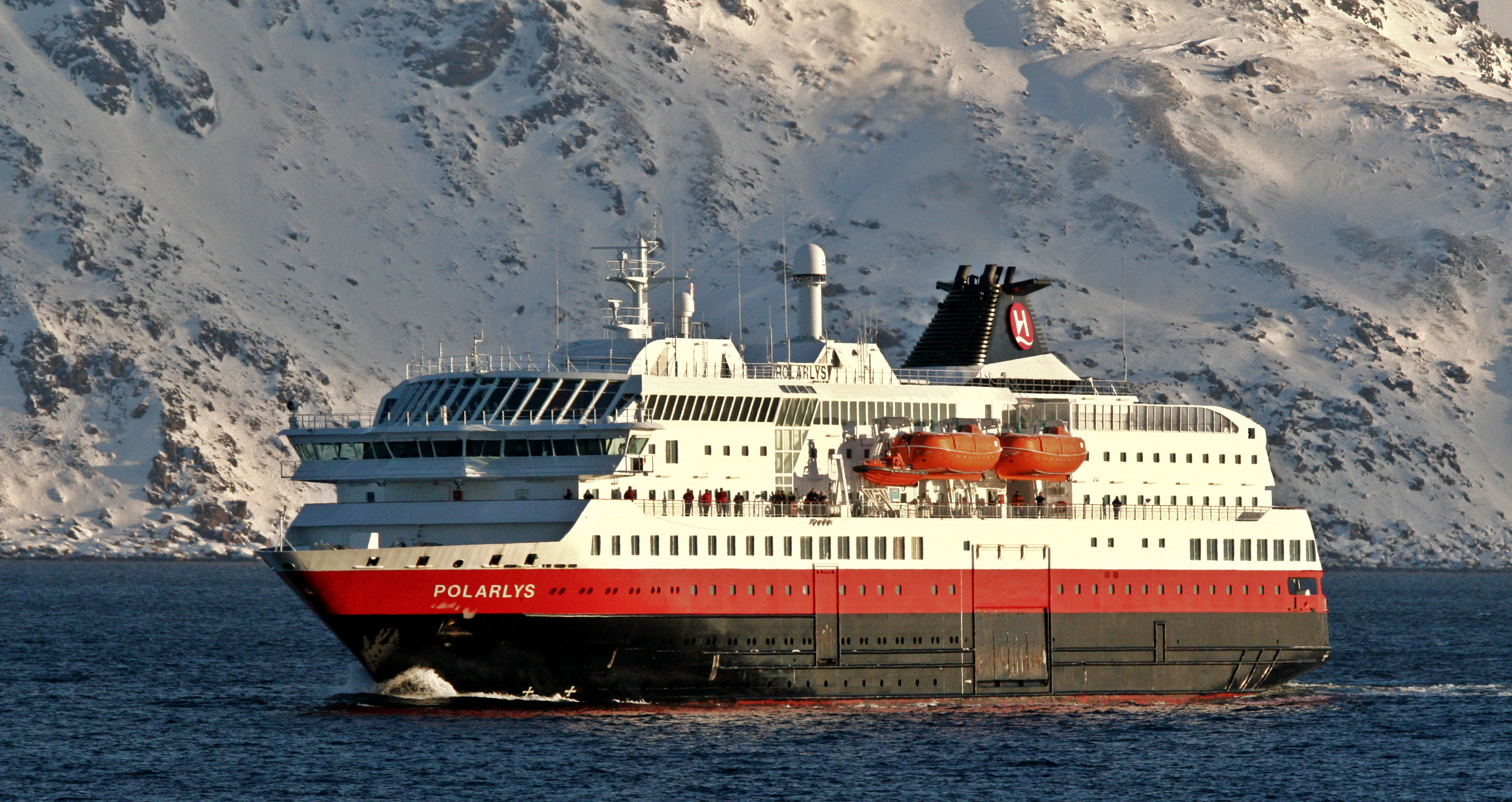
Hurtigruten ship M/S Polarlys between Havøysund and Hammerfest, winter 2006-2007

The Association of Arctic Expedition Cruise Operators (AECO) is a voluntary cooperative organization of cruise lines largely working in the European arctic, including Greenland and Svalbard. AECO establishes guidelines for its members that cover passenger safety, environmental protection issues and ethical interactions with indigenous populations.

== Role in Arctic Governance ==
The AECO has collaborated with Arctic governance bodies to address sustainability concerns associated with growing marine tourism in the region. According to the Arctic Council, AECO has worked with its Protection of the Arctic Marine Environment (PAME) Working Group to develop and standardize site-specific guidelines aimed at reducing environmental and cultural impacts and promoting safe operations in Arctic coastal areas.

== See also ==
- International Association of Antarctica Tour Operators
- Protection of the Arctic Marine Environment Working Group (PAME)
