= Arctic Economic Council =

Independent international business membership organisation

Arctic Economic Council (AEC)
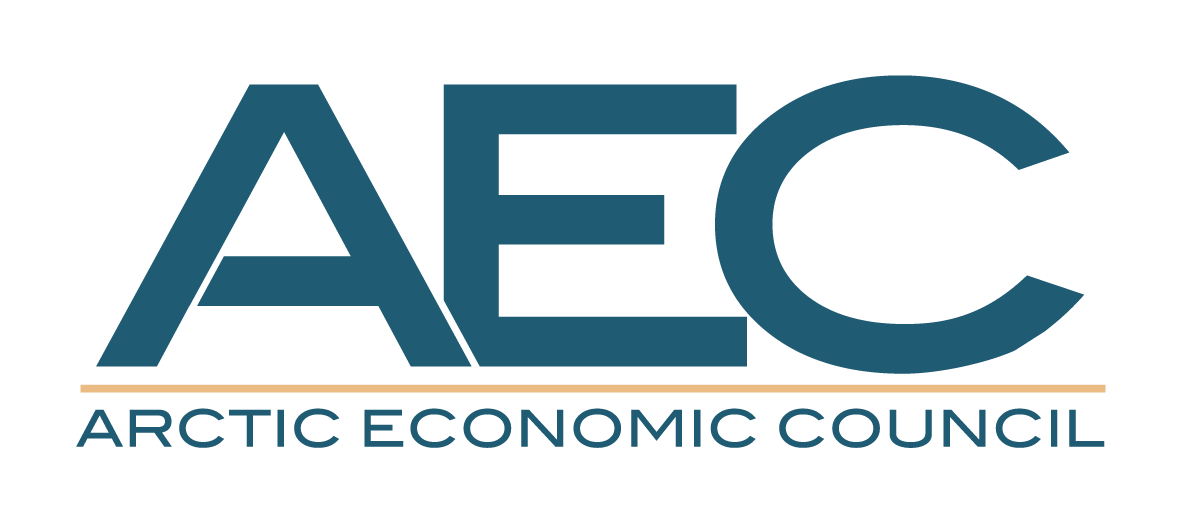
- 'Arctic Economic Council's Logo

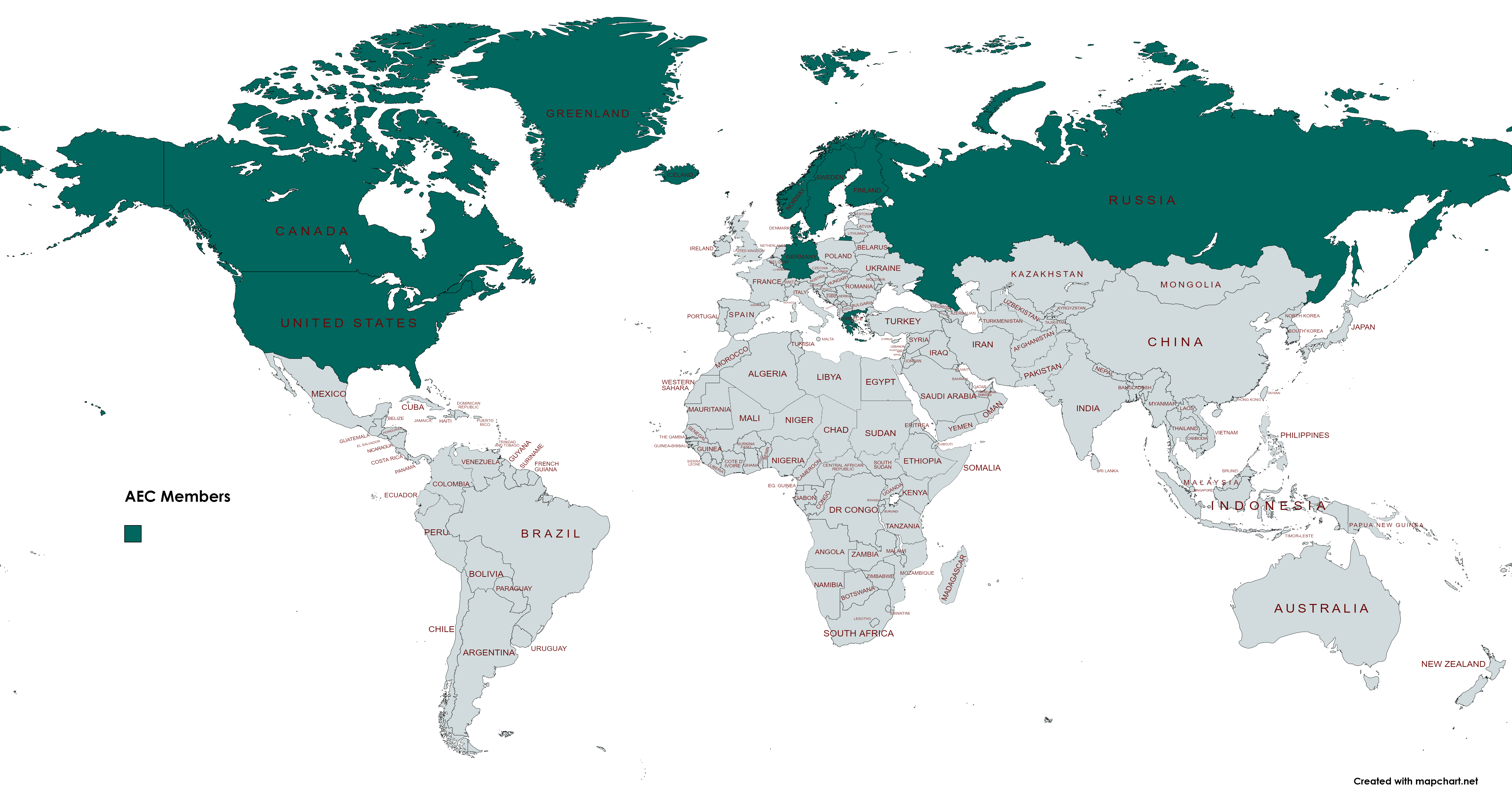
- Arctic Economic Council's Members
- Formation: Established 2–3 September 2014
- Founded at: Iqaluit, Nunavut, Canada
- Type: Independent international business membership organisation
- Purpose: Facilitating business-to-business activities and responsible economic development
- Headquarters: Tromsø, Norway
- Website: arcticeconomiccouncil.com

The Arctic Economic Council (AEC) is an independent international business membership organisation representing companies that work with and within the Arctic. The AEC advocates sustainable economic development in the region and represents a business perspective on sustainability. The AEC is the only regional business organisation in the Arctic and has members from all eight Arctic states.

Within its working groups, the Council aims to investigate framework conditions that would support business development and attract investments to the Arctic in a responsible manner and to the benefit of the local economies and population. Based on that, the AEC provides advice to the relevant policy-making stakeholders, including the Arctic Council. The AEC also provides a network for companies through its working groups and communicate to the general public about the business opportunities in the Arctic.

The AEC was founded on 2 September 2014 in Iqaluit, Nunavut, Canada. The headquarters are based in Tromsø, Norway. The council’s members are both multinational companies (MNCs) as well as small and medium-sized enterprises (SMEs) based and/or operating in the Arctic region, as well as Indigenous (circumpolar peoples) organisations as permanent participants.

== History ==
The AEC history is closely connected – yet independent from – the Arctic Council (AC). The AC, whose two major focus areas are environmental protection and sustainable development, has acknowledged the lack of business perspective on these issues. The AC Ministerial Meeting in May 2013 in Kiruna recognised the central role of business in the development of the Arctic and addressed the gap in communication with the regional business community.

The Arctic Council called for the creation of a forum where northerners and northern business enterprises could share ideas, solutions and exchange best practices with regards to social corporate responsibility, public-private partnerships (PPPs), community resilience, and capacity building of the Arctic populations. From this point on, a Task Force to Establish the Circumpolar Business Forum (TFCBF) was dedicated to this project, under the Canadian Chairmanship of the AC.

The official founding of the AEC happened in Iqaluit, Nunavut, Canada, on 2–3 September 2014. The headquarters for the Arctic Economic Council was opened by the Norwegian Minister of Foreign Affairs, Børge Brende, and head of the AEC Executive Committee, Tara Sweeney, on 8 September 2015 in Tromsø, Norway.

Today, the AEC is an independent business organisation that runs on membership fees.

The AEC has had two directors. The current director is Mads Qvist Frederiksen.

== Mission ==
The Arctic Economic Council was created to facilitate business opportunities, trade, and investment in a fair, inclusive and environmentally sound manner. It promotes cross-border business cooperation and attracts investments to the Arctic by developing commercial ties between the Arctic and the global economy.

At the same time, it collects and disseminates the best practices, through technological solutions, or the creation of business standards. Moreover, the AEC helps small and medium-sized enterprises, including that of Indigenous communities, to take part in the Arctic economic and business dialogue.

To do so, the AEC proceeds in the following sectors:

- Infrastructure and related matters including maritime transportation, communications and IT, and aviation;
- Energy, including oil, gas, and renewables;
- Mining;
- Tourism;
- Blue economy; and
- Human resources investments and capacity building.

The AEC works with a range of stakeholders. For instance, some of them are the European Union, the International Maritime Organisation, the Arctic Council, the University of the Arctic (UArctic), the World Economic Forum, the Woodrow Wilson International Center for Scholars (Wilson Center), or even the Korea Polar Research Institute (KOPRI). The AEC has been influential in highlighting the role of sustainable economic development and business in the Arctic for almost a decade.

== Membership and Structure ==
=== Membership ===
The AEC is composed over thirty five member companies, from the eight Arctic states (Canada, Denmark, including the Faroes and Greenland, Finland, Iceland, Norway, Sweden, Russia, and the United States), it has also members from the non-Arctic states (Greece, Switzerland, France), and Permanent Participant organisations (the Aleut International Association (AIA), the Inuit Circumpolar Council (ICC), the Arctic Athabaskan Council (AAC), and the Russian Association of Indigenous Peoples of the North (RAIPON) ). The AEC's members are all business representatives. These are divided into four categories:

- the Legacy Members, who have voting rights;
- the Permanent Participant organisations, who have voting rights;
- the Arctic Partners, composed of business representatives both from the Arctic states and non-Arctic states;
- the Permafrost Partners, who represent Arctic SMEs.

Multinationals, as well as small and medium enterprises, can, and have, become members of the AEC, as long as they operate in the Arctic region.

=== Structure ===
==== Executive Committee ====
The Executive Committee (EC) is a decision-making body normally consisting of four representatives and the AEC Chair, guiding the work of the Council. EC members represent companies based in Arctic states as well as Indigenous organisations. The EC is currently chaired by Russia and the other members are the outgoing chair (Iceland), the incoming chair (Norway), one more member (Finland) and the representative from the indigenous organisation (AIA).

==== AEC's headquarters ====
The headquarters in Tromsø provides administrative and organisational support to the AEC. It also runs communication and outreach, and facilitates networking events. It is run by the director and is co-located with NHO Arctic.

==== Chairmanship ====
The AEC Chairmanship rotates every two years from an Arctic state to another, mirroring the chairmanship of the Arctic Council. For the period 2021–2023, Russia chaired the AEC. In May 2023, Norway took over the chairmanship.

List of the AEC's Chairs over the years
Date	Country	Chairperson	Company
2015-2017	United States	Tara Sweeney	Arctic Slope Regional Corporation
2017-2019	Finland	Tero Vauraste	ICEYE
2019-2021	Iceland	Heiðar Guðjónsson	Sýn hf. (Vodafone)
2021-2023	Russia	Evgeny Ambrosov	Novatek
2023-2025	Norway	Inger Johnsen	Troms Kraft

== Functioning ==
=== Working groups ===
On 2–3 September 2014, the five working groups (WGs) were established to conceptualise, develop projects, provide funding and administrative support, and report back to the AEC on their progress. The working groups (WG) represent different industry clusters. The Working Groups can change over time depending on their mandate. The current working groups are:

- The Maritime Transport Working Group focuses on the collection and exchange of information on national and international maritime traffic in the Arctic, related regulations, and the development and status of hydrographic charting.
- The Investment and Infrastructure Working Group focuses on strengthening responsible investment guidelines and economic growth in the Arctic region.
- The Responsible Resource Development Working Group focuses on investigating challenges and investment drivers for natural resource exploration and development in the Arctic.
- The Connectivity Working Group is assessing different technological and infrastructural solutions to connect the Arctic's most remote regions to the rest of the world to stimulate economic growth in the region. The Connectivity Working Group has developed an investment matrix for investors in the Arctic.
- The Blue Economy Working Group is facilitating the creation of a pan-Arctic alliance of ocean clusters to leverage knowledge, expertise and funding instruments across the region to accelerate product development and economic growth in the sector.

=== Relationship with the Arctic Council ===
The Arctic Economic Council Secretariat and the Arctic Council Secretariat are both located in Tromsø, Norway. This provides greater opportunities for close cooperation. The current relationship between the Arctic Economic Council (AEC) and the Arctic Council (AC) is based on a memorandum of understanding (MoU) signed in May 2019, in Rovaniemi, Finland. The document is the result of the 2017 Fairbanks Declaration, which mentions on several occasions the Arctic Economic Council. In the Memorandum, the Arctic States’ Ministers sought greater cooperation between the two institutions in order "to enhance responsible economic development and to build partnerships for issues of common interest and capacity building of Arctic inhabitants".

The first joint meeting between the AEC and the AC was held in Reykjavík, Iceland. The meeting focused on "marine transportation and blue economy, telecommunications connectivity, responsible resource development and mainstream biodiversity, as well as on responsible investments and corporate social responsibility". After that, the experts from the AC working groups took part in the AEC working group meetings.

On 20 May 2021, the Arctic Council released a Strategic Plan for the period 2021–2030. One of the goals in the strategic plan is to strengthen cooperation between the Arctic Council and AEC.

Other international partnerships of the Arctic Economic Council
Document	Organisation	Year
MoU	Arctic Mayors' Forum	2024
MoU	Korea Arctic Research Consortium	2023
MoU	Standing Committee of Parliamentarians of the Arctic Region	2021
MoU	St. Petersburg Committee for Arctic Affairs	2021
MoU	Arctic Council	2019
MoU	University of the Arctic (UArctic)	2018

=== Relationship with the World Economic Forum ===
AEC work builds on the Arctic Investment Protocol (AIP), originally produced by the World Economic Forum (WEF) Global Arctic Agenda Council, and which the AEC has been hosting and promoting since 2017. According to the AIP, when investing in the Arctic, businesses must follow the six following principles:

- Build resilient societies through economic development;
- Respect and include local communities and Indigenous peoples;
- Pursue measures to protect the environment of the Arctic;
- Practice responsible and transparent business model;
- Consult and integrate science and traditional ecological knowledge; and
- Strengthen pan-Arctic collaboration and sharing of best practices.

=== National strategies, policies, white papers, and others referring to the AEC ===
The AEC is mentioned in several national strategies and policies referring to the Arctic.

Jurisdiction	Last Arctic strategy policy (year)
United Kingdom	2023
India	2022
France	2022
Iceland	2021
(European Union) European Commission	2021
(European Union) European Parliament	2021
Finland	2021
Netherlands	2021
Poland	2021
Russia	2020
Sweden	2020
South Korea	2019
Canada	2019
Scotland	2019
United Kingdom	2018
Spain	2016
France	2016
Japan	2015
