= Circumpolar clothing =

Circumpolar clothing or Eskimo clothing may refer to clothing worn by any of the numerous indigenous peoples of the Arctic. These peoples are sometimes referred to with the umbrella terms circumpolar peoples or Eskimo.

- Inuit clothing
- Yup'ik clothing
