= Russo-Ukrainian war and Arctic geopolitics =

Geopolitical consequences of the Russo-Ukrainian War since 2014

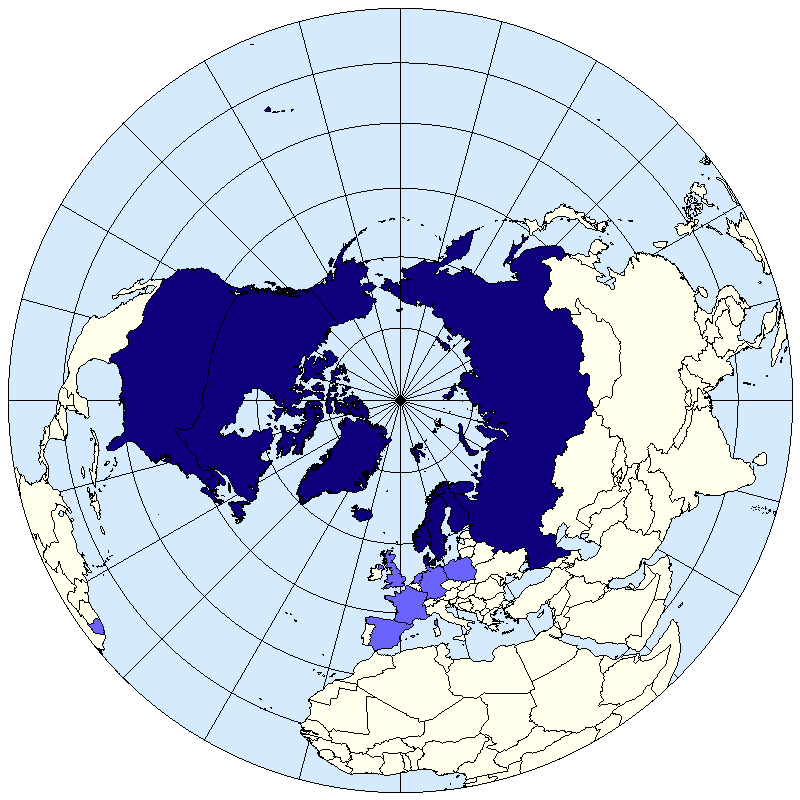
Map of Arctic Council members
Member states
Observer states

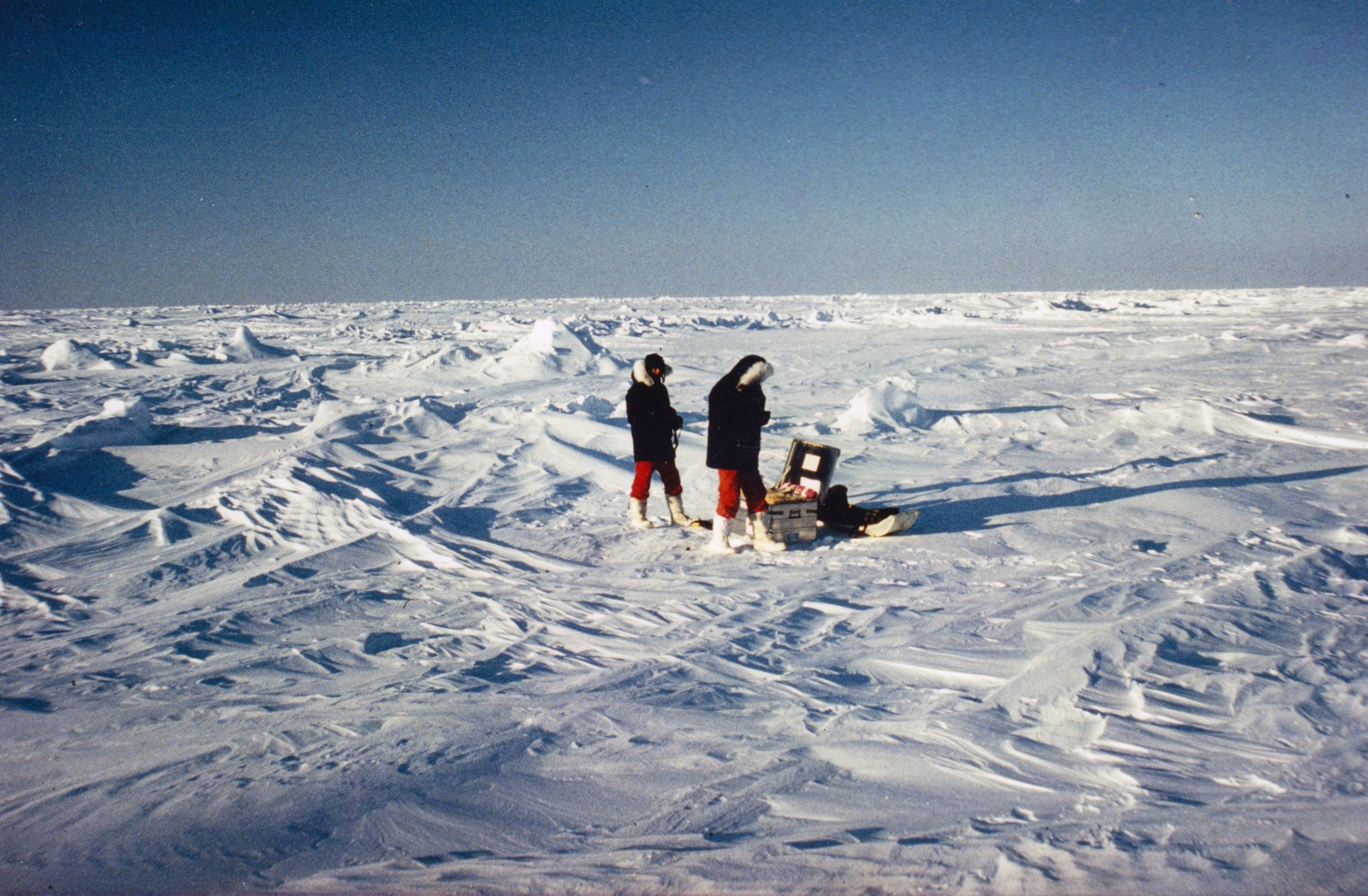
The Arctic ice pack at the North Pole. Expedition members are taking air samples.

The Russo-Ukrainian War has had significant geopolitical consequences in the Arctic region, including on the Arctic Council, an intergovernmental forum focused on Arctic issues that was founded in 1996 by eight Arctic states: Canada, Denmark, Finland, Iceland, Norway, Russia, Sweden, and the United States of America. While the Ottawa Declaration establishing the Council states that it must be a space for dialogue and cooperation that does not deal with matters regarding military security, the ongoing war has impacted the workings of the organization and relationships between its countries.

== 2014 Russian annexation of Crimea ==
In March 2014, Russia annexed the Ukrainian peninsula of Crimea, located on the northern coast of the Black Sea. The annexation followed the Revolution of Dignity, in which the pro-Russian government of President Viktor Yanukovych was overthrown. Russia's actions in Crimea were also claimed to be motivated by concerns about whether Crimea could be used as a NATO base. Today Crimea is a de facto part of the Russian Federation, however this is largely unrecognized by the international community.

The Russian annexation of Crimea was internationally condemned, which led to a large number of countries and international organisations imposing sanctions against Russia. The EU and the US, in particular, have imposed several sanctions such as assets freeze, travel bans, and furthermore the EU has canceled bilateral summits with Russia. The sanctions imposed on the Arctic encompass actions targeting Russia's Arctic offshore oil activities and the military collaboration with Russia in the region.

=== Political spillover in the Arctic ===
There have been a number of spillover effects after the annexation of Crimea on the presence of other states in the region, as well as Arctic policy. Several states have revised their Arctic policies since 2014 as a consequence of the Crimea annexation and directly stated Russia as a cause of concern. Traditionally, the Nordic countries have handled security policy differently, but especially after the annexation of Crimea, the countries sought closer security cooperation.

The crisis has had an effect on the established discourse of the Arctic, where the annexation of Crimea has negatively affected Western perceptions of Russia and its intentions, in which the West considers Russia as an unpredictable power. This has led to a fundamental distrust of Russia in the West, especially due to the discrepancy between Russian actions and declarations. Due to the new context of increased mistrust of Russia, the West came to perceive Russia's military activity as potentially more aggressive than in past geopolitical contexts. Before the annexation of Crimea, Russia's activities were to a greater extent considered legitimate state behavior.

The annexation also challenged the established practices of security cooperation in the Arctic. NATO canceled all exercises with Russia, including the Northern Eagle naval exercise between the Norwegian, Russian, and US navies. Cooperation forums such as the annual Chiefs of Defense meeting were further canceled by the Arctic states.

==== Developments in the Arctic Council ====
The Arctic governance structures were challenged following the events in 2014. The increasingly tense relationship between Russia and the West after the annexation of Crimea had an effect on political cooperation in the Arctic Council. The EU had previously applied for observer status in the Arctic Council, which was agreed upon in principle at the Kiruna Ministerial Meeting in 2013. However, the finalization of the EU's observer status was put on hold due to the conflict, especially as Russia increasingly viewed the EU as an antagonistic geopolitical actor and therefore did not allow the EU observer status. Nonetheless, the EU maintained its de facto involvement within the Arctic Council and its various working groups. The US and Canada also decided to boycott Russian-organized or Russian-led meetings in the Arctic Council, as a part of their broader recalibration of relations with Russia. However, there was an agreement among Russia, the US, Canada, and the EU stating the importance of continuing pragmatic cooperation in the Arctic, and the boycott policy was thus not continued systematically. The Russo-Ukrainian war, and its geopolitical spillover effects, caused cooperative setbacks in the Arctic Council - but several scholars contend that the Arctic Council showed resilience in a difficult international situation and continued to seek common ground and shared practical solutions.

== 2022 Russian invasion of Ukraine ==
Current situation of the ongoing Russian invasion of Ukraine

The war escalated following the Russian invasion of Ukraine which began on 24 February 2022, when Vladimir Putin declared a "special military operation" would be carried out in Ukraine after Russia recognised the self-proclaimed Donetsk and Luhansk People's Republics. The invasion occurred after a long period in which Russia had expressed dissatisfaction with the enlargement of NATO. Russia thus presented a draft treaty in 2021 that challenged NATO's open door policy in relation to Ukraine, which the US and NATO rejected in January 2022.

Compared to the sanctions imposed during the Ukrainian crisis in 2014, the remaining seven Arctic states resorted to broader and more unprecedented sanctions against Russia following the invasion. The sanctions have been closely coordinated between Western states such as Canada and the US and the EU, and have predominately been imposed on the transport, finance, and energy sectors. The latest sanctions severely restrict Russia's capacity to engage in the exploration, production, transportation, and sale of oil or gas in the Arctic region. The sanctions have significantly impacted the Russian economy. Despite the extensive sanctions regimes, the Russian economy has shown resilience by trading more with neutral countries, such as China.

=== Political spillover in the Arctic ===
As a consequence of the Russian invasion of Ukraine, several Arctic states have updated their Arctic policy, as well as changed their strategy towards the region.

- United States: With the new national strategy for the Arctic region from October 2022, the US considers Russia as a more aggressive power, and therefore finds it urgent to establish a stronger presence in the Arctic region to protect American interests. The strategy seeks cooperation with allies, in this case other Arctic states, to promote peace and the rule of international law. The US has recently signed an agreement with Norway, which allows for training territory on Norwegian soil.
- Canada: In summer 2022, Canada agreed on a new $4.9 billion military defense program. It aims to detect and monitor military threats in the Arctic region. Additionally, Canada announced a purchase of F-35 fifth-generation fighters as a strategic replacement for its aging fleet of F-18s, further empowering its military capabilities.
- Norway: Norway had been open to cooperating and continuing dialogue with Russia after the annexation of Crimea in 2014. However, when voting for the Security Council's resolution on the Russian invasion of Ukraine in 2022, Norway expressed support for the intensified sanctions towards Russia, and thus changed its position to be a part of a stronger cooperation with its Western allies. As a consequence Russia has positioned strategic forces in the Arctic region next to the Norwegian border, hereby expanding Russian military infrastructure, which has heightened the geopolitical tensions.
- Denmark: On 1 July 2022, Denmark joined the EU cooperation on security and defense, hereby abolishing the Danish EU defense opt-out, which had otherwise been in force since 1993. The decision to join the EU defense pact was primarily framed by the Danish government as a consequence of the increased geopolitical tension that occurred after the invasion.
- Russia: Due to international sanctions, Russia has revised its position in the Arctic. Russia is now searching for new partners to continue their projects. Instead of cooperation with the Arctic states, Russia seeks new allies such as China, which has expressed interest in Arctic issues.

==== Expansion of Arctic states looking to join NATO ====
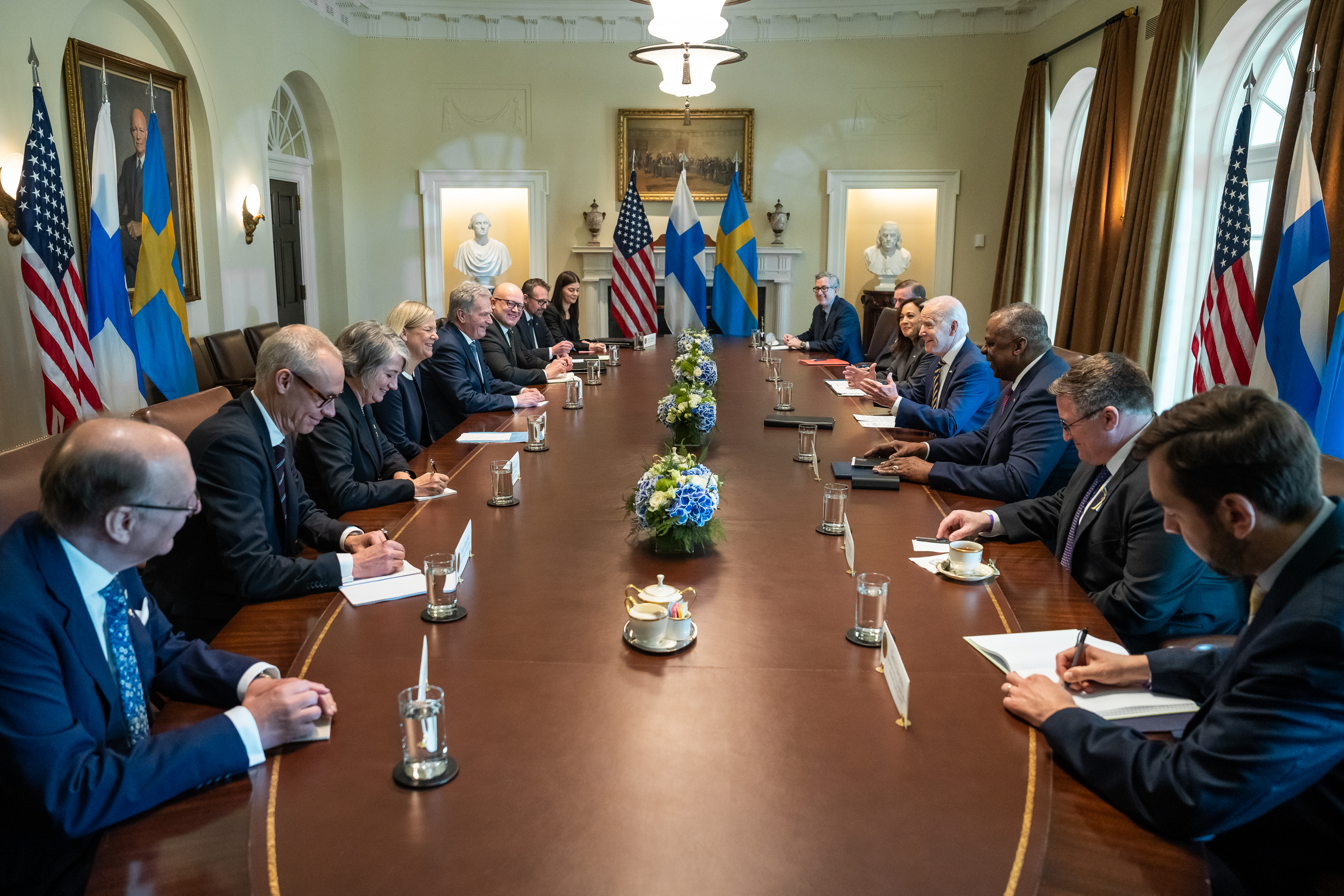
Discussion of Sweden's and Finland's NATO applications in Washington. US Vice President Kamala Harris, US President Joe Biden, Finnish President Sauli Niinistö, and Swedish Prime Minister Magdalena Andersson.

The Russian invasion of Ukraine has led to further expansion of NATO. Finland officially joined NATO on 4 April 2023 and Sweden joined NATO on 7 March 2024. Both Finland and Sweden have a long-standing position of neutrality, and their accession to NATO would constitute a significant change in international security. The inclusion of Sweden and Finland in NATO is thought to lock the Alliance into a more confrontational relationship with Russia and create a more strategically important space in Northern Europe, considering the accession of Finland will add 1,340 km. of land border with Russia. This expansion goes directly against Russia's intention to limit the territory of NATO, and from a Russian perspective is seen as a significant security challenge and destabilizer in the Arctic region. The expansion has given rise to increased geopolitical tension, as Vladimir Putin has stated that Russia would treat Finland as an enemy if the state joined NATO, and Russian nuclear weapons would be stationed in the region.

==== Developments in the Arctic Council ====
On 3 March 2022, the Arctic Council issued a joint statement in response to the Russian invasion of Ukraine, condemning Russia's unprovoked actions, and stressing that it will have extensive consequences for the collaboration. Russia chaired the Arctic Council at the time of the invasion (2021–2023), which the remaining Arctic states believed would create cooperation issues in the Council. In this context, the remaining Arctic states decided to suspend their participation in all Council meetings and subsidiary bodies, and refused to travel to Russia in connection with meetings, hence putting Arctic international cooperation on pause. By pausing the cooperation, Russia's efforts to deal with urgent Arctic issues during its time as chairman faced significant obstacles. This has led to consequences for the work with issues facing the Arctic e.g. climate change, the social welfare of indigenous peoples, and scientific research. In a second statement issued on 8 June, the members of the Arctic Council, with the exception of Russia, declared their plans to resume work on Council projects that do not involve Russian participation.

The accession of Finland in 2023, and Sweden in 2024 as member states of NATO will also have consequences for the Arctic Council, changing the dynamics of the Council, where all members except Russia will then be a part of the NATO alliance. The dichotomy of NATO against Russia could lead to an increased focus on militarization in the Council, as opposed to the peaceful cooperation that has long been intended.

Norway took on the Chairmanship of the Arctic Council on 11 May 2023, and a new framework for cooperation will therefore be established.

== Changes in geopolitical dynamics ==
The Arctic region has long been considered exceptional by scholars not only due to its climate and indigenous communities, but also due to its relative geopolitical isolation from conflicts in other regions. Peaceful collaboration has successfully mitigated global tension from other regions, which has made the region a ‘zone of peace and cooperation’. The Arctic region has for that reason long been considered an area with a low possibility of conflict.

Several scholars argue that the contemporary Arctic is characterized by conditions of modern international relations. The annexation of Crimea in 2014 and the invasion of Ukraine in 2022 are examples of conflicts that entail geopolitical spillovers which have increased the level of conflict in the Arctic region, especially in the Arctic Council. Scholars find that the Arctic Council was relatively resistant to the conflicts emerging from the annexation in 2014, while the cooperative core of the Council has been strongly challenged by the invasion of 2022, especially due to Russia's role as chairman. The enlargement of NATO is also found to have disrupted the dynamics in the region, thus creating an increased distance between Russia and the West. These changes in the international system challenge the traditional peaceful cooperation in the region and can be seen as severely disrupting Arctic exceptionalism. The Arctic is therefore argued to no longer be isolated and immune to the processes and dynamics occurring outside the region. Many experts therefore claim that the Arctic region needs to find "exceptional responses" to address the new exceptional challenges that characterize the contemporary Arctic.
