= Radiophobia =

Fear of ionizing radiation

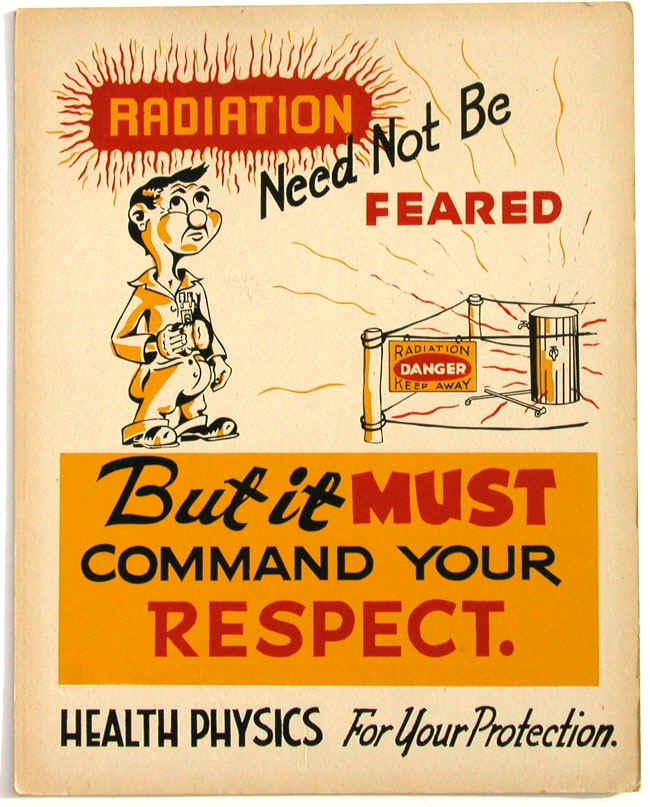
Health physics poster exhorting respect for—rather than fear of—radiation. (ORNL, 1947)

Radiophobia, a portmanteau of “radiation” and “phobia”, refers to fear of ionizing radiation exceeding the actuarial risk, leading to overestimating the health risks of radiation compared to other risks. However, when comparing the fear of radiation that is commonly encountered with the clinical criteria (e.g., in the Diagnostic and Statistical Manual of Mental Disorders (DSM-5), it is clear that radiophobia fundamentally is a misnomer. Lindberg & Archer (2022) defines "radiophobia" as “the socio-psychological and cultural relationship between individuals and ionising radiation, characterised by a clear disparity between the actual and perceived risks and health effects of radiation exposure”.

== Early use ==
The term appeared in a paper entitled "Radio-phobia and radio-mania" presented by Dr. Albert Soiland of Los Angeles in 1903. In the 1920s, the term described people who were afraid of radio broadcasting and receiving technology. In 1931, radiophobia was referred to in The Salt Lake Tribune as a "fear of loudspeakers", an affliction that Joan Crawford was reported as suffering. The term "radiophobia" was also printed in Australian newspapers in the 1930s and 1940s, assuming a similar meaning. The 1949 poem by Margarent Mercia Baker entitled "Radiophobia" laments the intrusion of advertising into radio broadcasts. The term remained in use with its original association with radios and radio broadcasting during the 1940s and 1950s.

During the 1950s and 1960s, the Science Service associated the term with fear of gamma radiation and the medical use of x-rays. A Science Service article published in several American newspapers proposed that "radiophobia" could be attributed to the publication of information regarding the "genetic hazards" of exposure to ionising radiation by the National Academy of Sciences in 1956.

In a newspaper column published in 1970, Dr Harold Pettit MD wrote:

"A healthy respect for the hazards of radiation is desirable. When atomic testing began in the early 1950s, these hazards were grossly exaggerated, producing a new psychological disorder which has been called "radiophobia" or "nuclear neurosis".

== Castle Bravo and its influence on public perception ==
On March 1, 1954, the operation Castle Bravo, testing a first-of-its-kind experimental thermonuclear Shrimp device, overshot its predicted TNT equivalent yield of 4–6 Mt and instead produced 15 Mt. This produced an unanticipated amount of Bikini snow or visible particles of nuclear fallout, which caught in its plume the Japanese fishing boat the Daigo Fukuryū Maru or Lucky Dragon outside the initially predicted ~5 Mt fallout area cordoned off for Castle Bravo. Approximately 2 weeks after the test and fallout exposure, the 23-member fishing crew began to fall ill with acute radiation sickness, largely brought on by beta burns caused by the direct contact their bare hands had scooping the Bikini snow into bags. Kuboyama Aikichi, the boat's chief radioman, died 7 months later, on September 23, 1954. It was later estimated that about a hundred fishing boats were contaminated to some degree by fallout from the test. Inhabitants of the Marshall Islands were also exposed to fallout, and a number of islands had to be evacuated.

This incident, due to the era of secrecy around nuclear weapons, created widespread fear of uncontrolled and unpredictable nuclear weapons, and also of radioactively contaminated fish affecting the Japanese food supply. With the publication of Joseph Rotblat's findings that the contamination caused by the fallout from the Castle Bravo test was nearly a thousand times greater than that stated officially, outcry in Japan reached such a level that the incident was dubbed by some as "a second Hiroshima". To prevent the subsequent strong anti-nuclear movement from turning into an anti-American movement, the Japanese and U.S. governments agreed on compensation of 2 million dollars for the contaminated fishery, with the surviving 22 crew men receiving about ¥2 million each ($5,556 in 1954, $67,000 in 2025).

The surviving crew members, and their family, would later experience prejudice and discrimination, as local people thought that radiation was contagious.

== In popular culture ==
The Castle Bravo test and the new fears of radioactive fallout inspired a new direction in art and cinema. The Godzilla films, beginning with Ishirō Honda's landmark 1954 film Gojira, are strong metaphors for post-war radiophobia. The opening scene of Gojira echoes the story of the Daigo Fukuryū Maru, from the initial distant flash of light to survivors being found with radiation burns. Although he found the special effects unconvincing, Roger Ebert stated that the film was "an important one" and "properly decoded, was the Fahrenheit 9/11 of its time."

A year after the Castle Bravo test, Akira Kurosawa examined one person's unreasoning terror of radiation and nuclear war in his 1955 film I Live in Fear. At the end of the film, the foundry worker who lives in fear has been declared incompetent by his family, but the possible partial validity of his fears has transferred over to his doctor.

Nevil Shute's 1957 novel On the Beach depicts a future just six years later, based on the premise that a nuclear war has released so much radioactive fallout that all life in the Northern Hemisphere has been killed. The novel is set in Australia, which, along with the rest of the Southern Hemisphere, awaits a similar and inevitable fate. Helen Caldicott describes reading the novel in adolescence as 'a formative event' in her becoming part of the anti-nuclear movement.

== Radiophobia and Chernobyl ==
In the former Soviet Union, many patients with negligible radioactive exposure after the Chernobyl disaster displayed extreme anxiety about low level radiation exposure; they developed many psychosomatic problems, with an increase in fatalistic alcoholism also being observed. As Japanese health and radiation specialist Shunichi Yamashita noted:

We know from Chernobyl that the psychological consequences are enormous. Life expectancy of the evacuees dropped from 65 to 58 years—not [predominately] because of cancer, but because of depression, alcoholism and suicide. Relocation is not easy, the stress is very big. We must not only track those problems, but also treat them. Otherwise people will feel they are just guinea pigs in our research.

The term "radiation phobia syndrome" was introduced in 1987 by L. A. Ilyin and O. A. Pavlovsky in their report "Radiological consequences of the Chernobyl accident in the Soviet Union and measures taken to mitigate their impact".

The author of Chernobyl Poems Lyubov Sirota wrote in her poem "Radiophobia":

Is this only—a fear of radiation?

Perhaps rather—a fear of wars?
Perhaps—the dread of betrayal,

Cowardice, stupidity, lawlessness?

The term has been criticized by Adolph Kharash, Science Director at the Moscow State University:

It treats the normal impulse to self-protection, natural to everything living, your moral suffering, your anguish and your concern about the fate of your children, relatives and friends, and your own physical suffering and sickness as a result of delirium, of pathological perversion.

However, the psychological phobia of radiation in sufferers may not coincide with an actual life-threatening exposure to an individual or their children. Radiophobia refers only to a display of anxiety disproportionate to the actual quantity of radiation one is exposed to, with, in many cases, radiation exposure values equal to, or not much higher than, what individuals are naturally exposed to every day from background radiation. Anxiety following a response to an actual life-threatening level of exposure to radiation is not considered to be radiophobia, nor misplaced anxiety, but a normal, appropriate response.

Marvin Goldman is an American doctor who provided commentary to newspapers claiming that radiophobia had taken a larger toll than the fallout itself had, and that radiophobia was to blame.

=== Chernobyl abortions ===
Following the accident, journalists mistrusted many medical professionals (such as the spokesman from the UK National Radiological Protection Board), and in turn encouraged the public to mistrust them.

Throughout the European continent, in nations where abortion is legal, many requests for induced abortions, of otherwise normal pregnancies, were obtained out of fears of radiation from Chernobyl; including an excess number of abortions of healthy human fetuses in Denmark in the months following the accident.

As the increase in radiation in Denmark was so low that almost no increased risk of birth defects was expected, the public debate and anxiety among the pregnant women and their husbands "caused" more fetal deaths in Denmark than the accident. This underlines the importance of public debate, the role of the mass media and of the way in which National Health authorities participate in this debate.

In Greece, following the accident there was panic and false rumors which led to many obstetricians initially thinking it prudent to interrupt otherwise wanted pregnancies and/or were unable to resist requests from worried pregnant mothers over fears of radiation; within a few weeks misconceptions within the medical profession were largely cleared up, although worries persisted in the general population. Although it was determined that the effective dose would not exceed 1 mSv (0.1 rem), a dose much lower than that which could induce embryonic abnormalities or other non-stochastic effects, there was an observed 2500 excess of otherwise wanted pregnancies being terminated, probably out of fear in the mother of some kind of perceived radiation risk.

A "slightly" above the expected number of induced abortions by request occurred in Italy, where, upon initial request, "a week of reflection" followed by a 2 to 3 week "health system" delay usually occur before the procedure.

== Radiophobia and health effects ==
"My former colleague, William Clark, has likened the public's frenzy over small environmental insults to the fear of witches in the later Middle Ages. Some million certified 'witches' were executed because they could not prove that they had not caused harm to someone or something. In the same way, since one cannot prove that tiny amounts of radiation did not cause a particular leukemia—for that matter one cannot prove that they caused it either—those who wish to succumb to low-level phobia succumb. As a result nuclear energy […is] under siege. Not until the low–level controversy is resolved can we expect nuclear energy to be fully accepted."

— Alvin M. Weinberg

The term "radiophobia" is also sometimes used in the arguments against proponents of the conservative LNT concept (Linear no-threshold response model for ionizing radiation) of radiation security proposed by the U.S. National Council on Radiation Protection and Measurements (NCRP) in 1949. The "no-threshold" position effectively assumes, from data extrapolated from the atomic bombings on Hiroshima and Nagasaki, that even negligible doses of radiation increase one's risk of cancer linearly as the exposure increases from a value of 0 up to high dose rates. The LNT model therefore suggests that radiation exposure from naturally occurring background radiation may be harmful. There is no biological evidence and weak statistical evidence that doses below 100 mSv have any biological effect.

After the Fukushima accident, the German news magazine Der Spiegel reported that Japanese residents were suffering from radiophobia. British medical scientist Geraldine Thomas has also attributed suffering of the Japanese to radiophobia in interviews and formal presentations. Four years after the event The New York Times reported that ″about 1,600 people died from the stress of the evacuation″. The forced evacuation of 154,000 people ″was not justified by the relatively moderate radiation levels″, but was ordered because ″the government basically panicked″. Later analysis has found that the evacuations that took place during the early phases of the accident resulted in 2259 premature deaths, with studies suggesting that the danger of the rapid evacuation was higher than the risk posed by radiation.

At the same time as part of the public fears radiation, some commercial products are also promoted on the basis of their radioactive content, such as "negative ion" bracelets or radon spas.

== Radiophobia and industrial and healthcare use ==
Radiation, most commonly in the form of X-rays, is used frequently in society in order to produce positive outcomes. The primary uses of radiation in healthcare are in radiographic examination and procedures, and radiotherapy in the treatment of cancerous conditions. Radiophobia can be a fear which patients experience before and after either of these procedures; it is therefore the responsibility of the healthcare professional at the time, often a radiographer or radiation therapist, to reassure the patients about the stochastic and deterministic effects of radiation on human physiology. Advising patients and other irradiated persons of the various radiation protection measures that are enforced, including the use of lead-rubber aprons, dosimetry and automatic exposure control is a common method of informing and reassuring radiophobia sufferers.

Similarly, in industrial radiography, there is the possibility of persons experiencing radiophobia when radiophobia sufferers are near industrial radiographic equipment.

== See also ==
- Electromagnetic hypersensitivity
- Atomic Age
- Background radiation
- Backscatter X-ray
- Chernobyl: Consequences of the Catastrophe for People and the Environment
- Dirty bomb
- Electromagnetic radiation and health
- Fear mongering
- Nuclear power debate
