= C14H14N2 =

The molecular formula C_{14}H_{14}N_{2} (molar mass: 210.27 g/mol, exact mass: 210.1157 u) may refer to:

- 3-Amino-9-ethylcarbazole (AEC)
- Naphazoline
