= Protection of the Arctic Marine Environment =

Arctic Council working group

- Abbreviation: PAME
- Formation: 1991
- Type: Working group
- Headquarters: Akureyri, Iceland
- Region served: High Arctic and sub-Arctic regions
- Parent organization: Arctic Council
- Website: www.pame.is

The Protection of the Arctic Marine Environment Working Group (PAME) is one of six working groups encompassed by the Arctic Council. Founded as part of the 1991 Arctic Environmental Protection Strategy, it assimilated into the structure of the Council following the signing of the 1996 Ottawa Declaration by the eight Arctic states. The Working Group claims to operate across the domains of Arctic shipping, maritime pollution, marine protected areas, ecosystem approaches to management, resource exploitation and development, and associations with the marine environment. Where necessary, it is tasked with producing guidelines and recommendations for policy improvement, with projects approved every two years by the council.

The working group includes representatives from each state, (Canada, Denmark (representing both Greenland and the Faroe Islands), Finland, Iceland, Norway, Russia, Sweden, and the United States) as well as its Permanent Participants (Aleut International Association (AAI), Arctic Athabaskan Council (AAC), Gwich'in Council International (GCI), Inuit Circumpolar Council (ICC), Russian Association of Indigenous Peoples of the North (RAIPON), and the Saami Council) representing the region's indigenous populations, and a number of observers. The Secretariat for PAME is located in Akureyri, Iceland.

== Objectives ==
The overarching objectives for PAME were formally outlined in the 2009 meeting held in Oslo, Norway. These objectives are:

- To improve knowledge and respond to emerging knowledge of the Arctic Marine Environment.
- To determine the adequacy of applicable international/regional commitments and promote their implementation and compliance.
- To facilitate partnerships, programme and technical cooperation and support communication, reporting and outreach both within and outside the Arctic Council.

== Arctic Maritime Strategic Plans ==
PAME's objectives, and strategies to further their realisation, are periodically delineated in the group's Arctic Maritime Strategic Plans. As of May 2020, the group has published two such documents; one for the years between 2000 and 2015, and the other for those between 2015 and 2025.

=== Arctic Maritime Strategic Plan 2005–2015 ===
The first of the Working Group's Arctic Maritime Strategic Plans was approved by the Arctic Council in November 2004. The plan centred around:

1. The curtailment and prevention of Arctic marine pollution,
2. The development of sustainable mechanisms for employment of Arctic marine resources,
3. The conservation of marine biodiversity and ecosystems and
4. The 'health and prosperity' of all Arctic inhabitants.

=== Arctic Maritime Strategic Plan 2015–2025 ===
The second Arctic Maritime Strategic Plan delineated four distinct goals relating to Protection of the Arctic Marine Environment for the following 10 years. It was approved by the Council in April 2015 at a meeting in Iqaluit, Canada. The plan called for:

1. The furthering of knowledge relating to the Arctic marine environment and the continuation of the domain's monitoring and assessment structures,
2. The conservation of ecosystem function and encouragement of marine biodiversity,
3. Sustainable employment of the marine environment, centred around cumulative environmental impacts and
4. The enhancement of 'economic, social and cultural well-being of Arctic inhabitants', including the Arctic's indigenous population and the strengthening of their capacity to adapt to ongoing changes in the Arctic marine environment.

The second Arctic Maritime Strategic Plan was accompanied by two plans to strengthen its progress: the Implementation Plan and Communication Plan. The former was intended to provide the Arctic Council with an increasingly structured approach to achieving the Working Group's goals, as well as providing guidelines against which progress could be appraised. The latter aimed to facilitate communication and understanding to ensure the fulfilment of the working group's goals.

== Cooperation ==
PAME works in partnership with The Arctic Council's five additional working groups to construct its strategic plans and suggest mechanisms for their implementation. The five additional working groups of the Arctic Council are:

1. Arctic Monitoring and Assessment Programme (AMAP)
2. Conservation of Arctic Flora & Fauna (CAFF)
3. Emergency Prevention, Preparedness & Response (EPPR)
4. Sustainable Development Working Group (SDWG)
5. Arctic Contaminants Action Program (ACAP)

== Projects ==
=== Arctic Marine Shipping Assessment ===
In 2009, the working group released a major report on Arctic marine shipping, the Arctic Marine Shipping Assessment, which analyses current and predicted trends in Arctic transport. PAME was tasked to conduct this research after the 2004 Arctic Climate Impact Assessment concluded that Arctic sea ice decline "is very likely to increase marine transport and access to resources". PAME identifies increases in marine tourism and in transport supporting the exploration and extraction of marine resources as potential catalysts of environmental degradation.

=== Maritime pollution ===
A key role of PAME relates itself to the proliferation of Arctic maritime contamination and pollution, stemming from both off-shore and on-shore activities. As of May 2020, PAME is the process of developing a regional action plan on marine litter in the Arctic, as an extension of a preliminary study on Arctic marine litter and micro-plastics which was carried out between 2017 and 2019.

The group's focus on Arctic maritime pollution can be identified in its 1998 Regional Programme of Action for the Protection of the Arctic Marine Environment from Land-based Activities (Arctic RPA), updated in 2009 to reflect contemporary challenges in preventing Arctic marine pollution.

=== Marine protected areas ===
The expert group of PAME's Marine Protected Areas subdivision is co-led by Canada, Norway and the United States.

PAME adheres to the definition of a 'Marine Protected Area' volunteered by the International Union for Conservation of Nature. The definition focuses the existence of a distinct geographical area managed in such a way that ensures the long-term conservation and protection of its natural ecosystems. There are seven categories to accommodate the various characters of protected areas that exist globally, with the Arctic states each possessing policy tools to designate and manage these.

=== Ecosystem approaches to management ===
Between 2006 and 2017, PAME produced a total of 11 ecosystem approaches to management (EA) progress reports, and has developed a framework for application of the approach to its projects. The framework principles involve identifying the character of local ecosystems before considering them adjacent to the group's assessments, objectives and values. Decisions with respect to the management of local human activity are made based on the outcomes of these processes.

The establishment of the expert group on Arctic ecosystem-based management (EBM) occurred in 2011, the centrality to the working of the Council of which was furthered in both 2015 and 2017, with council ministers agreeing on the requirement for distinct guidelines for implementing the Ecosystem Approach in the Arctic region.

PAME and the Arctic Council define ecosystem approaches to management as the management of human activities based on contemporary, scientific knowledge of local ecosystems. The purpose of the approach is to facilitate management decisions of human activity which balance the exploitation of marine resources with ecosystem prosperity.

=== Marine resource exploitation and development ===
In 2009, PAME released guidelines for the exploitation of Arctic off-shore gas and oil, delineating the Arctic Council's understanding of "good practice" for the stages of planning, exploring, developing, producing and decommissioning areas and equipment employed in resource exploitation and development.

Since the commissioning of these guidelines, PAME has published eight developing documents detailing further development of local regulation on Arctic oil and Gas drilling activities.

== PAME meetings ==
PAME convenes on an annual, or biannual basis, and meets with the Ministers of the Arctic Council once every two years. The location of PAME meetings alternates between cities situated in the 8 Arctic states.

Past meetings by month, year and location

Month/year	Location
November 1999	Akureyri, Iceland
June 2000	Copenhagen, Denmark
January 2001	Washington, D.C., United States
October 2001	Moscow, Russia
April 2002	Reykjavík, Iceland
February 2003	Stockholm, Sweden
February 2004	Helsinki, Finland
May 2004	Reykjavík, Iceland
February 2005	Copenhagen, Denmark
September 2005	Aalborg, Denmark
March 2006	Oslo, Norway
August 2006	Murmansk, Russia
March 2007	Copenhagen, Denmark
September 2007	Reykjavík, Iceland
June 2008	St John's, Canada
October 2008	Helsinki, Finland
October 2009	Oslo, Norway
March 2010	Copenhagen, Denmark
September 2010	Washington, D.C., United States
February 2011	Oslo, Norway
September 2011	Reykjavík, Iceland
March 2012	Stockholm, Sweden
September 2012	Halifax, Canada
February 2013	Rovaniemi, Finland
September 2013	Rostov-on-Don, Russia
February 2014	Girdwood, Anchorage, Alaska, United States
September 2014	Whitehorse, Canada
February 2015	Akureyri, Iceland
September 2015	Tromsø, Norway
February 2016	Stockholm, Sweden
September 2016	Portland, United States
January 2017	Copenhagen, Denmark
September 2017	Helsinki, Finland
February 2018	Quebec City, Canada
October 2018	Vladivostok, Russia
February 2019	Malmö, Sweden
September 2019	Reykjavík, Iceland
February 2020	Oslo, Norway

== See also ==
- International Arctic Science Committee
- United Nations Environment Programme
- Ilulissat Declaration
- Arctic cooperation and politics
