= Energy Commission =

Energy Commission may refer to:

- Energy Commission (Ghana)
- Energy Commission (Malaysia)

== See also ==
- Atomic Energy Commission
