= Anger Engineering Company =

Defunct automobile company in Wisconsin

The Anger Engineering Company (or A.E.C.) was an automobile company from Milwaukee, Wisconsin from 1913-1915.

== History ==
The A.E.C. company was founded in April 1912 by a man named Walter A. Anger. He was described as "a well-known auto tradesman". He had either T-head or L-head engines with either four or six cylinders. Most cars were built custom. In 1915, the company went under.

=== Models ===
Model	Engine	HP	Wheelbase
4-40	251.3CID 4-cylinder	26	120"
6-50	6-cylinder	38	134"
6-60	6-cylinder	43	140"
