= Automatic exposure control =

Termination device in X-ray radiography

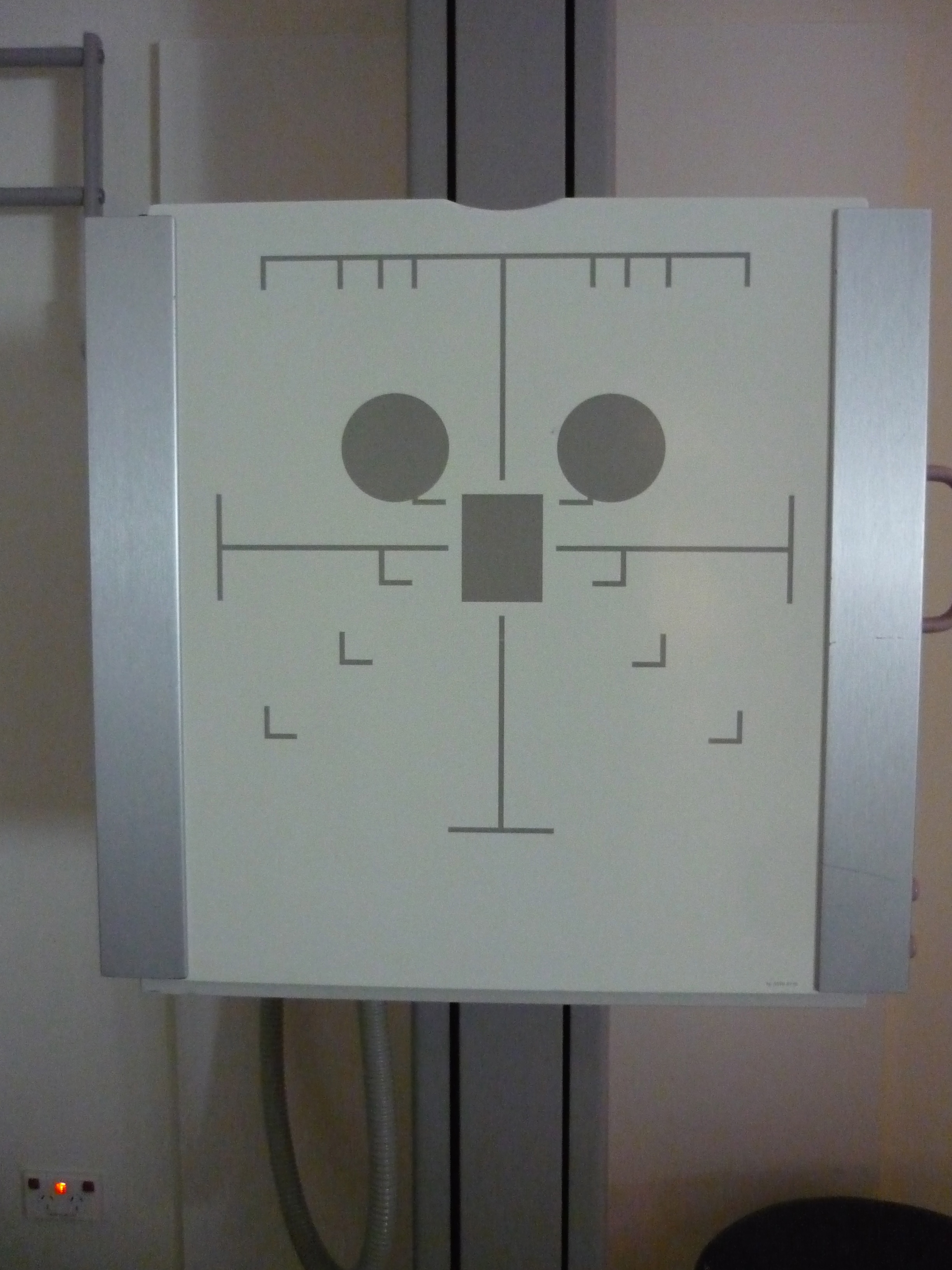
An x-ray image receptor, containing an anti-scatter grid and three AEC regions (represented by dark grey circles and square) These regions represent anatomical areas, e.g. lungs, spine. They can be selected individually, or all at once depending on the need.

Automatic Exposure Control (AEC) is an X-ray exposure termination device. A medical radiographic exposure is always initiated by a human operator but an AEC detector system may be used to terminate the exposure when a predetermined amount of radiation has been received. The intention of AEC is to provide consistent X-ray image exposure, whether to film, a digital detector or a CT scanner. AEC systems may also automatically set exposure factors such as the X-ray tube current and voltage in a CT.

== Operation ==
=== Projectional radiography ===
In projectional radiography, an AEC system uses one or more physically thin radiation ionization chambers (the "AEC detector") positioned between the X-ray source and X-ray receptor. Where low energy X-rays are used, such as in mammography, the AEC detector is placed behind the image receptor to avoid creating a shadow.

In early radiographic AEC systems, a large paddle (17" x 17") of transparent Lucite was sandwiched between rare earth screens, which emitted photons when excited by X-rays. The individual Lucite sections were open on one end, and a solenoid was used to select one of three, or a combination of shutters that allowed the generated light into a photomultiplier tube (PMT). The output of the PMT was then converted to a signal, which ramped in the positive direction until a preprogrammed threshold was reached. At this point, the X-ray generator terminated the exposure. This method is no longer used, and has been replaced by the iontomat. In an iontomat, a weak ionization signal resulting from the radiographic X-rays passing through it are integrated as a ramp shaped voltage waveform. This ramp signal rises until it matches a pre-set threshold. At this point the X-ray exposure is terminated by the X-ray generator. AEC devices are calibrated to ensure that similar exams have linearity in optical density.

=== Computed tomography ===
Modern computed tomography (CT) scanners have AEC systems which aim to maintain image quality for patients of varying sizes, whilst keeping doses as low as reasonably practicable. The systems are also designed to maintain quality with the varying size and attenuation of an individual patient over their length. Implementations vary between manufacturers; some systems are based on a desired noise level in the image, while others are based on a specified reference output (milliampere second, mAs).

CT AEC systems use the initial "scanogram", a fixed angle planning view, to determine the relative size of the patient, and variation over their length. The tube output is then adjusted for overall size. The output is also typically modulated for each rotation in response to changes in attenuation over patient length. Some systems adjust output during each rotation, which is known as rotational modulation, based on measured attenuation in the previous rotation.

== Advantages ==
Because patients vary in size and shape, an AEC device is very useful in achieving consistent X-ray film densities, which can be difficult when manually setting exposure factors without AEC.

== Disadvantages ==
AEC devices are susceptible to operator error (usually due to mispositioned anatomy or having the incorrect AEC chamber selected). Prosthetic devices such as total hip hardware can also cause the selected ionization chamber to overexpose the image receptor. This is due to the absorption of the X-ray beam into the metal of the hardware as opposed to exposing the ionization chamber.
