= 3-Amino-9-ethylcarbazole =

Names
- Preferred IUPAC name 9-Ethyl-9H-carbazol-3-amine
- Other names AEC; 9-Ethylcarbazol-3-amine

Identifiers
CAS Number	132-32-1
3D model (JSmol)	Interactive image
ChEBI	CHEBI:122149
ChEMBL	ChEMBL327035
ChemSpider	8269
ECHA InfoCard	100.004.599
EC Number	205-057-7
MeSH	3-amino-9-ethylcarbazole
PubChem CID	8588
UNII	8Q2BG27JBU
UN number	2811
CompTox Dashboard (EPA)	DTXSID1030319
- InChI: InChI=1S/C14H14N2/c1-2-16-13-6-4-3-5-11(13)12-9-10(15)7-8-14(12)16/h3-9H,2,15H2,1H3 Key: OXEUETBFKVCRNP-UHFFFAOYSA-N
- SMILES: CCN1C2=C(C=C(C=C2)N)C3=CC=CC=C31

Properties
Chemical formula	C_{14}H_{14}N_{2}
Molar mass	210.280 g·mol^{−1}

Hazards
- Occupational safety and health (OHS/OSH)
Main hazards	Acutely toxic, Health hazards
- GHS labelling
Pictograms	(GHS08: Health hazard)
Signal word	Danger
Hazard statements	H350
Precautionary statements	P201, P202, P281, P308+P313, P405, P501
- Except where otherwise noted, data are given for materials in their standard state (at 25 °C [77 °F], 100 kPa). (what is ?) Infobox references

3-Amino-9-ethylcarbazole (AEC) is a chemical compound commonly used as a chromogenic substrate in immunohistochemistry, specifically for visualizing sections stained with HRP-conjugated secondary antibodies. After the chromogenic oxidation reaction catalyzed by HRP, a red water-insoluble precipitate is formed in situ, visualizing the location of the antigen detected by the HRP-conjugated antibody. The resulting stained section can be destained by organic solvents in which the red precipitate is soluble.
