= Atomic Energy Commission =

Many countries have or have had an Atomic Energy Commission. These include:

- National Atomic Energy Commission, Argentina (1950–present)
- Australian Atomic Energy Commission (1952–1987)
- Bangladesh Atomic Energy Commission (1973–present)
- Commissariat à l'énergie atomique et aux énergies alternatives, France (1945–present)
- Atomic Energy Commission of India (1948–present)
- Japanese Atomic Energy Commission (原子力委員会) (1955–present)
- Pakistan Atomic Energy Commission (1956–present)
- United Nations Atomic Energy Commission, UNAEC (1946–1948)
- United States Atomic Energy Commission (1946–1975)

== See also ==
- Energy Commission
- Nuclear Safety Commission (Taiwan) (2023–present)
- United Kingdom Atomic Energy Authority (1954–present)
