= United Nations Declaration on the Rights of Indigenous Peoples Act (Canada) =

Canadian federal legislation

Parliament of Canada
- Long title: An Act respecting the United Nations Declaration on the Rights of Indigenous Peoples
- Citation: S.C. 2021, c. 14
- Passed by: House of Commons
- Passed: May 25, 2021
- Passed by: Senate
- Passed: June 16, 2021
- Royal assent: June 21, 2021
- Commenced: June 21, 2021

Legislative history

Initiating chamber: House of Commons
- Bill title: Bill C-15
- Introduced by: David Lametti, Minister of Justice
- First reading: December 3, 2020
- Second reading: April 19, 2021
- Third reading: May 25, 2021

Revising chamber: Senate
- Bill title: Bill C-15
- First reading: May 25, 2021
- Second reading: June 3, 2021
- Third reading: June 16, 2021
- Status: In force

The United Nations Declaration on the Rights of Indigenous Peoples Act (Note: Full title: An Act respecting the United Nations Declaration on the Rights of Indigenous Peoples) (French: Loi sur la Déclaration des Nations Unies sur les droits des peuples autochtones, also known as UNDA or formerly Bill C-15) is a law enacted by the Parliament of Canada and introduced during the second session of the 43rd Canadian Parliament in 2020. The legislation establishes a legal framework and timeline to bring Canadian law into alignment with the United Nations' Declaration on the Rights of Indigenous Peoples (UNDRIP).

The law requires the federal government to ensure Canadian law is consistent with the declaration's 46 articles, working with First Nations, Métis, and Inuit peoples. A key element is requiring free, prior and informed consent (FPIC) with the Indigenous peoples. It also requires an action plan within two years of its passage to achieve the declaration's objectives, and an annual report on progress made. Two years later, in 2023, the action plan was published by the Government of Canada.

The legislation is part of the government's response to a recommendation from the Truth and Reconciliation Commission (TRC) to adopt and implement UNDRIP as the framework for reconciliation. It also responds to the National Inquiry into Missing and Murdered Indigenous Women and Girls (MMIWG).

Then Assembly of First Nations Chief Perry Bellegarde noted that, while the bill at the time was not perfect, he welcomed and supported the legislation.

When introduced as a bill, it had the support of 37 Indigenous Nations and governments and other organizations, and 125 human rights advocates.

== Action Plan ==
On June 21, 2023, exactly two years after the act came into force, the Action Plan was released and available on the Government of Canada's website.

The draft plan received a "chilly reception" at a meeting of the Assembly of First Nations.

== History ==
=== Canada and the declaration ===
Canada led efforts to weaken the draft declaration in 2002 and 2003, alongside Australia, New Zealand and the United States, though this was only revealed in 2024.

The UN resolution was passed in 2007. Four countries voted against the resolution: Australia, New Zealand and the United States. Twelve countries voted against and 143 countries voted in favour of the resolution.

UNDRIP was passed by the UN General Assembly in 2007, with Canada voting against it under a Conservative government. In November 2010, the Conservative government publicly reversed its position, asserting its support for the declaration as an "aspirational document". In May 2016, Crown-Indigenous Relations Minister Carolyn Bennett officially removed Canada's objector status to UNDRIP at the United Nations.

=== Roméo Saganash's failed Bill C-262 ===
Bill C-262 was introduced on April 21, 2016 as a private member's bill by NDP MP Roméo Saganash to implement the UN's resolution. Although Prime Minister Trudeau had campaigned in 2015 on the promise to implement the declaration, the Liberal government was not initially supportive, publicly declaring its implementation into Canadian law as "unworkable." In November 2016, however, the government reversed this position, endorsing Bill-262. Nevertheless, Bill C-262 "died on the order paper" in the senate during a Conservative filibuster. Maclean's referred to Saganash as the declaration's first "parliamentary champion".

=== Bill C-15 ===
In December 2019, the Liberal Party of Canada's throne speech following the 2019 federal election promised to implement UNDRIP within a year of its new mandate. The tabling of the bill was postponed in early 2020 due to the rail blockade crisis.

On December 3, 2020, Minister of Justice David Lametti introduced the bill to the House of Commons where it passed its first reading. It used the former Bill C-262 as a starting point, adding new language, provisions, and a purpose clause in collaboration with Assembly of First Nations, Inuit Tapiriit Kanatami and the Métis National Council.

On February 17, 2021 Minister of Justice David Lametti moved that the bill be read the second time at the House of Commons and referred to parliamentary committee. By April 19, the house voted in favour of a second reading and be referred to committee.

On March 9, 2021 an open letter by the Grand Council of the Crees (Eeyou Istchee) in support of the bill was published in The Hill Times, urging its passage into law before parliament's session concludes. The letter's full list of signatories comprises 37 Indigenous Nations, governments, and other organizations, as well as 125 human rights advocates.

On March 11, 2021 the Standing Committee on Indigenous and Northern Affairs (INAN) held its first meeting on the bill. Witnesses included former NDP MP Romeo Saganash, the author of the bill's predecessor, C-262.

On April 26, 2021 the INAN produced its committee report studying the bill with amendments. The adjustments included references to systemic racism, that doctrines of discovery and terra nullius are racist, and shortened the time limit for the action plan from three years to two.

On June 10, 2021 the Standing Senate Committee on Aboriginal Peoples, after the bill passed its first and second readings in the senate, released its report without any amendments but with observations. The senate passed the bill's third reading on June 16, 2021 without any amendment and received Royal Assent on June 21.

== Provisions ==
The bill is the "first step" in aligning Canadian law with the declaration.

== Reception ==
=== Praise ===
The bill was heavily praised by the Cree Nation government, who described it as key to reconciliation. The bill was supported by other First Nation governments across Canada.

The United Nations Special Rapporteur on the rights of Indigenous Peoples, Pedro Arrojo-Agudo, described the legislation as "a benchmark for international leadership".

=== Criticism ===
The bill was significantly criticized by several First Nation governments in Alberta, as well as conservative governments across Canada.

Although the act requires Free Prior and Informed Consent, it does not explicitly provide a definition. This caused concern from various groups, including politicians and Indigenous leaders. Without a clear definition, some feared it would allow individuals to veto developments that are in the national interest and others feared that without a veto it is not true consent. The bill was criticized by Wendy Lynn Lerat, who taught Indigenous Studies at First Nations University of Canada, in an opinion piece for CBC, describing it as "smoke and mirrors" for decolonisation.

Idle No More, an Indigenous rights organization, along with two other Indigenous groups rejected the bill C-15 outright, asserting it is an attack on Indigenous sovereignty and self-determination. Russ Diabo, a former advisor to two national chiefs at the Assembly of First Nations, described the bill as, "the Prime Minister [...] attempting his own version of the White Paper". Diabo criticized the bill's lack of Indigenous consultation, claiming it uses language designed to mislead Indigenous people, and that the, "UN declaration will be interpreted and implemented through the colonial Canadian constitutional framework, instead of respecting international law regarding the rights of Indigenous Peoples".

== Further developments ==
The Royal Bank of Canada was the world's leading "fossil fuel funder" in 2022. Proposals to set absolute emissions targets for 2030, restrict financing for projects relating to fossil fuel expansion and align with the declaration were rejected by shareholders in 2023.

=== Australia ===
The Joint Standing Committee on Aboriginal and Torres Strait Islander Affairs recommended the federal government implement the declaration. Senator Lidia Thorpe introduced a private member's bill with similar provisions to the Canadian UNDRIP Act.

== See also ==
- CARE Principles for Indigenous Data Governance
- Declaration on the Rights of Indigenous Peoples Act (British Columbia)
