= Circumpolar peoples =

Term for Indigenous peoples of the Arctic

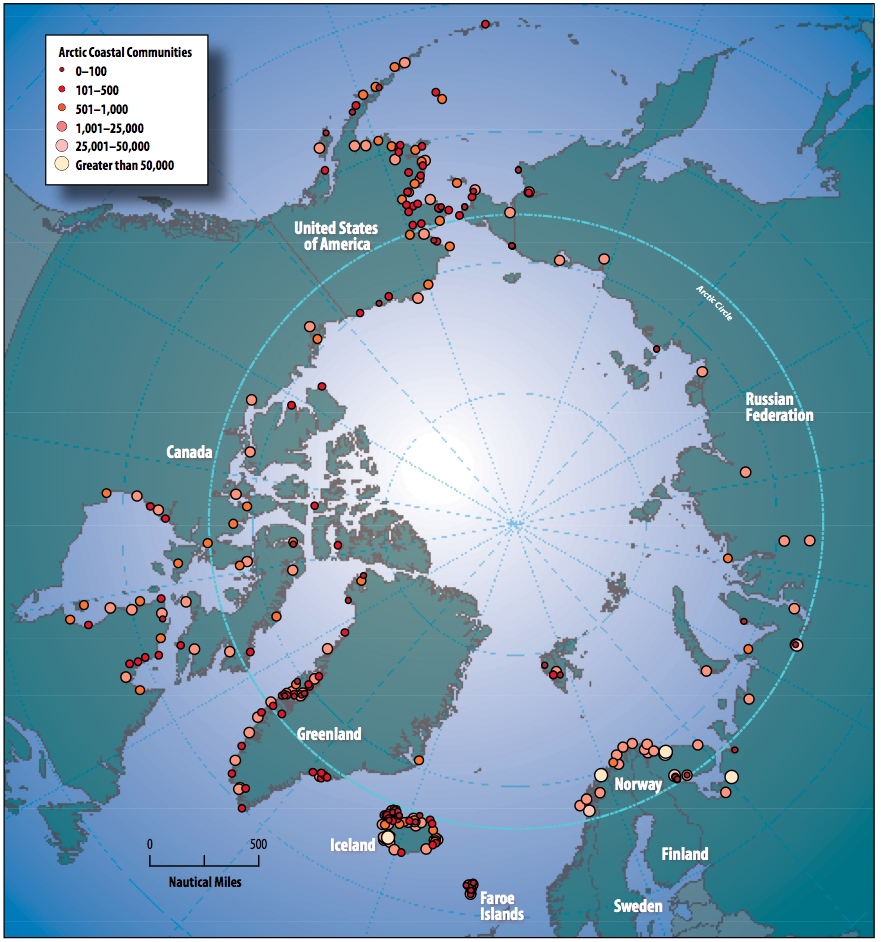
Circumpolar coastal human population distribution ca. 2009 (includes both Indigenous and non-Indigenous)

Circumpolar peoples and Arctic peoples are umbrella terms for the various Indigenous peoples living around the North Pole.

Approximately four million people are resident in the Arctic, among whom 10 percent are Indigenous peoples belonging to a vast number of distinct communities. They represent a minority everywhere except Greenland, where 90 percent of the population is Inuit.

It is difficult to find an exact number for the Indigenous peoples in the Arctic as states have a tendency to downplay the numbers. Moreover, each state has its own different methods to count its Indigenous population. For instance, Russia excludes from the official status of "small peoples of the North" (Russian: "малые народы Севера" (malye narody Severa) or "Коренные малочисленные народы Севера" (Korennye malochislennye narody Severa)) every community that exceeds 50,000 people. They are therefore excluding from the definition certain numerically large Indigenous communities like the Komi peoples, Karelians and Yakuts.

== Definition and extent ==
The term circumpolar peoples denotes the indigenous populations of the land and sea around the North Pole. The region has no single agreed boundary, since climate, vegetation, fauna, permafrost and the sparseness of settlement each yield a different limit. In the broadest delimitation it takes in Alaska, the northern Canadian territories and provinces with the Labrador Peninsula and Newfoundland, Greenland, northern Fennoscandia, northern Russia and northern Siberia as far as Kamchatka.

The area is conventionally divided into the Arctic and the Subarctic. The Arctic carries only tundra vegetation, while the Subarctic corresponds to the boreal forest belt, and the tree line separating them works as both an ecological and a cultural boundary. On estimates drawn from the 1970s the region covered some 41 million square kilometres, about eight per cent of the globe, and held an aboriginal population of roughly 600,000 to 800,000 in seventy to eighty ethnic groups. Peoples sharing a language did not thereby form a political or national body but identified with their local community, so that linguistic kinship and cultural likeness do not run together.

Sustained contact with Europeans came at different dates in different regions. Russian settlement reached Siberia in the 17th century, the indigenous peoples of north-western Canada dealt with European traders from about the turn of the 18th century, and the Inuit entered continuous contact during the 18th century, in some territories not until the 19th.

== History ==
=== Prehistory ===
The earliest inhabitants of North America's central and eastern Arctic are referred to as the Arctic small tool tradition (AST) and existed c. 2500 BCE. The AST consisted of several Paleo-Eskimo cultures, including the Independence cultures and Pre-Dorset culture. The Dorset culture (Inuktitut: Tuniit or Tunit) refers to the next inhabitants of central and eastern Arctic. The Dorset culture evolved because of technological and economic changes during the period of 1050–550 BCE. With the exception of the Quebec / Labrador Peninsula, the Dorset culture vanished around 1500 CE.

Dorset / Thule culture transition dates around the 9th–10th centuries. Scientists theorize that there may have been cross-contact of the two cultures with sharing of technology, such as fashioning harpoon heads, or the Thule may have found Dorset remnants and adapted their ways with the predecessor culture. Others believe the Thule displaced the Dorset.

== Social organization ==
Circumpolar societies lived by hunting, fishing and gathering or by reindeer herding, and a single dwelling place could not meet their needs through the year. Communities therefore shifted their settlements in step with the seasonal cycles of the resources they depended on, moving along a network of sites that together supplied a year's subsistence. These movements were not improvised but followed knowledge passed down between generations.

Their social order followed the seasonal alternation of gathering and dispersal, the larger gatherings carrying the year's principal religious and marriage ceremonies and reinforcing a shared identity. Working in the North American Arctic and Subarctic, anthropologists distinguished several community levels by size and structure, from the household through the household group, local band and regional band to the area population, alongside the activity or task group formed for a particular undertaking.

The household, often spanning several generations and numbering around fifteen people, stayed together through the year and formed the basic unit. A local band of roughly ten households, some hundred people, held a subsistence and settlement region, while the larger regional band of a hundred to a thousand assembled briefly once a year and supplied, through marriage and kinship, the pool from which local bands drew their spouses. The largest unit, the area population of peoples sharing a culturally defined territory, corresponds to what ethnographers call a tribe or a people. A task group, such as the boat crew of about nine men among the coastal Chukchi, Koryak and Yupik, gathered the hunting-aged men of several households for a specific activity.

In Eurasia the local band appears to have been the largest community with which people identified, taking its name from a leader, a leading family or a place, and a leader was respected and heeded without necessarily holding power. These communities were fluid: individuals and families could join or leave, generally moving to a band where they already had kin, though a core group tended to remain in the same area across generations. Their openness may have increased as epidemics introduced by Europeans reduced populations. Later, Scandinavian and Russian administrations reshaped village organization, the Russian state appointing elders to collect taxes among Siberian and Alaskan peoples.

== Political organization ==
=== Arctic Council ===
The voice of Indigenous people in the Arctic is important as they have usually been seen as the representatives and voices of the impact of climate change in the Arctic. Some numerically large Indigenous communities hold a role in the geopolitics of the Arctic region through the status of permanent participant in the Arctic Council. This is the case for the Aleuts through the Aleut International Association, the Canadian and Alaskan Athabaskans through the Arctic Athabaskan Council, the Gwichʼin through the Gwich'in Council International, the Inuit through the Inuit Circumpolar Council, the Sámi through the Saami Council and the Indigenous peoples of the Russian north through Russian Association of Indigenous Peoples of the North (RAIPON). Generally, when Indigenous peoples participate in international discussion, they have the status of non-governmental organizations (NGOs), in order to differentiate them from states. However, the Arctic Council established a unique model of Indigenous participation by giving them the status of Permanent Participants.

It is a new reading of their participation and consultative right granted by the United Nation Declaration on the Rights of Indigenous People in its article 18. Indigenous people are, for once, seated at the same table as states' representatives. This enables them to gain influence on the soft law making process, which was until now for states only. They are also starting to gain influence in the making of legally binding texts, as they participated in the making of the Arctic Search and Rescue (May 2011) and the Agreement on Cooperation on Marine Oil Pollution Preparedness and Response in the Arctic (2013). Certain areas still remain purely under state control, as the Arctic Council's aim is to focus on sustainable development and environmental protection in the Arctic region, excluding de facto other topics like security and border disputes. Circumpolar peoples do not have access to or have only limited access to these types of discussions which concern their land but are discussed elsewhere.

=== Political aims ===
In 2023, the Statement of the Arctic Peoples’ Conference 2023 – Inuiaat Issittormiut Ataatsimeersuarnerat 2023 was issued on the common circumpolar peoples' political goals for the 50th anniversary of the first Circumpolar Meeting of Arctic Indigenous Peoples. One of the main arguments is the defense of their right to well being.

A major preoccupation is the access to healthcare and the application of mental health policies as suicide, especially among the younger generations, is a major issue that threatens the future of these communities. They also call for climate justice and denounce green colonialism which is the land encroachment, resource extraction and renewable energy production on their land, without their consent as well as the proliferation of marine protected areas that are not Indigenous-led. They recall their right to determine their own priorities for development, which should be understood as not confined to economic development. Finally, they highlight the need to ask for their consensus before making any decision in the Arctic Council and that making decisions without consensus undermines its purpose and integrity.

=== Possible future discussions ===
With the melting of the ice and the possibility of opening new trade routes as well as extracting resources from the seabed, resource management could be a major topic of discussion between Arctic States and Circumpolar Peoples. According to international law and Indigenous rights, resource management should fall into a regime of co-management between the states and the Indigenous communities present in the territory where the resources are extracted. Moreover, the law states that Indigenous peoples have to be part of "strategic planning", in other words in defining the various deadlines of such projects. They should also receive "fair and equitable benefit sharing". A revenue sharing scheme would improve Arctic Indigenous peoples' living standards and enable them to gain further economic autonomy. Finally, following the United Nations Declaration of the Rights of Indigenous People, circumpolar peoples are aiming to have more political representation and consultation at all levels: national, regional and international.

== List of peoples by ethnolinguistic grouping ==
By 1300, the Inuit, present-day Arctic inhabitants and descendants of Thule culture, had settled in west Greenland, and moved into east Greenland over the following century. Over time, the Inuit, and other related peoples, have migrated throughout the Arctic and subarctic regions of Canada (Inuit Nunangat), Greenland, Russia (Siberia), and the United States (Alaska).

Other Indigenous peoples of the circumpolar north include the Chukchi, Evenks, Iñupiat, Khanty, Koryaks, Nenets, Sámi, Yukaghir, and Yupik. Yupik people still refer to themselves as Eskimo which means "snowshoe netters", not "raw meat eaters" as it is sometimes mistakenly translated.

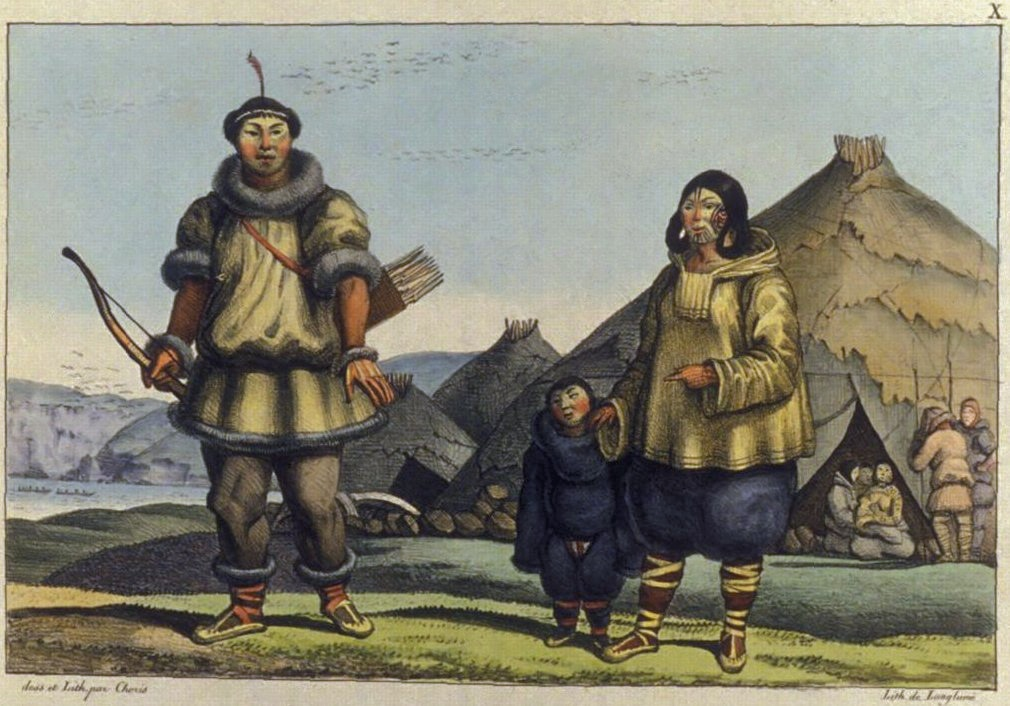
Chukchi, one of many Indigenous peoples of Siberia. Representation of a Chukchi family by Louis Choris (1816)

- Ancient Beringian – Siberia and Alaska
- Chukotko-Kamchatkan
  - Chukchi, Siberia (Chukotka Autonomous Okrug), Russia
  - Koryaks, Siberia (Kamchatka Krai), Russia
- Tungusic
  - Evenks, China (Inner Mongolia and Heilongjiang), Mongolia, Russia
  - Evens, Siberia (Magadan Oblast, Kamchatka Krai and Sakha), Russia
- Turkic
  - Northeast Turkic
    - Dolgans, Siberia (Krasnoyarsk Krai), Russia
    - Yakuts, Siberia (Sakha), Russia
- Eskaleut
  - Eskimo
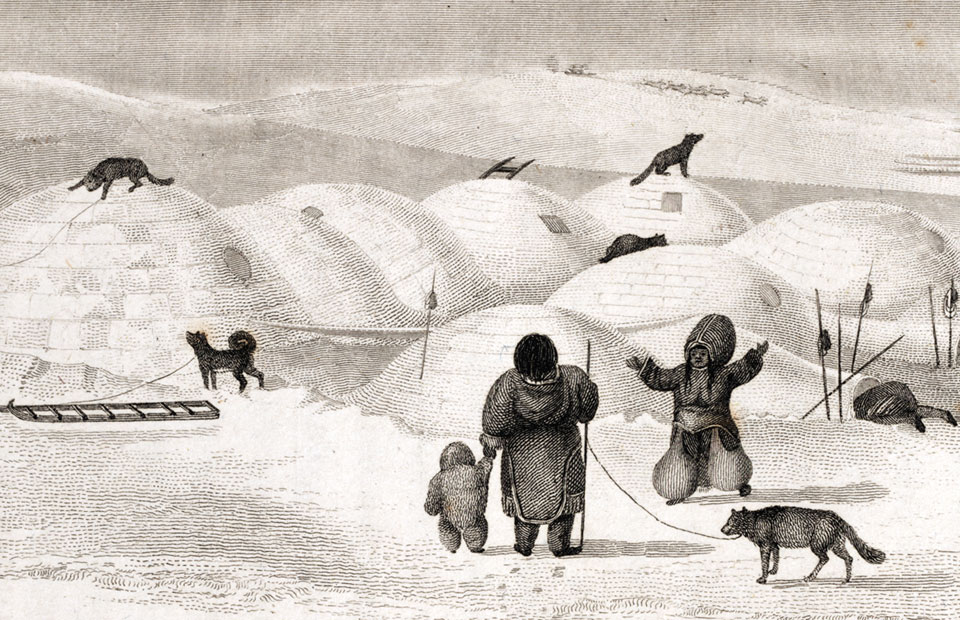
    A group of igloos forming an Inuit village, 1824, by George Francis Lyon
    - Yupik: Alaska and the Russian Far East (Chukotka Autonomous Okrug)
      - Alutiiq, Alaska
      - Yup'ik, Alaska
        - Cup'ik, Alaska
        - Cup'ig, Nunivak Island (Alaska)
      - Siberian Yupik, Siberia (Chukotka Autonomous Okrug), Russia
    - Inuit: Greenland, Northern Canada (Nunavut, Nunavik, Nunatsiavut, Northwest Territories (Inuvialuit Nunangit) and Yukon), Alaska, United States
      - Kalaallit, Greenland
      - Iñupiat: Northwest Arctic and North Slope boroughs and the Bering Straits, Alaska, United States
  - Aleuts: Aleutian Islands, Alaska, United States and Kamchatka Krai, Russia
- Uralic
  - Finno-Ugric
    - Permians
      - Komi, Russia (Komi Republic and Perm Krai)
      - Udmurts, Russia
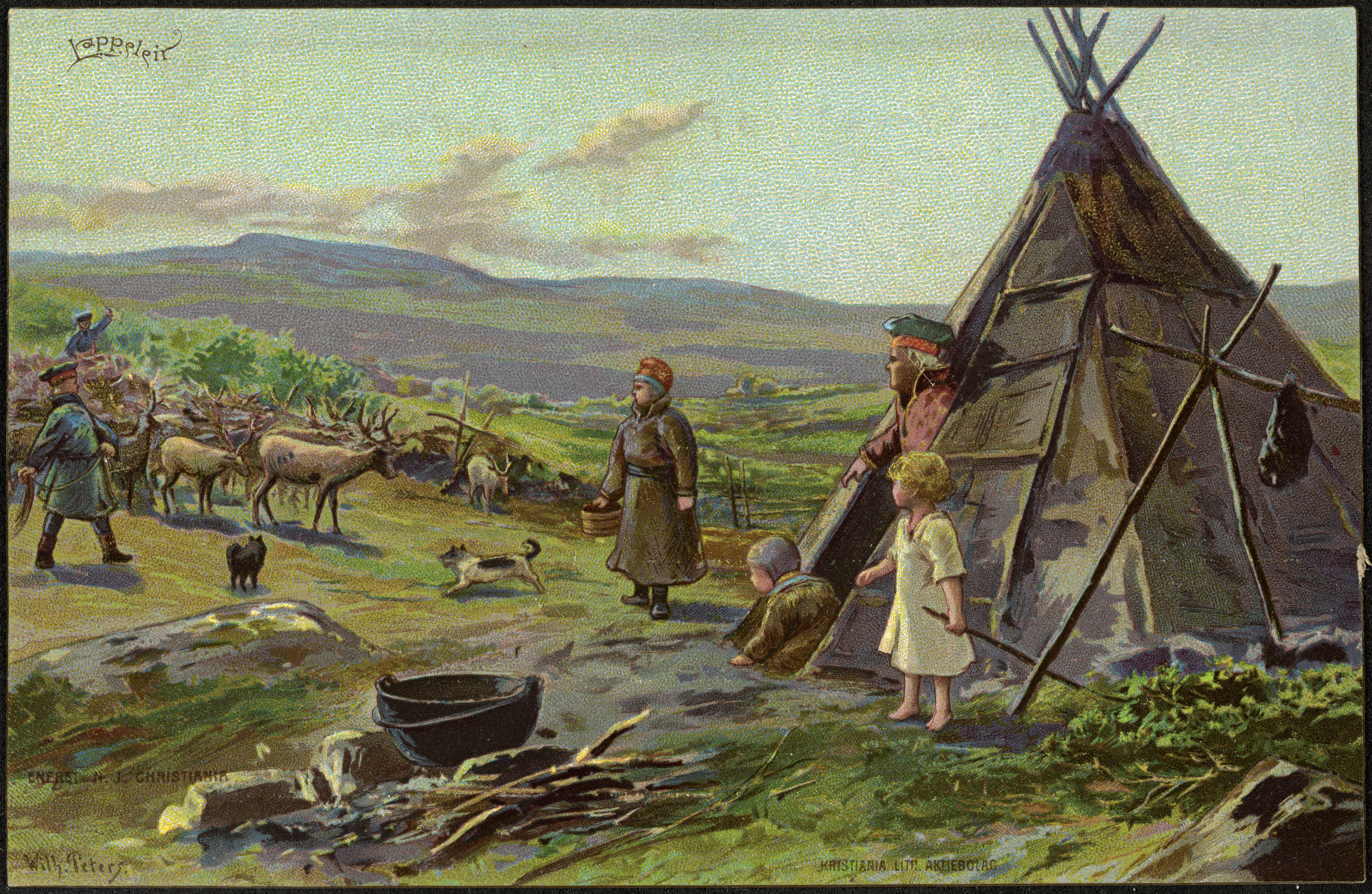
        Sami people in Norway, c. 1900, painted by Wilhelm Peters
    - Sámi: Northern Norway, Sweden, Finland, Russia (Murmansk Oblast)
    - Balto-Finnic
      - Finns
      - Karelians, Finland, Russia
  - Samoyedic
    - Nenets, Russia
    - Enets, Siberia (Krasnoyarsk Krai), Russia
    - Nganasan, Siberia (Krasnoyarsk Krai), Russia
    - Selkup, Siberia, Russia
- Yukaghirs, East Siberia, Russia
- Indo-European
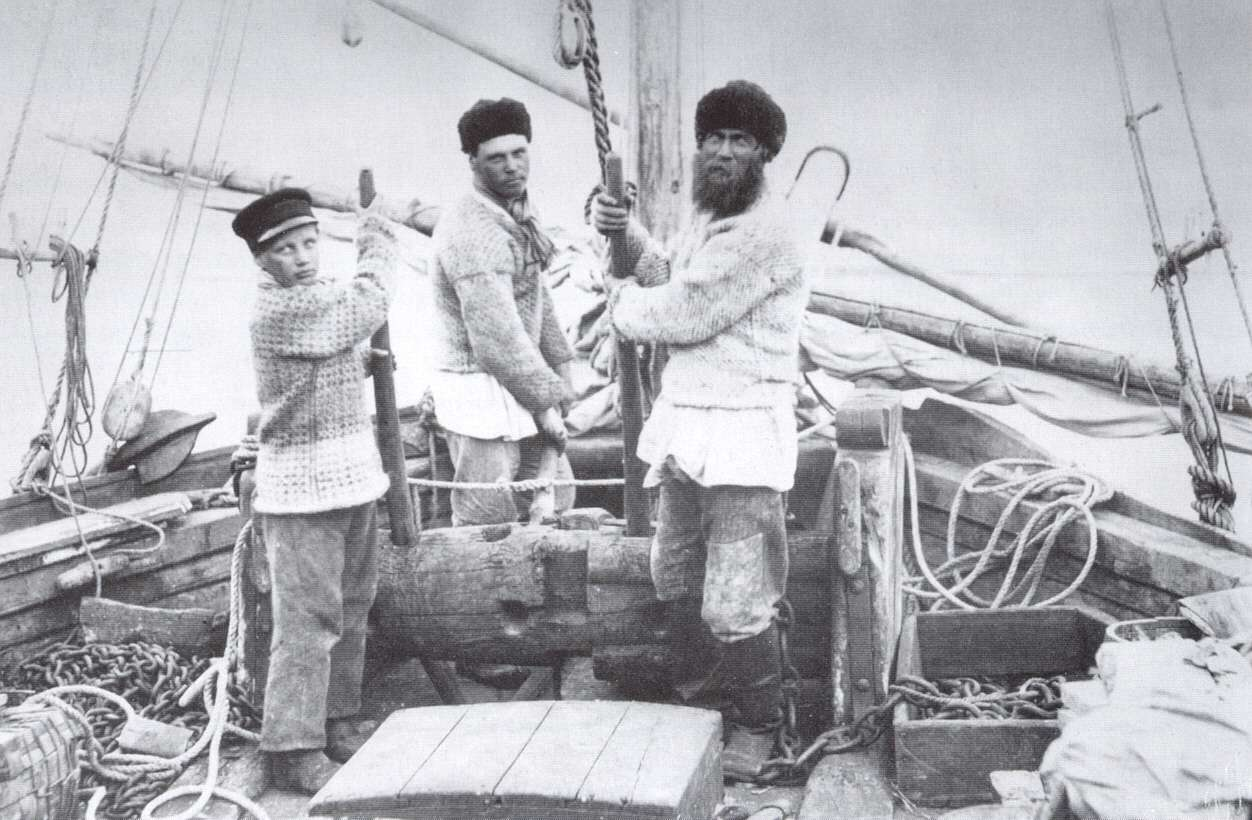
  Russia's Arctic coastline from the White Sea to the Bering Strait had been explored and settled by Pomors, Russian settlers from Novgorod.
  - Slavs
    - East Slavic
      - Pomors and other Russians, Russia
  - Germanic peoples
    - North Germanic peoples
      - Icelanders
      - Norwegians
      - Swedes

== See also ==
- Indigenous peoples of Siberia
- Indigenous peoples of the Subarctic

== Bibliography ==
- Gibbon, Guy E.; Ames, Kenneth M. (1998). Archaeology of prehistoric native America: an encyclopedia. Garland reference library of the humanities. Vol. 1537. Taylor & Francis. ISBN 978-0-8153-0725-9.
- Mäki, Jari (2004). "The Annual Cycle of the Settlements of the Circumpolar Peoples". Iskos. -. Artikkeli: 131. ISSN 0355-3108.
- Takashi Irimoto, Takako Yamada (eds.) Circumpolar Religion and Ecology: An Anthropology of the North, University of Tokyo Press, 1994, ISBN 9780860085157.
