= Arctic Council =

Intergovernmental forum for the Arctic

- Arktisk Råd (Danish); Arktiska Ráðið (Faroese); Arktinen neuvosto (Finnish); Conseil de l'Arctique (French); Issittumi Siunnersuisoqatigiit (Greenlandic); Norðurskautsráðið (Icelandic); ᐅᑭᐅᖅᑕᖅᑐᒥ ᑲᑎᒪᔨᖏᑦ (Inuktitut); Arktalasjráde (Lule Sami); Árktalaš ráđđi (Northern Sami); Arktisk råd (Norwegian); Арктический совет (Russian); Arktiska rådet (Swedish)

- Members Observers
- Formation: September 19, 1996; 30 years ago (Ottawa Declaration)
- Type: Intergovernmental organization
- Purpose: Forum for promoting cooperation, coordination, and interaction among the Arctic states, with the involvement of the Arctic Indigenous communities
- Headquarters: Tromsø, Norway (since 2012)
- Members: 8 member countries: Canada; Denmark; Finland; Iceland; Norway; Russia; Sweden; United States
- Main organ: Secretariat
- Website: arctic-council.org

The Arctic Council is a high-level intergovernmental forum that addresses issues faced by the Arctic governments and the indigenous people of the Arctic region. At present, eight countries exercise sovereignty over the lands within the Arctic Circle, and these constitute the member states of the council: Canada; Denmark; Finland; Iceland; Norway; Russia; Sweden; and the United States. Other countries or national groups can be admitted as observer states, while organizations representing the concerns of indigenous peoples can be admitted as indigenous permanent participants.

== History ==
The first step towards the formation of the Council occurred in 1991 when the eight Arctic countries signed the Arctic Environmental Protection Strategy (AEPS). The 1996 Ottawa Declaration established the Arctic Council as a forum for promoting cooperation, coordination, and interaction among the Arctic states, with the involvement of the Arctic Indigenous communities and other Arctic inhabitants on issues such as sustainable development and environmental protection. The Arctic Council has conducted studies on climate change, oil and gas, and Arctic shipping.

In 2011, the Council member states concluded the Arctic Search and Rescue Agreement, the first binding treaty concluded under the council's auspices.

On March 3, 2022, Canada, Denmark, Finland, Iceland, Norway, Sweden and the United States declared that they will not attend meetings of the Arctic Council under Russian chairmanship because of the Russian invasion of Ukraine. The same countries issued a second statement on June 8, 2022, that declared their intent to resume cooperation on a limited number of previously approved Arctic Council projects that do not involve Russian leadership or participation.

== Membership and participation ==
The council is made up of member and observer states, Indigenous permanent participants, and observer organizations.

=== Members ===
Only states with territory in the Arctic can be members of the council. The member states consist of the following:

- Canada
- Kingdom of Denmark
- Republic of Finland
- Iceland
- Kingdom of Norway
- Russian Federation
- Kingdom of Sweden
- United States of America

=== Observers ===
Observer status is open to non-Arctic states approved by the Council at the Ministerial Meetings that occur once every two years. Observers have no voting rights in the council. As of September 2021, thirteen non-Arctic states have observer status. Observer states receive invitations for most Council meetings. Their participation in projects and task forces within the working groups is not always possible, but this poses few problems as few observer states want to participate at such a detailed level.

As of 2025, observer states included:

- Germany, 1998
- Netherlands, 1998
- Poland, 1998
- United Kingdom, 1998
- France, 2000
- Spain, 2006
- China, 2013
- India, 2013
- Italy, 2013
- Japan, 2013
- South Korea, 2013
- Singapore, 2013
- Switzerland, 2017

In 2011, the Council clarified its criteria for admission of observers, most notably including a requirement of applicants to "recognize Arctic States' sovereignty, sovereign rights and jurisdiction in the Arctic" and "recognize that an extensive legal framework applies to the Arctic Ocean including, notably, the Law of the Sea, and that this framework provides a solid foundation for responsible management of this ocean".

==== Pending observer status ====
Pending observer states need to request permission for their presence at each individual meeting; such requests are routine and most of them are granted. At the 2013 Ministerial Meeting in Kiruna, Sweden — the European Union (EU) requested full observer status. It was not granted, mostly because the members do not agree with the EU ban on hunting seals. Although the European Union has a specific Arctic policy and is active in the region, the ongoing Russian invasion of Ukraine prevents it from reconsidering its status within the Arctic Council.

The role of observers was re-evaluated, as were the criteria for admission. As a result, the distinction between permanent and ad hoc observers were dropped.

==== Future observer status ====
In 2023, Brazil expressed its interest in joining the Arctic Council as the first non-Arctic Latin American observer.

=== Indigenous permanent participants ===
Seven of the eight-member states, excluding Iceland, have indigenous communities living in their Arctic areas. Organizations of Arctic Indigenous Peoples can obtain the status of Permanent Participant to the Arctic Council, but only if they represent either one indigenous group residing in more than one Arctic State, or two or more Arctic indigenous peoples groups in a single Arctic state. The number of Permanent Participants should at any time be less than the number of members. The category of Permanent Participants has been created to provide for active participation and full consultation with the Arctic indigenous representatives within the Arctic Council. This principle applies to all meetings and activities of the Arctic Council.

Permanent Participants may address the meetings. They may raise points of order that require an immediate decision by the chairman. Agendas of Ministerial Meetings need to be consulted beforehand with them; they may propose supplementary agenda items. When calling the biannual meetings of Senior Arctic Officials, the Permanent Participants must have been consulted beforehand. Moreover, though only states have a right to vote in the Arctic Council the permanent participants must, according to the Ottawa Declaration be fully consulted, which is close to de facto power of veto should they all reject a particular proposal. This mandatory consultation process matches the consultation and free, prior and informed consent (FPIC) requirement mentioned in the United Nation Declaration on the Rights of Indigenous Peoples. Finally, Permanent Participants may propose cooperative activities, such as projects. All this makes the position of Arctic indigenous peoples within the Arctic Council quite influential compared to the (often marginal) role of such peoples in other international governmental fora. The status of permanent participant is indeed unique and enables circumpolar peoples to be seated at the same table as states' delegations while in any other international organization it is not the case. Nevertheless, decision-making in the Arctic Council remains in the hands of the eight-member states, on the basis of consensus.

As of 2023, six Arctic indigenous communities have Permanent Participant status. These groups are represented by

- The Aleut International Association (AIA), representing more than 15,000 Aleuts in Russia and the United States (Alaska).
- The Arctic Athabaskan Council (AAC), representing 45,000 Athabaskan peoples in Canada (Northwest Territories and Yukon) and the United States (Alaska).
- The Gwich'in Council International (GCI), representing 9,000 Gwichʼin people in Canada (Northwest Territories and Yukon) and the United States (Alaska).
- The Inuit Circumpolar Council (ICC), representing 180,000 Inuit in Canada (Inuit Nunangat), Greenland, Russia (Chukotka) and the United States (Alaska).
- The Russian Association of Indigenous Peoples of the North (RAIPON), representing 250,000 Indigenous peoples of the North, Siberia and the Far East.
- The Saami Council, representing more than 100,000 Sámi of Finland, Norway, Russia and Sweden.

However prominent the role of indigenous peoples, the Permanent Participant status does not confer any legal recognition as peoples. The Ottawa Declaration, the Arctic Council's founding document, explicitly states (in a footnote):

"The use of the term 'peoples' in this declaration shall not be construed as having any implications as regard the rights which may attach to the term under international law."

The Indigenous Permanent Participants are assisted by the Arctic Council Indigenous Peoples Secretariat.

=== Observer organizations ===
Approved intergovernmental organizations and Inter-parliamentary institutions (both global and regional), as well as non-governmental organizations can also obtain Observer Status.

Organizations with observer status currently include the Arctic Parliamentarians, International Union for Conservation of Nature, the International Red Cross Federation, the Nordic Council, the Northern Forum, United Nations Development Programme, United Nations Environment Programme; the Association of World Reindeer Herders, Oceana, the University of the Arctic, and the World Wide Fund for Nature-Arctic Programme.

== Administrative aspects ==
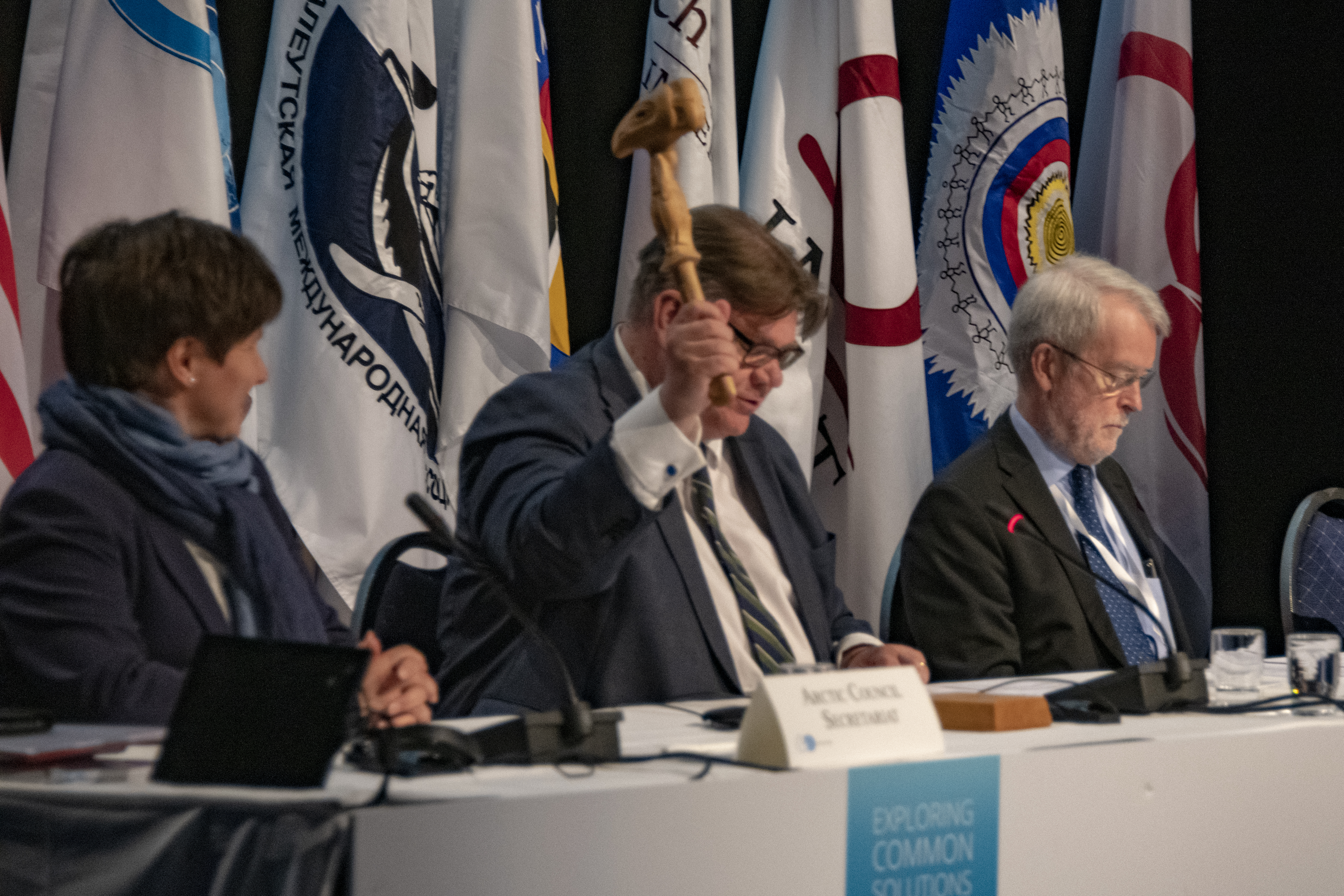
Foreign Minister Timo Soini of Finland chairs the May 2019 ministerial meeting.

=== Meetings ===
The Arctic Council convenes every six months somewhere in the Chair's country for a Senior Arctic Officials (SAO) meeting. SAOs are high-level representatives from the eight-member nations. Sometimes they are ambassadors, but often they are senior foreign ministry officials entrusted with staff-level coordination. Representatives of the six Permanent Participants and the official Observers also are in attendance.

At the end of the two-year cycle, the Chair hosts a Ministerial-level meeting, which is the culmination of the council's work for that period. Most of the eight-member nations are represented by a Minister from their Foreign Affairs, Northern Affairs, or Environment Ministry.

A formal, although non-binding declaration, named for the town in which the meeting is held, sums up the past accomplishments and the future work of the council. These declarations cover climate change, sustainable development, Arctic monitoring and assessment, persistent organic pollutants and other contaminants, and the work of the council's five Working Groups.

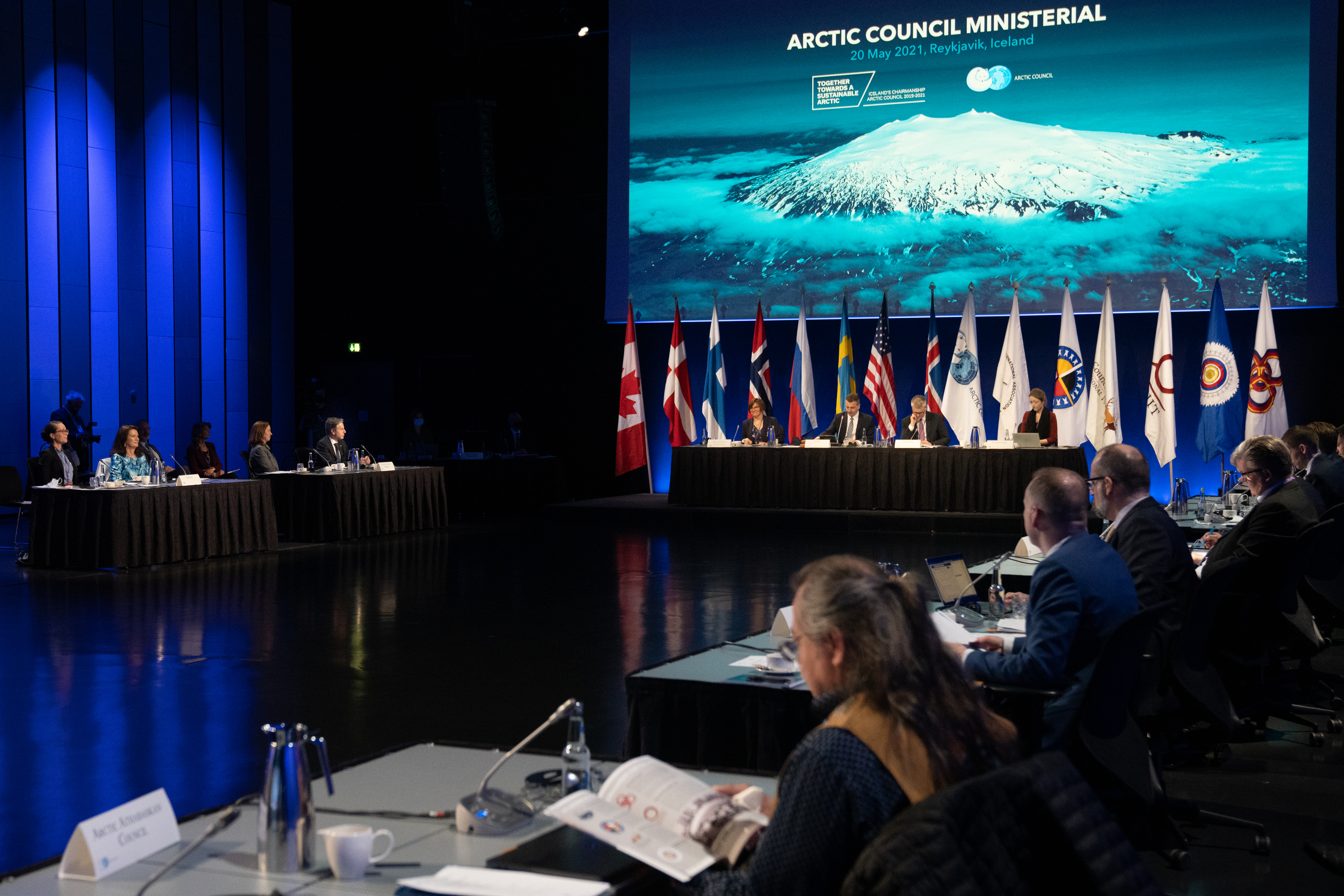
Arctic Council Ministerial Meeting, in Reykjavík, Iceland in 2021

Arctic Council members agreed to action points on protecting the Arctic but most have never materialized.

List of Arctic Council Ministerial Meetings
Date(s)	City	Country
September 17–18, 1998	Iqaluit	Canada
October 13, 2000	Barrow	United States
October 10, 2002	Inari	Finland
November 24, 2004	Reykjavík	Iceland
October 26, 2006	Salekhard	Russia
April 29, 2009	Tromsø	Norway
May 12, 2011	Nuuk	Greenland, Denmark
May 15, 2013	Kiruna	Sweden
April 24, 2015	Iqaluit	Canada
May 10–11, 2017	Fairbanks	United States
May 7, 2019	Rovaniemi	Finland
May 19–20, 2021	Reykjavík	Iceland
May 11, 2023	Salekhard	Russia
May 12, 2025	Tromsø	Norway

=== Chairmanship ===
Chairmanship of the Council rotates every two years. The current chair is Denmark, which serves until the Ministerial meeting in 2027.

- Canada (1996–1998)
- United States (1998–2000)
- Finland (2000–2002)
- Iceland (2002–2004)
- Russia (2004–2006)
- Norway (2006–2009)
- Denmark (2009–2011)
- Sweden (2011–2013)
- Canada (2013–2015)
- United States (2015–2017)
- Finland (2017–2019)
- Iceland (2019–2021)
- Russia (2021–2023)
- Norway (2023–2025)
- Denmark (2025–2027)

Norway, Denmark, and Sweden have agreed on a set of common priorities for the three chairmanships. They also agreed to a shared secretariat 2006–2013.

=== The secretariat ===
Each rotating Chair nation accepts responsibility for maintaining the secretariat, which handles the administrative aspects of the council, including organizing semiannual meetings, hosting the website, and distributing reports and documents. The Norwegian Polar Institute hosted the Arctic Council Secretariat for the six-year period from 2007 to 2013; this was based on an agreement between the three successive Scandinavian Chairs, Norway, Denmark, and Sweden. This temporary Secretariat had a staff of three.

In 2012, the Council moved towards creating a permanent secretariat in Tromsø, Norway.

==== Past directors ====
- Magnús Jóhannesson (Iceland) February 2013 – October 2017
- Nina Buvang Vaaja (Norway) October 2017 – August 2021
- Mathieu Parker (Canada) August 2021 – present

=== The Indigenous Peoples' Secretariat ===
It is costly for the Permanent participants to be represented at every Council meeting, especially since they take place across the entire circumpolar realm. To enhance the capacity of the PPs to pursue the objectives of the Arctic Council and to assist them to develop their internal capacity to participate and intervene in Council meetings, the Council provides financial support to the Indigenous Peoples' Secretariat (IPS).

The IPS board decides on the allocation of the funds. The IPS was established in 1994 under the Arctic Environmental Protection Strategy (AEPS). It was based in Copenhagen until 2016 when it relocated to Tromsø.

In September 2017, Anna Degteva replaced Elle Merete Omma as the executive secretary for the Indigenous Peoples' Secretariat.

=== Working groups, programs and action plans ===
Arctic Council working groups document Arctic problems and challenges such as sea ice loss, glacier melting, tundra thawing, increase of mercury in food chains, and ocean acidification affecting the entire marine ecosystem.

==== Arctic Council working groups ====
- Arctic Monitoring and Assessment Programme (AMAP)
- Conservation of Arctic Flora & Fauna (CAFF)
- Emergency Prevention, Preparedness & Response (EPPR)
- Protection of the Arctic Marine Environment (PAME)
- Sustainable Development Working Group (SDWG)
- Arctic Contaminants Action Program (ACAP) (since 2006)

==== Programs and action plans ====
- Arctic Biodiversity Assessment
- Circumpolar Biodiversity Monitoring Program (CBMP)
- Arctic Climate Impact Assessment
- Arctic Human Development Report

=== Institutional challenges ===
The Arctic Council, however, also faces a range of institutional challenges, some of which relates to the evolving agenda of the Council. As the Arctic region is changing, so is the Arctic Council. With the increasing interests tied to economic, infrastructure and human dimensions making their way to the Council, it has stretched the available resources.

As the Arctic region and the Council are increasingly pulled towards new issue areas, including some previously avoided, its core structure is challenged. Many opinions exist on what types of reform are necessary. These tackle the question of the expanding agenda from two perspectives. Some see it as mission creep, where the Council is unintendedly being dragged into new issue areas. Other’s perceive it as a more natural evolution of the Council to fit the issues of the present. However, it is a common consensus that the Council’s agenda is widening.

Funding is as such a growing issue. With a growing agenda, there is a need for the Council to secure additional funding. However, the funding structure of the Council makes this difficult. The Council’s finances are made up of direct contributions, which vary largely between member states, and in-kind contributions, which are hard to monetise. Especially the smaller and medium-sized members, particularly Norway, contribute a disproportionate share of funding. Already with its existing agenda, questionnaires of those working within, or closely related to, the Council list inadequate funding as a limiting factor to its effectiveness. Further, the funding of the Council lacks transparency. For instance, working groups have their own funding arrangements.

The Council has also been affected by high representative turnover. Representatives are often moved around or replaced by the member states, removing expertise and disrupting continuity. Likewise, the delegation structures of the member states differ vastly. Member states prepare their delegates to varying degrees and positions are often used as career stepping stones. The Council has no control over these decisions, however, they hurt its long-term efficiency and continuity.

== Security and geopolitical issues ==
Before signing the Ottawa Declaration, a footnote was added stating; "The Arctic Council should not deal with matters related to military security". In 2019, United States Secretary of State Mike Pompeo stated that circumstances had changed and "the region has become an arena for power and for competition. And the eight Arctic states must adapt to this new future". The council is often in the middle of security and geopolitical issues since the Arctic has peculiar interests to Member States and Observers. Changes in the Arctic environment and participants of the Arctic Council have led to a reconsideration of the relationship between geopolitical matters and the role of the Arctic Council.. Likewise, the changing nature of the Arctic region has brought into question the role of the Arctic Council. With developments moving the focus to maritime issues rather than terrestrial, the debate is also moved towards questions of jurisdiction and security, outside the scope of the Arctic Council.

However, some say that the Arctic Council facilitates stability despite possible conflicts among member states. Norwegian Admiral Haakon Bruun-Hanssen has suggested that the Arctic is "probably the most stable area in the world." They say that laws are well established and followed. Member states think that the sharing cost of the development of Arctic shipping-lanes, research, etc., by cooperation and good relationships between states is beneficial to all.

=== Arctic exceptionalism and cooperation ===
The Arctic region was for a long time seen politically as something exceptional. Arctic exceptionalism is the notion that the Arctic was detached from general power politics and geopolitical tension. The Arctic was too remote and the conditions too harsh. Rather, the regional actors sought peace and cooperation with one another, despite some Arctic states being traditional rivals.

The Arctic Council is central to the making of Arctic exceptionalism. The Council emerged from a series of initiatives and compromise, but also the demilitarisation of the region. The cooperative nature was reflected in the setup of the Council, working as a forum with set goals and with consensus decision-making. By focusing on the issues of environmental protection and sustainable development, while disqualifying difficult questions such as military security, the Council found success as a “problem solving forum.”

As an intergovernmental forum, the Arctic Council has promoted member collaboration in science and regional initiatives through its networks and working groups.

While the Arctic Council has traditionally excluded military security from its agenda in order to preserve regional cooperation, the evolving nature of environmental threats has increasingly challenged this framework. In 2025, Iceland became the first member state to formally classify the potential collapse of the Atlantic meridional overturning circulation (AMOC) as a national security risk, framing a climatic phenomenon as an existential threat to national security.

=== Geographical disputes ===
Disputes over land and ocean in the Arctic had been extremely limited. The only outstanding land dispute was between Canada and Denmark, the Whisky War, over Hans Island, which was resolved in the summer of 2022 with agreement to split the island in half. There are oceanic claims between the United States and Canada in the Beaufort Sea.

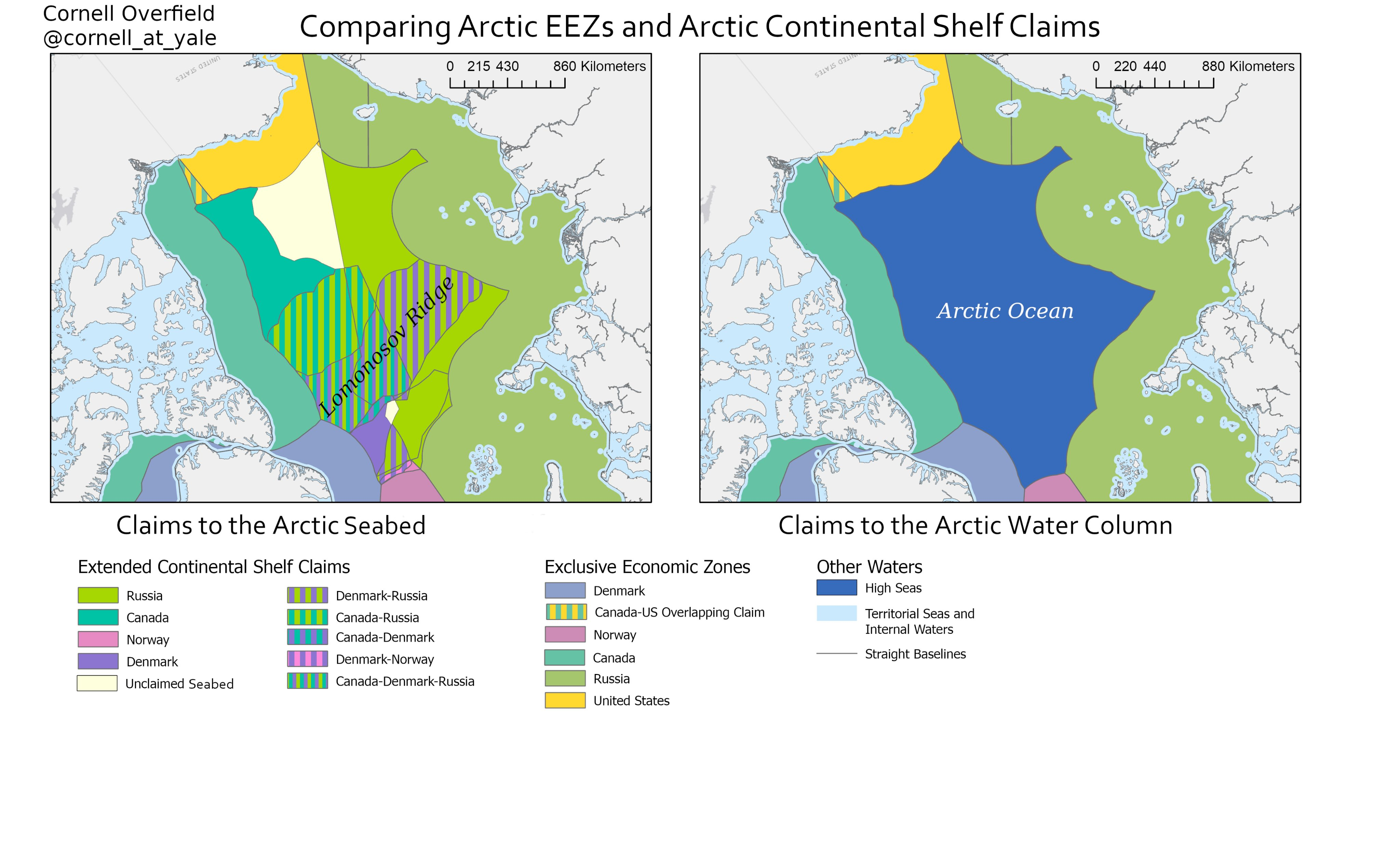
Claims to the Arctic Seabed and Arctic Sea.

The major territorial disputes are over exclusive rights to the seabed under the central Arctic high seas. Due to climate change and melting of the Arctic sea-ice, more energy resources and waterways are now becoming accessible. Large reserves of oil, gas and minerals are located within the Arctic. This environmental factor generated territorial disputes among member states. The United Nations Convention on the Law of the Sea allows states to extend their exclusive right to exploit resources on and in the continental shelf if they can prove that seabed more than 200 nautical miles (370 km; 230 mi) from baselines is a natural prolongation of the land. Canada, Russia, and Denmark (via Greenland) have all submitted partially overlapping claims to the UN Commission on the Limits of the Continental Shelf (CLCS), which is charged with confirming the continental shelf's outer limits. Once the CLCS makes its rulings, Russia, Denmark, and Canada will need to negotiate to divide their overlapping claims.

Disputes also exist over the nature of the Northwest Passage and the Northeast Passage / Northern Sea Route. Canada claims the entire Northwest Passage are Canadian Internal Waters, which means Canada would have total control over which ships may enter the channel. The United States believes the Passage is an international strait, which would mean any ship could transit at any time, and Canada could not close the Passage. Russia's claims over the Northern Sea Route are significantly different. Russia only claims small segments of the Northern Sea Route around straits as internal waters. However, Russia requires all commercial vessels to request and obtain permission to navigate in a large area of the Russian Arctic exclusive economic zone under Article 234 of the UN Convention on the Law of the Sea, which grants coastal states greater powers over ice-covered waters.

Canadian sovereignty over the Northwest Passage arouses substantial public concern in Canada. A poll indicated that half of Canadian respondents said Canada should try to assert its full sovereignty rights over the Beaufort Sea compared to just 10 percent of Americans. New commercial trans-Arctic shipping routes can be another factor of conflicts. A poll found that Canadians perceive the Northwest Passage as their internal Canadian waterway whereas other countries assert it is an international waterway.

=== Reactions to Russia’s invasion of Ukraine ===
The Arctic Council faced an unprecedented challenge in 2022 following the Russian invasion of Ukraine. In response, the Council’s seven other member states condemned the invasion, halting cooperative projects involving Russia and effectively freezing much of the Council’s multilateral work. This response highlighted deeper divisions between Russia and the Western bloc within the Council, straining the inclusivity that had previously characterized its operations.

Despite these challenges, the Council successfully transitioned its chairmanship from Russia to Norway in 2023, demonstrating its capacity to maintain institutional continuity under difficult circumstances. This was in part due to the Council’s soft nature as a consensus seeking forum. Because there were no legal obligations requiring a full suspension. Rather it allowed diplomatic channels to stay open and for dialogue to continue. This aided the eventual re-opening.

However, relations with Russia within the Council remain strained, and questions persist about how the Council will navigate its relationship with Russia moving forward. This period has underscored the increasing relevance of geopolitical considerations in the Council’s operations. While originally focused on environmental protection and sustainable development, the Arctic Council now finds itself grappling with the broader realities of global power politics and their impact on regional governance.

=== Observer status and geopolitical tensions ===
The increase in the number of observer states has drawn attention to other national interests, including economic and security issues. Observers have demonstrated their interests in the Arctic region. For example, China has explicitly shown its desire to extract natural resources in Greenland. The increasing amount of actors who hold strong interests in the Arctic region has challenged the Arctic Council’s role as the central regional forum for governing the Arctic. With the introduction of more observer states, including non-Arctic ones, the region is changing from one based on soft regionalism into a global clash of national interests.

The observer status system within the Arctic Council has increasingly become a source of geopolitical tension. Observers include non-Arctic states such as China, Japan, and South Korea, alongside intergovernmental and non-governmental organizations. China’s inclusion as a permanent observer in 2013 sparked significant debate among member states. While observers lack decision-making power, their participation has raised concerns about the influence of powerful non-Arctic actors on the Council’s governance. This challenges the Council and its role, as it must balance relations inside and outside the Council.

China’s growing interest in Arctic resources and shipping routes has fueled broader strategic concerns. Some opinions view its participation as a necessary step toward fostering international cooperation, while others see it as a potential risk to Arctic sovereignty. These tensions reflect the challenge of balancing inclusivity with the need to safeguard regional interests, a dynamic that has become increasingly prominent in the Council’s activities.

Military infrastructure is another point to consider. Canada, Denmark, Norway and Russia are rapidly increasing their defence presence by building up their militaries in the Arctic and developing their building infrastructure.

Arctic cooperation, however, is also adapting to these changes. While not directly tied to the Arctic Council itself, there has been examples of traditional rival countries participating in military exercises together, such as Operation Northern Eagle. While the Arctic Council still is under the formal ban on “military security”, the changing cooperation is translating into the Council gradually tackling “soft security” questions. For example, several working groups have looked into issues of resilience and adaptation related to both human societies and nature, rather than limiting themselves to documenting alterations.

=== Discourse and media narratives ===
Media narratives have played a significant role in shaping perceptions of the Arctic Council and its activities. The China threat narrative, for example, portrays China as leveraging its observer status to pursue economic and strategic advantages in the Arctic. These portrayals have contributed to broader geopolitical concerns, despite evidence that China has largely adhered to the Council’s cooperative norms.

Similarly, the concept of a resource rush in the Arctic has been amplified by media portrayals, framing the region as a potential hotspot for conflict over resources and maritime routes. While such narratives have heightened attention to the Arctic’s strategic importance, they often oversimplify the Council’s efforts to maintain neutrality and collaborative governance. These dynamics illustrate the increasing complexity of balancing the Arctic Council’s original mission with growing global interest in the region.

=== The role of the Arctic Council ===
Different perspectives exist regarding the role of the Arctic Council. Some suggest that the it should expand its role by including new issues on its agenda. On peace and security, a 2010 survey showed that large majorities of respondents in Norway, Canada, Finland, Iceland, and Denmark were very supportive on the issues of an Arctic nuclear-weapons free zone. Although only a small majority of Russian respondents supported such measures, more than 80 percent of them agreed that the Arctic Council should cover peace-building issues. Paul Berkman suggests that solving security matters in the Arctic Council could save members the much larger amount of time required to reach a decision in United Nations. When questioned, people who have been working within, or in close proximity to, the Council, showcase the view that its main impacts lay in specific working groups and products. Many see reform as necessary if it is to remain critical. However, they are optimistic and highlight its role as a body to help resolve Arctic issues. While it is hard to expect much from the member states in the Council, it may facilitate the necessary networks around it.

However, as of June 2014, military security matters are often avoided. The focus on science and resource protection and management is seen as a priority, which could be diluted or strained by the discussion of geopolitical security issues. This scepticism is prevalent, also amongst those close to the organisation. The political tensions of the region challenge the Council’s effectiveness, as challenges are moved to national, rather than common interests.

== See also ==
- Arctic Economic Council
- Arctic cooperation and politics
- Arctic policy of Canada – Arctic Council Chair 2013–2015
- Arctic policy of the United States – Arctic Council Chair 2015–2017
- Antarctic Treaty System
- Ilulissat Declaration
- International Arctic Science Committee
- United Nations Convention on the Law of the Sea
- NATO Arctic Sentry

== Bibliography ==
- Danita Catherine Burke. 2020. Diplomacy and the Arctic Council. McGill Queen University Press.
- Wiseman, Matthew (2020). "The Future of the Arctic Council". In Coates, Ken; Holroyd, Carin (eds.). The Palgrave Handbook of Arctic Policy and Politics. Oxford: Osprey Publishing. pp. 439–452. ISBN 978-3-030-20556-0.
