= Arctic Council Indigenous Peoples Secretariat =

Department of the Arctic Council

- Purpose: Assist indigenous peoples' organizations with the dissemination of information and in advancing their causes
- Members: Six member organizations: Aleut International Association; Arctic Athabaskan Council; Gwich'in Council International; Inuit Circumpolar Council; Russian Association of Indigenous Peoples of the North; Saami Council
- Parent organisation: Arctic Council

The Arctic Council Indigenous Peoples' Secretariat (IPS) is a secretariat for the six international Indigenous organizations affiliated with the eight-nation Arctic Council. The IPS does not represent indigenous peoples or their organizations, but assists those organizations in presenting their causes, and helps to disseminate information among them. IPS was established in 1994 under the auspices of the Arctic Environmental Protection Strategy (AEPS). It was around the same time that the category of Permanent Participants was being developed and applied to the three indigenous peoples' organizations then observers in the AEPS. When the Arctic Council was established in 1996, both the Permanent Participants and IPS was reinserted into the new intergovernmental framework. Since commencing business in 1994, the role of the secretariat has been to facilitate contributions from the Permanent Participants to the cooperation of the eight Arctic states and to assist the Permanent Participants in performing, mainly communicational task.

== The work of IPS ==
The Arctic Council Indigenous Peoples' Secretariat is a support Secretariat for the International Indigenous Peoples' Organizations that have Permanent Participant status in the Arctic Council. IPS assists with creating opportunities for the Indigenous Peoples' Organizations to present their causes, and helps provide them with necessary information and materials.

IPS work includes:

• Ensuring that Permanent Participants are sent documents and reports connected to the work of the Arctic Council and its working groups.

• Helping Permanent Participants to present their views to the Arctic Council and its Working Groups.

• Collecting and communicating information about the Arctic Council and its results to the Indigenous Peoples in the various parts of the Arctic.

• Providing co-ordination for the Indigenous Peoples' Organizations to meet with each other, and to participate in the Arctic Council Working Groups.

== Governing Board and staff ==
A Governing Board, chosen from among the six indigenous peoples' groups that are permanent participants, directs the work of IPS and approves its annual work agenda. Permanent participants choose the Chair of the Governing Board, a position that rotates among the six indigenous groups. The current Chair, Ethel Blake, representing Gwich'in Council International, assumed the two-year post in 2017; the previous incumbent was Tommy Pedersen of the Saami Council, who had held the post since 2009.

The working language for meetings of the IPS is English; official communications, however, are published in both English and Russian. The Executive Secretary is responsible for daily operations and for directing IPS staff. Workplace rules and regulations, as well as accounting and auditing procedures, follow Danish law.

=== Executive Secretaries ===
- 2017–Present: Anna Degteva
- 2014–2017: Elle Merete Omma
- 2009–2014: Erik Gant
- 2006–2008: Rune Fjellheim
- 2002–2005: John Crump
- 1996–2000: Tove Søvndahl (Pedersen) Gant
- 1994–1996: Chester Reimer

== The Indigenous Peoples organizations ==
There are six indigenous peoples organizations covering the Arctic, they all have status of permanent participants in the Arctic Council

=== Aleut International Association ===
The Aleut International Association (AIA) represents Aleut on the Russian and American Aleutian, Pribilof and Commander Islands. It is an Alaska Native not-for-profit corporation, 501(c)(3), registered in the State of Alaska, United States of America, in 1998.

AIA was formed by the Aleutian/Pribilof Islands Association, U.S. (one of the thirteen regional not-for-profit Alaska Native corporations created as a result of Alaska Native Claims Settlement Act in 1971), and the Association of the Indigenous Peoples of the North of the Aleut District of the Kamchatka Region of the Russian Federation (AIPNADKR). AIA is governed by a Board of Directors composed of four Alaskan and four Russian Aleuts under the leadership of a president. The current president is Mr. Michael Zacharof of Saint Paul Island (Alaska), Alaska. The Executive Director is Victoria Gofman of Anchorage, Alaska.

The organization was formed to address environmental and cultural concerns of the extended Aleut family whose well-being has been connected to the rich resources of the Bering Sea for millennia. Russian and American Aleuts are separated by distances, borders and the International Date Line but united by the great Bering Sea and the North Pacific. Today, not only does the Aleut community share the resources of the region but the environmental problems as well. The need to understand global processes, such as trans-boundary contaminants transport, the impacts of climate change, and the effects of commercial fisheries on the ecosystem of the Bering Sea to name a few, was an impetus in joining in the work of international fora. The AIA is actively pursuing collaboration with governments, scientists, and other organizations in developing programs and policies that could improve the well-being of the Aleut people and their environment.

AIA was admitted as a permanent participant of the Arctic Council in 1998 and was granted Special Consultative Status by the United Nations Economic and Social Council in 2004. In addition, AIA is an accredited Non Governmental Organization (NGO) with the United Nations Framework Convention on Climate Change (UNFCCC) and the Global Environment Facility (GEF).

=== Arctic Athabaskan Council ===
The Arctic Athabaskan Council (AAC) is an international treaty organization established to represent the interests of United States and Canadian Athabaskan member First Nation governments in Arctic Council fora, and to foster a greater understanding of the common heritage of all Athabaskan peoples of Arctic North America.

The founding members of AAC include four Alaskan Athabaskan communities (Chickaloon Village Traditional Council, Healy Lake Traditional Council (Mendees Cheeg), Stevens Village Tribal Government Council, Northway Tribal Council) - and three Athabaskan representative bodies on the Canadian side - the Council of Yukon First Nations, representing eleven Yukon First Nations; the Dene Nation, representing 30 First Nations in the Northwest Territories and northern Manitoba; and Northwest Territory Métis Nation, representing 13 communities in the Northwest Territories. In total, Arctic Athabaskan founding member governments represent approximately 32,000 indigenous peoples of Athabaskan descent residing in Arctic and Sub-Arctic North America. As more member governments from both the United States (Alaska) and Canada join, this number is expected to increase to approximately 40,000.

=== Gwich'in Council International ===
The Gwich'in Council International (GCI) was established as a non-profit organization in 1999 by the Gwich'in Tribal Council in Inuvik, NWT, to ensure all regions of the Gwich'in Nation in the Northwest Territories, Yukon and Alaska are represented at the Arctic Council, as well as to play an active and significant role in the development of policies that relate to the Circumpolar Arctic. GCI has a number of priorities that relate to the environment, youth, culture and tradition, social and economic development and education.

The founding members of GCI includes six Alaskan Gwich'in communities (Arctic Village, Chalkyitsik, Fort Yukon, Birch, Circle and Venetie), two Gwich'in representative bodies in Canada - Vuntut Gwitchin First Nation representing Vuntut Gwitchin in Old Crow, Yukon, and Gwich'in Tribal Council representing four communities in the Inuvik Region in the Northwest Territories. In total, the Gwich'in Council International founding members represent approximately 9,000 indigenous peoples of Gwich'in descent.

The GCI Secretariat rotates between the Gwich'in Tribal Council in Inuvik, NWT and the Vuntut Gwitchin First Nation in Old Crow, Yukon.

=== Inuit Circumpolar Council ===
The Inuit Circumpolar Council (ICC) is a transnational non-governmental organization representing 150,000 Inuit across the Circumpolar North. The ICC began originally as an Inuit Circumpolar Conference, first held in 1977, and gradually evolved to become a Council in the 10th General Assembly meeting of the Inuit Circumpolar Conference in 2006 in Utqiagvik, Alaska.

The ICC represents today four different Inuit regional organizations in Canada, Alaska, Greenland and Russia:

1. ICC Alaska consists of Inuit from the North Slope Borough, Northwest Arctic Borough, the Bering Straits Region, and the Yukon-Kuskokwim Region
2. ICC Canada represents the four land-claim regions, namely Inuvialuit, Labrador, Nunavik, and Nunavut.
3. ICC Greenland differs from the other regional Councils, representing different organisms of the Greenlandic society instead of representing specific area within the country. Members in the Greenlandic ICC are thus NGOs like the women's association, political entities such as Greenland's parliament and political parties and special-interest groups, e.g. Greenland's workers union (SIK).
4. ICC Chukotka (Russia) was started 2001 and it operates closely with the Yupik Society, which represents Chukotka's Inuit locally and nationally.

The principal objective of the ICC is to create unity amongst the Inuit to be able to promote their common agenda on the international level. In addition, the ICC stresses the importance of sustainable environmental management in order to preserve the wildlife and biological diversity and recalls the right of Inuit to the natural resources in their traditional areas.

=== Russian Association of Indigenous Peoples of the North ===
Russian Association of Indigenous Peoples of the North (RAIPON) unites 41 indigenous groups whose total population is around 250,000 people. These peoples are represented by 34 regional and ethnic organizations that have the authority to represent these groups both in Russia and in the international community.

RAIPON was created in 1990 at the First Congress of Indigenous Peoples of the North. The Association was originally called the "Association of Peoples of the North of the USSR" and united 26 indigenous groups of the North Russia.

=== The Saami Council ===
The Saami Council is a non-governmental Saami organization (NGO), with member organizations in Finland, Russia, Norway and Sweden. Since its foundation in 1956 the Saami Council has actively dealt with Saami policy tasks. The primary aims of the Saami Council are the promotion of Saami rights and interests in the four countries having Saami population, to consolidate the feeling of affinity among the Saami people, to attain recognition for the Saami as one nation and to promote economic, social and cultural rights of the Saami in the legislation of the four states, Norway, Sweden, Russia and Finland. The Saami Council renders opinions and makes proposals on questions concerning Saami people's rights, language and culture.

== International collaboration ==
IPS is an active member of the University of the Arctic. UArctic is an international cooperative network based in the Circumpolar Arctic region, consisting of more than 200 universities, colleges, and other organizations with an interest in promoting education and research in the Arctic region.
