= 2025 Yamalo-Nenets Autonomous Okrug legislative election =

Regional legislative election in Russia

← 2020	12–14 September 2025	2030 →

All 22 seats in the Legislative Assembly 12 seats needed for a majority
- Turnout: 49.25% ▲2.14 pp
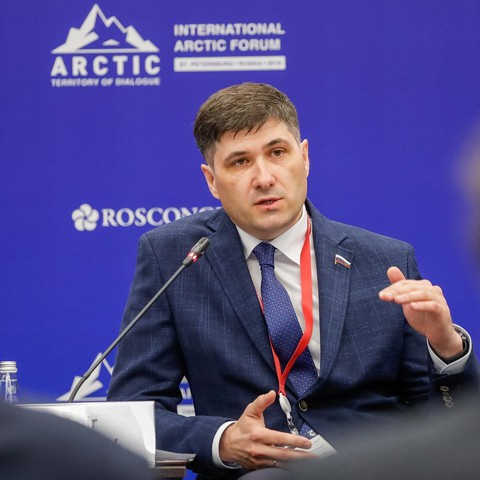

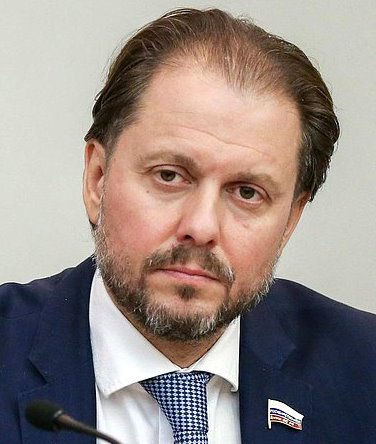
	Majority party	Minority party
Candidate	Vladimir Pushkaryov	Vladimir Sysoyev
Party	United Russia	LDPR
Last election	64.64%, 18 seats	15.31%, 2 seats
Seats won	18	2
Seat change	Steady	Steady
Popular vote	114,237	28,067
Percentage	65.60%	16.12%
Swing	▲0.96 pp	▲0.81 pp
	Third party	Fourth party
	CPRF	SR–ZP
Candidate	Yelena Kukushkina	Maksim Lazarev
Party	CPRF	SR–ZP
Last election	8.83%, 1 seat	6.05%, 1 seat
Seats won	1	1
Seat change	Steady	Steady
Popular vote	18,217	11,168
Percentage	10.46%	6.41%
Swing	▲1.63 pp	▲0.36 pp
Chairman before election
Sergey Yamkin
United Russia
Elected Chairman
Sergey Yamkin
United Russia

The 2025 Legislative Assembly of Yamalo-Nenets Autonomous Okrug election took place on 12–14 September 2025. All 22 seats in the Legislative Assembly were up for re-election.

United Russia increased its already overwhelming majority in the Legislative Assembly, winning 65.6% of the vote and all 11 single-mandate constituencies. Liberal Democratic Party of Russia, Communist Party of the Russian Federation and A Just Russia – For Truth all retained their factions, slightly increasing vote share.

== Electoral system ==
Under current election laws, the Legislative Assembly is elected for a term of five years, with parallel voting. 11 seats are elected by party-list proportional representation with a 5% electoral threshold, with the other half elected in 11 single-member constituencies by first-past-the-post voting. Seats in the proportional part are allocated using the Imperiali quota, modified to ensure that every party list, which passes the threshold, receives at least one mandate.

== Candidates ==
=== Party lists ===
To register regional lists of candidates, parties need to collect 0.5% of signatures of all registered voters in Yamalo-Nenets Autonomous Okrug.

The following parties were relieved from the necessity to collect signatures:

- United Russia
- Communist Party of the Russian Federation
- Liberal Democratic Party of Russia
- A Just Russia — Patriots — For Truth
- New People

№	Party	Territorial groups leaders	Candidates	Territorial groups	Status
1	A Just Russia – For Truth	Viktor Ushakov • Dmitry Petrov • Fakhrad Ibragimov • Darya Cherlenyuk • Maksim Lazarev • Yulia Kovaleva • Vera Kapshanova • ~~Viktoria Shishkina~~ • Denis Kovalev • Irina Koldomova • Aleksey Ponomarev	30	11	Registered
2	United Russia	Vladimir Pushkaryov • Kirill Trapeznikov • Alla Umetskaya • Olga Peskova • Aleksey Sitnikov • Marina Treskova • Polina Shumova • Sergey Tokarev • Maksim Zabolotskikh • Viktor Yugay • Vadim Kugayevsky	55	11	Registered
3	Communist Party	Yevgeny Shchitikov • Yelena Kukushkina • Aleksandr Lamdo • Yefrat Ramazanov • Alibek Dzhabuyev • Ivan Levchenko • Yelizaveta Pyak • Lyudmila Zhuravleva	38	8	Registered
4	Liberal Democratic Party	Dmitry Shvayka • Lyubov Pozdeyeva • Sergey Sozonov • Artyom Pikalov • Denis Sadovnikov • Sergey Shvidchenko • Ilya Yando • Vladimir Sysoyev • Artyom Ivanov • Andrey Kuznetsov • Sergey Stolyarov	43	11	Registered

Communist Party of Social Justice and Rodina, which participated in the last election, did not file, while Party of Growth has been dissolved since.

=== Single-mandate constituencies ===
11 single-mandate constituencies were formed in Yamalo-Nenets Autonomous Okrug. To register candidates in single-mandate constituencies need to collect 3% of signatures of registered voters in the constituency.

Number of candidates in single-mandate constituencies
Party	Candidates	
Party	Nominated	Registered
United Russia	11	11
Liberal Democratic Party	11	11
Communist Party	8	8
A Just Russia – For Truth	9	9
Independent	11	11
Total	50	50

== Results ==
=== Results by party lists ===
Summary of the 12–14 September 2025 Legislative Assembly of Yamalo-Nenets Autonomous Okrug election results
Party	Party list					Constituency		Total	
Party	Votes	%	±pp	Seats	+/–	Seats	+/–	Seats	+/–
United Russia	114,237	65.60	▲0.96	7	Steady	11	Steady	18	Steady
Liberal Democratic Party	28,067	16.12	▲0.81	2	Steady	0	Steady	2	Steady
Communist Party	18,217	10.46	▲1.63	1	Steady	0	Steady	1	Steady
A Just Russia — For Truth	11,168	6.41	▲0.36	1	Steady	0	Steady	1	Steady
Independent	–	–	–	–	–	0	Steady	0	Steady
Invalid ballots	2,441	1.40	▼0.42	—	—	—	—	—	—
Total	174,130	100.00	—	11	Steady	11	Steady	22	Steady
Turnout	174,130	49.25	▲2.14	—	—	—	—	—	—
Registered voters	353,578	100.00	—	—	—	—	—	—	—

Sergey Yamkin (United Russia) was re-elected as Chairman of the Legislative Assembly, while former First Deputy Chairman Aleksey Sitnikov (United Russia) was appointed to the Federation Council, replacing retiring incumbent Senator Grigory Ledkov (United Russia).

=== Results in single-member constituencies ===
==== District 1 ====
Summary of the 12–14 September 2025 Legislative Assembly of Yamalo-Nenets Autonomous Okrug election in Salekhardsky constituency No.1
Candidate	Party	Votes	%
Aleksey Denisov (incumbent)	United Russia	10,549	65.08%
Sergey Sozonov	Liberal Democratic Party	1,858	11.46%
Aleksandr Lamdo	Communist Party	1,663	10.26%
Eduard Ayupov	A Just Russia – For Truth	1,578	9.73%
Vadim Lipikhin	Independent	316	1.95%
Total		16,210	100%

==== District 2 ====
Summary of the 12–14 September 2025 Legislative Assembly of Yamalo-Nenets Autonomous Okrug election in Labytnangsky constituency No.2
Candidate	Party	Votes	%
Sergey Yamkin (incumbent)	United Russia	11,500	70.49%
Igor Vorobyev	Liberal Democratic Party	2,213	13.57%
Yelizaveta Pyak	Communist Party	1,235	7.57%
Vera Kapshanova	A Just Russia – For Truth	976	5.98%
Anastasia Glumova	Independent	249	1.53%
Total		16,314	100%

==== District 3 ====
Summary of the 12–14 September 2025 Legislative Assembly of Yamalo-Nenets Autonomous Okrug election in Tazovsky constituency No.3
Candidate	Party	Votes	%
Andrey Kugayevsky	United Russia	9,210	68.85%
Ilya Yando	Liberal Democratic Party	1,652	12.35%
Marina Khorotetto	Communist Party	1,278	9.55%
Aleksandr Ader	Independent	1,044	7.81%
Total		13,376	100%

==== District 4 ====
Summary of the 12–14 September 2025 Legislative Assembly of Yamalo-Nenets Autonomous Okrug election in Nadymsky constituency No.4
Candidate	Party	Votes	%
Igor Gerelishin (incumbent)	United Russia	11,742	65.03%
Sergey Terebentsev	Independent	2,637	14.60%
Maksim Konovalov	Liberal Democratic Party	2,349	13.01%
Aleksey Ponomarev	A Just Russia – For Truth	1,220	6.76%
Total		18,057	100%

==== District 5 ====
Summary of the 12–14 September 2025 Legislative Assembly of Yamalo-Nenets Autonomous Okrug election in Novourengoysky constituency No.5
Candidate	Party	Votes	%
Aleksey Ageyev	United Russia	9,209	56.65%
Lyubov Pozdeyeva	Liberal Democratic Party	2,671	16.43%
Olga Isaykina	Independent	1,719	10.58%
Dmitry Petrov	A Just Russia – For Truth	1,358	8.35%
Yevgeny Shchitikov	Communist Party	1,060	6.52%
Total		16,255	100%

==== District 6 ====
Summary of the 12–14 September 2025 Legislative Assembly of Yamalo-Nenets Autonomous Okrug election in Novourengoysky constituency No.6
Candidate	Party	Votes	%
Aleksey Skurikhin	United Russia	10,419	60.17%
Artyom Pikalov	Liberal Democratic Party	2,531	14.62%
Alibek Dzhabuyev	Communist Party	2,314	13.36%
Yevgeny Miller	Independent	1,021	5.90%
Darya Cherlenyuk	A Just Russia – For Truth	858	4.95%
Total		17,317	100%

==== District 7 ====
Summary of the 12–14 September 2025 Legislative Assembly of Yamalo-Nenets Autonomous Okrug election in Noyabrsky constituency No.7
Candidate	Party	Votes	%
Maksim Solodov	United Russia	8,230	55.24%
Dmitry Shvayka	Liberal Democratic Party	2,242	15.05%
Roman Musalov	Communist Party	2,091	14.03%
Viktor Ushakov	A Just Russia – For Truth	1,346	9.03%
Lyubov Konstantinova	Independent	751	5.04%
Total		14,899	100%

==== District 8 ====
Summary of the 12–14 September 2025 Legislative Assembly of Yamalo-Nenets Autonomous Okrug election in Noyabrsky constituency No.8
Candidate	Party	Votes	%
Nikolay Shestopalov	United Russia	8,551	55.36%
Yelena Kukushkina	Communist Party	2,334	15.11%
Sergey Shvidchenko	Liberal Democratic Party	2,166	14.02%
Igor Tkachenko	Independent	1,241	8.03%
Dmitry Kovalev	A Just Russia – For Truth	934	6.05%
Total		15,446	100%

==== District 9 ====
Summary of the 12–14 September 2025 Legislative Assembly of Yamalo-Nenets Autonomous Okrug election in Muravlenkovsky constituency No.9
Candidate	Party	Votes	%
Timur Suleymenov	United Russia	7,621	59.40%
Tatyana Kulikova	Liberal Democratic Party	2,687	20.94%
Ivan Volkov	Independent	2,349	18.31%
Total		12,831	100%

==== District 10 ====
Summary of the 12–14 September 2025 Legislative Assembly of Yamalo-Nenets Autonomous Okrug election in Gubkinsky constituency No.10
Candidate	Party	Votes	%
Viktor Kazarin (incumbent)	United Russia	7,370	65.28%
Sergey Stolyarov	Liberal Democratic Party	1,864	16.51%
Fakhrad Ibragimov	A Just Russia – For Truth	763	6.76%
Yelena Kovalenko	Independent	1,118	9.90%
Total		11,290	100%

==== District 11 ====
Summary of the 12–14 September 2025 Legislative Assembly of Yamalo-Nenets Autonomous Okrug election in Purovsky constituency No.11
Candidate	Party	Votes	%
Yevgeny Yevseyev	United Russia	10,278	61.79%
Artyom Ivanov	Liberal Democratic Party	2,984	17.94%
Oleg Ponomarev	Communist Party	1,333	8.01%
Irina Koldomova	A Just Russia – For Truth	1,023	6.15%
Yevgeny Nikulin	Independent	901	5.42%
Total		16,634	100%

=== Members ===
Incumbent deputies are highlighted with bold, elected members who declined to take a seat are marked with ~~strikethrough~~.

Constituency
No.	Member	Party
1	Aleksey Denisov	United Russia
2	Sergey Yamkin	United Russia
3	Andrey Kugayevsky	United Russia
4	Igor Gerelishin	United Russia
5	Aleksey Ageyev	United Russia
6	Aleksey Skurikhin	United Russia
7	Maksim Solodov	United Russia
8	Nikolay Shestopalov	United Russia
9	Timur Suleymenov	United Russia
10	Viktor Kazarin	United Russia
11	Yevgeny Yevseyev	United Russia

Party lists
Member	Party
~~Marina Treskova~~	United Russia
Ivan Sakal	United Russia
~~Viktor Yugay~~	United Russia
Eduard Yaungad	United Russia
~~Sergey Tokarev~~	United Russia
Natalia Figol	United Russia
Aleksey Sitnikov	United Russia
~~Vladimir Pushkaryov~~	United Russia
Igor Pronin	United Russia
~~Olga Peskova~~	United Russia
Anastasia Kazantseva	United Russia
~~Kirill Trapeznikov~~	United Russia
Tatyana Buchkova	United Russia
Andrey Kuznetsov	Liberal Democratic Party
Denis Sadovnikov	Liberal Democratic Party
Yelena Kukushkina	Communist Party
Maksim Lazarev	A Just Russia – For Truth

== See also ==
- 2025 Russian regional elections
