= 2026 Khanty-Mansi Autonomous Okrug legislative election =

Regional legislative election in Russia

- 18–20 September 2026

All 40 seats in the Duma 21 seats needed for a majority
- Turnout: 60.69% ▲16.08 pp
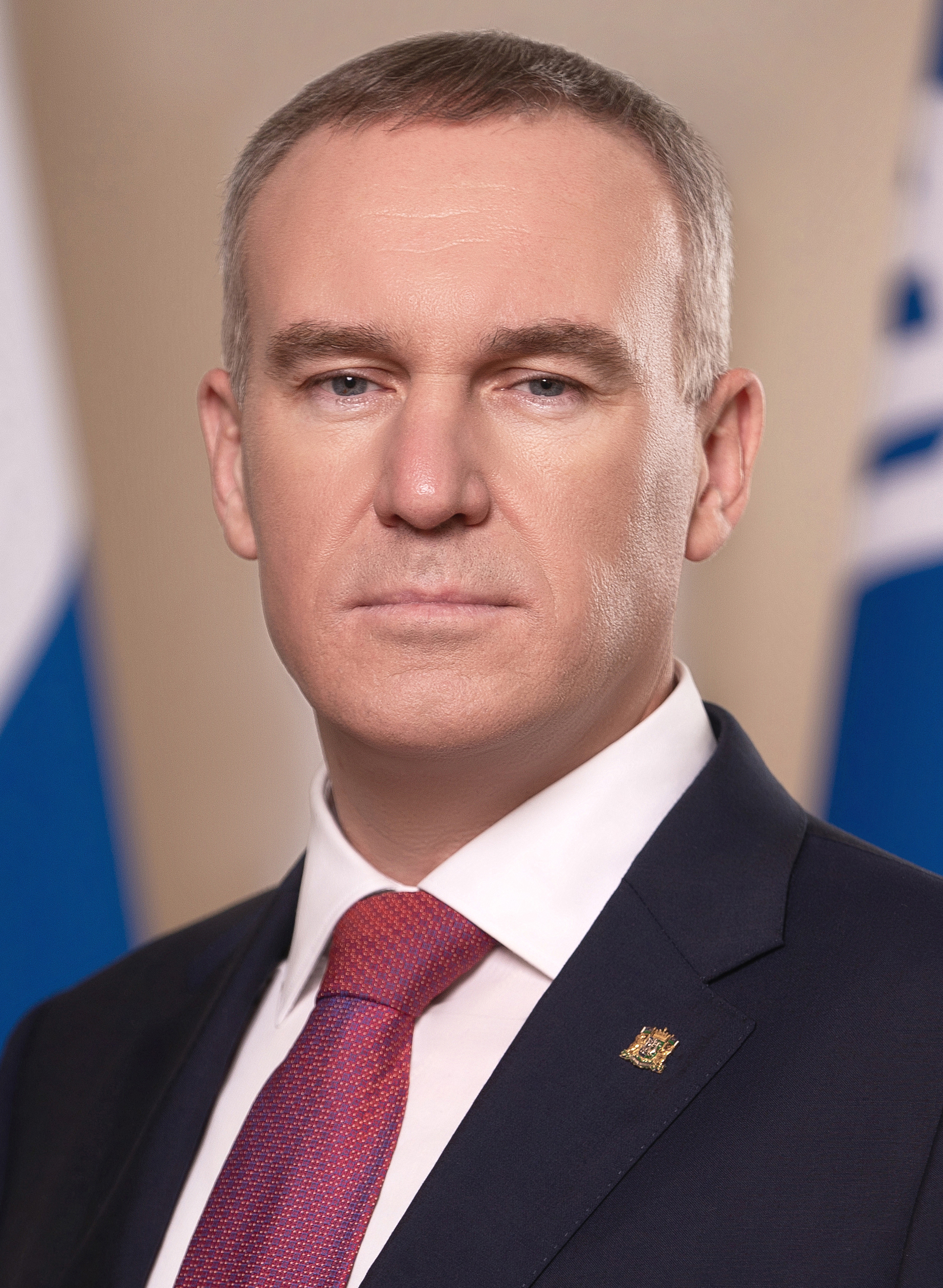

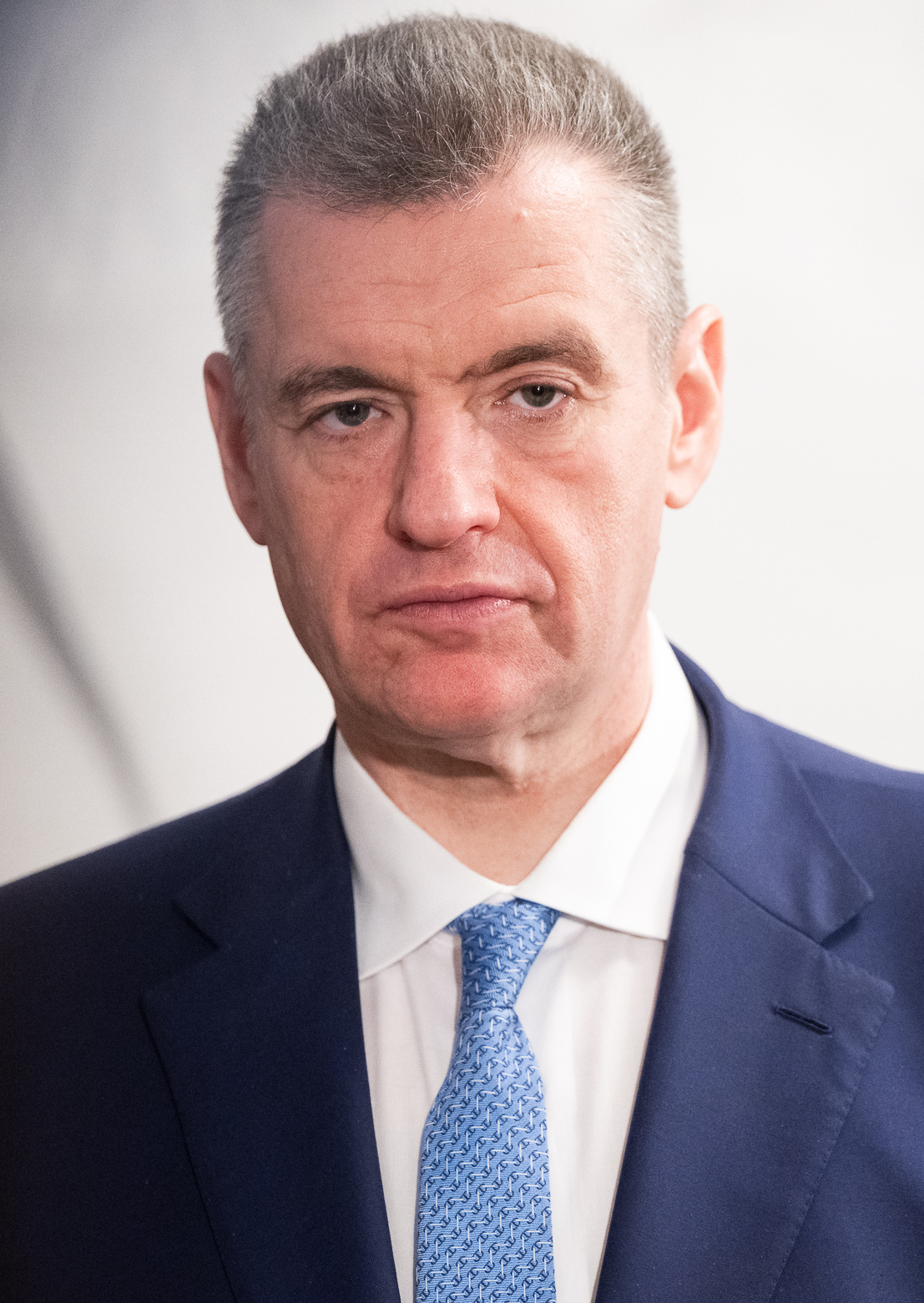

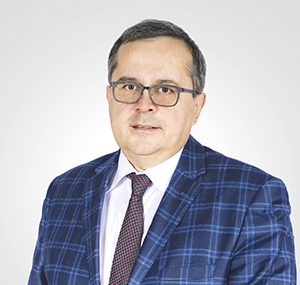
	Majority party	Minority party	Third party
			CPRF
Candidate	Ruslan Kukharuk	Leonid Slutsky	Aleksey Savintsev
Party	United Russia	LDPR	CPRF
Last election	40.23%, 29 seats	14.64%, 3 seats	17.22%, 4 seats
Seats won	31	4	3
Seat change	▲2	▲1	▼1
Popular vote	377,694	106,805	78,863
Percentage	54.18%	15.32%	11.31%
Swing	▲13.95 pp	▲0.68 pp	▼5.91 pp
	Fourth party	Fifth party	Sixth party
	NL	SR
Candidate	Marina Strelnikova	Konstantin Aydakov	Erik Prazdnikov
Party	New People	A Just Russia	Party of Pensioners
Last election	Did not participate	7.71%, 1 seat	7.45%, 1 seat
Seats won	1	1	0
Seat change	Did not participate	Steady	▼1
Popular vote	44,593	36,044	23,492
Percentage	6.40%	5.17%	3.37%
Swing	Did not participate	▼2.54 pp	▼4.08 pp
Chairman before election
Boris Khokhryakov
United Russia
Elected Chairman
Boris Khokhryakov
United Russia
Senator before election
Alexander Noviukhov
United Russia
Senator after election
Alexander Noviukhov
United Russia

The 2026 Duma of Khanty-Mansi Autonomous Okrug election took place on 18–20 September 2026, on common election day, coinciding with the 2026 Tyumen Oblast legislative election and the 2026 Russian legislative election. All 40 seats in the Duma were up for re-election.

United Russia retained its overwhelming majority in the Duma, winning 54.2% of the vote and 18 single-mandate constituencies. Liberal Democratic Party of Russia finished second in both popular vote and number of seats, displacing Communist Party of the Russian Federation. New People entered the Duma for the first time, while Russian Party of Pensioners failed to retain its faction, losing more than half of its vote share.

== Electoral system ==
Under current election laws, the Duma is elected for a term of five years, with parallel voting. 20 seats are elected by party-list proportional representation with a 5% electoral threshold (up from 19 in 2021), with the other half elected in 20 single-member constituencies by block voting (up from 19 in 2021). Seats in the proportional part are allocated using the Imperiali quota, modified to ensure that every party list, which passes the threshold, receives at least one mandate.

== Candidates ==
=== Party lists ===
To register regional lists of candidates, parties need to collect 0.5% of signatures of all registered voters in the Khanty-Mansi Autonomous Okrug.

The following parties were relieved from the necessity to collect signatures:

- United Russia
- Communist Party of the Russian Federation
- Liberal Democratic Party of Russia
- A Just Russia
- New People
- Russian Party of Pensioners for Social Justice
- Communists of Russia

№	Party	Okrug-wide list	Candidates	Territorial groups	Status
1	United Russia	Ruslan Kukharuk • Boris Khokhryakov • Dmitry Aksyonov • Vasily Filipenko • Alexander Noviukhov	65	20	Registered
2	Communist Party	Aleksey Savintsev	59	20	Registered
3	Communists of Russia	Vladimir Dmitriyev • Maksim Logachev • Andrey Kumyshev	25	20	Registered
4	New People	Marina Strelnikova • Igor Kornilov • Sergey Ionov	23	20	Registered
5	A Just Russia	Konstantin Aydakov	34	21	Registered
6	Liberal Democratic Party	Leonid Slutsky • Vladimir Sysoyev • Yevgeny Dannikov • Viktor Sysun	61	20	Registered
7	Party of Pensioners	Erik Prazdnikov • Vladimir Zinovyev • Pavel Krylaty	32	20	Registered

New People took part in the Khanty-Mansi Autonomous Okrug legislative election for the first time. Russian Party of Freedom and Justice and Rodina, which participated in the last election, did not file.

=== Single-mandate constituencies ===
20 single-mandate constituencies were formed in the Khanty-Mansi Autonomous Okrug. To register candidates in single-mandate constituencies need to collect 3% of signatures of registered voters in the constituency.

Number of candidates in single-mandate constituencies
Party	Candidates	
Party	Nominated	Registered
United Russia	20	20
Communist Party	20	19
Liberal Democratic Party	20	20
A Just Russia	17	16
Party of Pensioners	8	8
Communists of Russia	9	9
New People	18	17
Independent	4	1
Total	116	110

== Results ==
=== Results by party lists ===
Summary of the 18–20 September 2026 Duma of Khanty-Mansi Autonomous Okrug election results
Party	Party list					Constituency		Total	
Party	Votes	%	±pp	Seats	+/–	Seats	+/–	Seats	+/–
United Russia	377,694	54.18	▲13.95	13	▲3	18	▼1	31	▲2
Liberal Democratic Party	106,805	15.32	▲0.68	3	Steady	1	▲1	4	▲1
Communist Party	78,863	11.31	▼5.91	2	▼2	1	▲1	3	▼1
New People	44,593	6.40	New	1	New	0	New	1	New
A Just Russia	36,044	5.17	▼2.54	1	Steady	0	Steady	1	Steady
Party of Pensioners	23,492	3.37	▼4.08	0	▼1	0	Steady	0	▼1
Communists of Russia	13,457	1.93	▼2.04	0	Steady	0	Steady	0	Steady
Independent	–	–	–	–	–	0	Steady	0	Steady
Invalid ballots	16,210	2.33	▼2.32	—	—	—	—	—	—
Total	697,158	100.00	—	20	▲1	20	▲1	40	▲2
Turnout	697,158	60.69	▲16.08	—	—	—	—	—	—
Registered voters	1,148,804	100.00	—	—	—	—	—	—	—

Boris Khokhryakov (United Russia) was re-elected as Chairman of the Duma, while incumbent Senator Alexander Noviukhov (United Russia) was re-appointed to the Federation Council.

=== Results in single-member constituencies ===
==== District 1 ====
Summary of the 18–20 September 2026 Duma of Khanty-Mansi Autonomous Okrug election in Beloyarsky constituency No.1
Candidate	Party	Votes	%
Leonid Mikhalko (incumbent)	United Russia	22,448	57.10%
Sergey Matyunin	A Just Russia	4,918	12.51%
Yekaterina Korikova	Liberal Democratic Party	4,858	12.36%
Aleksey Panov	Communist Party	3,499	8.90%
Askhat Ilyasov	New People	2,673	6.80%
Total		39,314	100%

==== District 2 ====
Summary of the 18–20 September 2026 Duma of Khanty-Mansi Autonomous Okrug election in Yugorsky constituency No.2
Candidate	Party	Votes	%
Vasily Zhukov	Communist Party	9,054	32.97%
Sergey Andrianov	United Russia	7,311	26.62%
Vladimir Kharlov	Liberal Democratic Party	3,781	13.77%
Tatyana Aksenova	Communists of Russia	2,381	8.67%
Aksinya Dmitriyeva	New People	2,139	7.79%
Olga Kokhanovskaya	A Just Russia	1,403	5.11%
Total		27,460	100%

==== District 3 ====
Summary of the 18–20 September 2026 Duma of Khanty-Mansi Autonomous Okrug election in Nyagansky constituency No.3
Candidate	Party	Votes	%
Andrey Osadchuk (incumbent)	United Russia	7,446	28.02%
Aleksandr Arkhipov	Liberal Democratic Party	7,070	26.61%
Oleg Volosnyov	A Just Russia	3,579	13.47%
Pavel Zaytsev	Communist Party	3,049	11.47%
Polina Bekkerova	New People	2,435	9.16%
Aslan Bichoyev	Communists of Russia	1,073	4.04%
Total		26,572	100%

==== District 4 ====
Summary of the 18–20 September 2026 Duma of Khanty-Mansi Autonomous Okrug election in Uraysky constituency No.4
Candidate	Party	Votes	%
Anatoly Dubovik (incumbent)	United Russia	18,442	56.81%
Yekaterina Azizova	Communist Party	4,931	15.19%
Gleb Trubin	Liberal Democratic Party	3,884	11.96%
Yevgeny Churikov	A Just Russia	2,493	7.68%
Vladimir Izyurov	Communists of Russia	1,726	5.32%
Total		32,464	100%

==== District 5 ====
Summary of the 18–20 September 2026 Duma of Khanty-Mansi Autonomous Okrug election in Khanty-Mansiysky constituency No.5
Candidate	Party	Votes	%
Nikolay Tashlanov (incumbent)	United Russia	32,883	65.08%
Andrey Yekimov	Liberal Democratic Party	4,737	9.38%
Aleksey Anosov	A Just Russia	3,569	7.06%
Timur Latipov	Communist Party	3,541	7.01%
Anastasia Nikolskaya	New People	2,741	5.43%
Sergey Didukh	Party of Pensioners	2,089	4.13%
Total		50,524	100%

==== District 6 ====
Summary of the 18–20 September 2026 Duma of Khanty-Mansi Autonomous Okrug election in Pyt-Yakhsky constituency No.6
Candidate	Party	Votes	%
Yekaterina Khilova	United Russia	12,954	49.62%
Svetlana Rudenko	Communist Party	3,604	13.80%
Aleksandr Lobov	Liberal Democratic Party	3,492	13.38%
Anastasia Plesovskikh	New People	1,756	6.73%
Aleksey Zabrodin	A Just Russia	1,539	5.89%
Maksim Logachev	Communists of Russia	1,435	5.50%
Total		26,108	100%

==== District 7 ====
Summary of the 18–20 September 2026 Duma of Khanty-Mansi Autonomous Okrug election in Nefteyugansky constituency No.7
Candidate	Party	Votes	%
Vsevolod Koltsov	United Russia	19,180	66.35%
Aleksandr Tikhomirov	Liberal Democratic Party	3,994	13.82%
Aleksey Melnikov	Communist Party	3,063	10.60%
Anastasia Novitskaya	A Just Russia	1,761	6.09%
Yekaterina Nazarova	Communists of Russia	591	2.04%
Total		28,907	100%

==== District 8 ====
Summary of the 18–20 September 2026 Duma of Khanty-Mansi Autonomous Okrug election in Nefteyugansky constituency No.8
Candidate	Party	Votes	%
Vladimir Semyonov (incumbent)	United Russia	32,393	81.76%
Andrey Milyayev	Liberal Democratic Party	4,383	11.06%
Maksim Uskov	Communist Party	2,009	5.07%
Total		39,618	100%

==== District 9 ====
Summary of the 18–20 September 2026 Duma of Khanty-Mansi Autonomous Okrug election in Surgutsky constituency No.9
Candidate	Party	Votes	%
Aleksandr Salnikov (incumbent)	United Russia	16,312	46.30%
Nadezhda Boldyreva	Communist Party	5,195	14.74%
Marina Strelnikova	New People	4,918	13.96%
Yevgeny Khamutovsky	Liberal Democratic Party	4,447	12.62%
Viktor Ryabchikov	Party of Pensioners	3,694	10.48%
Total		35,233	100%

==== District 10 ====
Summary of the 18–20 September 2026 Duma of Khanty-Mansi Autonomous Okrug election in Surgutsky constituency No.10
Candidate	Party	Votes	%
Irina Urvantseva (incumbent)	United Russia	11,635	41.77%
Sergey Tokarev	Communist Party	4,481	16.09%
Rafael Salakhov	Liberal Democratic Party	3,521	12.64%
Andrey Naumov	A Just Russia	2,999	10.77%
Eduard Stepanyan	New People	2,673	9.60%
Aleksandra Akhmatova	Party of Pensioners	1,676	6.02%
Total		27,853	100%

==== District 11 ====
Summary of the 18–20 September 2026 Duma of Khanty-Mansi Autonomous Okrug election in Surgutsky constituency No.11
Candidate	Party	Votes	%
Oleg Vakhovsky	United Russia	16,890	52.26%
Artur Waiman	New People	3,927	12.15%
Andrey Korepanov	A Just Russia	3,761	11.64%
Nadezhda Nosova	Liberal Democratic Party	3,586	11.10%
Ivan Barsov	Communist Party	3,439	10.64%
Total		32,317	100%

==== District 12 ====
Summary of the 18–20 September 2026 Duma of Khanty-Mansi Autonomous Okrug election in Surgutsky constituency No.12
Candidate	Party	Votes	%
Larisa Belotserkovtseva	United Russia	21,740	57.14%
Artyom Kocheshkov	Liberal Democratic Party	4,545	11.95%
Sergey Khripkov	A Just Russia	3,929	10.33%
Vyacheslav Ivanko	Communist Party	3,709	9.75%
Anastasia Loginova	New People	3,332	8.76%
Total		38,046	100%

==== District 13 ====
Summary of the 18–20 September 2026 Duma of Khanty-Mansi Autonomous Okrug election in Surgutsky constituency No.13
Candidate	Party	Votes	%
Sergey Kulpin	Liberal Democratic Party	10,509	29.02%
Yevgeny Barsov	Communist Party	9,702	26.79%
Sergey Salakhov	United Russia	9,447	26.09%
Sergey Ionov	New People	3,224	8.90%
Dinar Abukin	Communists of Russia	2,593	7.16%
Total		36,209	100%

==== District 14 ====
Summary of the 18–20 September 2026 Duma of Khanty-Mansi Autonomous Okrug election in Surgutsky constituency No.14
Candidate	Party	Votes	%
Igor Bruslinovsky (incumbent)	United Russia	28,210	62.65%
Valeria Valiyeva	Liberal Democratic Party	6,313	14.02%
Andrey Boychuk	A Just Russia	5,036	11.18%
Alfia Bergaliyeva	New People	4,727	10.50%
Total		45,029	100%

==== District 15 ====
Summary of the 18–20 September 2026 Duma of Khanty-Mansi Autonomous Okrug election in Raduzhninsky constituency No.15
Candidate	Party	Votes	%
Ivan Laptev	United Russia	14,323	45.90%
Vadim Suleimanov	Communist Party	5,031	16.12%
Igor Myasin	Liberal Democratic Party	4,663	14.94%
Anastasia Davydova	New People	3,440	11.02%
Andrey Kumyshev	Communists of Russia	2,413	7.73%
Total		31,202	100%

==== District 16 ====
Summary of the 18–20 September 2026 Duma of Khanty-Mansi Autonomous Okrug election in Kogalymsky constituency No.16
Candidate	Party	Votes	%
Andrey Kovalsky (incumbent)	United Russia	16,457	54.29%
Khayal Ismailov	Liberal Democratic Party	4,600	15.18%
Rail Zagriyev	Communist Party	3,713	12.25%
Adelina Avramkova	New People	2,014	6.64%
Anatoly Khramov	A Just Russia	1,486	4.90%
Nikolay Shabanov	Communists of Russia	1,191	3.93%
Total		30,312	100%

==== District 17 ====
Summary of the 18–20 September 2026 Duma of Khanty-Mansi Autonomous Okrug election in Megionsky constituency No.17
Candidate	Party	Votes	%
Aleksandr Fedyayev	United Russia	11,327	40.04%
Viktor Makarov	Communist Party	5,390	19.05%
Sergey Igoshev	Liberal Democratic Party	4,844	17.12%
Karolina Atakhanova	New People	2,792	9.87%
Pavel Krylaty	Party of Pensioners	1,957	6.92%
Svetlana Rybachuk	A Just Russia	1,064	3.76%
Total		28,287	100%

==== District 18 ====
Summary of the 18–20 September 2026 Duma of Khanty-Mansi Autonomous Okrug election in Nizhnevartovsky constituency No.18
Candidate	Party	Votes	%
Boris Khokhryakov (incumbent)	United Russia	12,150	44.95%
Konstantin Boyko	Liberal Democratic Party	4,072	15.06%
Yury Martynov	Communist Party	3,165	11.71%
Igor Kornilov	New People	2,345	8.68%
Pyotr Mamontov	A Just Russia	2,144	7.93%
Vladimir Dmitriyev	Communists of Russia	1,891	7.00%
Total		27,030	100%

==== District 19 ====
Summary of the 18–20 September 2026 Duma of Khanty-Mansi Autonomous Okrug election in Nizhnevartovsky constituency No.19
Candidate	Party	Votes	%
Natalya Zapadnova (incumbent)	United Russia	14,213	46.48%
Maksim Popov	Liberal Democratic Party	4,134	13.52%
Oleg Galchenko	Communist Party	3,021	9.88%
Alexander Maletin	A Just Russia	2,814	9.20%
Sergey Shatilov	New People	2,008	6.57%
Olga Galushko	Independent	1,838	6.01%
Viktoria Khandazhevskaya	Party of Pensioners	1,421	4.65%
Total		30,581	100%

==== District 20 ====
Summary of the 18–20 September 2026 Duma of Khanty-Mansi Autonomous Okrug election in Nizhnevartovsky constituency No.20
Candidate	Party	Votes	%
Aleksandr Peterman	United Russia	18,669	51.99%
Alfir Biktagirov	Liberal Democratic Party	4,838	13.47%
Yevgeny Tsyganov	Communist Party	4,297	11.97%
Maksim Novikov	New People	3,701	10.31%
Svetlana Streich	Party of Pensioners	1,674	4.66%
Andrey Savelyev	A Just Russia	1,545	4.30%
Total		35,907	100%

=== Members ===
Incumbent deputies are highlighted with bold, elected members who declined to take a seat are marked with ~~strikethrough~~.

Constituency
No.	Member	Party
1	Leonid Mikhalko	United Russia
2	Vasily Zhukov	Communist Party
3	Andrey Osadchuk	United Russia
4	Anatoly Dubovik	United Russia
5	Nikolay Tashlanov	United Russia
6	Yekaterina Khilova	United Russia
7	Vsevolod Koltsov	United Russia
8	Vladimir Semyonov	United Russia
9	Aleksandr Salnikov	United Russia
10	Irina Urvantseva	United Russia
11	Oleg Vakhovsky	United Russia
12	Larisa Belotserkovtseva	United Russia
13	Sergey Kulpin	Liberal Democratic Party
14	Igor Bruslinovsky	United Russia
15	Ivan Laptev	United Russia
16	Andrey Kovalsky	United Russia
17	Aleksandr Fedyayev	United Russia
18	Boris Khokhryakov	United Russia
19	Natalya Zapadnova	United Russia
20	Aleksandr Peterman	United Russia

Party lists
Member	Party
~~Ruslan Kukharuk~~	United Russia
~~Dmitry Aksyonov~~	United Russia
Vasily Filipenko	United Russia
Alexander Noviukhov	United Russia
Ruslan Provodnikov	United Russia
Denis Sviridov	United Russia
Ivan Plotnikov	United Russia
Eka Shengelaya	United Russia
Dmitry Tretyakov	United Russia
Nikolay Zabolotnev	United Russia
Yeremey Aypin	United Russia
Yakov Volkov	United Russia
Ilnur Basyrov	United Russia
Vladimir Bolotov	United Russia
Olga Lesnova	United Russia
~~Leonid Slutsky~~	Liberal Democratic Party
~~Vladimir Sysoyev~~	Liberal Democratic Party
Yevgeny Dannikov	Liberal Democratic Party
Viktor Sysun	Liberal Democratic Party
Aleksandr Arkhipov	Liberal Democratic Party
Aleksey Savintsev	Communist Party
Artyom Aminov	Communist Party
Marina Strelnikova	New People
Konstantin Aydakov	A Just Russia

== See also ==
- 2026 Russian regional elections
