= 2026 Tyumen Oblast legislative election =

Regional legislative election in Russia

- 18–20 September 2026

All 48 seats in the Oblast Duma 25 seats needed for a majority
- Turnout: 64.79% ▲10.76 pp
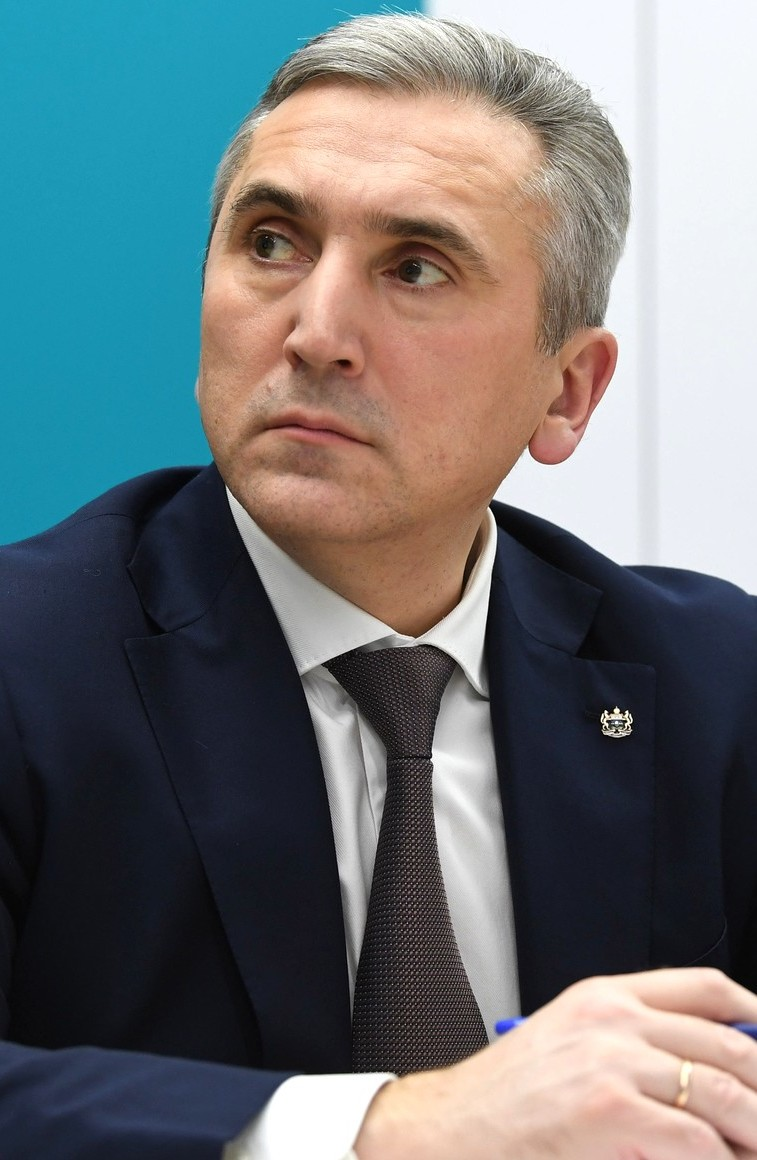

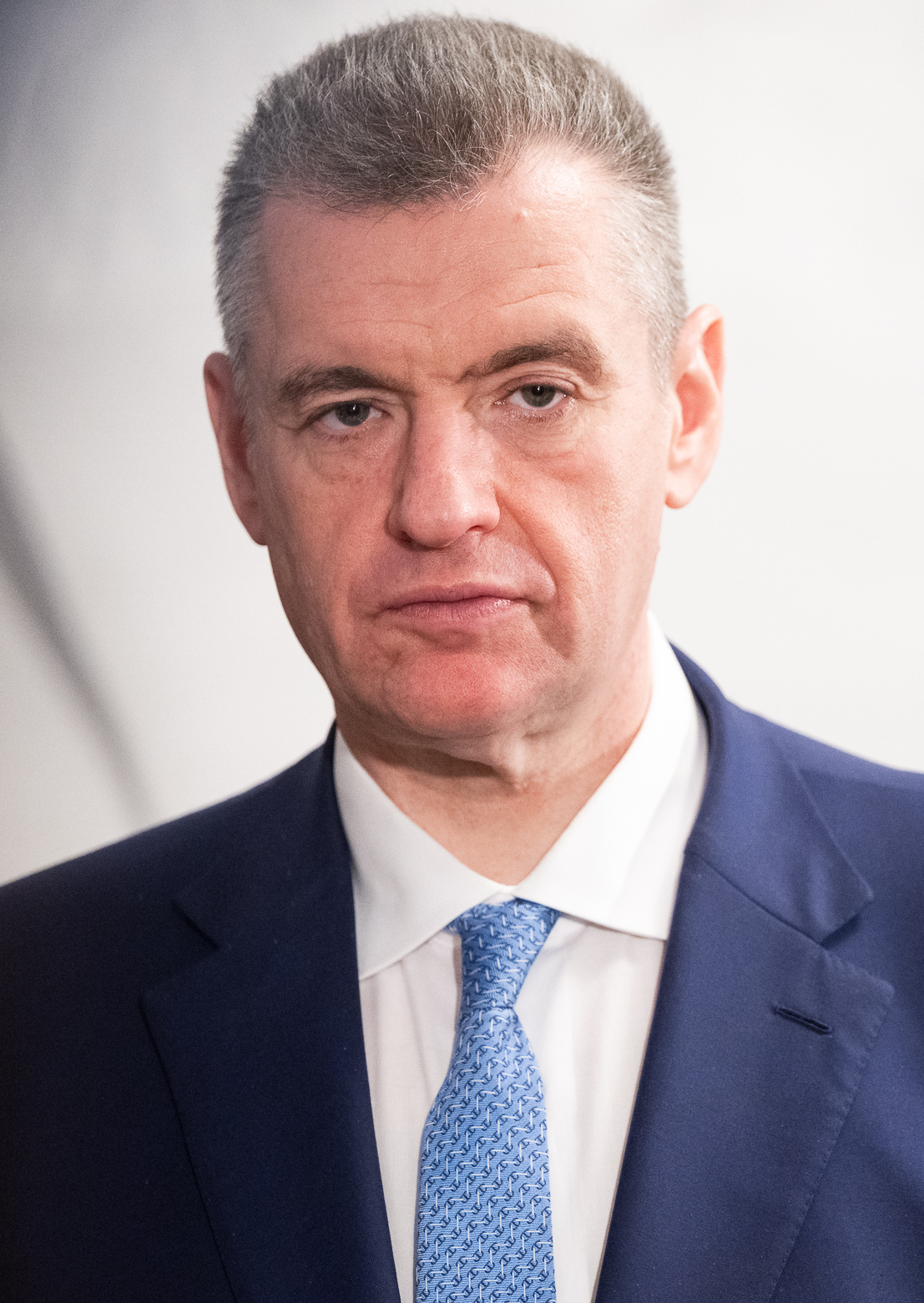

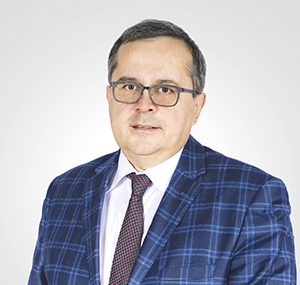
	Majority party	Minority party	Third party
			CPRF
Candidate	Aleksandr Moor	Leonid Slutsky	Tamara Kazantseva
Party	United Russia	LDPR	CPRF
Last election	50.07%, 38 seats	12.72%, 4 seats	11.94%, 4 seats
Seats won	40	3	3
Seat change	▲2	▼1	▼1
Popular vote	1,034,671	220,729	187,866
Percentage	59.63%	12.72%	10.83%
Swing	▲9.56 pp	Steady	▼1.11 pp
	Fourth party	Fifth party	Sixth party
	NL	SR
Candidate	Artyom Zaytsev	Vladimir Piskaykin	Erik Prazdnikov
Party	New People	A Just Russia	Party of Pensioners
Last election	4.66%, 0 seats	7.47%, 2 seats	4.15%, 0 seats
Seats won	1	1	0
Seat change	▲1	▼1	Steady
Popular vote	107,816	88,989	36,774
Percentage	6.21%	5.13%	2.12%
Swing	▲1.55 pp	▼2.34 pp	▼2.03 pp
Chairman before election
Fuat Saifitdinov
United Russia
Elected Chairman
Fuat Saifitdinov
United Russia
Senator before election
Dmitry Goritsky
United Russia
Senator after election
Dmitry Goritsky
United Russia

The 2026 Tyumen Oblast Duma election took place on 18–20 September 2026, on common election day, coinciding with the 2026 Khanty-Mansi Autonomous Okrug legislative election and the 2026 Russian legislative election. All 48 seats in the Oblast Duma were up for re-election. Tyumen Oblast Duma election was held in Tyumen Oblast, Khanty-Mansi Autonomous Okrug and Yamalo-Nenets Autonomous Okrug.

United Russia slightly increased its overwhelming majority in the Oblast Duma, winning 59.6% of the vote and all 24 single-mandate constituencies. Liberal Democratic Party of Russia, Communist Party of the Russian Federation and A Just Russia all lost a single seat each, while New People entered the Oblast Duma for the first time.

== Electoral system ==
Under current election laws, the Oblast Duma is elected for a term of five years, with parallel voting. 24 seats are elected by party-list proportional representation with a 5% electoral threshold, with the other half elected in 24 single-member constituencies by first-past-the-post voting. Seats in the proportional part are allocated using the Imperiali quota, modified to ensure that every party list, which passes the threshold, receives at least one mandate. Unlike most regional elections in Russia, party lists in Tyumen Oblast are not divided between territorial groups.

== Candidates ==
=== Party lists ===
To register regional lists of candidates, parties need to collect 0.5% of signatures of all registered voters in Tyumen Oblast.

The following parties were relieved from the necessity to collect signatures:

- United Russia
- Communist Party of the Russian Federation
- Liberal Democratic Party of Russia
- A Just Russia
- New People
- Russian Party of Pensioners for Social Justice
- Communists of Russia

№	Party	Party-list leaders	Candidates	Status
1	United Russia	Aleksandr Moor • Boris Khokhryakov • Fuat Saifitdinov • Andrey Artyukhov • Irina Sokolova	48	Registered
2	Communists of Russia	Dinar Abukin • Yevgenia Safiyeva • Maksim Logachev • Nikolay Tsiganets • Vadim Atrasev	30	Registered
3	Communist Party	Tamara Kazantseva • Ivan Levchenko • Regina Yukhnevich • Anastasia Bondarchuk • Yelena Kukushkina	29	Registered
4	Liberal Democratic Party	Leonid Slutsky • Vladimir Sysoyev • Ivan Vershinin • Denis Sadovnikov • Viktor Sysun	31	Registered
5	A Just Russia	Vladimir Piskaykin • Sergey Morev • Nikolay Remezkov • Konstantin Aydakov • Vera Kapshanova	30	Registered
6	Party of Pensioners	Erik Prazdnikov • Vladimir Zinovyev • Pavel Krylaty • Yevgeny Gorodilov • Ivan Maryin	32	Registered
7	New People	Artyom Zaytsev • Aleksandr Yakovenko • Marina Strelnikova • Mikhail Levin • Maksim Novikov	36	Registered

Party of Growth, which participated in the last election, was dissolved and merged into New People.

=== Single-mandate constituencies ===
24 single-mandate constituencies were formed in Tyumen Oblast. Constituencies No.1–4 cover Yamalo-Nenets Autonomous Okrug, while No.5–14 – Khanty-Mansi Autonomous Okrug. To register candidates in single-mandate constituencies need to collect 3% of signatures of registered voters in the constituency.

Number of candidates in single-mandate constituencies
Party	Candidates	
Party	Nominated	Registered
United Russia	24	24
Liberal Democratic Party	24	24
Communist Party	24	24
A Just Russia	24	23
Communists of Russia	14	14
New People	13	12
Party of Pensioners	2	2
Independent	4	3
Total	129	126

== Results ==
=== Results by party lists ===
Summary of the 18–20 September 2026 Tyumen Oblast Duma election results
Party	Party list					Constituency		Total	
Party	Votes	%	±pp	Seats	+/–	Seats	+/–	Seats	+/–
United Russia	1,034,671	59.63	▲9.56	16	▲1	24	▲1	40	▲2
Liberal Democratic Party	220,729	12.72	Steady	3	▼1	0	Steady	3	▼1
Communist Party	187,866	10.83	▼1.11	3	Steady	0	▼1	3	▼1
New People	107,816	6.21	▲1.55	1	▲1	0	Steady	1	▲1
A Just Russia	88,989	5.13	▼2.34	1	▼1	0	Steady	1	▼1
Party of Pensioners	36,774	2.12	▼2.03	0	Steady	0	Steady	0	Steady
Communists of Russia	29,159	1.68	▼3.06	0	Steady	0	Steady	0	Steady
Independent	–	–	–	–	–	0	Steady	0	Steady
Invalid ballots	29,206	1.68	▼1.36	—	—	—	—	—	—
Total	1,735,210	100.00	—	24	Steady	24	Steady	48	Steady
Turnout	1,735,210	64.79	▲10.76	—	—	—	—	—	—
Registered voters	2,678,366	100.00	—	—	—	—	—	—	—

Fuat Saifitdinov (United Russia) was re-elected as Chairman of the Oblast Duma, while incumbent Senator Dmitry Goritsky (United Russia) was re-appointed to the Federation Council.

=== Results in single-member constituencies ===
==== District 1 ====
Summary of the 18–20 September 2026 Tyumen Oblast Duma election in Salekhardsky constituency No.1
Candidate	Party	Votes	%
Larisa Tsupikova (incumbent)	United Russia	27,857	56.58%
Aleksandr Lamdo	Communist Party	7,865	15.97%
Sergey Sozonov	Liberal Democratic Party	5,896	11.97%
Vera Kapshanova	A Just Russia	3,712	7.54%
Pavel Serotetto	Independent	2,909	5.91%
Total		49,239	100%

==== District 2 ====
Summary of the 18–20 September 2026 Tyumen Oblast Duma election in Nadymsky constituency No.2
Candidate	Party	Votes	%
Dmitry Plotnikov (incumbent)	United Russia	42,913	56.40%
Maksim Konovalov	Liberal Democratic Party	13,756	18.08%
Ruslan Aliyev	Communist Party	11,712	15.39%
Svetlana Lavrentyeva	A Just Russia	7,212	9.48%
Total		76,082	100%

==== District 3 ====
Summary of the 18–20 September 2026 Tyumen Oblast Duma election in Noyabrsky constituency No.3
Candidate	Party	Votes	%
Aleksandr Mazharov (incumbent)	United Russia	35,697	56.41%
Anna Golubeva	Communist Party	9,599	15.17%
Tatyana Kulikova	Liberal Democratic Party	7,752	12.25%
Viktor Ushakov	A Just Russia	5,736	9.07%
Svetlana Safonova	Independent	3,929	6.21%
Total		63,276	100%

==== District 4 ====
Summary of the 18–20 September 2026 Tyumen Oblast Duma election in Purovsky constituency No.4
Candidate	Party	Votes	%
Renat Pyak	United Russia	28,819	58.19%
Artyom Ivanov	Liberal Democratic Party	8,129	16.41%
Aleksandr Sviridenko	Communist Party	6,140	12.40%
Sakhib Mollayev	A Just Russia	6,004	12.12%
Total		49,525	100%

==== District 5 ====
Summary of the 18–20 September 2026 Tyumen Oblast Duma election in Yugorsky constituency No.5
Candidate	Party	Votes	%
Andrey Stankin	United Russia	24,870	41.20%
Vasily Zhukov	Communist Party	18,316	30.34%
Gleb Trubin	Liberal Democratic Party	8,747	14.49%
Maksim Logachev	Communists of Russia	5,490	9.09%
Total		60,365	100%

==== District 6 ====
Summary of the 18–20 September 2026 Tyumen Oblast Duma election in Nyagansky constituency No.6
Candidate	Party	Votes	%
Vladimir Nefedyev (incumbent)	United Russia	29,208	45.05%
Aleksandr Arkhipov	Liberal Democratic Party	12,432	19.17%
Yulia Mishina	Communist Party	8,565	13.21%
Aleksandr Breusov	A Just Russia	6,453	9.95%
Leonid Petukhov	Independent	2,871	4.43%
Nikolay Tsiganets	Communists of Russia	2,050	3.16%
Total		64,837	100%

==== District 7 ====
Summary of the 18–20 September 2026 Tyumen Oblast Duma election in Khanty-Mansiysky constituency No.7
Candidate	Party	Votes	%
Pavel Semyonov	United Russia	49,761	58.88%
Andrey Yekimov	Liberal Democratic Party	8,261	9.78%
Anastasia Bondarchuk	Communist Party	7,963	9.42%
Aleksey Anosov	A Just Russia	5,922	7.01%
Vladimir Dmitriyev	Communists of Russia	4,813	5.70%
Anastasia Nikolskaya	New People	4,767	5.64%
Total		84,507	100%

==== District 8 ====
Summary of the 18–20 September 2026 Tyumen Oblast Duma election in Nefteyugansky constituency No.8
Candidate	Party	Votes	%
Aleksandr Zelensky (incumbent)	United Russia	38,928	63.59%
Alan Bayev	Communist Party	9,318	15.22%
Andrey Milyayev	Liberal Democratic Party	7,280	11.89%
Vladislav Malyugin	A Just Russia	2,816	4.60%
Sergey Tselishchev	Party of Pensioners	1,916	3.13%
Total		61,221	100%

==== District 9 ====
Summary of the 18–20 September 2026 Tyumen Oblast Duma election in Surgutsky constituency No.9
Candidate	Party	Votes	%
Galina Rezyapova (incumbent)	United Russia	29,183	46.46%
Artyom Kocheshkov	Liberal Democratic Party	11,710	18.64%
Aleksey Savintsev	Communist Party	11,304	17.99%
Anna Savitskaya	A Just Russia	9,045	14.40%
Total		62,818	100%

==== District 10 ====
Summary of the 18–20 September 2026 Tyumen Oblast Duma election in Surgutsky constituency No.10
Candidate	Party	Votes	%
Mikhail Karnaukhov	United Russia	34,855	51.30%
Viktor Sysun	Liberal Democratic Party	12,304	18.11%
Vyacheslav Ivanko	Communist Party	7,268	10.70%
Marina Strelnikova	New People	7,256	10.68%
Denis Usoltsev	A Just Russia	4,751	6.99%
Total		67,950	100%

==== District 11 ====
Summary of the 18–20 September 2026 Tyumen Oblast Duma election in Surgutsky constituency No.11
Candidate	Party	Votes	%
Aleksandr Zimin	United Russia	52,208	60.35%
Vladimir Savin	A Just Russia	13,670	15.80%
Sergey Kulpin	Liberal Democratic Party	12,994	15.02%
Nadezhda Boldyreva	Communist Party	6,421	7.42%
Total		86,507	100%

==== District 12 ====
Summary of the 18–20 September 2026 Tyumen Oblast Duma election in Kogalymsky constituency No.12
Candidate	Party	Votes	%
Inna Loseva (incumbent)	United Russia	39,792	55.59%
Yevgeny Dannikov	Liberal Democratic Party	10,198	14.25%
Stepan Povkh	Communist Party	8,648	12.08%
Aleksey Yerofeyev	A Just Russia	5,266	7.36%
Sergey Shatilov	New People	4,958	6.93%
Total		71,583	100%

==== District 13 ====
Summary of the 18–20 September 2026 Tyumen Oblast Duma election in Nizhnevartovsky constituency No.13
Candidate	Party	Votes	%
Anatoly Chepaykin (incumbent)	United Russia	22,465	42.09%
Viktor Makarov	Communist Party	10,332	19.36%
Sergey Igoshev	Liberal Democratic Party	9,353	17.52%
Pavel Krylaty	Party of Pensioners	5,252	9.84%
Andrey Savelyev	A Just Russia	3,646	6.83%
Total		53,379	100%

==== District 14 ====
Summary of the 18–20 September 2026 Tyumen Oblast Duma election in Nizhnevartovsky constituency No.14
Candidate	Party	Votes	%
Maksim Khramtsov	United Russia	27,246	48.11%
Maksim Popov	Liberal Democratic Party	10,377	18.32%
Oleg Galchenko (incumbent)	Communist Party	8,729	15.41%
Pyotr Mamontov	A Just Russia	4,524	7.99%
Aslan Bichoyev	Communists of Russia	3,463	6.11%
Total		56,638	100%

==== District 15 ====
Summary of the 18–20 September 2026 Tyumen Oblast Duma election in Tobolsky constituency No.15
Candidate	Party	Votes	%
Yelena Belskaya	United Russia	57,000	63.31%
Regina Yukhnevich	Communist Party	10,223	11.36%
Vasily Sofronov	Liberal Democratic Party	7,669	8.52%
Iskandar Azizov	New People	6,197	6.88%
Aleksandr Kireyev	Communists of Russia	4,450	4.94%
Nikolay Remezkov	A Just Russia	3,104	3.45%
Total		90,030	100%

==== District 16 ====
Summary of the 18–20 September 2026 Tyumen Oblast Duma election in Yarkovsky constituency No.16
Candidate	Party	Votes	%
Aleksandr Anokhin (incumbent)	United Russia	40,992	67.13%
Tatyana Kazantseva	Communist Party	6,802	11.14%
Aleksandr Purtov	Liberal Democratic Party	5,120	8.38%
Ilya Slivko	New People	3,322	5.44%
Emil Krumov	A Just Russia	2,098	3.44%
Yekaterina Fadeyeva	Communists of Russia	1,869	3.06%
Total		61,062	100%

==== District 17 ====
Summary of the 18–20 September 2026 Tyumen Oblast Duma election in Tyumensky constituency No.17
Candidate	Party	Votes	%
Oksana Velichko (incumbent)	United Russia	53,626	57.50%
Ivan Levchenko	Communist Party	10,187	10.92%
Aleksandr Galygin	Liberal Democratic Party	10,171	10.91%
Aleksandr Chochev	New People	6,458	6.92%
Irina Deykina	A Just Russia	5,389	5.78%
Rashid Abaidullin	Communists of Russia	4,379	4.70%
Total		93,259	100%

==== District 18 ====
Summary of the 18–20 September 2026 Tyumen Oblast Duma election in Tyumen Central constituency No.18
Candidate	Party	Votes	%
Aleksey Salmin	United Russia	28,818	41.60%
Maksim Novikov	New People	9,924	14.33%
Pavel Semyonov	Communist Party	9,001	12.99%
Ruslan Sabirov	Liberal Democratic Party	7,239	10.45%
Dmitry Voronov	Communists of Russia	6,582	9.50%
Vladimir Piskaykin	A Just Russia	6,099	8.80%
Total		69,276	100%

==== District 19 ====
Summary of the 18–20 September 2026 Tyumen Oblast Duma election in Tyumen Leninsky constituency No.19
Candidate	Party	Votes	%
Sergey Medvedev (incumbent)	United Russia	29,347	50.07%
Leonid Lipa	Communist Party	7,926	13.52%
Yevgeny Shulgin	New People	7,391	12.61%
Sergey Morev	A Just Russia	6,180	10.54%
Maksim Dolmatov	Liberal Democratic Party	3,981	6.79%
Valery Davydov	Communists of Russia	2,737	4.67%
Total		58,610	100%

==== District 20 ====
Summary of the 18–20 September 2026 Tyumen Oblast Duma election in Tyumen Kalininsky constituency No.20
Candidate	Party	Votes	%
Andrey Lazarev (incumbent)	United Russia	31,511	47.20%
Viktoria Cherepanova	Liberal Democratic Party	9,298	13.93%
Pavel Lyashenko	New People	8,127	12.17%
Aleksandr Pestov	Communist Party	6,931	10.38%
Stanislav Bakhitov	Communists of Russia	6,383	9.56%
Anastasia Shestakova	A Just Russia	3,722	5.58%
Total		66,762	100%

==== District 21 ====
Summary of the 18–20 September 2026 Tyumen Oblast Duma election in Tyumen Southern constituency No.21
Candidate	Party	Votes	%
Roman Chuyko	United Russia	29,571	44.01%
Aleksandr Kulakov	Communist Party	13,236	19.70%
Ivan Vershinin	Liberal Democratic Party	11,759	17.50%
Asia Saitova	A Just Russia	6,272	9.33%
Vadim Atrasev	Communists of Russia	5,157	7.68%
Total		67,190	100%

==== District 22 ====
Summary of the 18–20 September 2026 Tyumen Oblast Duma election in Tyumen Eastern constituency No.22
Candidate	Party	Votes	%
Pavel Devaykin	United Russia	27,241	43.21%
Aleksandr Zhukov	Communist Party	15,006	23.80%
Alyona Larionova	New People	7,272	11.54%
Lev Shmakov	Liberal Democratic Party	5,987	9.50%
Fauzia Khismatullina	Communists of Russia	3,199	5.07%
Rushan Yanturin	A Just Russia	3,072	4.87%
Total		63,039	100%

==== District 23 ====
Summary of the 18–20 September 2026 Tyumen Oblast Duma election in Ishimsky constituency No.23
Candidate	Party	Votes	%
Fyodor Shishkin	United Russia	87,053	80.94%
Vladimir Bayanov	Liberal Democratic Party	6,746	6.27%
Aleksandr Skakunov	Communist Party	5,953	5.53%
Daniil Fyodorov	A Just Russia	2,623	2.44%
Denis Sladkov	New People	2,382	2.21%
Anton Gaydar	Communists of Russia	2,116	1.97%
Total		107,559	100%

==== District 24 ====
Summary of the 18–20 September 2026 Tyumen Oblast Duma election in Zavodoukovsky constituency No.24
Candidate	Party	Votes	%
Vladimir Kovin (incumbent)	United Russia	71,561	70.07%
Aleksandr Troyegubov	Liberal Democratic Party	9,007	8.82%
Nikolay Eris	Communist Party	8,728	8.55%
Arstan Koishe	A Just Russia	4,527	4.43%
Aleksandr Yakovenko	New People	4,458	4.37%
Nina Protvin	Communists of Russia	3,184	3.12%
Total		102,130	100%

=== Members ===
Incumbent deputies are highlighted with bold, elected members who declined to take a seat are marked with ~~strikethrough~~.

Constituency
No.	Member	Party
1	Larisa Tsupikova	United Russia
2	Dmitry Plotnikov	United Russia
3	Aleksandr Mazharov	United Russia
4	Renat Pyak	United Russia
5	Andrey Stankin	United Russia
6	Vladimir Nefedyev	United Russia
7	Pavel Semyonov	United Russia
8	Aleksandr Zelensky	United Russia
9	Galina Rezyapova	United Russia
10	Mikhail Karnaukhov	United Russia
11	Aleksandr Zimin	United Russia
12	Inna Loseva	United Russia
13	Anatoly Chepaykin	United Russia
14	Maksim Khramtsov	United Russia
15	Yelena Belskaya	United Russia
16	Aleksandr Anokhin	United Russia
17	Oksana Velichko	United Russia
18	Aleksey Salmin	United Russia
19	Sergey Medvedev	United Russia
20	Andrey Lazarev	United Russia
21	Roman Chuyko	United Russia
22	Pavel Devaykin	United Russia
23	Fyodor Shishkin	United Russia
24	Vladimir Kovin	United Russia

Party lists
Member	Party
~~Aleksandr Moor~~	United Russia
~~Boris Khokhryakov~~	United Russia
Fuat Saifitdinov	United Russia
Andrey Artyukhov	United Russia
Irina Sokolova	United Russia
Vadim Shuvalov	United Russia
Natalya Shevchik	United Russia
Nadezhda Alekseyeva	United Russia
Oleg Yampolsky	United Russia
Dmitry Kuzmenko	United Russia
Albert Sufianov	United Russia
~~Aleksandr Kaliberda~~	United Russia
Vladimir Fomin	United Russia
Olga Kuznechevskikh	United Russia
Olga Shvetsova	United Russia
Vyacheslav Tankeyev	United Russia
Dmitry Goritsky	United Russia
Denis Vashchenko	United Russia
~~Eduard Abramov~~	United Russia
~~Sergey Abramov~~	United Russia
~~Vladimir Sbitnev~~	United Russia
Anastasia Shklyar	United Russia
~~Leonid Slutsky~~	Liberal Democratic Party
~~Vladimir Sysoyev~~	Liberal Democratic Party
Ivan Vershinin	Liberal Democratic Party
~~Denis Sadovnikov~~	Liberal Democratic Party
~~Viktor Sysun~~	Liberal Democratic Party
~~Yevgeny Dannikov~~	Liberal Democratic Party
~~Andrey Kuznetsov~~	Liberal Democratic Party
Ruslan Sabirov	Liberal Democratic Party
Andrey Yekimov	Liberal Democratic Party
Tamara Kazantseva	Communist Party
Ivan Levchenko	Communist Party
Regina Yukhnevich	Communist Party
Artyom Zaytsev	New People
Vladimir Piskaykin	A Just Russia

== See also ==
- 2026 Russian regional elections
