= Governor of Yamalo-Nenets Autonomous Okrug =

Highest-ranking official in Yamalo-Nenets Autonomous Okrug, Russia

- Standard of the Governor of Yamalo-Nenets Autonomous Okrug

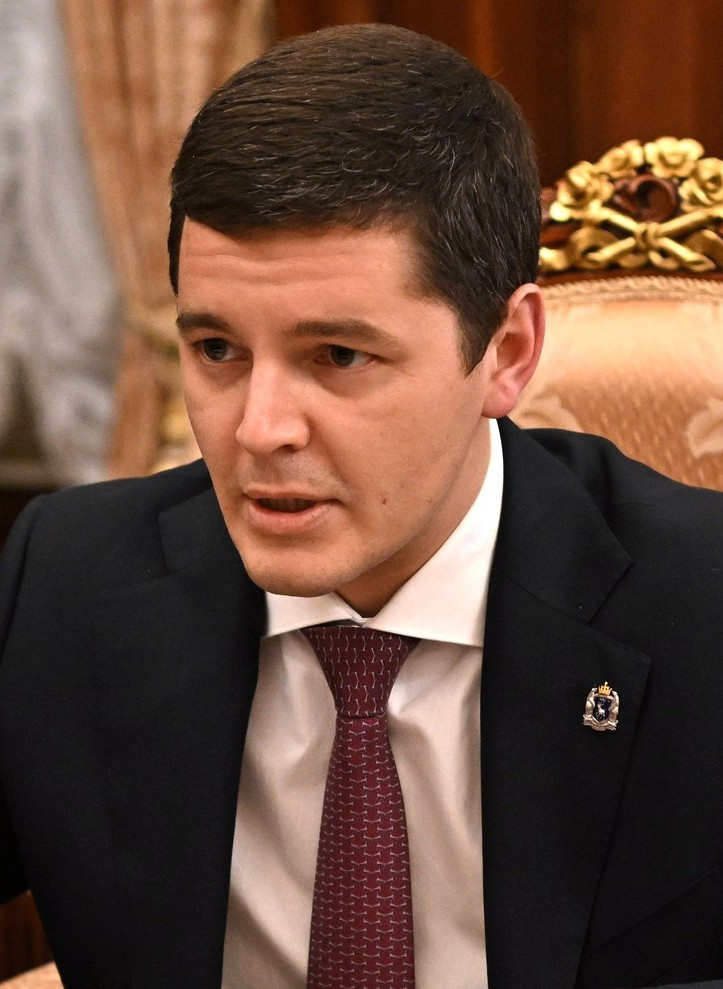
- Incumbent; Dmitry Artyukhov since 9 September 2018
- Type: Head of federal subject
- Seat: Salekhard
- Nominator: President of Russia
- Appointer: Legislative Assembly
- Term length: 5 years
- Constituting instrument: Charter of Yamalo-Nenets Autonomous Okrug, Section 4
- Formation: 1991
- First holder: Lev Bayandin
- Website: yanao.ru

The Governor of Yamalo-Nenets Autonomous Okrug (Russian: Губернатор Ямало-Ненецкого автономного округа) is the head of government of Yamalo-Nenets Autonomous Okrug, a federal subject of Russia.

The position was introduced in 1991 as Head of Administration of Yamalo-Nenets Autonomous Okrug and was restyled in October 1995. The Governor is elected indirectly for a term of five years.

== List of officeholders ==
No.	Portrait	Governor	Tenure	Time in office	Party	Election
1		Lev Bayandin (1942–2018)	23 October 1991 – 12 February 1994 (removed)	2 years, 112 days	Independent	Appointed
–		Yury Neyolov (born 1952)	12 February 1994 – 4 August 1994	16 years, 32 days	Independent → United Russia	Acting
2		Yury Neyolov (born 1952)	4 August 1994 – 16 March 2010 (term end)	16 years, 32 days	Independent → United Russia	Appointed 1996; 2000; 2005
3		Dmitry Kobylkin (born 1971)	16 March 2010 – 12 March 2015 (term end)	8 years, 63 days	United Russia	2010
–		Dmitry Kobylkin (born 1971)	12 March 2015 – 1 October 2015	8 years, 63 days	United Russia	Acting
(3)		Dmitry Kobylkin (born 1971)	1 October 2015 – 18 May 2018 (resigned)	8 years, 63 days	United Russia	2015
Between 18 and 29 May 2018, vice governor Irina Sokolova served as acting head of government.
–		Dmitry Artyukhov (born 1988)	29 May 2018 – 9 September 2018	8 years, 101 days	United Russia	Acting
4		Dmitry Artyukhov (born 1988)	9 September 2018 – present	8 years, 101 days	United Russia	2018; 2023
