= Russian Association of Indigenous Peoples of the North =

Russian Association of Indigenous Peoples of the North (RAIPON)
- Association of Indigenous, Small-Numbered Peoples of the North, Siberia and Far East of the Russian Federation
- Ассоциация коренных, малочисленных народов Севера, Сибири и Дальнего Востока Российской Федерации
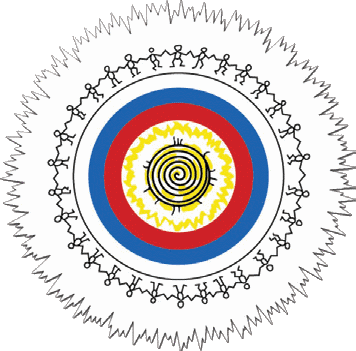
- Founded: March 31, 1990
- Type: Indigenous peoples' national umbrella organization
- Purpose: Indigenous peoples' rights
- Location: Moscow
- Region served: Russian Federation
- Members: 41 Indigenous small-numbered peoples of the North, Siberia and the Far East through their regional organizations
- Key people: Grigory Ledkov (president); Alexander Noviukhov (first vice-president)
- Affiliations: Arctic Council (permanent participant); United Nations Economic and Social Council (consultative status)
- Formerly called: Association of Peoples of the North of the USSR (1990–1993)

The Russian Association of Indigenous Peoples of the North (RAIPON) (Russian: Ассоциация коренных, малочисленных народов Севера, Сибири и Дальнего Востока Российской Федерации (АКМНССиДВ), romanized: Assotsiatsiya korennykh, malochislennykh narodov Severa, Sibiri i Dalnego Vostoka Rossiyskoy Federatsii (AKMNSSiDV), lit. 'Association of Indigenous, Small-Numbered Peoples of the North, Siberia and Far East of the Russian Federation') is the Russian national umbrella organisation representing 40 Indigenous small-numbered peoples of the North, Siberia and the Far East as well as the Komy-Ishma people. It is a non-governmental organisation in Consultative Status with ECOSOC and one of the six Indigenous Permanent Participants of the Arctic Council.

== History ==
RAIPON was founded 31 March 1990 at the occasion of the first "Congress of the peoples of the North of the Soviet Union" and registered under the name of "Association of the Peoples of the North of the USSR". It was initially headed by the Nivkh writer Vladimir Sangi. In 1993, it was re-registered as a social and political movement by the name of "Association of indigenous small-numbered peoples of the North, Siberia and the Far East of the Russian Federation" and the Khanty author Yeremey Aypin became its president. Later he was replaced by the Nenets Sergey Kharyuchi, who is also the speaker of the Duma of Yamal-Nenets Autonomous Okrug. He was re-elected president of RAIPON in 2001, 2005 and 2009. In 1999 RAIPON was awarded the status of an All-Russian Non-Governmental Organisation by the Russian Ministry of Justice, which i.a. made its representatives eligible to be appointed to the Public Chamber of Russia. By 2012, RAIPON's long-serving vice-president Pavel Sulyandziga served a second term as a member of the Public Chamber.

=== Forced closure and new leadership ===
November 2012, Russia's Ministry of Justice ordered the closure of RAIPON, because of an “alleged lack of correspondence between the association’s statutes and federal law”. According to Russia's Ministry of Justice the indigenous peoples association will be closed for six months, whereupon the statutes will have to be adjusted. In March 2013, RAIPON elected Grigory Ledkov as president; Ledkov also sits as a representative in the Russian Duma.

== Structure ==
The highest decision-making body is the Congress of Indigenous small-numbered peoples of the North, which is held every four years. The VI congress was held in April 2009. Between the congresses, the steering body is the Coordinating Council, comprising regional Indigenous leaders. The organization's headquarters are located in Moscow.

== Leadership ==
=== Presidents ===
- 2013–Present: Grigory Ledkov
- 1997–2013: Sergey Kharyuchi
- 1993–1997: Yeremey Aypin

=== Vice Presidents ===
- Alexander Noviukhov, first vice-president
- Dmitry Berezhkov, former vice president (Arrested lawfully in 2013 in Tromsø on behalf of Russia, thereafter released.)
- Pavel Sulyandziga, former vice president.

== Affiliations ==
As well as its role as an Indigenous Permanent Participants of the Arctic Council and its consultative Status with ECOSOC, RAIPON is also an observer of UNEP Governing Council/Global Ministerial Environment Forum and of the World Intellectual Property Organization's Committee on Intellectual Property and Genetic Resources, Traditional Knowledge and Folklore.

RAIPON is as well a member of the University of the Arctic. UArctic is an international cooperative network based in the Circumpolar Arctic region, consisting of more than 200 universities, colleges, and other organizations with an interest in promoting education and research in the Arctic region. The collaboration has been paused after the beginning of the Russo-Ukrainian War in 2022.

== See also ==
- Global 500 Roll of Honour
