= Marina Strelnikova =

Russian politician (born 2003)

- Марина Стрельникова

Member of the Duma of Khanty-Mansi Autonomous Okrug — Yugra
- Incumbent
- Assumed office 8 October 2026

Personal details
- Born: 30 December 2003 (age 22) Nefteyugansk, Khanty-Mansi Autonomous Okrug, Russia
- Party: New People
- Profession: Politician

Marina Olegovna Strelnikova (Russian: Марина Олеговна Стрельникова; born 30 December 2003) is a Russian politician who currently serves as a member of the Duma of Khanty-Mansi Autonomous Okrug — Yugra since 8 October 2026. She is currently the youngest deputy in the regional parliament.
