= Zlenko =

Zlenko is a surname. Notable people with the surname include:

- Anatoliy Zlenko (1938–2021), Ukrainian diplomat
- Yelena Zlenko (born 1967), Russian politician
