= Vazhenin =

Vazhenin is a surname. Notable people with the surname include:

- Yury Vazhenin (born 1954), Russian politician
- Alla Vazhenina (born 1983), Russian weightlifter
