= Yelena Zlenko =

Russian politician (born 1967)

- Елена Зленко
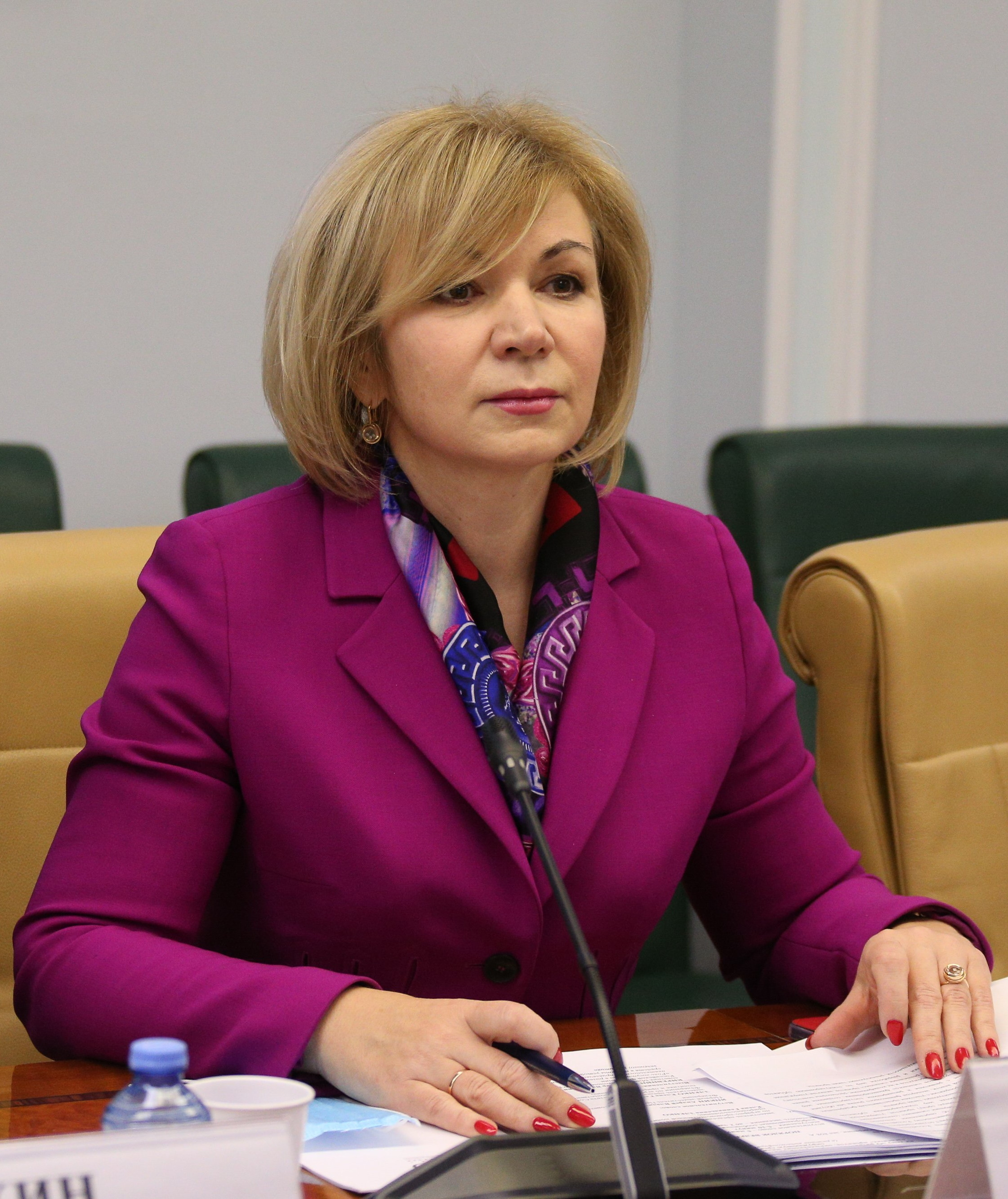

Member of the Federation Council from the executive authority of Yamalo-Nenets Autonomous Okrug
- In office 18 September 2018 – 12 September 2023
- Preceded by: Yury Neyolov
- Succeeded by: Vladimir Pushkaryov

Personal details
- Born: Yelena Gennadyevna Zlenko; 20 June 1967 (age 59) Tyumen, Russian SFSR, Soviet Union
- Party: United Russia

Yelena Gennadyevna Zlenko (Russian: Елена Геннадьевна Зленко; born on 20 June 1967), is a Russian politician who is a member of the Federation Council from the executive authority of Yamalo-Nenets Autonomous Okrug from 18 September 2018 to 12 September 2023.

Due to support for the violation of the territorial integrity of Ukraine during the Russo-Ukrainian war, she is under personal international sanctions from the European Union, the United States, the United Kingdom and a number of other countries.

== Biography ==
Yelena Zlenko was born in Tyumen on 20 June 1967.

In 1989 she graduated with honors from the Tyumen State Institute of Architecture and Construction with a degree in economics and management in construction. Then until 1994 she worked there at the Department of Political Economy.

From 1991 to 1994 she studied at the graduate school of the Tyumen State University. In 1994 she headed the specialized fund "Housing" under the administration of the Yamalo-Nenets Autonomous Okrug. In 2003, she became the secretary of the political council of the Salekhard branch of the United Russia party.

In 2004 she underwent professional retraining at the Academy of National Economy under the Government of the Russia, which later, together with several other universities, was merged into the Russian Academy of National Economy and Public Administration under the President of the Russia.

On 27 March 2005 Zlenko was elected from the United Russia as a member of the State Duma of the YNAO of the IV convocation.

On 14 March 2010 she was re-elected, again from United Russia, to the Legislative Assembly of the Yamalo-Nenets Okrug of the 5th convocation.

On 13 September 2015 she was re-elected to the Yamalo-Nenets Parliament of the VI convocation, however she resigned ahead of schedule.

In the Legislative Assembly of the fifth and sixth convocations, she was the deputy chairman.

On 10 September 2018 Zleno was vested with the powers of a member of the Federation Council – a representative from the executive authority of the Yamalo-Nenets Autonomous Okrug.

At a meeting with the governor of the Yamalo–Nenets Autonomous Okrug, Dmitry Artyukhov, she named support for such infrastructure projects as the Northern Latitudinal Railway and the Northern Latitudinal Railway – 2, as well as the development of the social sphere, among the priority areas of her work in the upper house of the Federal Assembly.
