= Dmitry Pogorely =

Russian politician

Dmitry Pogorely MP
- Дмитрий Погорелый
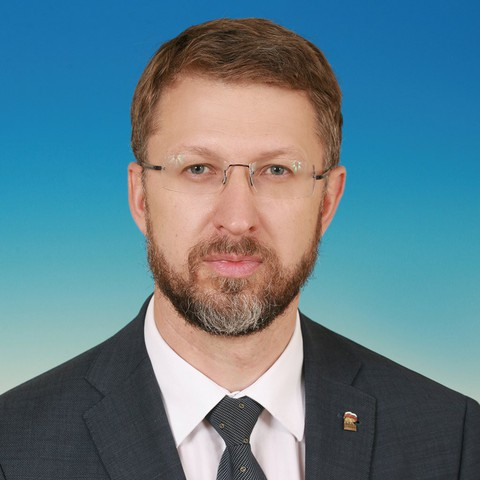
- official portrait, circa 2021

Member of the State Duma
- Incumbent
- Assumed office 12 October 2021
- Preceded by: Grigory Ledkov
- Constituency: Yamalo-Nenets-at-large (No. 225)

Personal details
- Born: 4 October 1977 (age 49) Nizhnevartovsk, Khanty-Mansi Autonomous Okrug, Russian SFSR, Soviet Union
- Party: United Russia
- Education: Nizhnevartovsk Oil College; Tyumen Law Institute of the Ministry of Internal Affairs of Russia

Dmitry Victorovich Pogorely (Russian: Дмитрий Викторович Погорелый; born 4 October 1977) is a Russian politician serving as a deputy of the State Duma.

In 2003, Pogorely was granted a Candidate of Sciences in Juridical Sciences degree. From 2003 to 2008, he worked as a Senior Assistant Prosecutor in the Prosecutor's Office of the Yamalo-Nenets Autonomous Okrug. In 2010–2021, Pogorely served as the director of the State and Legal Department of the Yamalo-Nenets Autonomous Okrug. Since September 2021, he has served as deputy of the 8th State Duma.

== Sanctions ==
He was sanctioned by the UK government in 2022 in relation to the Russo-Ukrainian War.
