= Pavel Sulyandziga =

Russian indigenous rights activist (born 1962)

- Павел Суляндзига
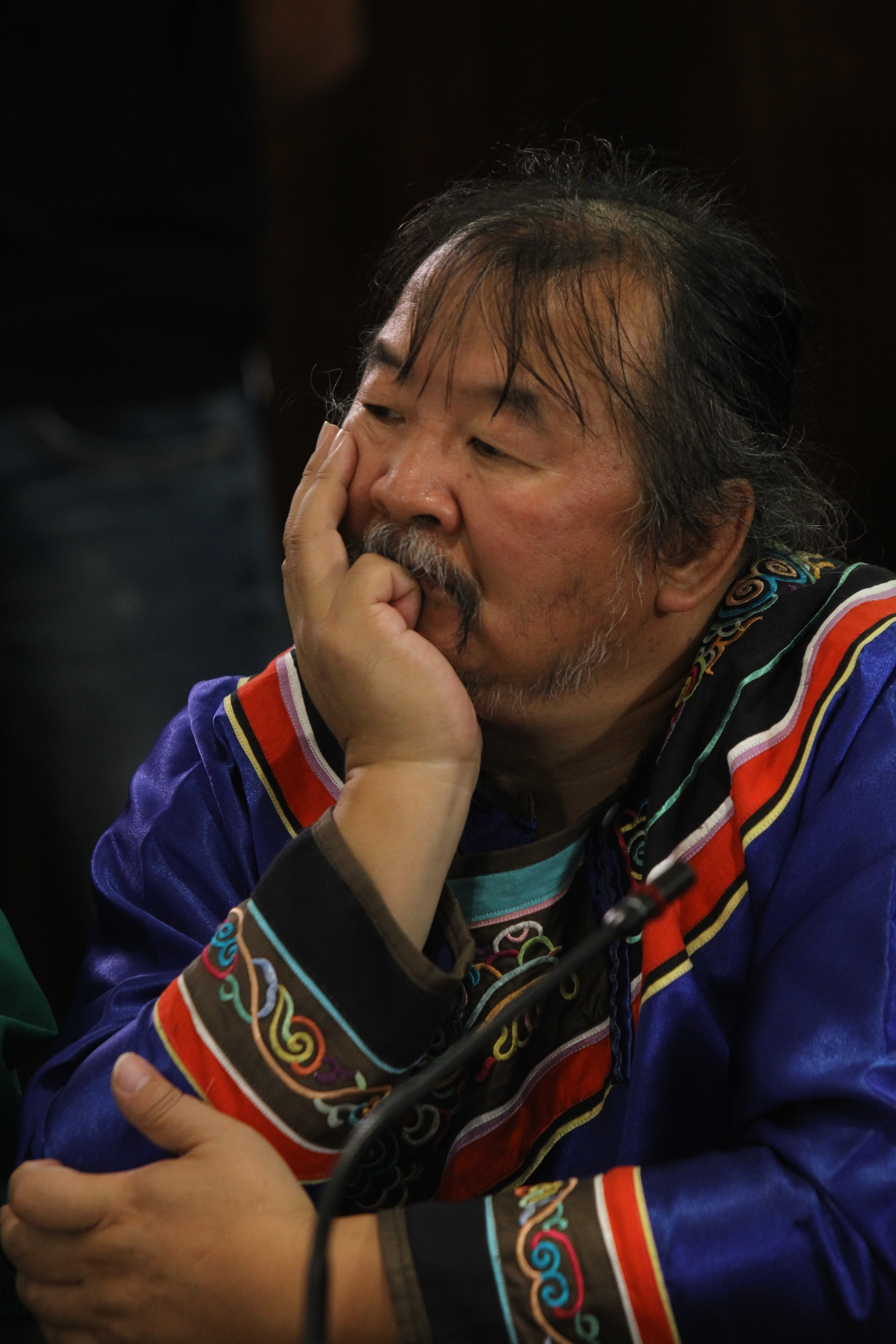
- Sulyandziga in 2011
- Born: Pavel Vasilievich Sulyandziga; 20 February 1962 (age 64) the village of Olon, Russian SFSR, Soviet Union
- Citizenship: Russian
- Education: Khabarovsk State Pedagogical University
- Occupation: Indigenous rights activist
- Political party: Yabloko
- Awards: Certificate of Honor of the Government of the Russian Federation

Pavel Vasilievich Sulyandziga (Russian: Павел Васильевич Суляндзига born 20 February 1962 in Olon, Pozharsky District, Primorsky Kray) is a Russian indigenous rights activist of Udege ethnicity. He is a member of the UN Working Group on the issue of human rights and transnational corporations and other business enterprises, tasked with the dissemination of the UN Guiding Principles on Business and Human Rights and a former member of the Civic Chamber of the Russian Federation

Until 2010, he was the first vice president of the Russian Association of Indigenous Peoples of the North (RAIPON) and member of the United Nations Permanent Forum on Indigenous Issues

== Politics and activism ==
Sulyandziga's home region is the Bikin River valley, located in close proximity to the Sikhote-Alin Nature Reserve, which was designated UNESCO World Heritage in 2001. The Bikin valley is covered with dense forest and constitutes an important habitat for the Amur tiger. During the late 1980s, Pavel Sulyandziga lived in the village of Krasny Yar, Primorsky Krai, where he was successful in mobilizing the population against the administration's plans to grant timber harvesting licenses to a Soviet-Korean joint venture led by Hyundai. Since then, he has remained one of the most outspoken indigenous rights activists in the Russian Federation.

Since 1999 he has been co-editor of the magazine "The World of Indigenous Peoples - Living Arctic" (Russian: Мир коренных народов — Живая Арктика). In 2011, he was elected a member of the UN working group on human rights, transnational corporations and other types of business from the Eastern Europe region for three years.

In August 2012, with the participation of Sulyandziga and with the assistance of the Russian authorities, the evacuation of the seriously ill and isolated from the public world chess champion Boris Spassky from Paris to Moscow was planned and carried out.

In 2014, he was not released from Russia for the UN conference in the United States on indigenous peoples (according to Sulyandziga, a border guard tore a page from his passport and then declared that it was invalid).

In 2016, he was nominated by the Yabloko party as a candidate for the State Duma on the regional list from Primorsky Krai, as well as in a single-mandate constituency.

In 2017, he asked for political asylum in the United States. He lives in the state of Maine, continuing to head the International Fund for the Development and Solidarity of Indigenous Peoples “Batani.” In 2022, he took part in the Free Nations of Russia Forum held in Warsaw, where he proposed the creation of a Congress of Indigenous Peoples of Russia abroad.

In recent years, Sulyandziga has collaborated extensively with various universities. In 2017–2018, he was a visiting scholar at Dartmouth College (New Hampshire), and in 2019–2021 he was appointed a research fellow at Bowdoin College (Maine).

Since 2019, he has been a board member of Indigenous Peoples Rights International.

In 2022, he was elected to the board of directors of IRMA (Initiative for Responsible Mining Assurance), an organization that brings together representatives of business, human rights advocates, environmentalists, labor unions, and Indigenous peoples to develop standards protecting human rights in the mining sector.

Since 2022, he has served as chair of the SIRGE Coalition, an Indigenous-led organization focused on protecting Indigenous rights from business activities connected with the "green economy".

In 2022, he was among the initiators of the creation of the International Committee of Indigenous Peoples of Russia, established to speak on behalf of Indigenous peoples against the war launched by Russia against Ukraine.

On 21 July 2023, he was designated by the Russian Ministry of Justice under the Russian foreign agent law as a "foreign agent".

In 2026, Sulyandziga was selected to be a representative of the indigenous peoples of Russia in the PACE Platform for Dialogue with Russian Democratic Forces. The platform met in Strasbourg for its first session in January 2026.
