= Dmitry Kobylkin =

Russian politician; Minister of Natural Resources (2018-2020)

Dmitry Kobylkin MP
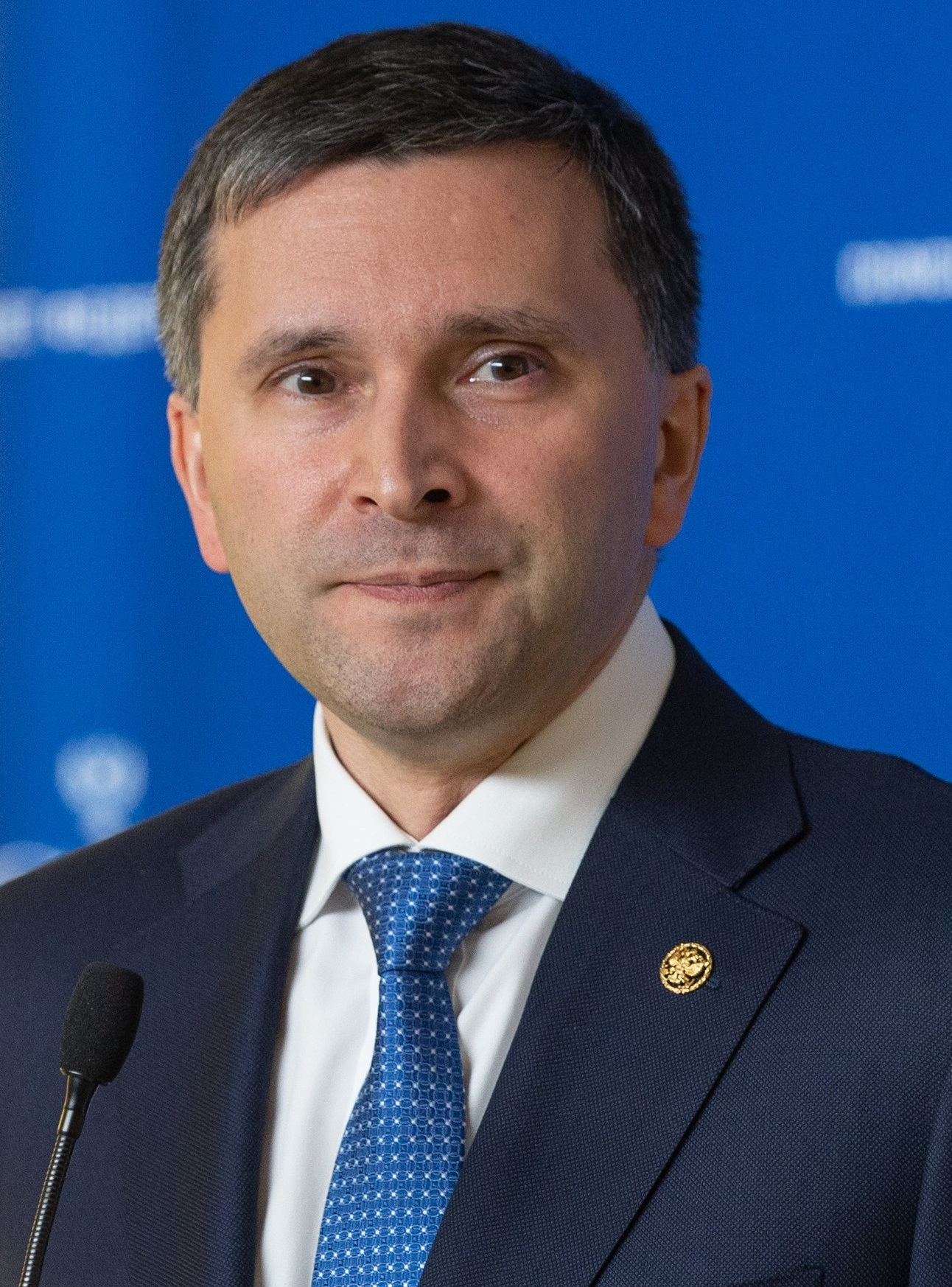

Parliamentary leader of United Russia in the State Duma
- Incumbent
- Assumed office 30 September 2026
- Preceded by: Vladimir Vasilyev

Chairman of the State Duma committee on ecology, natural resources and environmental protection
- In office 12 October 2021 – 30 September 2026
- Preceded by: position was established
- Succeeded by: Yelena Panova

Deputy of the State Duma of Russia
- Incumbent
- Assumed office 19 September 2021
- Constituency: Party List

Minister of Natural Resources & Environment of Russia
- In office 18 May 2018 – 9 November 2020
- Prime Minister: Dmitry Medvedev; Mikhail Mishustin
- Preceded by: Sergey Donskoy
- Succeeded by: Alexander Kozlov

Governor of Yamalo-Nenets Autonomous Okrug
- In office 16 March 2010 – 18 May 2018
- President: Dmitry Medvedev; Vladimir Putin
- Preceded by: Yury Neyolov
- Succeeded by: Dmitry Artyukhov

Personal details
- Born: 7 July 1971 (age 55) Astrakhan, RSFSR, USSR
- Party: United Russia
- Spouse: Galia Minirovna Kobylkina
- Children: Sophia; Nikolai; Elizabeth
- Education: Ufa State Petroleum Technological University; RANEPA (DSc); Synergy University; Tyumen State University
- Occupation: Mining engineer and Geophysicist

Dmitry Nikolaevich Kobylkin (Russian: Дмитрий Николаевич Кобылкин; born 7 July 1971) is a Russian politician, member of the State Duma and Parliamentary leader of United Russia since 30 September 2026.

Previously he was chairman of the State Duma Russia committee of the on ecology, natural resources and environmental protection from 2021 to 2026, Minister of Natural Resources & Environment of Russia from 2018 to 2020 and Governor of Yamalo-Nenets Autonomous Okrug from 2012 to 2018,

== Biography ==
=== Early life and education ===
Kobylkin was born to geophysicist parents on 7 July 1971, in Astrakhan. In 1993, he graduated from the Ufa Oil Institute, specialising in mining engineering and geophysics.

Kobylkin attended the occupational retraining institute at the Ural Academy of Public Administration (a branch of RANEPA) specialising in State and Municipal Management, completing a Doctor of Economic Sciences in 2004.

=== Career ===
From 1994 to 1995, Kobylkin was a geologist on the Tarkosalinskoye oil and gas exploration expedition.

From 1996 to 2001, Kobylkin was the Personnel Director and first Deputy General Director at Purneftegazgeologiya. Starting in 2000, he led the development of the Khancheiskoye field and managed oil and gas exploration there.

In May 2001, Kobylkin was appointed General Director of Khancheineftegaz.

In 2002, Kobylkin was elected Deputy Head of the Administration of the Purovsky District, Yamal-Nenets Autonomous Area.

In 2005, Kobylkin was elected Head of the Purovsky District.

In 2009, Kobylkin was included in the personnel pool of the President of the Russian Federation.

In March 2010, Kobylkin was nominated by the Russian President and later confirmed as Governor of the Yamal-Nenets Autonomous Area by the region's Legislative Assembly.

On 12 March 2015, Kobylkin was appointed Acting Governor of the Yamal-Nenets Autonomous Area by the Presidential Executive Order.

On 1 October 2015, Kobylkin was elected Governor of the Yamal-Nenets Autonomous Area by the region's Legislative Assembly.

On 18 May 2018, Kobylkin was appointed Minister of Natural Resources and Environment as part of the Second Medvedev Cabinet. He was re-appointed on 21 January 2020 during the transition to the Mishustin Cabinet. However, Kobylkin left his post as Minister on 9 November 2020 during a reshuffle of Mishustin's government. During the 2021 Russian legislative election on 19 September, he received a mandate to be a deputy of the 8th State Duma as part of the United Russia party-list. Since taking office on 12 October 2021, he has chaired the State Duma Committee on Ecology, Natural Resources and Environmental Protection.

=== Personal life ===
Kobylkin is married and has three children.

== Sanctions ==
On 16 December 2022, the EU sanctioned Dmitry Kobylkin concerning the 2022 Russian invasion of Ukraine.
