= Yury Vazhenin =

Russian politician (born 1954)

- Юрий Важенин

Senator from the Khanty-Mansi Autonomous Okrug
- In office 6 October 2016 – 7 October 2021
- Preceded by: Vasily Sondykov
- Succeeded by: Alexander Noviukhov

Personal details
- Born: Yury Vazhenin; 25 August 1954 (age 72) Pļaviņas, Latvian SSR, Soviet Union
- Education: Riga Technical University

Yury Ivanovich Vazhenin (Russian: Юрий Иванович Важенин; born 25 August 1954) is a Russian politician who served as a senator from the Khanty-Mansi Autonomous Okrug from 2016 to 2021.

== Career ==
Yury Vazhenin was born on 25 August 1954 in Pļaviņas, Latvian Soviet Socialist Republic. Later, he graduated from the Riga Technical University. From 1976 to 1979, he was an engineer at the Ivdel Linear Production Department of Main Gas Pipelines. From 1979 to 2007, he worked at the SurgutTransgaz. From 1994 to 1996, he was a deputy of the Surgut City Council. From 1996 to 2016, Vazhenin served as a deputy of the Duma of Khanty-Mansi Autonomous Okrug — Yugra. From 2016 to 2021, he represented the Khanty-Mansi Autonomous Okrug in the Federation Council.
