= Yamalo-Nenets constituency =

Russian legislative constituency

Yamalo-Nenets single-member constituency
- Constituency of the Russian State Duma

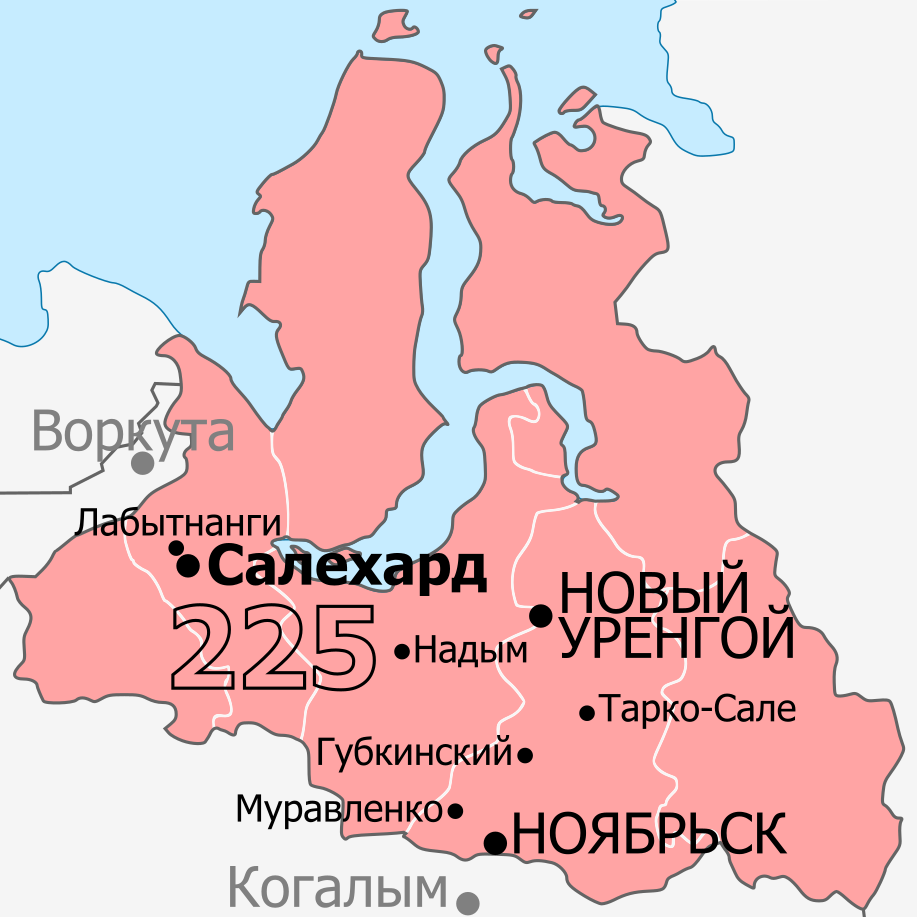
- Deputy: Dmitry Pogorely; United Russia
- Federal subject: Yamalo-Nenets Autonomous Okrug
- Districts: Gubkinsky, Krasnoselkupsky, Labytnangi, Nadym, Nadymsky, Muravlenko, Novy Urengoy, Noyabrsk, Priuralsky, Purovsky, Tazovsky, Salekhard, Shuryshkarsky, Yamalsky
- Voters: 343,906 (2026)

The Yamalo-Nenets constituency (No.225) is a Russian legislative constituency in Yamalo-Nenets Autonomous Okrug. The constituency encompasses the entire territory of the Yamalo-Nenets Autonomous Okrug.

The constituency has been represented since 2021 by United Russia deputy Dmitry Pogorely, former chief counsel to the Administration of Yamalo-Nenets Autonomous Okrug, who won the open seat left vacant by the resignation of two-term United Russia deputy Grigory Ledkov in September 2020.

== Boundaries ==
1993–2007, 2016–present: Gubkinsky, Krasnoselkupsky District, Labytnangi, Nadym, Nadymsky District, Muravlenko, Novy Urengoy, Noyabrsk, Priuralsky District, Purovsky District, Tazovsky District, Salekhard, Shuryshkarsky District, Yamalsky District
The constituency has been covering the entirety of the Yamalo-Nenets Autonomous Okrug since its initial creation in 1993.

== Members elected ==
Election	Member	Party
1993	Vladimir Goman (Note: appointed Chairman of the State Committee on Arctic Development in May 1998)	Independent
1995	Vladimir Goman	Independent
1999	Viktor Chernomyrdin (Note: appointed Ambassador to Ukraine in May 2001)	Our Home – Russia
2001	Natalya Komarova	Independent
2003	Natalya Komarova	United Russia
2007	Proportional representation - no election by constituency	
2011	Proportional representation - no election by constituency	
2016	Grigory Ledkov (Note: appointed to the Federation Council in September 2020)	United Russia
2021	Dmitry Pogorely	United Russia
2026	Dmitry Pogorely	United Russia

== Election results ==
=== 1993 ===
Summary of the 12 December 1993 Russian legislative election in the Yamalo-Nenets constituency
Candidate	Party	Votes	%
Vladimir Goman	Independent	33,482	26.19%
Anatoly Kirsanov	Party of Russian Unity and Accord	–	–
Yury Lapshin	Independent	–	–
Sergey Michurin	Civic Union	–	–
Gennady Pushko	Democratic Party	–	–
Viktor Saloyedov	Independent	–	–
Nina Yadne	Independent	–	–
Total		127,823	100%

=== 1995 ===
Summary of the 17 December 1995 Russian legislative election in the Yamalo-Nenets constituency
Candidate	Party	Votes	%
Vladimir Goman (incumbent)	Independent	68,884	37.15%
Natalya Komarova	Independent	44,426	23.93%
Vera Tupoleva	Independent	16,807	9.05%
Irina Levchenko	Liberal Democratic Party	12,729	6.86%
Yury Strelnikov	Independent	12,590	6.78%
Galina Motriyeva	Christian-Democratic Union - Christians of Russia	6,108	3.29%
against all		22,112	11.92%
Total		185,579	100%

=== 1998 ===
A by-election scheduled for 27 September 1998 was cancelled after all registered candidates withdrew.

=== 1999 ===
Summary of the 19 December 1999 Russian legislative election in the Yamalo-Nenets constituency
Candidate	Party	Votes	%
Viktor Chernomyrdin	Our Home – Russia	93,192	48.07%
Grigory Bystritsky	Yabloko	21,067	10.87%
Valery Tupolev	Independent	20,197	10.42%
Oleg Klementyev	Communist Party	15,145	7.81%
Sergey Zotov	Independent	5,647	2.91%
Sergey Bilkey	Independent	2,562	1.32%
Aleksandr Prokudin	Independent	2,357	1.22%
against all		31,521	16.26%
Total		193,854	100%

=== 2001 ===
Summary of the 16 December 2001 by-election in the Yamalo-Nenets constituency
Candidate	Party	Votes	%
Natalya Komarova	Independent	86,045	73.30%
Eduard Panasyuk	Independent	5,614	4.78%
Boris Pakhirko	Independent	3,179	2.71%
against all		20,222	17.23%
Total		117,380	100%

=== 2003 ===
Summary of the 7 December 2003 Russian legislative election in the Yamalo-Nenets constituency
Candidate	Party	Votes	%
Natalya Komarova (incumbent)	United Russia	144,046	70.43%
Anatoly Kudryashov	Rodina	18,429	9.01%
Viktor Ponomarenko	Liberal Democratic Party	7,774	3.80%
Oleg Klementyev	Communist Party	7,453	3.64%
Gennady Ivanov	Independent	4,257	2.08%
against all		21,116	10.32%
Total		204,647	100%

=== 2016 ===
Summary of the 18 September 2016 Russian legislative election in the Yamalo-Nenets constituency
Candidate	Party	Votes	%
Grigory Ledkov	United Russia	158,298	63.68%
Denis Sadovnikov	Liberal Democratic Party	34,609	13.92%
Maksim Karpikov	Communist Party	12,242	4.92%
Sergey Popov	A Just Russia	10,242	4.12%
Aleksey Kolesnikov	Communists of Russia	8,452	3.40%
Mikhail Ushakov	Independent	7,401	2.98%
Andrey Denisov	Party of Growth	6,639	2.67%
Sergey Noskin	Rodina	5,805	2.34%
Total		248,589	100%

=== 2021 ===
Summary of the 17-19 September 2021 Russian legislative election in the Yamalo-Nenets constituency
Candidate	Party	Votes	%
Dmitry Pogorely	United Russia	125,568	55.63%
Ivan Vershinin	Liberal Democratic Party	37,871	16.78%
Yelena Kukushkina	Communist Party	29,029	12.86%
Maksim Lazarev	A Just Russia — For Truth	18,320	8.12%
Andrey Drobot	Rodina	10,020	4.44%
Total		225,702	100%

=== 2026 ===
Summary of the 18-20 September 2026 Russian legislative election in the Yamalo-Nenets constituency
Candidate	Party	Votes	%
Dmitry Pogorely (incumbent)	United Russia	140,411	56.75%
Denis Sadovnikov	Liberal Democratic Party	41,001	16.57%
Aleksandr Lamdo	Communist Party	29,758	12.03%
Marina Markovskaite	A Just Russia	20,996	8.49%
Viktor Muravyov	New People	12,574	5.08%
Total		247,418	100%
