= Lev Bayandin =

Russian politician (1942–2018)

- Лев Баяндин

1st Governor of Yamalo-Nenets Autonomous Okrug
- In office 23 October 1991 – 12 February 1994
- Preceded by: Office created
- Succeeded by: Yury Neyolov

Chairman of the Yamalo-Nenets District Executive Committee
- In office 1988–1990

Personal details
- Born: 2 January 1942 Cherdyn, Perm Oblast, Russian SFSR, Soviet Union
- Died: 14 February 2018 (aged 76) Tyumen, Russia
- Spouse: Vera Bayandina
- Education: Perm Polytechnic Institute

Lev Sergeyevich Bayandin (Russian: Лев Сергеевич Баяндин; 2 January 1942 – 14 February 2018) was a Russian politician who served as the first Governor of Yamalo-Nenets Autonomous Okrug from 1991 until 1994. He was married to Vera Bayandina.

Bayandin died on 14 February 2018, at the age of 76.
