= Dmitry Artyukhov =

Russian politician (born 1988)

- Дмитрий Артюхов
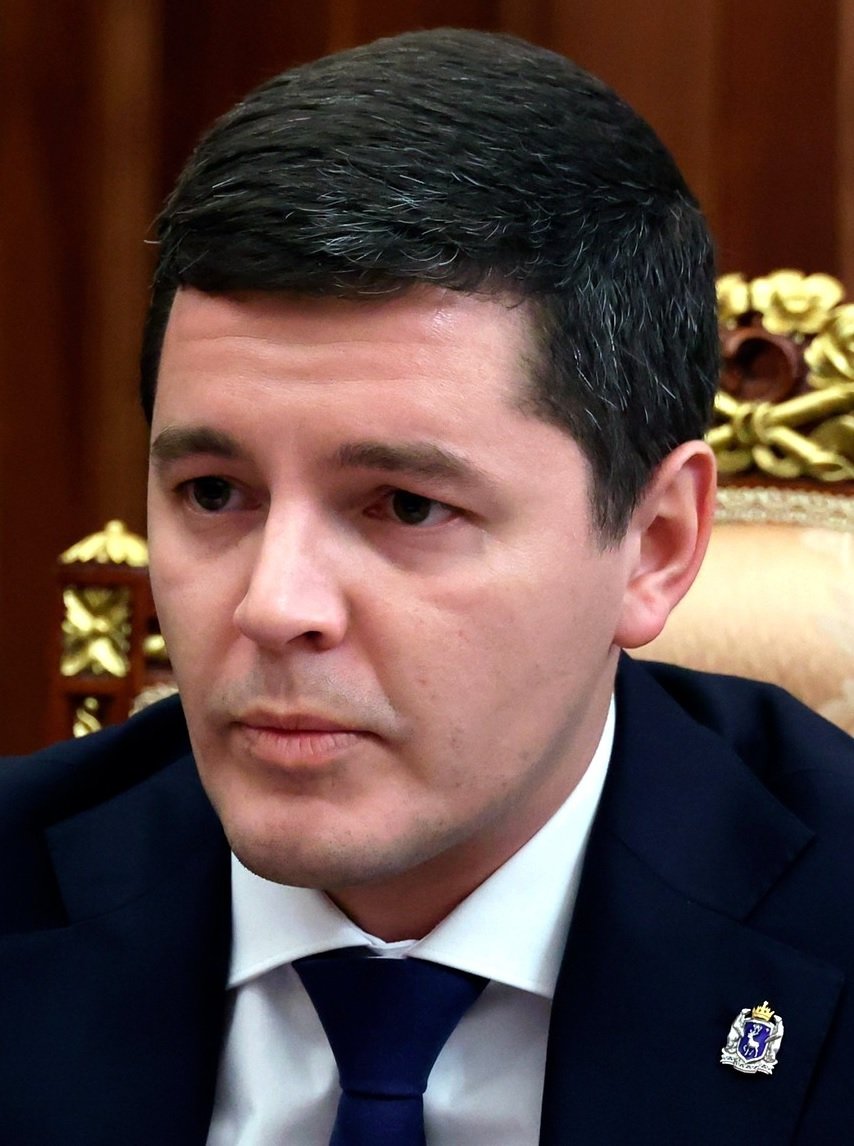
- Dmitry Artyukhov in 2023

4th Governor of Yamalo-Nenets Autonomous Okrug
- Incumbent
- Assumed office 29 May 2018
- Preceded by: Dmitry Kobylkin

Personal details
- Born: 7 February 1988 (age 38) Salekhard, RSFSR, USSR
- Party: United Russia
- Children: 1
- Occupation: Economist

Dmitry Andreevich Artyukhov (Russian: Дмитрий Андреевич Артюхов; born 7 February 1988) is a Russian politician who has served as the Governor of Yamalo-Nenets Autonomous Okrug since 29 May 2018. As of May 2018, he is the youngest head of a federal subject in Russia. In 2021, Artyukhov's official income was 26,409,000 rubles. His wife owned 15,076,000 rubles.

== Sanctions ==
Artkyukhov was sanctioned by the UK government in 2022 in relation to the Russo-Ukrainian War. In August of the same year, Canada also included him in its list of sanctions.

In March 2024 he was further sanctioned by the European Union because under his administration, extensive and systematic torture practices were documented in the FKU IK-3 Penal Colony in the Yamalo-Nenets Autonomous Okrug, where Alexei Navalny was imprisoned and subsequently died in prison.

== Personal life ==
Artyukhov is married to a financial economist with whom he went to school together. A son was born in December 2022.
