= Dmitry Goritsky =

Russian politician (born 1970)

- Дмитрий Горицкий
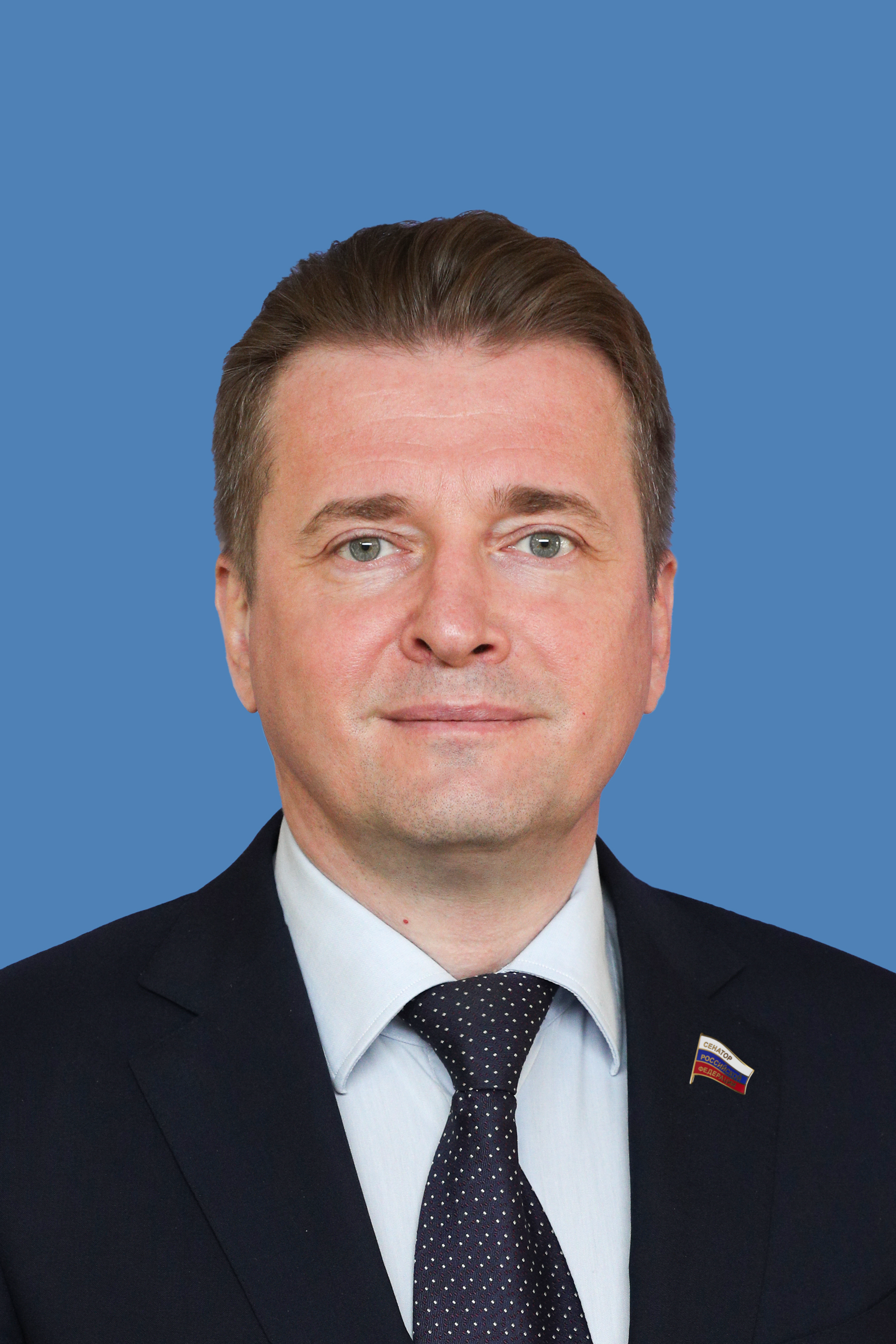

Senator from Tyumen Oblast
- Incumbent
- Assumed office 7 October 2021
- Preceded by: Mikhail Ponomaryov

Personal details
- Born: Dmitry Goritsky; 28 October 1970 (age 55) Krasnodar, Russian Soviet Socialist Republic, Soviet Union
- Party: United Russia
- Education: University of Tyumen

Dmitry Yuryevich Goritsky (Russian: Дмитрий Юрьевич Горицкий; born 28 October 1970) is a Russian politician serving as a senator from Tyumen Oblast since 7 October 2021.

== Biography ==
Dmitry Goritsky was born on 28 October 1970 in Krasnodar. In 1993, he graduated from the University of Tyumen. From 1994 to 1996 he worked as a lawyer in the Zapsibkombank. In May 1997 he was appointed the First Deputy Director of the Salekhard branch of Zapsibkombank. From May 1998 to 2001, Goritsky served as Vice President of Zapsibkombank. The same year, he was appointed the president of Zapsibkombank. From 2007 to 2016, Goritsky was the deputy of the Tyumen Oblast Duma. On 7 October 2021, he became the senator from the Tyumen Oblast Duma.

=== Sanctions ===
Dmitry Goritsky is under personal sanctions introduced by the European Union, the United Kingdom, the USA, Canada, Switzerland, Australia, Ukraine, New Zealand, for ratifying the decisions of the "Treaty of Friendship, Cooperation and Mutual Assistance between the Russian Federation and the Donetsk People's Republic and between the Russian Federation and the Luhansk People's Republic" and providing political and economic support for Russia's annexation of Ukrainian territories.
