= Grigory Ledkov =

Russian politician (born 1969)

Grigory Ledkov MP
- Григорий Ледков
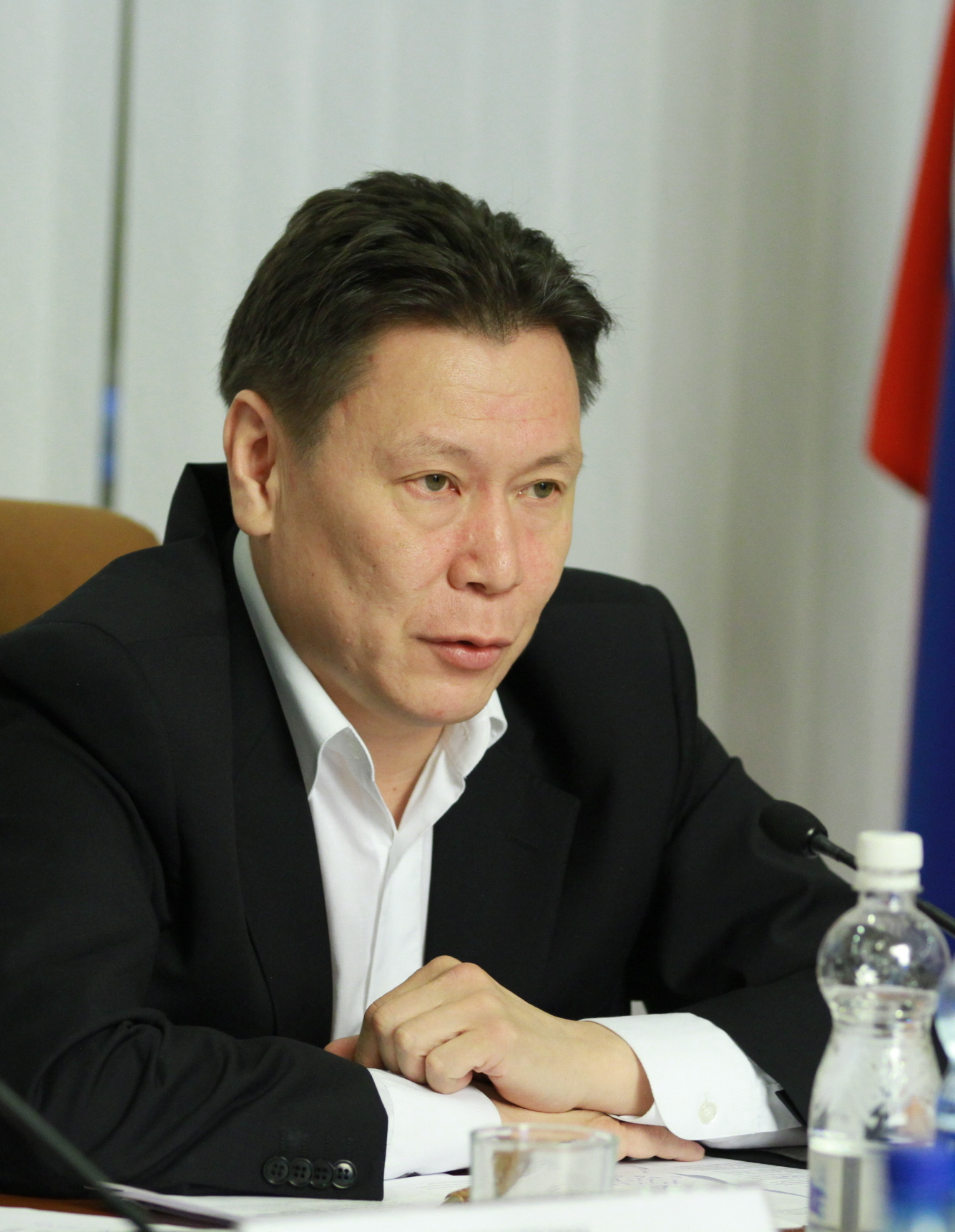

Russian Federation Senator from Yamalo-Nenets Autonomous Okrug
- In office 25 September 2020 – 25 September 2025
- Preceded by: Alexander Ermakov
- Succeeded by: Alexey Sitnikov

Member of the State Duma
- In office 5 October 2016 – 22 September 2020
- Preceded by: Constituency re-established
- Succeeded by: Dmitry Pogorely
- Constituency: Yamalo-Nenets-at-large (No. 225)

Personal details
- Born: 26 March 1969 (age 57) Naryan-Mar, Nenets National Okrug, Russian SFSR, USSR
- Party: United Russia
- Education: Herzen University

Grigory Petrovich Ledkov (Russian: Григорий Петрович Ледков; born 26 March 1969) is a Russian politician serving as a senator from the Nenets Autonomous Okrug since 25 September 2020.

== Career ==
Grigory Ledkov was born on 26 March 1969 in Naryan-Mar, in the family of ethnic Nenets people. In 1988, he graduated from the local veterinary technical school. In 1996, Ledkov also received a degree from the Herzen University. In 2000, he was appointed specialist of the Department for Indigenous Peoples of the North of the Administration of the Tazovsky District. From 2000 to 2004, he also served as the head of the Gydan village council of the Tazovsky district. On 4 December 2011, he was elected deputy of the State Duma of the 6th convocation. In 2013, he became the president of the Russian Association of Indigenous Peoples of the North. In 2016, Ledkov got re-elected as deputy of the 7th State Duma. On 25 September 2020, he became the senator from the Yamalo-Nenets Autonomous Okrug.

== Sanctions ==
Grigory Ledkov is under personal sanctions introduced by the European Union, the United Kingdom, the USA, Canada, Switzerland, Australia, Ukraine, New Zealand, for ratifying the decisions of the "Treaty of Friendship, Cooperation and Mutual Assistance between the Russian Federation and the Donetsk People's Republic and between the Russian Federation and the Luhansk People's Republic" and providing political and economic support for Russia's annexation of Ukrainian territories.
