= Alexander Noviukhov =

Russian politician

- Александр Новьюхов

Senator from the Khanty-Mansi Autonomous Okrug
- Incumbent
- Assumed office 7 October 2021
- Preceded by: Yury Vazhenin

Personal details
- Born: Alexander Noviukhov; 3 October 1975 (age 51) Beryozovo, Khanty-Mansi Autonomous Okrug, Soviet Union
- Party: United Russia
- Education: University of Tyumen

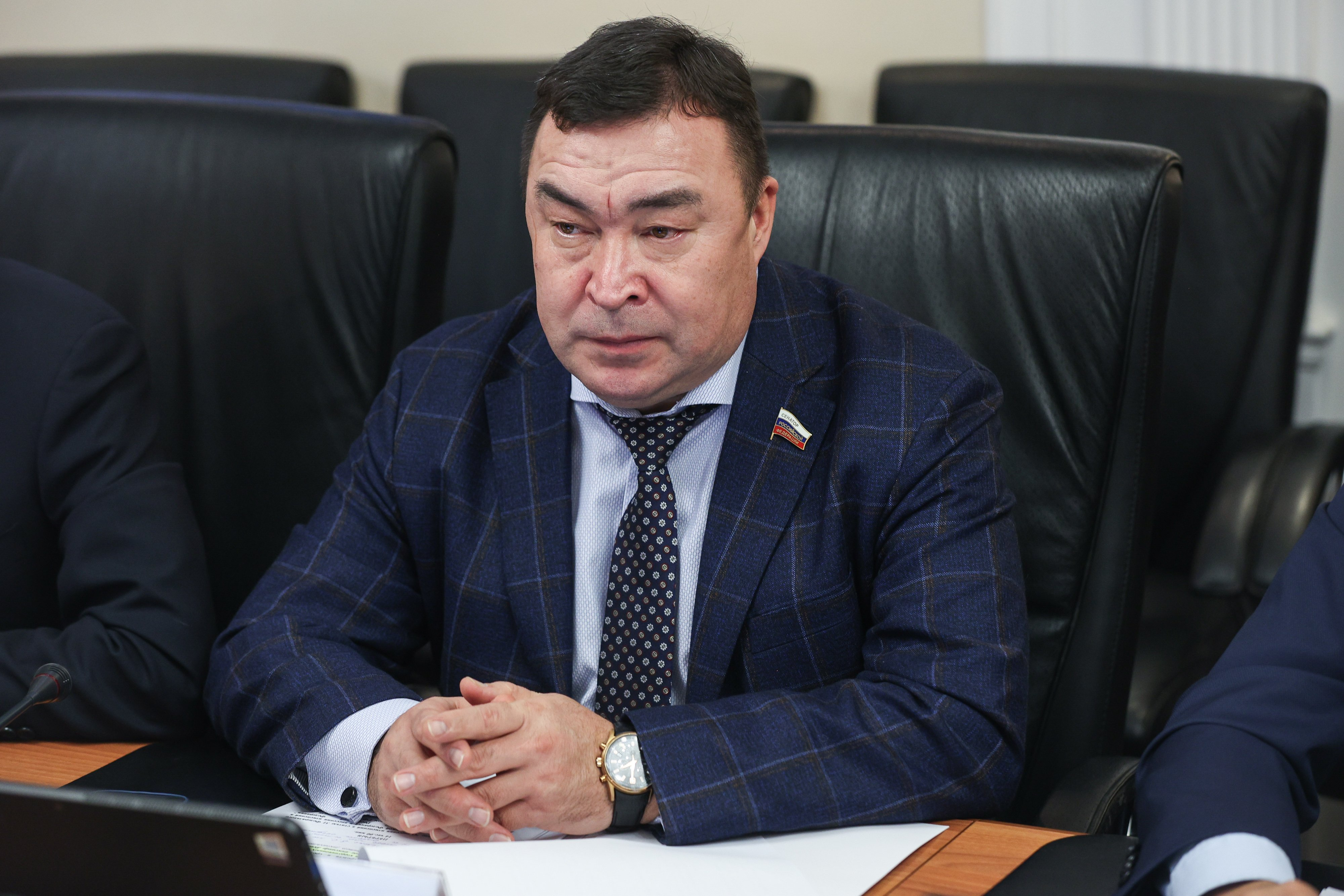

Alexander Vyacheslavovich Noviukhov (Russian: Александр Вячеславович Новьюхов; born 5 October 1975) is a Russian politician serving as a senator from the Khanty-Mansi Autonomous Okrug since 7 October 2021.

== Career ==
Alexander Noviukhov was born on 5 October 1975 in Beryozovo, Khanty-Mansi Autonomous Okrug. In 1999, he graduated from the University of Tyumen. From 1991 to 1995, he worked as a sailor and track worker. After graduation, he served as Deputy Chairman of the Committee for the Affairs of Indigenous Peoples of the North of the Administration of the Berezovsky District of the Tyumen Region. From 2003 to 2008, Noviukhov worked as Assistant to the Deputy Chairman of the Khanty-Mansi Autonomous Okrug government on issues of indigenous peoples of the North. From 2011 to 2016, he was the Advisor to the First Deputy Governor of Khanty-Mansi Autonomous Okrug. From 2016 to 2021, Noviukhov was the deputy of the Duma of Khanty-Mansi Autonomous Okrug — Yugra. On 7 October 2021, he became the senator from the Khanty-Mansi Autonomous Okrug.

== Sanctions ==
Alexander Noviukhov is under personal sanctions introduced by the European Union, the United Kingdom, the USA, Canada, Switzerland, Australia, Ukraine, New Zealand, for ratifying the decisions of the "Treaty of Friendship, Cooperation and Mutual Assistance between the Russian Federation and the Donetsk People's Republic and between the Russian Federation and the Luhansk People's Republic" and providing political and economic support for Russia's annexation of Ukrainian territories.
