= Vladimir Pushkaryov =

Russian politician and mountaineer

- Владимир Пушкарёв
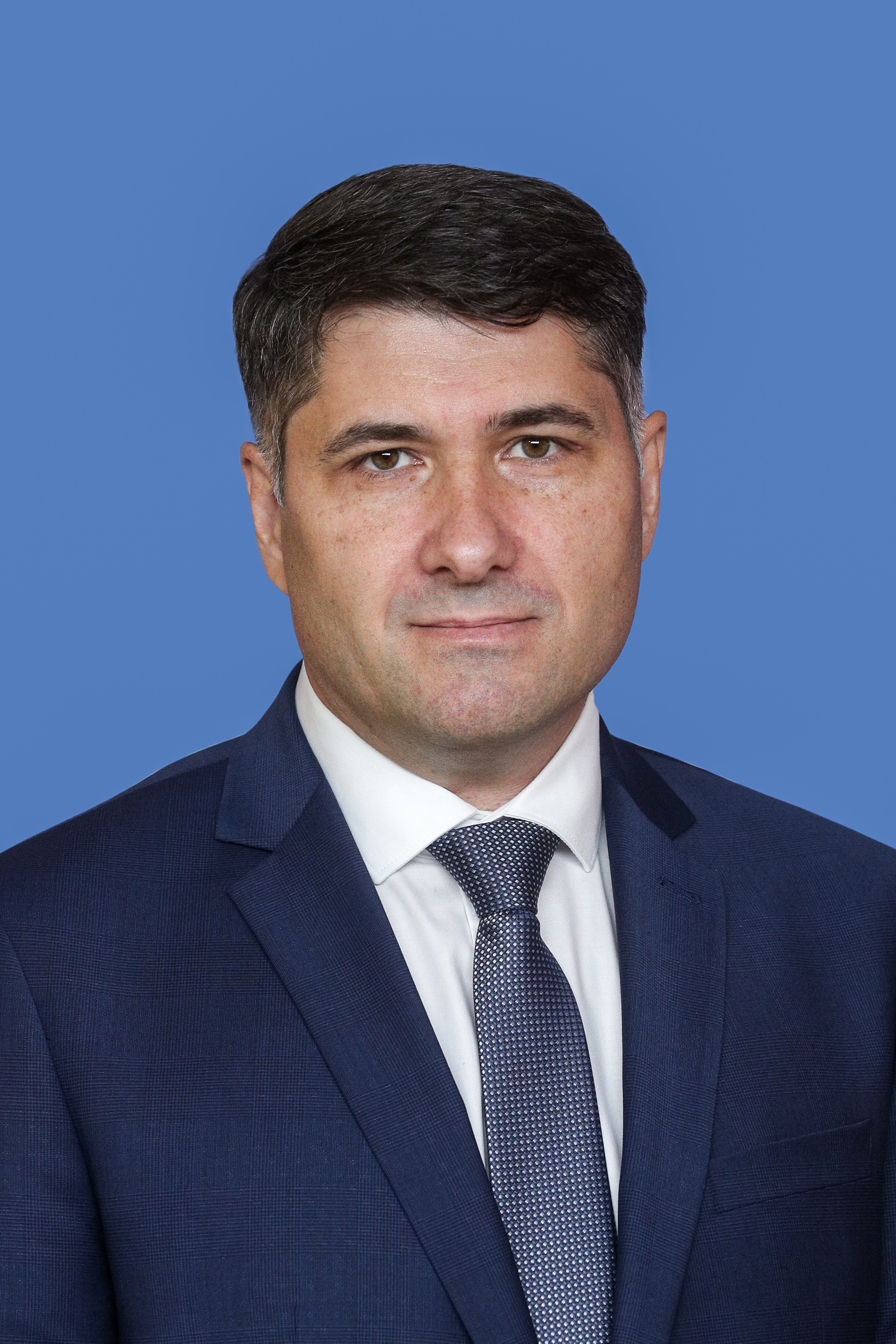

Senator from Nenets Autonomous Okrug
- Incumbent
- Assumed office 12 September 2023
- Preceded by: Yelena Zlenko

Personal details
- Born: 22 February 1973 (age 53) Vulcănești, Moldavian SSR, Soviet Union (now Moldova)
- Party: United Russia
- Education: Sverdlovsk Art School; Russian State University for the Humanities

Vladimir Aleksandrovich Pushkaryov (Russian: Владимир Александрович Пушкарёв; born February 22, 1973, in Vulcănești, Moldavian SSR, Soviet Union) is a Russian athlete, mountain climber, public figure, and political activist. He is a Senator of the Russian Federation representing the executive authority of the Yamalo-Nenets Autonomous Okrug (since September 12, 2023) and a member of the Federation Council Committee on Agrarian and Food Policy and Environmental Management.

He was elected to the State Duma of the Federal Assembly of the Russian Federation of the 7th convocation, where he was appointed Deputy Chairman of the State Duma Committee on Regional Policy and Problems of the North and Far East, and a member of the United Russia faction.

== Biography ==
From 1989 to 1993, he studied at the Sverdlovsk Art School. In 2010, he graduated with a degree in Organization Management from the Russian State University for the Humanities. From 1988 to 1989, he worked at the Noyabrskneftespetsstroy trust as a DSM repairman. From 1993 to 1994, he worked at the Center for Children's and Youth Tourism and Excursions as a route instructor. From 1994 to 1995, he served as the Center's deputy director. From 1995 to 1998, he was the head of the ski tourism association and a teacher of additional education. From 1998 to 2000, he worked at the Yamalo-Nenets Okrug Museum of Fine Arts as an artist and designer. From 2000 to 2001, he worked at the municipal institution "Sports and Technical Club" as a sports tourism trainer and instructor.

Since 1986, he has been involved in sport mountaineering. He has participated in ascents and expeditions, including numerous mountain treks, both in Russia and abroad. From 2001 to 2009, he climbed the highest peaks in Australia, Antarctica, Africa, Asia, Europe, and North and South America, participating in the international project "Seven Summits of the World." In 2003, he founded and became president of the Regional Public Organization "Sports Tourism Federation of the Yamalo-Nenets Autonomous Okrug". From 2001 to 2002, he worked at the municipal institution "Editorial Office of the Severnaya Vakhta Newspaper". From 2002 to 2006, he worked at the municipal institution "Sever Publishing House" as a computer graphics artist. From 2007 to 2008, he worked at Children's and Youth Sports School No. 2 as a coach and teacher.

From 2009 to 2014, he served as director and co-owner of the construction company Yamalstroyrekonstruktsiya, according to SPARK-Interfax. From 2012 to 2015, he worked at Arctic Ecological Expedition LLC as director. Since 2014, he has worked at the Russian Arctic Development Center as director.

In September 2016, he ran for the State Duma on the United Russia party list, but was unsuccessful in the seat distribution. On September 28, the Central Election Commission of the Russian Federation awarded Pushkarev the vacant seat, and he became a deputy of the 7th State Duma. From 2016 to 2019, during his term as a deputy of the State Duma of the 7th convocation, he co-authored 32 legislative initiatives and amendments to draft federal laws.

On February 18, 2017, he was elected by a majority vote as President of the Yamalo-Nenets Autonomous Okrug Climbing Federation.

On September 12, 2023, he was appointed Senator to the Federation Council representing the executive body of the Yamalo-Nenets Autonomous Okrug, replacing Yelena Zlenko.

He is an Honored Traveler of Russia and a Candidate Master of Sports in sports tourism.

He is married and has two children.
