= Legislative Assembly of the Yamalo-Nenets Autonomous Okrug =

Regional parliament of the Yamalo-Nenets Autonomous Okrug, Russia

Legislative Assembly of the Yamalo-Nenets Autonomous Okrug Законодательное собрание Ямало-Ненецкого автономного округа
- 7th legislature

Type
- Type: Unicameral

Leadership
- Chairman: Sergey Yamkin, United Russia since 30 September 2015

Structure
- Seats: 22
- Political groups: United Russia (18) LDPR (2); CPRF (1) SRZP (1)

Elections
- Voting system: Mixed
- Last election: 12-14 September 2025
- Next election: 2030

Meeting place
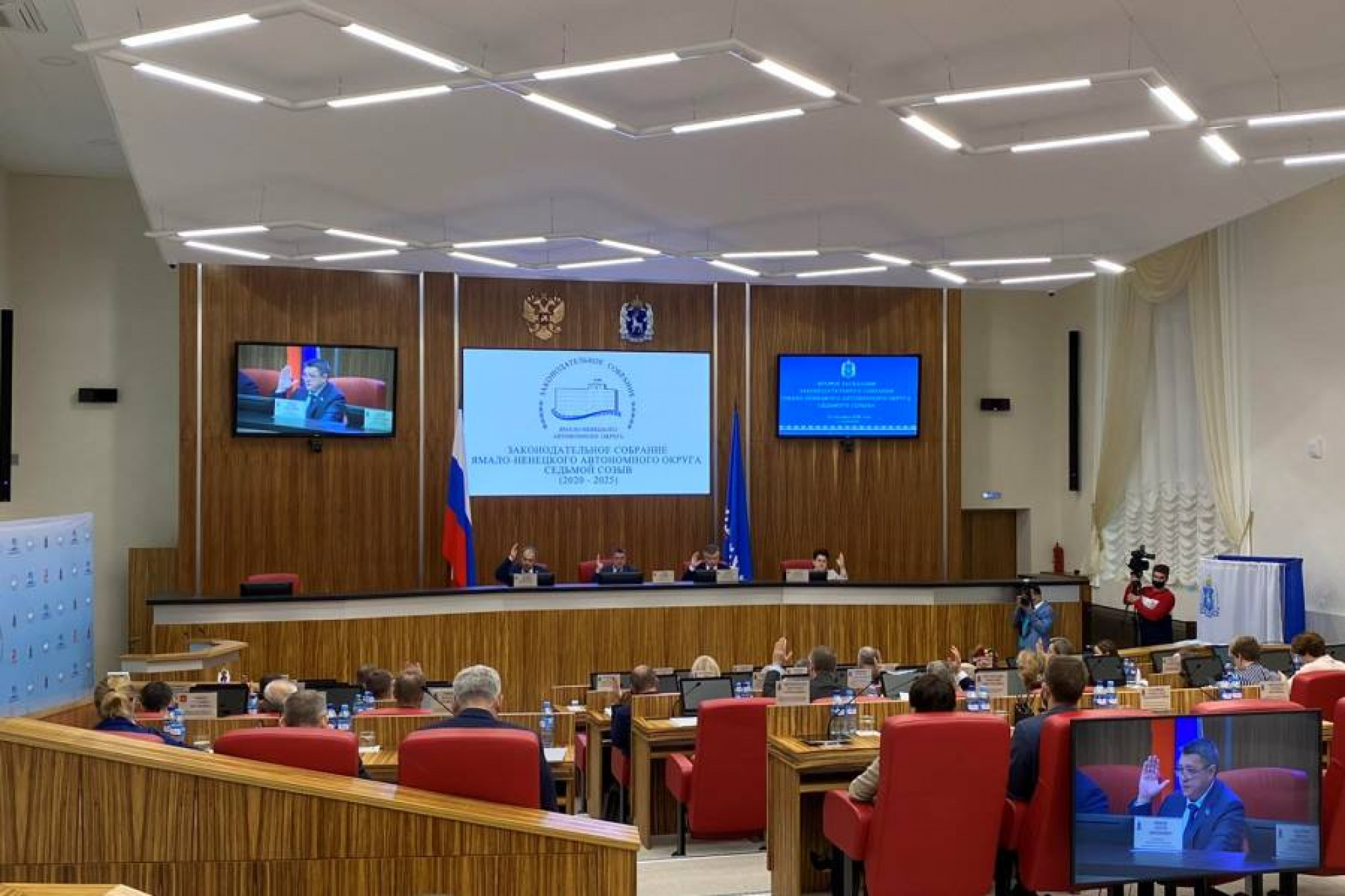
- 72 Republic Street, Salekhard

Website
- zs.yanao.ru

The Legislative Assembly of the Yamalo-Nenets Autonomous Okrug (Russian: Законодательное собрание Ямало-Ненецкого автономного округа, romanized: Zakonodatel'noye sobraniye Yamalo-Nenetskogo avtonomnogo okruga) is the regional parliament of the Yamalo-Nenets Autonomous Okrug, a federal subject of Russia. A total of 22 deputies are elected for five-year terms.

== Elections ==
=== 2020 ===
Party	%	Seats
United Russia	64.64	18
Liberal Democratic Party of Russia	15.31	2
Communist Party of the Russian Federation	8.83	1
A Just Russia	6.05	1
Russian Party of Freedom and Justice	1.52	0
Party of Growth	1.01	0
Rodina	0.82	0
Registered voters/turnout	47.12	

=== 2025 ===
Party	%	Seats
United Russia	65.60	18
Liberal Democratic Party of Russia	16.12	2
Communist Party of the Russian Federation	10.46	1
A Just Russia	6.41	1
Invalid ballots	1.40	0
Registered voters/turnout	49.25	
