= Vladimir Sysoyev =

Russian politician (born 1973)

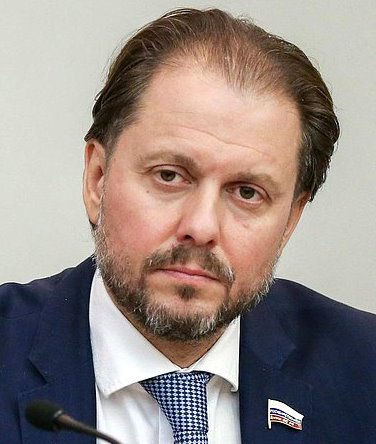
- Sysoyev in 2018

Member of the State Duma
- Incumbent
- Assumed office 21 May 2025
- Preceded by: Evgeny Markov

Personal details
- Born: 21 June 1973 (age 53) Tyumen
- Party: Liberal Democratic Party of Russia
- Education: University of Tyumen

Vladimir Vladimirovich Sysoyev (born 21 June 1973) is a Russian politician who has been a member of the State Duma since 2025.

== See also ==
- 8th State Duma
