= Duma of Khanty-Mansi Autonomous Okrug — Yugra =

Regional parliament of Khanty-Mansi Autonomous Okrug, Russia

Duma of Khanty-Mansi Autonomous Okrug — Yugra Дума Ханты-Мансийского автономного округа — Югры
- 7th legislature

Type
- Type: Unicameral

Leadership
- Chairman: Boris Khokhryakov, United Russia since 2011

Structure
- Seats: 38
- Political groups: United Russia (29) CPRF (4); LDPR (3); SRZP (1) RPPSJ (1)

Elections
- Last election: 19 September 2021
- Next election: 2026

Website
- dumahmao.ru

The Duma of Khanty-Mansi Autonomous Okrug — Yugra (Russian: Дума Ханты-Мансийского автономного округа — Югры, romanized: Duma Khanty-Mansiyskogo avtonomnogo okruga — Yugry) is the regional parliament of Khanty-Mansi Autonomous Okrug, a federal subject of Russia. A total of 38 deputies are elected for five-year terms.

== Elections ==
=== 2021 ===
Party	%	Seats
United Russia	40.23	29
Communist Party of the Russian Federation	17.22	4
Liberal Democratic Party of Russia	14.64	3
A Just Russia — For Truth	7.71	1
Russian Party of Pensioners for Social Justice	7.45	1
Communists of Russia	3.97	0
Russian Party of Freedom and Justice	2.69	0
Rodina	1.44	0
Registered voters/turnout	46.61	
