= Yuri Shafranik =

Soviet-Russian engineer, politician, and businessman (born 1952)

- Юрий Шафраник
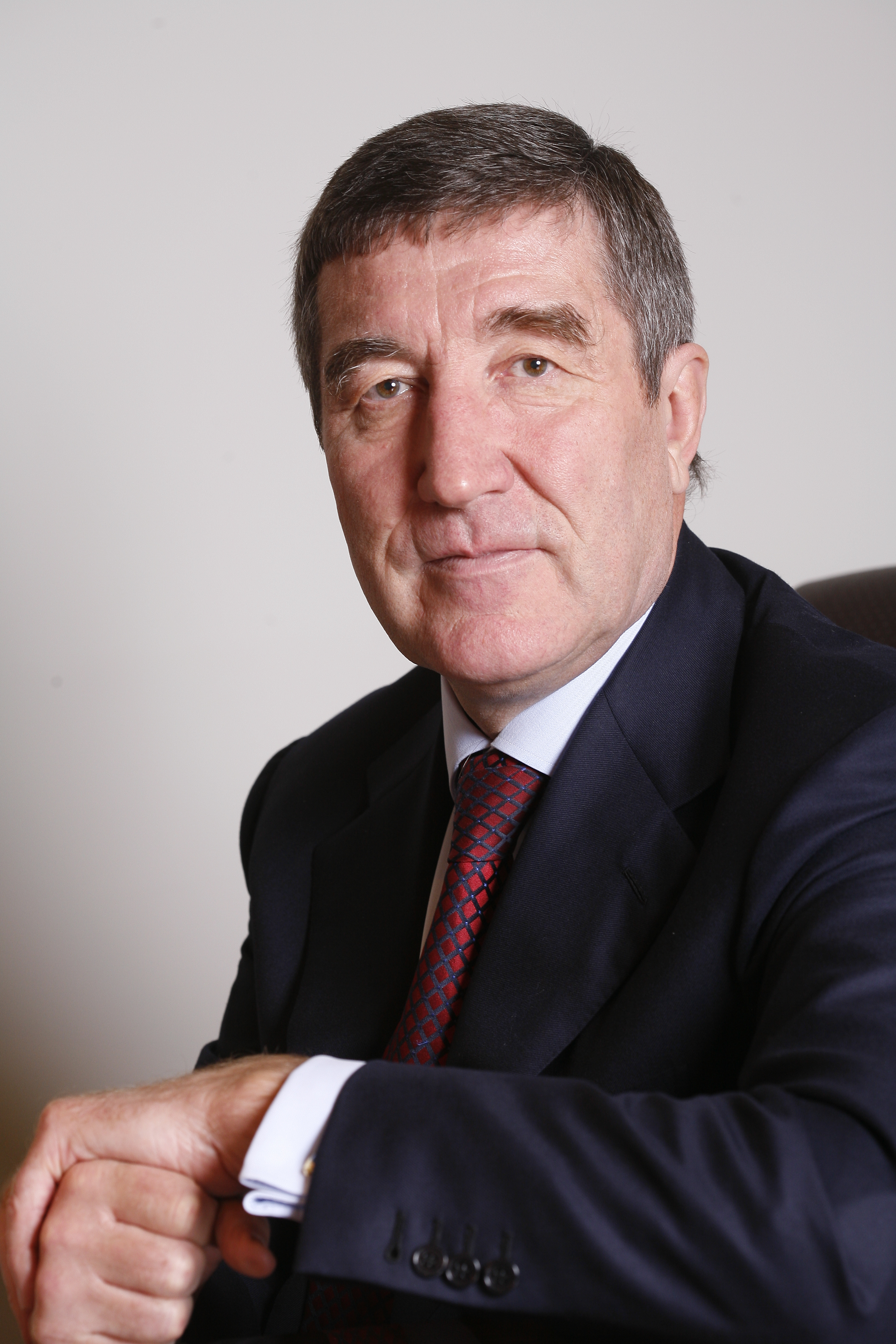
- Shafranik in 2011

3rd Minister of Fuel and Energy
- In office 12 January 1993 – 9 August 1996
- Preceded by: Vladimir Lopukhin
- Succeeded by: Pyotr Rodionov

1st Head of Administration of Tyumen Oblast
- In office 27 September 1991 – 12 January 1993
- Succeeded by: Leonid Roketsky

Personal details
- Born: 27 February 1952 (age 74) Karasul, Tyumen Oblast, Russian SFSR, USSR
- Education: Tyumen State Oil and Gas University
- Occupation: Founder of Soyuzneftegaz

Yuri Konstantinovich Shafranik (born 27 February 1952) is a Russian entrepreneur, public figure and expert on the energy sector.

Yuri Shafranik is the chairman of the board of the Union of Oil and Gas producers of Russia, and a co-chair of Russian delegation to the Dartmouth Conferences.

Yuri Shafranik founded the international group of companies "SoyuzNefteGaz".

== Education ==
Born in a worker's family in the Siberian village of Karasul (Tyumen Oblast), Yuri Shafranik graduated from Tyumen State Oil and Gas University in 1974 with a degree in electrical engineering of automation and remote-control systems. He earned his second degree in 1980 from the same university, majoring in mining engineering technology and the complex mechanization of oil and gas fields.

== Early career ==
Since 1974, he worked at the enterprises of the production association "Nizhnevartovskneftegaz" as a technician (at the Samotlor oil field), then as a process engineer, senior engineer, and laboratory manager.

In 1980, from the first days of the development of the Uryevskoye oil field, he worked at the newly established Uryevneft production association. He held positions such as the head of the central engineering and technological service, chief engineer, and head of the oil and gas production department. He was responsible for field development.

Later, he assumed the position of First Deputy General Director for Western Siberia at Tatneft.

Shafranik actively participated in the development of a new oil region - the Langepas zone (including the Van-Yeganskoye, Lokosovskoye, Pokamasovskoye, Potochnoye, and Uryevskoye oil fields in Western Siberia), as well as in the creation of engineering infrastructure and the construction of the cities of Langepas and Pokachi, growing from a technician to the general director of the Langepasneftegaz - one of the largest oil producers of that time.

In 1990 Shafranik was elected Chairman of the Tyumen Regional Council of People's Deputies in an alternative election.

In September 1991 Shafranik was appointed Head of the Administration (Governor) of the Tyumen Region. During that period as Governor of the Tyumen Region, Yuri Shafranik became one of the initiators and authors of the Law "On Subsoil".

In 1993 Shafranik was appointed the Minister of Energy of the Russian Federation, a position he held for three years until 1996. While being the Minister of Energy he promoted the adoption of the Law on Production Sharing Agreements (1995).

When Shafranik held the Office of Energy Minister he was one of initiators and active participants of the Russian-American Intergovernmental Commission (Gore-Chernomyrdin Commission). The energy agreements and policies of the Gore-Chernomyrdin Commission were supported by Energy Minister Hazel R. O'Leary and Energy Minister Yuri Shafranik.

According to Yuri Shafranik himself and former UK Energy Minister Tim Eggar, Yuri Shafranik did not participate in the privatization process of the 1990s.

== Business ==
Following those years as Energy Minister, Shafranik then started his business career and in 1997, founded the Central Fuel Company. The Central Fuel Company became a member of the Inam international project in partnership with SOCAR, Amoco, Monument Oil & Gas, which was sold to Shell for $18 mln.

In 2000 Yuri Shafranik went on to found international investment group of companies, SoyuzNefteGaz, where he serves as chairman. The Group completed projects in more than 20 countries ranging from oil and gas exploration and production to provision of oil and gas field services and construction.

All commercial projects initiated and managed by Yuri Shafranik were financed through attracting funds from foreign institutional and private investors, without the use of budgetary funds. The SoyuzNefteGaz strategy was based on early entry into new emerging projects and their development, ensuring stable growth.

A number of successful projects in the energy sector, initiated by Yuri Shafranik, have received international recognition. These projects were implemented as a result of a series of mergers and acquisitions:

- First Calgary Petroleums (FCP): From 2003 to 2008, Yuri Shafranik served as a director of First Calgary Petroleums, a Canadian company engaged in oil and natural gas exploration, development, and production in North Africa. The company was later sold to the Italian giant Eni SpA for $923 mln.
- UzPEC: In 2004, the Russian company "SoyuzNefteGaz" acquired 100% of the shares of UzPEC from Trinity Energy Group. UzPEC was involved in the production sharing agreement (PSA) for the Central Ustyurt and Southwest Gissar license areas in the Republic of Uzbekistan. Yuri Shafranik assumed the position of chairman of the Board of Directors of the company. He held this position until June 2007. In 2007, "Uzbekneftegaz" signed a production sharing agreement with "SoyuzNefteGaz Vostok," a subsidiary of "SoyuzNefteGaz." Under the agreement, "SoyuzNefteGaz" committed to investing $466.2 million in the project, including $369.6 million in the first three years. Until 2008, under the leadership of Yuri Shafranik, "SoyuzNefteGaz" implemented a project for the development of oil fields in the Republic of Uzbekistan. The project included eight fields in the Southwest Gissar region and two exploration blocks in the Ustyurt region, which had significant oil and gas potential. In 2008, "LUKOIL Overseas" (a wholly owned subsidiary of LUKOIL) acquired 100% of SNG Holdings Ltd., including "SoyuzNefteGaz Vostok Limited," from MNK "SoyuzNefteGaz." The acquisition included the assets related to the Southwest Gissar and Ustyurt regions. The deal was valued at approximately $580 million.
- In 2005, Emerald Energy reached an agreement to acquire a 50% stake in the Block 26 development project in Syria from "SoyuzNefteGaz." In 2007, Emerald Energy conducted a secondary offering, including 3.5 million common shares, in favor of "SoyuzNefteGaz." After the additional share placement Unit, "SoyuzNefteGaz" stake in the share capital of Emerald Energy increased to 8.39% (5 million common shares). In 2009, the Chinese company Sinochem acquired Emerald Energy.

Shafranik was the first to recognize the potential of the Vankor Field for Russia. SoyuzNefteGaz consolidated the assets of the project, raised initial financing, and carried out a complete business restructuring. Subsequently, the project was sold to Rosneft, a national oil company. Since 2019, Yuri Shafranik has focused his efforts on activities outside of the SoyuzNefteGaz, which has completed its active investment phase.

According to Yuri Shafranik's interview with Viktor Loshak, he mentioned that he built his business in the oil and gas industry from scratch.

== Public activity ==
In the 1990s, Yuri Shafranik co-founded the endowment fund of Tyumen Industrial University (TyumGNGU, TIU). In recognition of his contributions to Tyumen Industrial University, Shafranik was awarded the title of Honorary Professor.

Shafranik leads an active public life: he was among the initiators of the creation of new types of non-governmental private sector organizations: the Union of Oil and Gas Producers of Russia and the Supreme Mining Council (since 2002).

Since 2006, Yuri Shafranik has been the chairman of the Board of Directors of the Institute of Energy Strategy, where he is also a co-founder.

Yuri Shafranik is a member of the Russian Council on International Affairs (RCIA), a non-governmental academic analytical center operating on a non-profit basis.

Yuri Shafranik heads the boards of trustees for the public foundations "Nash Vybor - Malaya Rodina" (Our Choice - Small Homeland), which supports youth initiatives and promotes a healthy lifestyle) as well as "Vozrozhdenie Tobolska" (Revival of Tobolsk), which focuses on the development and revitalization of Tobolsk region.

Yuri Shafranik provides support to charitable organizations, participating in the restoration of churches, the construction of clubs and sports complexes. He also delivers lectures and engages in extensive public activities. Throughout his work, he advocates for the interests of his native Karasul and the Tyumen region.

== Dartmouth Conferences ==
The Dartmouth Conferences is a dialogue between Russian and American citizens aimed at finding areas of common ground between the two countries in the fields of politics, science, education and culture. It was created in 1960, with regular conferences running through until 1990. The conferences were renewed in 2014 and since 2015, Yuri Shafranik has been a co-chair of the Russian delegation.

== Scientific activities ==
He is a member of the Presidium of the Mining Academy of Russian Federation, an Academician of the Academy of Technological Sciences of Russian Federation, the International Academy of Fuel and Energy Complex, and an honorary professor of Tyumen Industrial Institute.

=== Scientific works ===
- Mastepanov A., Rylsky V., Saenko V., Shafranik Y. Ekonomika i Energetika Regionov Rossiyskoy Federatsii [Economy and Energy of the Regions of the Russian Federation]. Moscow: Ekonomika, 2001, p. 11;
- Shafranik Y. Infrastrukturnye Proekty na Rossiyskom Shel’fe [Infrastructure Projects on the Russian Shelf]. Moscow: Energeticheskaya politika, 2014, pp. 10–17. ISSN 2409-5516;
- Shafranik Y. Rossiyskaya Energetika: Vybor Razvitiya v Novyh Usloviyah [Russian Energy: Choosing Development in New Conditions]. Moscow: Energeticheskaya politika, 2014, pp. 21–31, ISSN 2409-5516;
- Bushuev A., Mastepanov A., Shafranik Y. Potentsial “Energeticheskoy Tsivilizatsii” i Geopolitika ["Potential of 'Energy Civilization' and Geopolitics]. Moscow: Energeticheskaya politika, 2015, pp. 3—11, ISSN 2409-5516;
- Shafranik Y. Mnogopolyarny Energeticheskiy Mir Sovremennosti: Sostoyanie i Tendentsii [Multipolar Energy World of the Present: State and Trends]. Moscow: Energeticheskaya politika, 2016, pp. 3—8, ISSN 2409-5516;
- Kryukov V., Shafranik Y. Neft’ v Prostranstve i “Prostranstvo Nefti” [Oil in Space and the 'Space of Oil]. Moscow: Energeticheskaya politika, 2018, pp. 69–74, ISSN 2409-5516.

=== Books ===
- Krasnyansky G., Malyshev Y., Salamatin A., Shafranik Y., Zaidenvarg V., Zykov V. Restrukturizatsiya Ugol’noy Promyshlennosti: Teoriya. Opyt. Programmy. Prognoz. [Restructuring of the Coal Industry: Theory. Experience. Programs. Forecast]. Moscow: Kompaniya “Rosugol”, 1996. ISBN 5-88586-008-4;
- Kryukov V., Shafranik Y. Neftegazovye Resursy v Kruge Problem [Oil and Gas Resources in the Circle of Problems]. 1997;
- Kryukov V., Shafranik Y. Zapadno-Sibirsky Fenomen [West-Siberian Phenomenon]. 2000;
- Kozovoy G., Malyshev Y., Shafranik Y. Restrukturizatsiya Ugol’noy Promyshlennosti Rossii. Novaya Paradigma Razvitiya [Restructuring of the Coal Industry in Russia. A New Paradigm of Development]. Moscow: Neft’ i gaz, 2004. ISBN 5-7246-0304-7;
- Kryukov V., Shafranik Y. Neftegazovy Sektor Rossii: Trudny Put’ k Mnogoobraziyu [Russia's Oil and Gas Sector: The Difficult Path to Diversification]. Moscow: Pero, 2016. ISBN 978-5-906883-74-2.
