= Taian Bank =

Chinese retail bank

- Formerly: Taian City Commercial Bank
- Type: public private joint venture
- Industry: Financial services
- Founded: 1986
- Headquarters: Tai'an, Shandong, China
- Number of locations: 42 branches (2015)
- Services: Retail banking
- Revenue: ▲CN¥1.369 billion (2015)
- Operating income: ▲CN¥471 million (2015)
- Net income: ▲CN¥370 million (2015)
- Total assets: ▲CN¥52.749 billion (2015)
- Total equity: ▲CN¥2.617 billion (2015)
- Capital ratio: 8.78% (CET1)
- Website: taccb.com.cn

Taian Bank
- Simplified Chinese: 泰安银行
- Traditional Chinese: 泰安銀行
Transcriptions

Bank of Taian Co., Ltd. trading as Taian Bank is a Chinese urban commercial bank based in Tai'an, Shandong Province.

The bank was formerly known as Taian City Commercial Bank. It was reported that the bank was linked to Tai'an-born Xiao Jianhua's Tomorrow Group, which "New Fortune" accused that Xiao owned some of the private investors of the bank by proxy person. Those accused companies, did pledged the shares to private equity funds of New Times Securities (another firm that was accused as a member of Tomorrow Group). However, also pledged the shares to state-owned China Fortune Trust (and its private equity funds).

Tai'an Municipal People's Government owned 34.56% shares as the largest (known) shareholder consortium.

== History ==
The predecessor of the bank was founded in 1986. On 16 August 2007 it became Taian City Commercial Bank and on 12 November 2015 became Taian Bank.

== Shareholders ==
Tai'an Finance Bureau-owned Taian Taishan Investment and its subsidiaries owned 30.01% shares of the bank as of 31 December 2012, while another city-owned company (Chinese: 泰安市商贸国有资产经营) owned an additional 6.25% shares. Puhua Investment, a company majority owned by a central-government enterprise and Taian Fund Investment & Guaranty (Chinese: 泰安市基金投资担保经营, a subsidiary of Taian Taishan Investment) at that time, owned 7.29% shares, making the state owned 43.55% shares in total.

In 2013, Taian Fund Investment & Guaranty sold the shares (22.51%) to sister companies, as well as selling the stake in Puhua Investment to private investor in 2015, making Taian Government owned 34.56% shares in total in the bank (as of 31 December 2015). The stake was also diluted by the CN¥600 million capital increase (CN¥300 million share capital with CN¥1 nominal value and CN¥300 million share premium) in 2013–14, as only Taian Taishan Investment and its subsidiaries, a new investor Shandong Xinchazhuang Mining (Chinese: 山东新查庄矿业) for 37.49 million shares, some existing private shareholders (Chinese: 山东中宸投资担保, Tài'ānshì Tàishān Huáchéng Kējì, Tài'ān Rénréndá Kējì and Jǐnán Sānwàng Sùliào for 167.69 million shares) and employee subscribed the shares (4.79 million shares).

As of 31 December 2015

top 10 shareholders
Rank	Chinese name	English name (if known) or pinyin	Number of shares	Ratio
1	泰安市泰山投资	Taian Taishan Investment	109.93 million	9.99%
1	泰安市l城市建设投资	Tài'ānshì Tàishān Chéngshì Jànshè Tóuzī	109.93 million	9.99%
1	济南三望塑料	Jǐnán Sānwàng Sùliào	109.93 million	9.99%
4	泰安市城市发展投资	Tài'ānshì Chéngshì Fāzhǎn Tóuzī	109.89 million	9.99%
5	泰安市泰山华城科技开发	Tài'ānshì Tàishān Huáchéng Kējì Kāifā	108.68 million	9.88%
6	泰安人仁达科技	Tài'ān Rénréndá Kējì	105.93 million	9.63%
7	山东宸中信息科技	Shāndōng Chénzhōng Xìnxī Kējì	83.55 million	7.60%
8	泰安市泰山祥盛技术开发	Tài'ānshì Tàishān Xiángshèng Jìshù Kāifā	78.50 million	7.14%
9	普华投资	Puhua Investment	58.31 million	5.30%
10	泰安市商贸国有资产经营	Tài'ānshì Shāngmào Guóyǒu Zīchǎn Jīngyíng	50.00 million	4.55%
10	泰山酒业集团	Tàishān Jiǔyè Jítuán	50.00 million	4.55%

- Note:
- the joint-largest shareholder, Taian Taishan Investment was owned by Tai'an Government (via Tai'an Finance Bureau); Taian Taishan Investment is the parent company of another joint-largest shareholder (Chinese: 泰安市泰山城市建设投资), as well as the fourth (Chinese: 泰安市城市发展投资), making Taian Taishan Investment owned 29.97% stake of the bank; It was reported another subsidiary (Chinese: 泰安弘泽投资担保; renamed to Chinese: 泰安弘泽融资担保 in 2015) owned 375,000 shares in 2015 or 0.03% shares
- another joint-largest shareholder, Jǐnán Sānwàng Sùliào had pledged 17.7 million shares to New Times Securities since December 2015 it was report that 24.6 million shares were pledged to a private equity fund of New Times Securities from October 2014 to October 2015
- the 5th largest shareholder (Chinese: 泰安市泰山华城科技开发; pinyin: Tài'ānshì Tàishān Huáchéng Kējì Kāifā; lit. 'Tai'an Taishan Huacheng Technology Development'), was the second largest shareholder of Puhua Investment (9th shareholder of the bank) for 38.16% stake; the 99.67% shares of Tàishān Huáchéng Kējì had pledged to China Fortune Trust since May 2015 (a private equity fund of the trust company since 2016).
- the 6th largest shareholder Tài'ān Rénréndá Kējì, had pledged most of the shares (105.84 million) to China Fortune Trust since March 2015
- the 7th largest shareholder (former name Chinese: 山东中宸投资担保) had pledged 40.9 million shares to New Times Securities since January 2017 (in 4 tranches) It was reported most of the shares had pledged to 4 private equity funds of New Times Securities in October 2015 for 1-year.
- the 9th largest shareholder, Puhua Investment's largest shareholder was central-government owned Potevio (39.04%); 57.82 million shares of the bank were pledged to China Fortune Trust since March 2015
- The 10th largest shareholder, (Chinese: 泰安市商贸国有资产经营) was owned by Tai'an Government (via Tai'an Municipal State-owned Assets Supervision and Administration Commission)
- other shareholders such as Shandong Xinchazhuang Mining had pledged all its shares (37.49 million) to Bohai International Trust since March 2016
