= Soyuzneftegaz =

Russian oil company

- Native name: СоюзНефтеГаз
- Company type: Private
- Industry: Oil and gas
- Founded: 2000
- Founder: Yuri Shafranik
- Headquarters: Moscow, Russia
- Key people: Yuri Shafranik (Chairman)
- Website: soyuzneftegaz.ru

Soyuzneftegaz (Russian: СоюзНефтеГаз) – international investment group of companies headquartered in Russia involved in oil and gas exploration and production, as well as construction. It was founded and headed by Yuri Shafranik.

== Activities ==
Soyuzneftegaz was established in 2000.

The Group focused primarily on the development of oil and gas projects world-wide in partnership with other Russian, western or local institutional investors. All commercial projects initiated and managed by Yuri Shafranik were financed exclusively by raising funds from foreign institutional and private investors. Soyuzneftegaz’s strategy was based on the early stage entrance to new emerging projects and their development to ensure stable growth. A number of projects in the energy industry initiated by Yuri Shafranik have been internationally recognised, such as First Calgary Petroleums (FCP), UzPEC Limited and Emerald Energy. These projects were implemented through a series of mergers and acquisitions involving such Russian and international petroleum majors as Italian Eni SpA, Russian Lukoil and Chinese petrochemical giant Sinochem.

In 2019 Soyuzneftegaz had completed its active investment phase.

== UzPEC ==
In 2004, Soyuzneftegaz acquired 100% shares in UzPEC from Trinity Energy Group. UzPEC was involved in the production sharing agreement (PSA) for the Central Ustyurt and Southwest Gissar license areas in the Republic of Uzbekistan. In 2007, Uzbekneftegaz signed a production sharing agreement with Soyuzneftegaz Vostok, a subsidiary of Soyuzneftegaz. Under the agreement, Soyuzneftegaz committed to investing $466.2 million in the project, including $369.6 million in the first three years.

Until 2008, Soyuzneftegaz implemented a project for the development of oil fields in the Republic of Uzbekistan. The project included eight fields in the Southwest Gissar region and two exploration blocks in the Ustyurt region, which had significant oil and gas potential. In 2008, Lukoil Overseas (a wholly owned subsidiary of Lukoil) acquired 100% of SNG Holdings Ltd., including SoyuzNefteGaz Vostok Limited, from Soyuzneftegaz. The acquisition included the assets related to the Southwest Gissar and Ustyurt regions. The deal was valued at approximately $580 million.

== Rafidain ==
In early 2003, Soyuzneftegaz signed a contract with the Iraqi authorities for developing the Rafidain (today it is called Abu-Amud) oil field in southern Iraq, with the production of 100,000 barrels per day. Soyuzneftegaz received 25.5 million barrels (4.05 million cubic metres) in the Oil-for-Food Programme, which allowed Iraq to export oil to some companies and then to resell it in the United States, Europe, and Asia. Most of the funds were reserved for humanitarian needs or infrastructure work in Iraq.

After the arrival of American troops in Iraq and a sharp deterioration of the situation in the country in 2004, Russian firms and specialists were withdrawn, and all work was practically terminated.

== Emerald Energy ==
In October 2004, Soyuzneftegaz won a tender in Syria for the onshore Blocks 12 and 14 near the Iraqi border. In 2005, the company acquired a 50% stake in the PSA project in Block 26, in northeastern Syria, from Devon Energy.

In 2005, the LSE listed Emerald Energy PLC reached an agreement to acquire a 50% stake in the Block 26 development project in Syria from Soyuzneftegaz. In 2007, Emerald Energy conducted a secondary offering, including 3.5 million common shares, in favor of Soyuzneftegaz. After the additional share placement, Soyuzneftegaz’s stake in the share capital of Emerald Energy increased to 8.39% (5 million common shares). In 2009, the Chinese company Sinochem acquired Emerald Energy. The total deal value was estimated at $878 million.

== Anglo-Siberian Oil Company ==
Soyuzneftegaz held a stake in the London-based Anglo-Siberian Oil Company. In 2003, Rosneft acquired full ownership of the Anglo-Siberian Oil Company through a public bid on the London Stock Exchange, with the transaction amounting to US$76 million.

== See also ==
- Petroleum industry in Russia
