= Potevio =

Chinese manufacturing company

Potevio Group
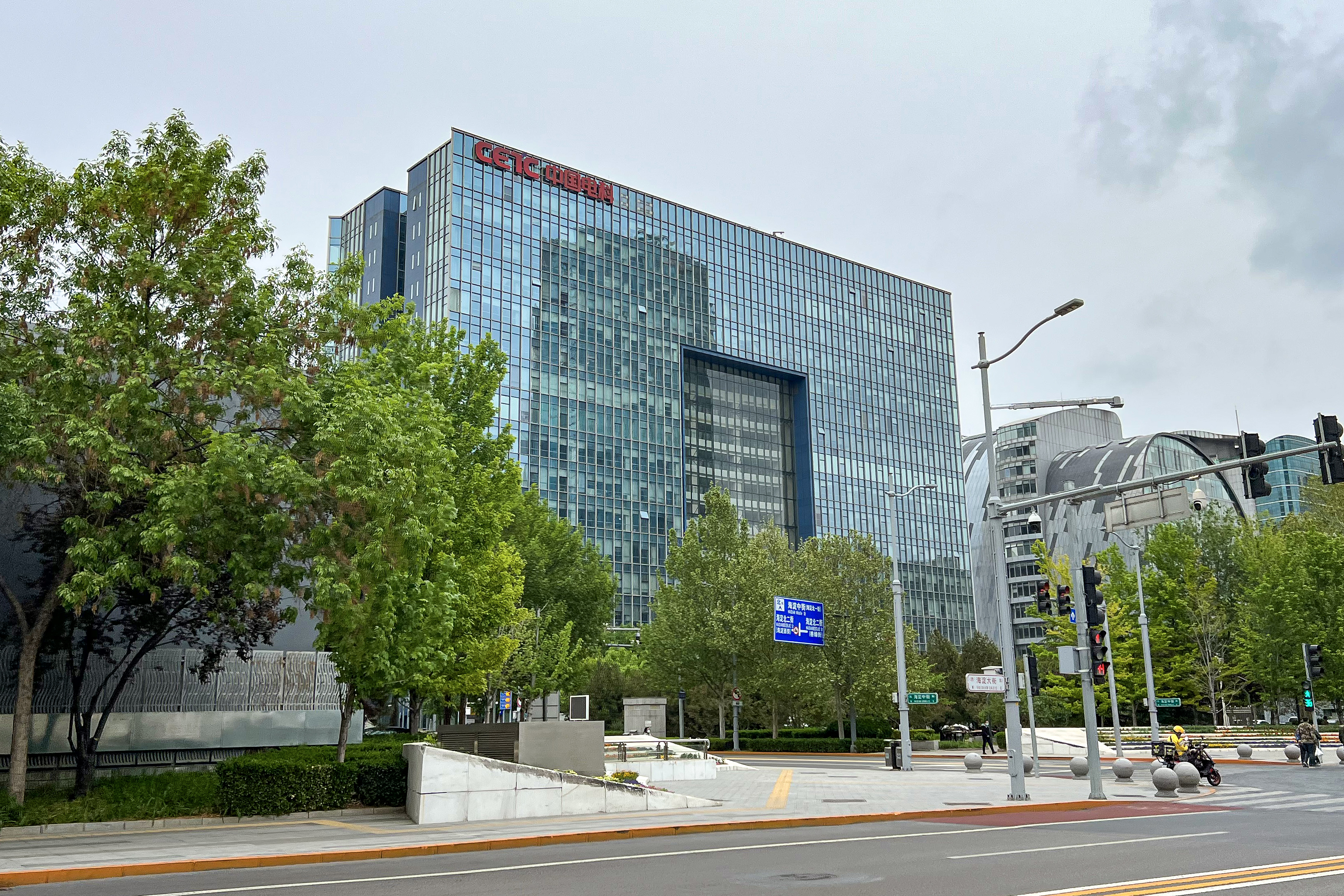
- Headquarters of Potevio in Zhongguancun, Beijing
- Formerly: PTIC
- Type: state-owned enterprise
- Founded: 1980
- Headquarters: Beijing, China
- Area served: mainland China
- Owner: Chinese Central Government
- Number of employees: 53,000
- Parent: China Electronics Technology Group
- Subsidiaries: Potevio Co., Ltd.

Potevio Group
- Simplified Chinese: 中国普天信息产业集团有限公司
Transcriptions

Potevio Co., Ltd.
- Simplified Chinese: 中国普天信息产业股份有限公司
Transcriptions

Potevio Group Corporation was a Chinese telecommunications hardware manufacturing company. It was one of the state-owned enterprises that was supervised by the State-owned Assets Supervision and Administration Commission of the State Council. Potevio Group Corporation is the parent company of Potevio Co., Ltd..

In 2021, it was reported that Potevio had been absorbed into China Electronics Technology Group (CETC).

== Subsidiaries ==
Potevio Group is the parent company of 5 listed companies: Shanghai Potevio (SSE:600680), Eastern Communications (SSE:600776), Nanjing Putian Telecommunications (SZSE:200468), Chengdu Putian Telecommunication Cables (HKEX:1202) and Eastcompeace Technology (SZSE:002017).

== Controversies ==
As of 2015, Potevio Group's subsidiary Potevio Co., Ltd. owned 39.04% stake of Puhua Investment as the largest shareholder. Puhua Investment was infamously linked to Xiao Jianhua as part of his business empire, Tomorrow series of companies (Chinese: 明天系), who brought the Pacific Securities to float in the Shanghai Stock Exchange.

Puhua Investment was a minority shareholder of another securities broker New Times Securities, which was part of the Tomorrow series of companies.
