= Niu Yuru =

Chinese politician

- 牛玉儒

Personal details
- Born: 1952-11 Tongliao, Zhelimu, Inner Mongolia, China
- Died: 2004-8-14 Beijing, China
- Party: Chinese Communist Party
- Spouse: Xie Li (谢莉)
- Education: Cadre Training Class, Minzu University of China (1978.02–1979.07); Inner Mongolia Administrative Cadre College, Administrative Management (1987.09–1989.11); Master's coursework in Commercial Economics, Dongbei University of Finance and Economics (1994.09–1997.07)
- Occupation: Politician

Niu Yuru (1952 – August 14, 2004) was a Chinese politician of Mongol ethnicity. He was born in Tongliao, Inner Mongolia, and was originally from Fuxin, Liaoning Province. Throughout his career, he served in various important positions including Secretary-General of the Inner Mongolia Autonomous Region Government, Mayor of Baotou, Vice Chairman of the Inner Mongolia Autonomous Regional Committee of the Chinese Communist Party and CCP Hohhot Municipal Committee. Niu died at the age of 52 in August 2004 due to illness resulting from years of overwork. He was widely recognized within the Party as a model of integrity, diligence, and outstanding public service.

== Biography ==
=== Early life and career ===
In May 1970, Niu began working as a sent-down youth in the countryside. In December 1971, he became a clerk and staff member at the Zhelimu League Committee Office in Jilin Province. He joined the Chinese Communist Party in 1975. By March 1977, he was appointed Party Secretary of the Molimiao Commune in Tongliao County, Jilin. In February 1978, he attended a training program at the Minzu University of China.

In July 1979, he served as the secretary of the Organization Department of the Zhelimu League League Committee of Inner Mongolia Autonomous Region. In May 1980, he was appointed secretary of the General Office of the Chairperson of Inner Mongolia. In March 1983, he was appointed secretary of the Discipline Inspection Commission of Inner Mongolia Autonomous Region. In January 1984, he was appointed Secretary General of the Commission for Discipline Inspection of Inner Mongolia Autonomous Region. In December 1984, he was appointed to the Standing Committee and Secretary-General of the Discipline Inspection Commission of Inner Mongolia Autonomous Region. In November 1989, he was appointed deputy Secretary-General of the Inner Mongolia Autonomous Region Government. In January 1992, he was appointed deputy secretary-general and Director of the General Office of the Inner Mongolia Autonomous Region Government. In May 1993, he was appointed secretary general of the Inner Mongolia Autonomous Region Government, member of the Party Group and secretary of the Party Group of the General Office. In November 1996, he was appointed Deputy Secretary of the CCP Baotou Municipal Committee and acting Mayor (elected mayor in April 1997). In February 2001, he was appointed vice chairman and member of the Party Group of the Inner Mongolia Autonomous Region Government. In April 2003, he was appointed member of the Standing Committee of the Inner Mongolia Autonomous Regional Committee of the Chinese Communist Party and secretary of the CCP Hohhot Municipal Committee.

On August 14, 2004, he died in Beijing at the age of 52.

== Achievements ==
During his tenure as Mayor of Baotou, Niu Yuru oversaw state-owned enterprise reform and economic restructuring. He played a key role in forming several large enterprise groups and facilitated the public listing of companies such as Baotou Rare Earth Hi-Tech, Baotou Tomorrow Technology, Huazi Industrial, Ganglian Co., and Beifang Heavy Duty Truck. Taking advantage of the post-earthquake reconstruction efforts in Baotou, he promoted urban transformation and development. A number of major urban infrastructure projects were implemented, resulting in significant improvements in the city's appearance and living conditions. Under his leadership, Baotou received numerous national honors, including awards for urban greening, housing reform, and affordable housing projects. The city was also recognized by the United Nations Human Settlements Programme with the “2000 Best Practices Award for Improving the Living Environment.” While serving in the government of the Inner Mongolia Autonomous Region, Niu was responsible for areas including the China Western Development strategy, foreign trade and opening-up, commercial circulation, and legal affairs. He led the drafting of the Strategic Plan for Implementing the Western Development Program in Inner Mongolia Autonomous Region. As Party Secretary of Hohhot, the capital of Inner Mongolia, the city's GDP growth rate climbed to the forefront among Inner Mongolia's cities and among 27 provincial capitals nationwide. Municipal construction was significantly improved, and the overall cityscape was noticeably enhanced. He also presided over two major conferences on the promotion of both material and cultural progress.

== Awards and honors ==
- The Central Commission for Discipline Inspection , the Organization Department of the Chinese Communist Party, the Publicity Department of the Chinese Communist Party, and the Central Leading Group for Education on Maintaining the Advanced Nature of Communist Party Members issued the Decision on Carrying out Activities to Learn from Comrade Niu Yuru.
- Selected by China Central Television (CCTV) as one of the “Touching China Annual Person of the Year Award” in 2004.

== Publicity campaigns ==
A national reporting effort was initiated with the topic "A Good Cadre of the Party, A Close Friend of the People." The campaign was orchestrated by the Central Commission for Discipline Inspection, the Organization Department, the Publicity Department, the Advanced Nature Education Leadership Group, and the CCP Inner Mongolia Committee. Since November 30, 2004, the reporting team has conducted nine public presentations in places like as Beijing, Liaoning, Shandong, Shanghai, Guangdong, Shaanxi, Chongqing, and Inner Mongolia.

=== Related media ===
- TV Drama: Niu Yuru
- Film: Life and Death: Niu Yuru
