= CETC =

- China Electronics Technology Group Corporation, a state-owned company established in 2002 by People's Republic of China
- Chambres extraordinaires au sein des tribunaux cambodgiens, commonly known as the Khmer Rouge Tribunal, established in 1997 to prosecute genociders of the former Khmer Rouge regime
- Circulating Epithelial Tumor Cell
- Canadian Ethnic Cleansing Team, a racist hate group in Canada, prosecuted by the Canadian Human Rights Tribunal (CHRT) in 2015.
