= Lu Jun =

Lu Jun may refer to:

- Lu Jun (referee) (born 1959), Chinese football referee
- Lu Jun (engineer) (born 1964), Chinese electronic engineer
- Lü Jun (born 1967), Chinese executive, chairman of COFCO Group
