= Gore–Chernomyrdin Commission =

US–Russian joint commission

The Gore–Chernomyrdin Commission, or U.S.–Russian Joint Commission on Economic and Technological Cooperation, was a United States and Russian Joint Commission developed to increase cooperation between the two countries in several different areas. The commission was developed by the United States’ president Bill Clinton and Russian president Boris Yeltsin at a summit in Vancouver in April 1993. Al Gore, the United States vice president, and Viktor Chernomyrdin, the Russian prime minister, were appointed as co-chairmen and the committee derives its name from those two individuals. Before his appointment to the commission, Chernomyrdin oversaw the Soviet national oil industry as minister from 1985 to 1989. After the fall of the Soviet Union, Chernomyrdin organized the Soviet oil industry into the Gazprom corporation.

== Aims ==
The Gore–Chernomyrdin Commission was formed in order to promote cooperation between Russia and the United States on issues of space exploration, energy, trade and business development, defense conversion, science and technology, health, agriculture, and environment.

=== Space Exploration ===
The U.S. and Russia agreed to cooperate in terms of space exploration by working more as a team, rather than against one another. The U.S. and Russia agreed on several occasions to attempt to build one space station together, the International Space Station, to further improve space shuttle designs, and cooperative U.S. and Russian space technology research. The leaders of the space cooperation agreements of the Gore–Chernomyrdin Commission included NASA Administrator Daniel Goldin and General Director of the Russian Space Agency Yuri Koptev.

=== Energy ===
The energy agreements and policies of the Gore–Chernomyrdin Commission were facilitated by Secretary of Energy Hazel O'Leary and Minister of Fuel and Energy Yuri Shafranik. These agreements included increasing the safety of nuclear reactors, increasing the efficiency and productivity of Russian natural gas extraction, and also ties into the environmental policies on the Commission which included reducing pollution of the environment. The commission also prohibited the use of plutonium in nuclear weapons. The environmental policies were led by Environmental Protection Agency Administrator Carol Browner and Minister of Environmental Protection and Natural Resources Viktor Danilov-Danilyan.

=== Trade and Business ===
The United States and Russian trade and business agreements included methods to increase the financial strength of both countries. The U.S. hoped to increase investment in the Russian economy, while also hoping to open U.S. businesses in Russia. The two countries also attempted to create a private Russian gasoline corporation, in hopes of determining the most effective conditions for prosperity of such a company. The trade and business policies were aided by Secretary of Commerce Ron Brown and Deputy Prime Minister and Minister of Foreign Economic Relations Oleg Davydov.

=== Defense Conversion ===
The defense conversion policies were led by Secretary of Defense William J. Perry, First Deputy Minister of Defense, Andrei Kokoshin, and First Deputy Minister of the Economy, Valeriy Makhailov. These policies attempted to convert military production away from the government to civilian production. These efforts were large financial endeavors.

=== Science and Technology ===
The sector of science and technology, run by OSTP Director Jack Gibbons and Minister of Science Boris G. Saltykov, included improvements of highways systems and other transportation issues, biological research, geological research, engineering, and oil and natural gas research. The health policies of the Commission included improvement of health education and treatments, as well as health policies and reforms, and were led by Secretary of Health Donna Shalala and Minister of Health and Medical Industry Eduard Nechayev.

=== Agribusiness ===
One of the later forming committees was that of Agribusiness. The Agribusiness committee included improvement of the agriculture industry in terms of production and trade. This committee was led by Secretary of Agriculture Dan Glickman and Deputy Prime Minister Aleksandr Zaveryukha.

== Abuses of the Commission ==
In the early 1990s, the United States government gave responsibility to the Harvard Institute for International Development to help the Russian government transition from a public economy to a private economy. The Harvard Project was led by Andrei Shleifer and Jonathan Hay. Anatoly Chubais, a Russian economist, politician, and businessman represented Russia in privatization effort. This group of individuals had a great deal of power and influence over the privatization process. As part of their privatization strategy, Chubais, Shleifer, and Hays (along with several others) used their insider access to different types of information to limit that information to their private network, enriching themselves and many others in the process (see Russian oligarchs). One of the committees on which the members of this small group sat was the Gore–Chernomyrdin Commission, which Janine Wedel describes as follows

"Members of the intertwined Chubais–Harvard network appointed each other to visible binational posts in economic, energy, and high tech areas. They arranged for each other to be well represented on the high-level Gore–Chernomyrdin Commission ... which helped to facilitate cooperation on U.S.–Russian oil deals and the Mir Space Station, among other issues."
