= Leonid Roketsky =

Ukrainian-Russian statesman (born 1942)

- Леонид Рокецкий
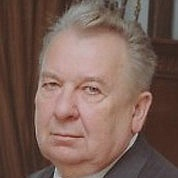

Member of the Federation Council from the legislative body of the Taimyr (Dolgan-Nenets) Autonomous Okrug
- In office 8 June 2001 – 19 September 2007
- Preceded by: Viktor Sitnov
- Succeeded by: Position abolished

2nd Governor of Tyumen Oblast
- In office 12 January 1993 – 26 January 2001
- Preceded by: Yuri Shafranik
- Succeeded by: Sergey Sobyanin

First Deputy Head of Administration of the Tyumen Oblast
- In office November 1991 – 12 January 1993
- Governor: Yuri Shafranik

Personal details
- Born: Leonid Yulianovich Roketsky; 15 March 1942 (age 84) Nosiv, Ternopil Oblast, Ukrainian SSR, Soviet Union
- Party: United Russia (since 2001)

Leonid Yulianovich Roketsky (Russian: Леонид Юлианович Рокецкий; born on 15 March 1942), is a Ukrainian-born Russian statesman, who last served as the Member of the Federation Council from the legislative body of the Taimyr (Dolgano-Nenets) Autonomous Okrug from 2001 until its abolishment in 2007.

He had served as the 2nd governor of Tyumen Oblast from 1993 to 2001, and had been the chairman of the executive committee of the Tyumen Regional Council of People's Deputies from 1990 to 1991.

He is and Honored Builder of the Russian Federation as of 1999, and is the Laureate of the State Prize of the Russian Federation awarded in 1999.

== Biography ==
=== Early life ===
Leonid Roketsky was born in Nosiv, Ukraine on 15 March 1942. to a peasant family. Son of Yulian Lvovich, he was the eldest among four brothers.

After graduating from school and college, he worked as a projectionist in his native village. In November 1962 he was drafted into the Soviet Army in Kuibyshev. After serving the army in 1966, he studied at the Lvov Polytechnic Institute, majoring in electrical engineering. As part of student teams, he ended up in Surgut.

After receiving his diploma in 1970, he was invited to join the Ministry of Oil and Gas Construction. Until 1980, he became a specialist in the oil and gas industry, successively passing through such career stages as foreman, engineer, chief engineer and manager of the Surgutgazstroy trust.

=== Political career ===
Since 1982, he worked as first deputy chairman and then chairman of the Surgut City Executive Committee. In April 1990, he was elected chairman of the Tyumen Regional Executive Committee, deputy of the Tyumen Oblast Council of People's Deputies, and member of the regional committee of the CPSU.

In August 1991, Roketsky supported Boris Yeltsin, and in November he became first deputy head of the administration of the Tyumen Oblast.

On 12 January 1993, Roketsky was appointed as acting Governor of Tyumen Oblast. He formally took office on 12 February. He was involved in the reform of local self-government, agriculture, and the problem of the unity of the region a complex subject of the federation, which includes independent northern districts (Khanty-Mansiysk and Yamalo-Nenets).

On 12 December 1993, he was elected to the Federation Council of the Federal Assembly of the Russian Federation. In the Federation Council he was a member of the Committee on Federation Affairs, the Federal Treaty and Regional Policy.

In January 1997, he became a member of the Political Council of the “Our Home – Russia” party.

On 2 September 2000 he was appointed a member of the Presidium of the State Council of the Russian Federation.

On 14 January 2001, Roketsky lost the election to Sergey Sobyanin, which on 28 January, Roketsky transferred his powers to his successor. He remained as the Member of the Federation Council from the Tyumen Oblast until 27 February.

On 30 January, he became a member of the State Council of the Russia on a personal basis, while remaining a member of the Presidium of the State Council until 12 March.

On 8 June, he became a representative of the Taymyr Autonomous Okrug Duma in the Federation Council. In February 2007, he resigned due to the liquidation of the Taimyr (Dolgano-Nenets) Autonomous Okrug, which was officially abolished on 17 September.
