= Feicheng =

Feicheng city 肥城市
- County-level city
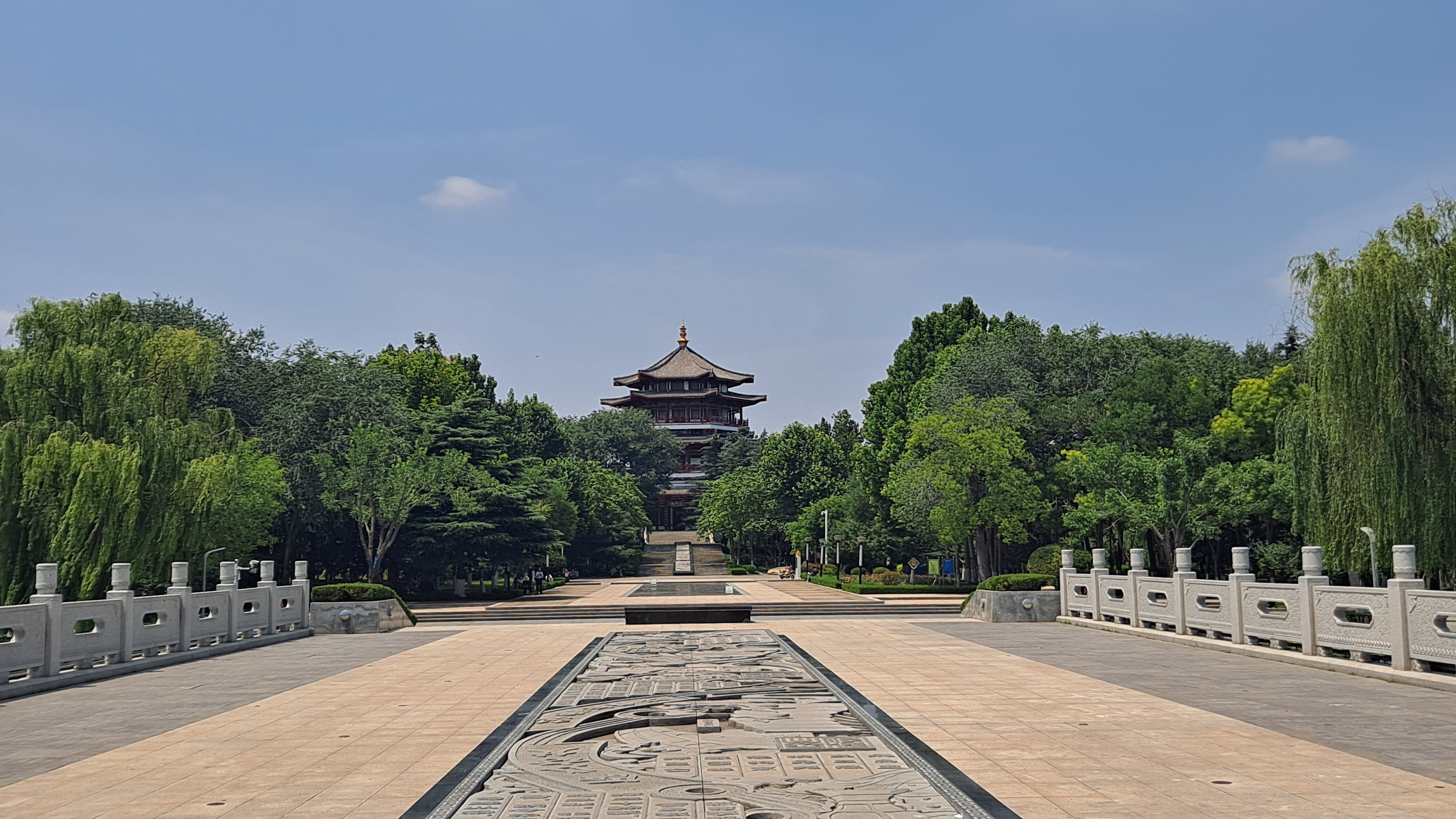
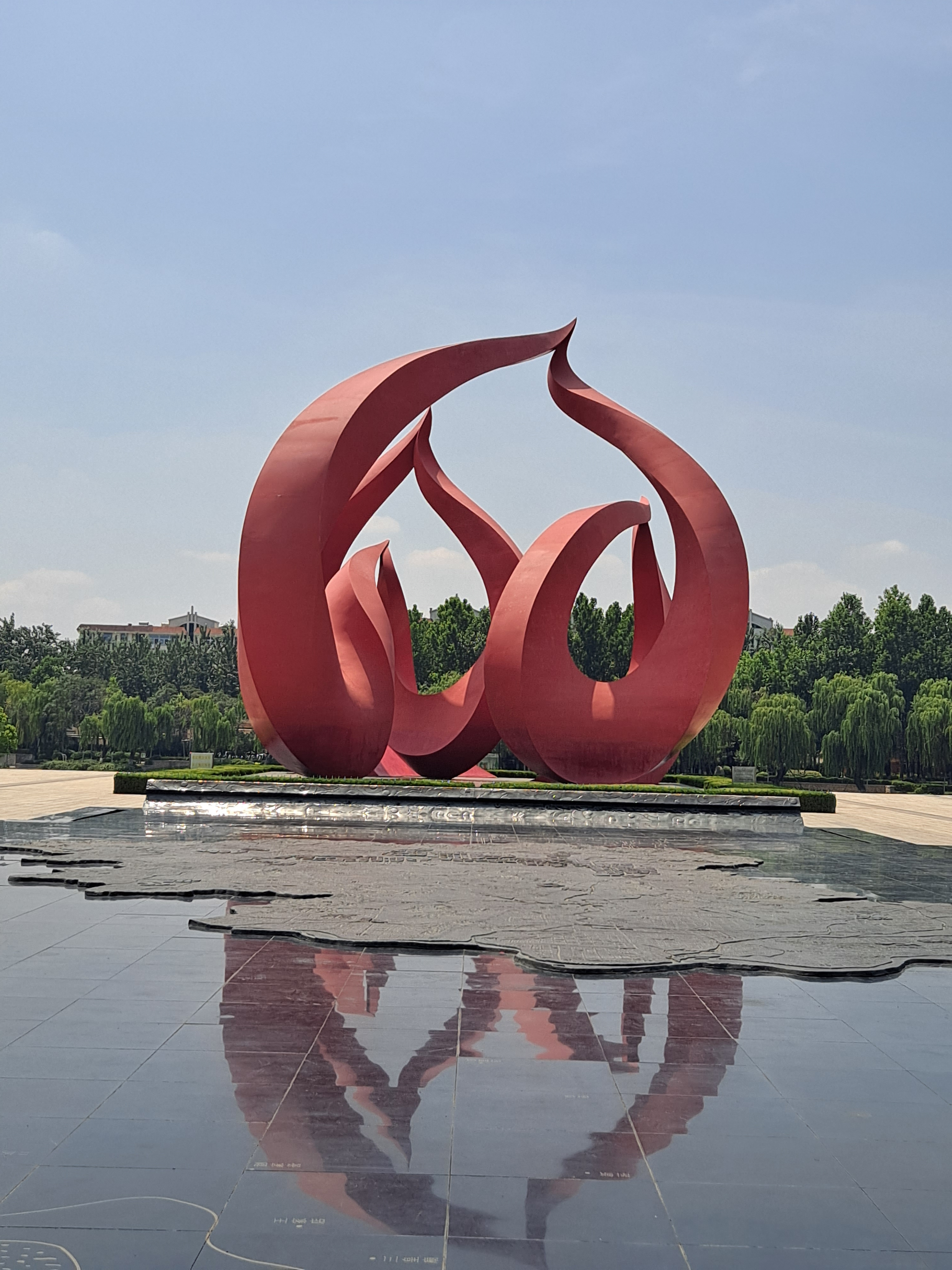
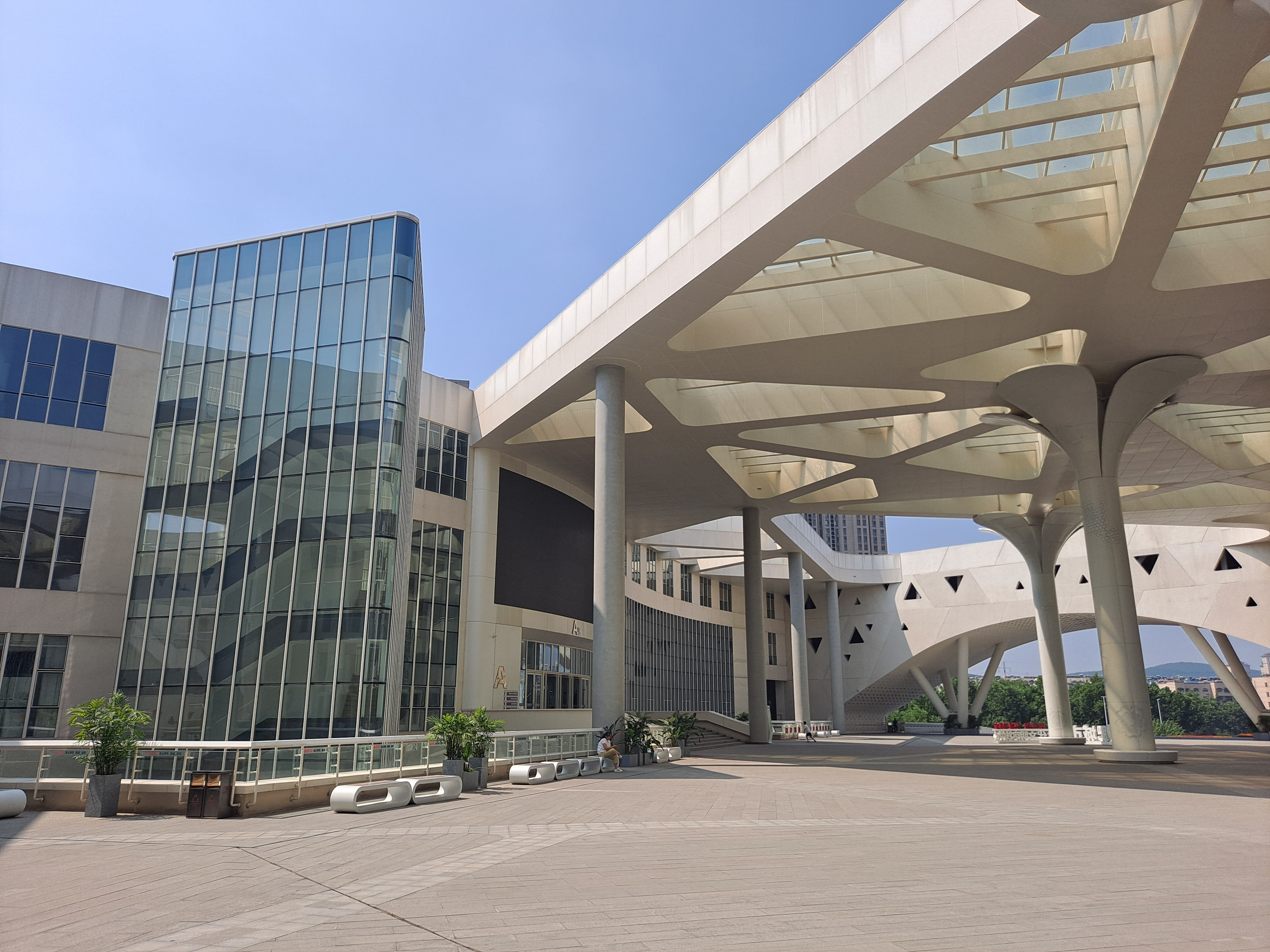
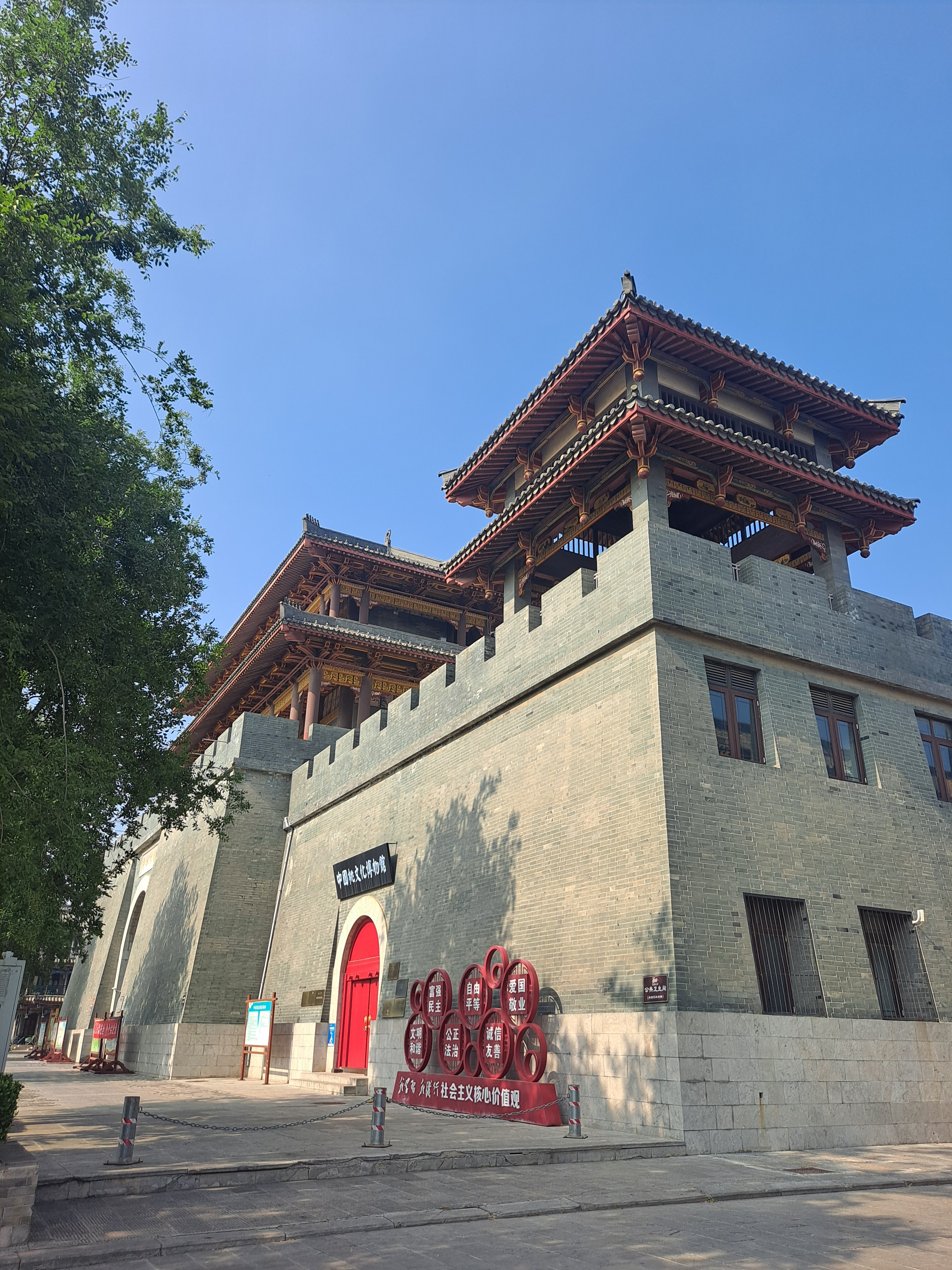
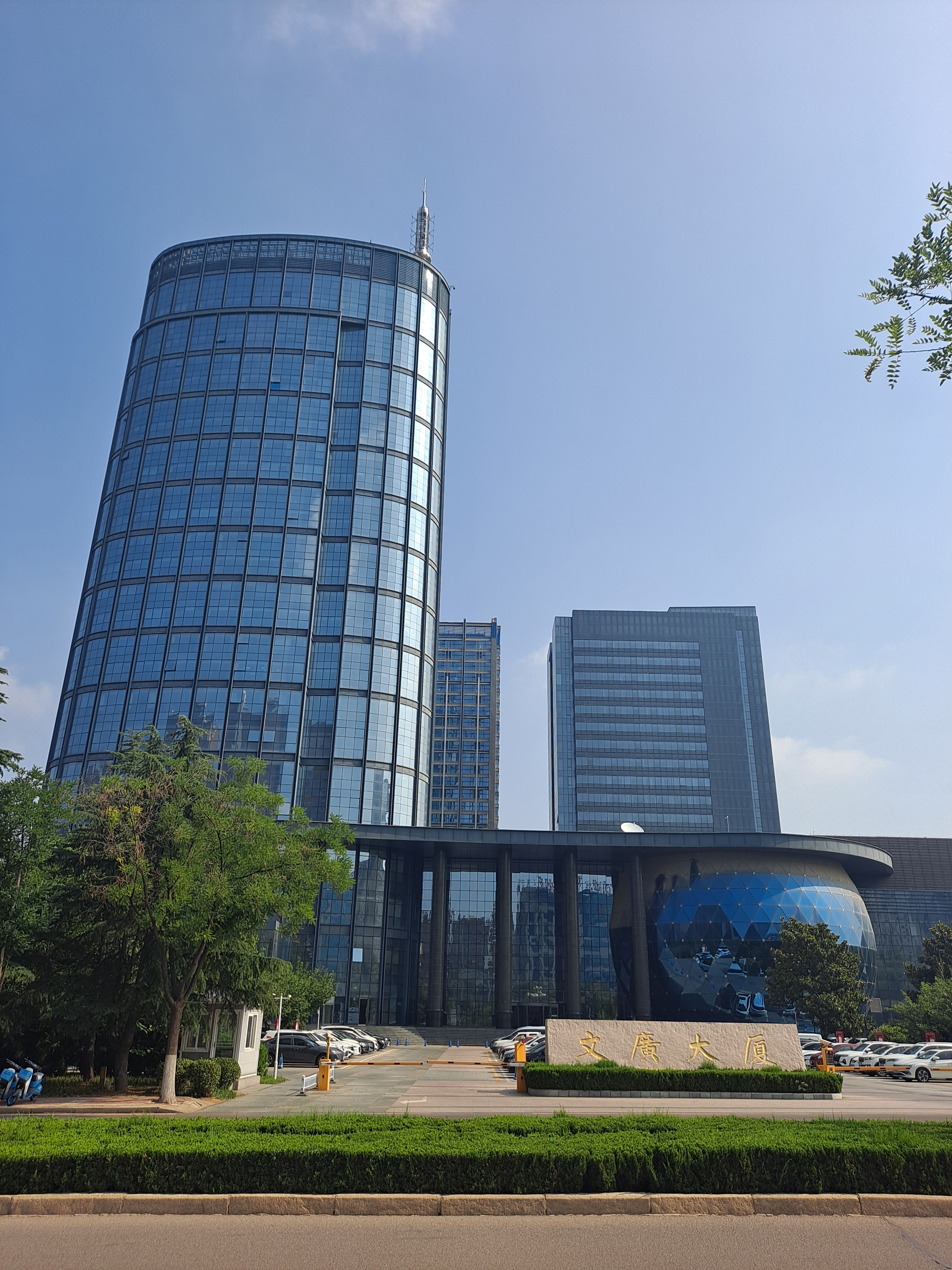
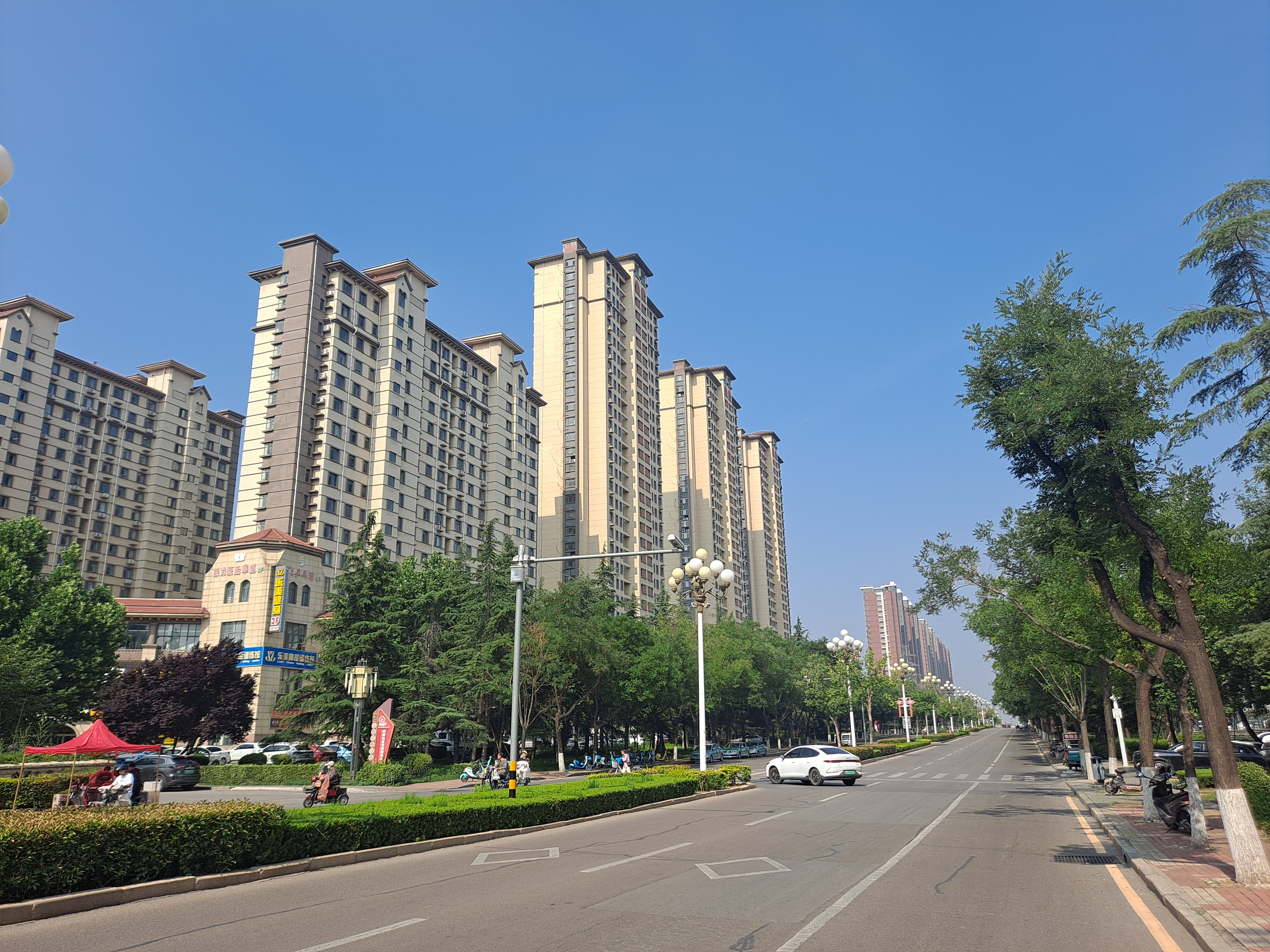
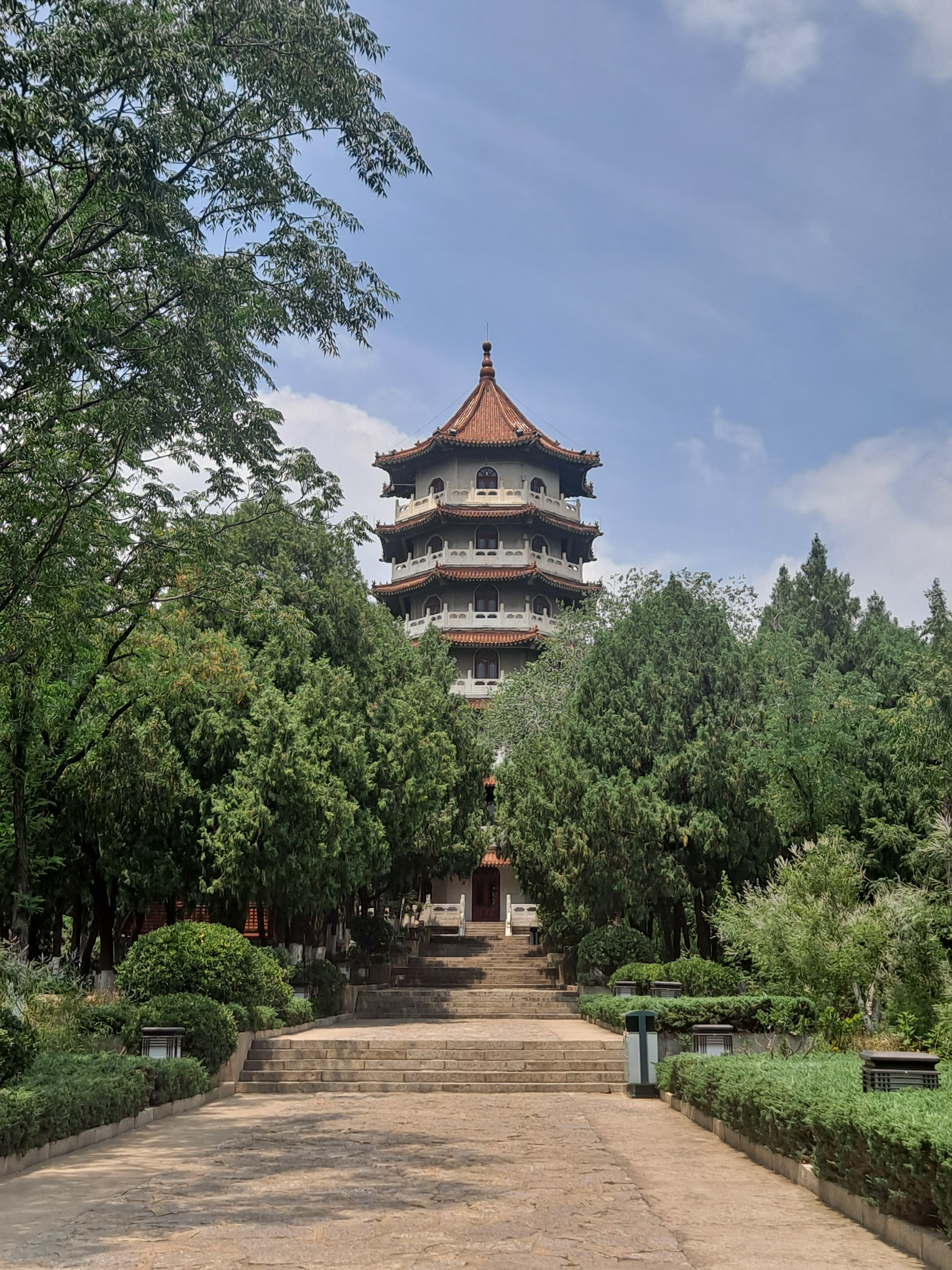
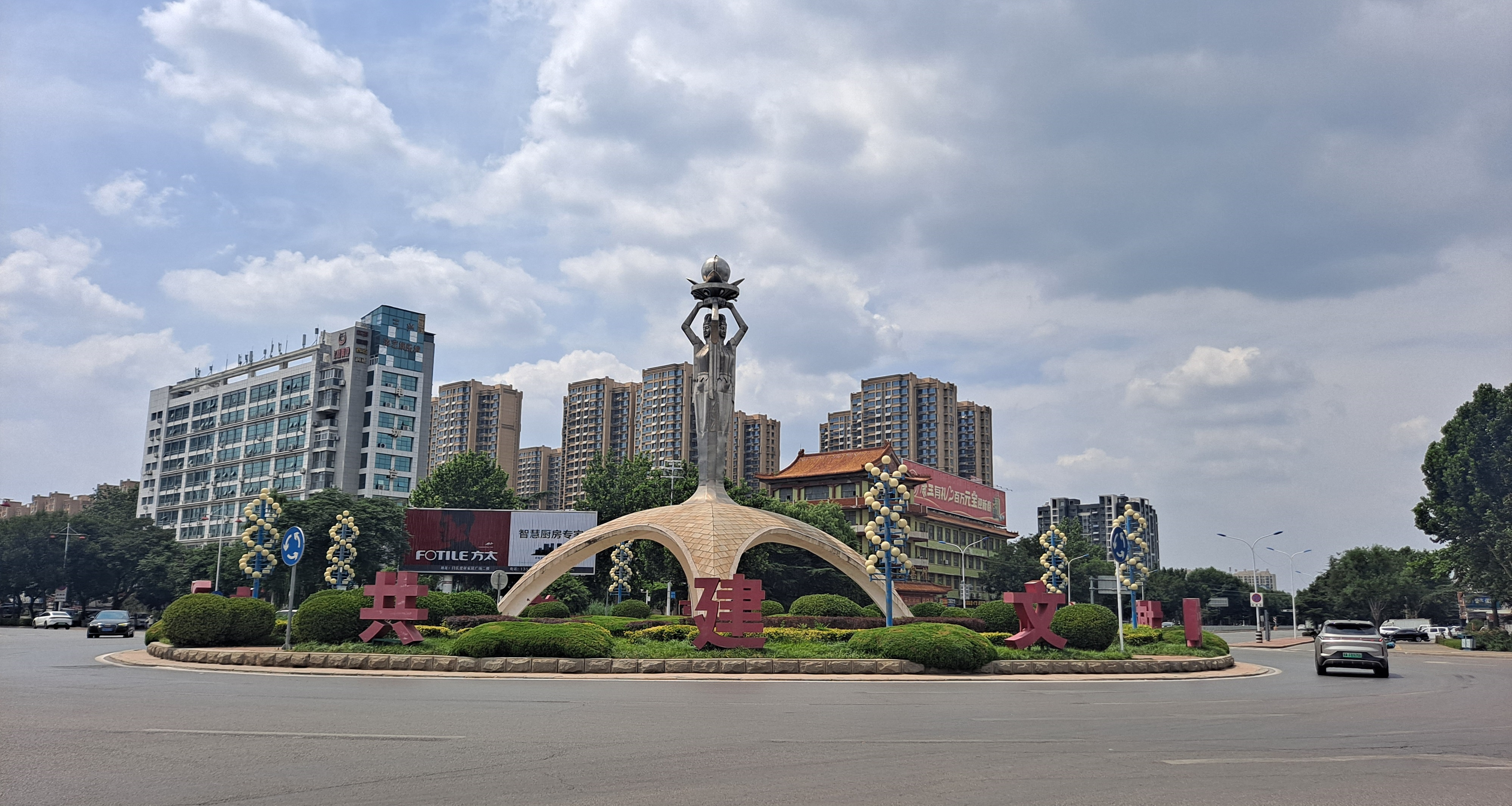
- Qingfeng Pavilion Feicheng Civic Square Feicheng Civic Center Spring and Autumn Ancient Town Wenguang Building Longshan Road Longshan Tower Feicheng City Center

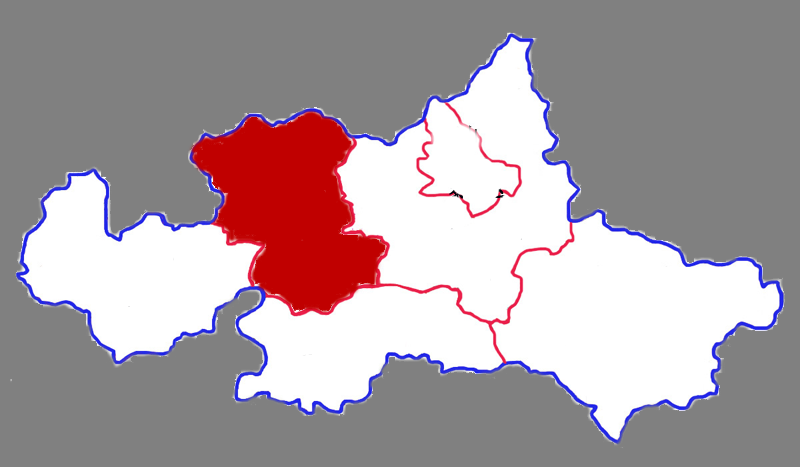
- Location in Tai'an

- Location in Shandong
- Coordinates: 36°11′10″N 116°46′19″E
- Country: People's Republic of China
- Province: Shandong
- Prefecture-level city: Tai'an

Area
  - Total: 1,277 km^{2} (493 sq mi)

Dimensions
  - Length: 48 km (30 mi)
  - Width: 37.5 km (23.3 mi)
- Highest elevation (Mount Jianyun (翦云山)): 607.7 m (1,994 ft)
- Lowest elevation: 57.7 m (189 ft)

Population (2019)
  - Total: 968,100
  - Density: 758.1/km^{2} (1,963/sq mi)
- Time zone: UTC+8 (China Standard)
- Postal code: 271600
- Website: www.feicheng.gov.cn

Feicheng (Chinese: 肥城; pinyin: Féichéng) is a county-level city under the administration of Tai'an City in the west of Shandong Province, China. As of 2017, the population was 992,000. Part of the Great Wall of Qi starts here and is listed on the People's Republic of China's list of cultural artifacts.

Feicheng City has a relatively developed economy, ranking among the top 100 counties in China since 2006 and 76th in 2018. In 2017, Feicheng's GDP was 80.88 billion yuan, and its per capita GDP was 83,476.1 yuan, higher than the average level of Shandong Province and Tai'an City. Its most famous specialty is Feicheng peach, which was a royal tribute in the Ming and Qing dynasties and sold overseas at the end of the Qing Dynasty. Feicheng is the principal peach-producing district of the Northern Group. The Peach Blossom Festival is held every year in Feicheng City. In 1995, Feicheng City was recognized by the Chinese Ministry of Agriculture as the "Hometown of Chinese Buddha peach", and in 2000, Feicheng Peach Garden set a Guinness World Record as the "largest peach garden in the world".

Billionaire businessman Xiao Jianhua grew up in Feicheng.

== Administrative divisions ==
As of 2012, this city is divided to 3 subdistricts and 11 towns.

Subdistricts

- Xincheng Subdistrict (新城街道)
- Laocheng Subdistrict (老城街道)
- Wangguadian Subdistrict (王瓜店街道)

Towns

- Chaoquan (潮泉镇)
- Hutun (湖屯镇)
- Shiheng (石横镇)
- Taoyuan (桃园镇)
- Wangzhuang (王庄镇)
- Yiyang (仪阳镇)
- Anzhan(安站镇)
- Sunbo (孙伯镇)
- Anzhuang (安庄镇)
- Bianyuan (边院镇)
- Wenyang (汶阳镇)

== Climate ==
Climate data for Feicheng, elevation 114 m (374 ft), (1991–2020 normals, extremes 1981–2010)
Month	Jan	Feb	Mar	Apr	May	Jun	Jul	Aug	Sep	Oct	Nov	Dec	Year
Record high °C (°F)	16.5 (61.7)	20.5 (68.9)	28.4 (83.1)	33.2 (91.8)	36.0 (96.8)	41.3 (106.3)	42.1 (107.8)	37.1 (98.8)	37.0 (98.6)	34.2 (93.6)	25.2 (77.4)	18.3 (64.9)	42.1 (107.8)
Mean daily maximum °C (°F)	4.5 (40.1)	8.3 (46.9)	14.5 (58.1)	21.3 (70.3)	26.9 (80.4)	31.4 (88.5)	31.8 (89.2)	30.6 (87.1)	27.0 (80.6)	21.1 (70.0)	12.9 (55.2)	6.1 (43.0)	19.7 (67.5)
Daily mean °C (°F)	−1.3 (29.7)	2.2 (36.0)	8.4 (47.1)	15.2 (59.4)	20.9 (69.6)	25.6 (78.1)	27.1 (80.8)	25.7 (78.3)	21.2 (70.2)	14.6 (58.3)	7.0 (44.6)	0.5 (32.9)	13.9 (57.1)
Mean daily minimum °C (°F)	−5.7 (21.7)	−2.5 (27.5)	2.9 (37.2)	9.3 (48.7)	14.9 (58.8)	20.1 (68.2)	23.0 (73.4)	21.8 (71.2)	16.4 (61.5)	9.5 (49.1)	2.4 (36.3)	−3.8 (25.2)	9.0 (48.2)
Record low °C (°F)	−19.1 (−2.4)	−17.2 (1.0)	−12.4 (9.7)	−5.1 (22.8)	0.7 (33.3)	9.2 (48.6)	16.2 (61.2)	12.0 (53.6)	4.9 (40.8)	−2.9 (26.8)	−14.2 (6.4)	−17.1 (1.2)	−19.1 (−2.4)
Average precipitation mm (inches)	5.0 (0.20)	9.6 (0.38)	12.0 (0.47)	32.8 (1.29)	57.4 (2.26)	79.2 (3.12)	174.8 (6.88)	160.7 (6.33)	60.0 (2.36)	25.5 (1.00)	22.3 (0.88)	7.1 (0.28)	646.4 (25.45)
Average precipitation days (≥ 0.1 mm)	2.2	3.0	3.0	5.2	6.7	8.3	11.4	10.9	7.2	5.3	4.6	2.8	70.6
Average snowy days	2.3	2.4	0.8	0.2	0	0	0	0	0	0	0.7	1.8	8.2
Average relative humidity (%)	59	55	52	56	60	61	77	81	74	68	67	63	64
Mean monthly sunshine hours	148.5	155.9	207.2	228.2	252.8	225.7	187.0	188.6	185.3	183.7	156.9	152.3	2,272.1
Percentage possible sunshine	48	50	56	58	58	52	42	46	50	53	52	51	51
Source: China Meteorological Administration
