= Taian Taishan Investment =

- Company type: state-owned enterprise
- Founded: 10 March 2006
- Headquarters: Tai'an, Shandong, China
- Revenue: ▼CN¥2.903 billion (2015)
- Operating income: ▲CN¥65 million (2015)
- Net income: ▼CN¥247 million (2015)
- Total assets: ▲CN¥58.716 billion (2015)
- Total equity: ▲CN¥19.553 billion (2015)
- Owner: Tai'an Municipal People's Government; (via Tai'an Finance Bureau (100%))
- Parent: Tai'an Finance Bureau
- Footnotes / references in consolidated financial statement

Taian Taishan Investment
- Simplified Chinese: 泰安市泰山投资
- Traditional Chinese: 泰安市泰山投資
Transcriptions

Taian Taishan Investment Co., Ltd. is a Chinese sovereign wealth fund of Tai'an, Shandong Province. The sole shareholder of the company was Tai'an Finance Bureau (since 2014, in the past Tai'an's State-owned Assets Supervision and Administration Commission). Despite not listed, the company issued bonds to finance in 2011 and again in 2013 for a total of CN¥2.8 billion.

== Subsidiaries ==
- Taian Fund Investment & Guaranty (100%)

== Equity investments ==
As of 31 December 2015

- Taian Bank (30.01% combined)
- Bank of Communications (0.03%)
- China National Materials (8.67%)

== Former portfolio ==
- Puhua Investment (20.00%)
