= Pacific Securities =

Chinese investment bank and brokerage firm

- Company type: Public
- Traded as: SSE: 601099; SSE MidCap Component
- Industry: Financial services
- Predecessor: Yunnan Securities
- Founded: 2004
- Headquarters: China
- Area served: Mainland China; North America; Southeast Asia
- Key people: Zheng Yanan (Chairman)
- Services: Asset management; Investment banking; Brokerage; Direct investment
- Revenue: ▲CN¥2.743 billion (2015)
- Operating income: ▲CN¥1.442 billion (2015)
- Net income: ▲CN¥1.133 billion (2015)
- Total assets: ▲CN¥34.092 billion (2015)
- Total equity: ▲CN¥7.402 billion (2015)
- Website: tpyzq.com
- Footnotes / references in a consolidated basis, excluding minority interest

The Pacific Securities Co., Ltd.
- Simplified Chinese: 太平洋证券股份有限公司
- Traditional Chinese: 太平洋證券股份有限公司
Transcriptions
Standard Mandarin
- Hanyu Pinyin: Tàipíngyáng zhèngquàn gǔfèn yǒuxiàn gōngsī

Pacific Securities
- Simplified Chinese: 太平洋证券
- Traditional Chinese: 太平洋證券
Transcriptions
Standard Mandarin
- Hanyu Pinyin: Tàipíngyáng zhèngquàn

Second alternative Chinese name
- Simplified Chinese: 太平洋
- Traditional Chinese: 太平洋
- Literal meaning: Pacific
Transcriptions
Standard Mandarin
- Hanyu Pinyin: Tàipíngyáng

Third alternative Chinese name
- Simplified Chinese: 太证
- Traditional Chinese: 太證
Transcriptions
Standard Mandarin
- Hanyu Pinyin: Tàizhèng

The Pacific Securities Co., Ltd. is a Chinese investment bank and brokerage firm. The company is listed on the Shanghai Stock Exchange.

As of 28 November 2016, The Pacific Securities is a constituent of CSI 300 Index (and mid-cap sub-index CSI 200 Index) and SSE 180 Index.

The company controls a SPAC listed on NASDAQ. The company also owns 39% stake in Lao-China Securities, a company based in Vientiane, capital and largest city of Laos.

== History ==
The Pacific Securities was founded in 2004 and received the clients of bankrupted Yunnan Securities. In April 2007 it was converted to company limited by shares, with a nominal value of CN¥1 each.

It was reported that Xiao Jianhua was behind the operation on listing the company to Shanghai Stock Exchange in 2007. Irregularity was founded after, by-then vice-governor of China Development Bank, Wang Yi (Chinese: 王益) was arrested. Wang was the vice-chairman of China Securities Regulatory Commission (CSRC) until 1999.

In December 2007, the largest shareholder of the Pacific Securities was the consortium of Beijing Ximeng Real Estate (13.34%), Beijing Huaxin Liuhe Investment (13.20%), China Foreign Economy and Trade Trust (FOTIC, 10.00%), UOB Mainland Investment (Note: No official English name was known, English translation was for indication only.) (6.67%), (Note: Chinese: 大华大陆投资, A company 40.1% owned by Chinascholars Group (SZSE: 000547, now known as Addsino) and 19.9% by UOB Venture Management (Shanghai) (Chinese: 优欧弼投资管理(上海)), a wholly owned subsidiary of United Overseas Bank; the rest (40%) was owned by a private company (Chinese: 北京新荣拓展投资管理).) Yunnan State-Owned Assets Management (3.33%) and CMST Development (SSE: 600787, 3.33%). The Pacific Securities also exchanged its shares with the shares of Unida (former code SSE: 600181), a company delisted in 2007. Other major shareholders were Puhua Investment (10.00%), Taishan Xiangsheng (10.00%), "China Energy Development Electricity (Group)" (Note: the Chinese name was changed from Chinese: 中能发展电力(集团) to Chinese: 中能发展实业 in 2011; according to the National Enterprise Credit Information Publicity System, it was 40% owned by a wholly owned subsidiary (Chinese: 中节能科技投资) of state-owned China Energy Conservation and Environmental Protection Group until mid-2014.) (6.67%) and "Heilongjiang Century Huarong Investment Management" (5.77%) Those shareholders owned 82.31% shares, with 36 months restriction to sell.

5 out of 6 companies renewed the shareholders' agreement in March 2010 (FOTIC withdrew), as well as "Yunnan State-Owned Assets Management" transferred part of its stake to another Yunnan Government-owned company: Yunnan Industrial Investment Group (Chinese: 云南省工业投资控股集团). The consortium owned 39.88% shares of the company as the largest shareholder, as well as the chairman of the Pacific Securities, Zheng Yanan (Chinese: 郑亚南), was also the chairman of UOB Mainland Investment. However, the consortium sold most of their shares since 2011 (decreased to 32.68% in December 2011, 25.38% in December 2012).

The shareholders' agreement was expired again in March 2013, which only Huaxin Liuhe increased its shares (from 10.83% to 10.89%), as well as Yunnan Industrial Investment Group retained its 3.19% shares; Beijing Ximeng Real Estate, UOB Mainland Investment and CMST Development sold their 7.62%, 2.31% and 1.42% shares to 3.79%, 0.31% and unknown level respectively. It was reported that Pacific Securities was ranked the least among the listed "securities firms" of China, in term of revenue of the first half of 2013.

In 2012 the Pacific Securities founded a joint venture in Laos.

In April 2014 the company recapitalized for CN¥3.759 billion (CN¥5.37 each) by a non-public offering. Each old share also received 0.5 new share in December that year (by converting the share premium into share capital), making the share capital had increase from 1,653,644,684 to 3,530,467,026.

== Shareholders ==
As of 31 December 2015, the only shareholder with more than 5% shares was Beijing Huaxin Liuhe Investment for 12.75% (450,248,500). Despite 225 million of them were restricted to sell (until 21 April 2019), more than half of its shares (251,020,000) were pledged (Chinese: 质押), to China Fortune International Trust (160 million restricted shares) since December 2015, to China Merchants Securities (51.98 million free-floating shares) since March–April 2015, as well as pledged to other companies. The shares pledged to China Merchants Securities, all of them were also pledged to the same investment bank from March 2014 to February 2015 (108 million shares free-floating shares); the shares pledged to China Fortune International Trust, were also pledged to New China Fushi from April 2014 to November–December 2015 (225 million restricted shares).

The second largest shareholder (Chinese: 大连天盛硕博科技), which owned 4.25% shares (150 million), is a private company based in Dalian. The company bought 100 million number of shares from non-public offering for CN¥5.37 each (before 0.5 additional new shares to each 1 old share). However, the company also pledged 140 million shares as of 31 December 2015.

== Financial data ==
in a consolidated basis (in CN¥)
Year	Revenue	Profit	Earning per share	Total assets	Net assets	NAV per share
2004	15 million	(16 million)	(0.0244)	1.010 billion	▼649 million	▼0.98
2005 (restated)	▲23 million	▼ (201 million)	▼ (0.302)	▼790 million	▼448 million	▼0.67
2006 (restated)	▲231 million	▲132 million	▲0.198	▲1.461 billion	▲580 million	▲0.87
2007	▲1.052 billion	▲609 million	▲0.452	▲4.933 billion	▲2.025 billion	▲1.35
2008	▼ (387 million)	▼ (645 million)	▼ (0.429)	▼3.493 billion	▼1.380 billion	▼0.92
2009	▲835 million	▲405 million	▲0.270	▲5.959 billion	▲1.785 billion	▲1.19
2010	▼675 million	▼204 million	▼0.136	▼5.856 billion	▲1.959 billion	▲1.30
2011	▼666 million	▼157 million	▼0.104	▼4.940 billion	▲2.116 billion	▲1.41
2012	▼526 million	▼70 million	▼0.043	▼4.480 billion	▲2.135 billion	▼1.29
2013	▼486 million	▲75 million	▲0.045	▲4.630 billion	▲2.183 billion	▲1.32
2014	▲1.359 billion	▲543 million	▲0.171	▲14.190 billion	▲6.402 billion	▲1.81
2015	▲2.743 billion	▲1.133 billion	▲0.321	▲34.092 billion	▲7.402 billion	▲2.10
2016						

- Note, share capital and number of shares had changed in 2007, 2012 and 2014
