= China Foreign Economy and Trade Trust =

Chinese asset management company

- Trade name: FOTIC
- Company type: state-owned subsidiary
- Industry: Financial services
- Founded: 1987
- Headquarters: Beijing, China
- Area served: mainland China
- Revenue: ▲CN¥2.474 billion (2015)
- Operating income: ▼CN¥1.513 billion (2015)
- Net income: ▼CN¥1.204 billion (2015)
- Total assets: ▲CN¥7.591 billion (2015)
- Total equity: ▲CN¥7.434 billion (2015)
- Owner: Chinese Central Government (100%); (via Sinochem Group)
Parent
Sinochem Corporation	(direct)
Sinochem Group	(intermediate)
SASAC	(intermediate)
The State Council	(ultimate)
- Website: fotic.com.cn
- Footnotes / references source

China Foreign Economy and Trade Trust Co., Ltd.
- Simplified Chinese: 中国对外经济贸易信托有限公司
- Traditional Chinese: 中國對外經濟貿易信託有限公司
Transcriptions

China Foreign Economy and Trade Trust Co., Ltd. known as FOTIC is a Chinese asset management company (as trust company). The company is a wholly owned subsidiary of Sinochem Group (via Sinochem Corporation for 93.07% and another subsidiary for 6.93%).

== History ==
FOTIC was incorporated on 30 September 1987 (as Chinese: 中国对外经济贸易信托投资; lit. 'China Foreign Economy and Trade Trust Investment Corporation'). Since 1994, FOTIC was a subsidiary of Sinochem Group (formerly known as China National Chemicals Import & Export Corporation). Some assets and liabilities were transferred to Exim Bank of China that year.

== Equity investments ==
In 2004 the company was one of the investor of the Pacific Securities (a listed company since 2007 as SSE: 601099) for 22.56% stake. In 2007 it was diluted to 10.00%. At the same time, FOTIC also signed a shareholders' agreement with 5 companies, making the consortium acted as the largest shareholder of the Pacific Securities. The agreement expired in March 2010, which FOTIC withdrew from the renewed agreement. In June 2011 to March 12 FOTIC sold 5.02% shares of the Pacific Securities, which the shares were no longer restricted to sell due to 2007 IPO (a 36 months restriction), making FOTIC owned below 5% shares, the threshold to regularly disclose its interests. It was further decreased to 4.58% on 31 March, 2.39% on 30 June to below 2% on 30 September (the 10th largest shareholder owned 2.08% and the shares held by FOTIC was not included in the top 10).

The company also owned 49% stake of Manulife-Sinochem Life Insurance until January 2012. The stake were transferred to another subsidiary (Chinese: 中化集团财务) of Sinochem Group.
