= Lu Jun (engineer) =

Chinese engineer

- 陆军

President of Jiaxing University
- Incumbent
- Assumed office 6 August 2020
- Preceded by: Lu Xinbo

Personal details
- Born: 5 November 1964 (age 61) Suzhou, Jiangsu, China
- Party: Chinese Communist Party
- Education: Southeast University; University of Science and Technology of China
- Scientific career
- Fields: Communication; Electronic system
- Workplaces: Jiaxing University; Shanghai University

Chinese name
- Simplified Chinese: 陆军
- Traditional Chinese: 陸軍
Transcriptions
Standard Mandarin
- Hanyu Pinyin: Lù Jūn

Lu Jun (born 5 November 1964) is a Chinese engineer who is a professor at Shanghai University, an academician of the Chinese Academy of Engineering, and currently president of Jiaxing University.

== Biography ==
Lu was born in Suzhou, Jiangsu, on 5 November 1964. He attended Nanjing Institute of Technology (now Southeast University), graduating in 1985 with a bachelor's degree in underwater acoustic engineering. He went on to receive his master's degree in communication and electronic system from the University of Science and Technology of China in 1988.

After university, he joined the China Electronics Technology Group Corporation, where he worked successively as chief designer of radar system (1991–2001), chief designer of airborne early warning and control (2001–2013), and vice president of Electronic Science Research Institute (2005–2013). In August 2018, he was recruited by Southeast University as dean of the School of Information Science and Engineering. On 6 August 2020, he was appointed president of Jiaxing University, succeeding Lu Xinbo (卢新波). In October, he was hired as dean of Artificial Intelligence Research Institute, Shanghai University.

== Honors and awards ==
- 1999 State Science and Technology Progress Award (Third Class)
- 2008 National Defense Science and Technology Award (Special Prize)
- 2010 Guanghua Engineering Technology Award
- 2010 State Science and Technology Progress Award (Special Prize)
- 27 November 2017 Member of the Chinese Academy of Engineering (CAE)

Educational offices
| Preceded by Lu Xinbo (卢新波) | President of Jiaxing University; 2020–president | Incumbent |
