= Puhua Investment =

- Company type: Joint venture
- Industry: Holding company
- Founded: 2002
- Headquarters: Tai'an, China
- Area served: China
- Revenue: CN¥0 (2014)
- Operating income: (CN¥192 million) (2014)
- Net income: CN¥67 million (2014)
- Total assets: CN¥3.762 billion (2014)
- Total equity: CN¥598 million (2014)
Owner
Potevio	(39.04%)
Taishan Huacheng Tech.	(38.16%)
Weifang Keyu Tech.	(22.80%)
- Website: puhua.cc
- Footnotes / references source

Puhua Investment Co., Ltd.
- Simplified Chinese: 普华投资有限公司
- Traditional Chinese: 普華投資有限公司
Transcriptions
Standard Mandarin
- Hanyu Pinyin: Pǔhuá tóuzī yǒuxiàn gōngsī

Puhua Investment Co., Ltd. is a Chinese company based in Tai'an, Shandong Province. As of 31 December 2015, state-owned enterprise Potevio owned 39.04% stake as the largest shareholder.

== History ==
Puhua Investment was founded in 2002 as Tai'an Taishan Investment Holding (Chinese: 泰安泰山投资控股). (Note: No official English name was known, English translation was for indication only.) (Note: Not to be confused with Taian Taishan Investment (Chinese: 泰安市泰山投资; lit. 'Taian City Taishan Investment')) In 2004 the company was the joint-largest shareholder of the Pacific Securities for 22.56%. In June 2006 it was renamed into Puhua Investment.

== Shareholders ==
As of 31 December 2015, Puhua Investment was majority owned by Potevio (39.04%) and two other companies for 38.16% stake and 22.80% stake respectively. However, Puhua Investment did not appear in the annual report of Potevio as long-term equity investment, while financial assets available for sale was a lump sum figure.

In mid-2015, 20% stake of the company was sold from Taian Fund Investment & Guaranty (Chinese: 泰安市基金投资担保经营) a subsidiary of Taian Taishan Investment, to another existing shareholder (Chinese: 泰安市泰山华城科技开发; lit. 'Taishan Huacheng Technology'), making the shareholder owned 38.16% as the second largest. The price was not disclosed, but the base price in the invitation to bid was CN¥140.14 million.

Taishan Huacheng Technology was 99.67% owned by another company (Chinese: 捷信泰贸易(北京); lit. 'Jiexintai Trading (Beijing)'), but the stake in Taishan Huacheng Technology also pledged to China Fortune International Trust since May 2015. China Fortune Investment Trust had also set up a private equity fund (a trust) to receive the collateral, and the money raised (CN¥1.371 billion) would lend back to Jiexintai.

The third shareholder (Chinese: 潍坊科虞科技; lit. 'Weifang Keyu Technology') was based in Weifang.

== Equity investments ==
Puhua Investment owned 10.00% stake of the Pacific Securities from 2007 to mid-2011. Puhua Investment disinvested the Pacific Securities to 9.57% in 2011, 8.34% in 2012, 3.18% in 2013. Since 2014 Puhua Investment was out of 10 top shareholders of the Pacific Securities (below the 10th for 1.95%); It was ranked as the second largest shareholder in 2012, behind a consortium of six companies for 25.38% shares.

Puhua Investment also owned 5.30% stake of Taian Bank as the 9th largest shareholder (as of 31 December 2015).

Puhua Investment was the 4th largest shareholder of New Times Securities for 8.5646% shares.
