= Industrial University of Tyumen =

University in Tyumen, Russia

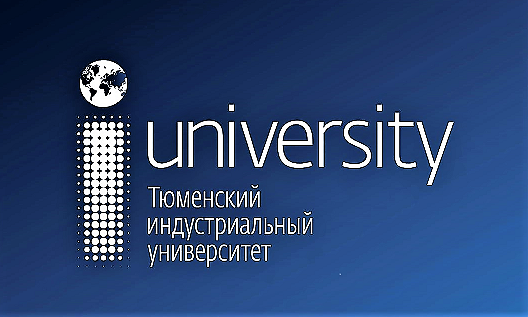
- Type: National University
- Established: 1963; 63 years ago
- Rector: Yuri Klochkov
- Students: 32,530 (1500 international)
- Location: 625000, Volodarskogo 38, Tyumen, Russia; 57.1524°N 65.5445°E
- Website: www.tyuiu.ru

Industrial University of Tyumen (IUT) (before 2016, known as the Tyumen State Oil and Gas University and the Tyumen State University of Architecture and Civil Engineering) is a higher education institution in Tyumen, Russia.

IUT provides education from secondary general, secondary vocational education, and higher education, to doctoral studies and business education programs. Studies are held in 25 large groups of areas of training and specialties and in more than 150 educational programs. The number of students is approximately 32,530 people. The IUT research group includes 225 higher doctorate and professors, and 787 candidates of sciences, associate professors.

The rector of IUT is Yuri Klochkov, as of 10 May 2024.

== History ==
The development of the Tyumen region and the development of the engineering industry required the training of specialists. In 1956, to solve this problem the regional government opened an educational and consulting center of the Ural Polytechnic Institute in the building of the Tyumen Machine-Building Technical School. In 1963, the Industrial Institute of Tyumen was established by the Government decree. The first rector of TII was Anatoly Kosukhin, who previously worked as an associate professor at the Ural Polytechnic Institute. In ten years, the student body grew from 750 in 1964 to 8,955 in 1974.

In 1971, the construction faculty of the Industrial Institute of Tyumen became an independent higher educational institution – the Tyumen institute of civil engineering. In 1973, Viktor Kopylov became the rector of Industrial Institute of Tyumen. In 1986, Valentin Kanalin was appointed as rector. In 1990, Nikolai Karnaukhov was appointed as rector of Industrial Institute of Tyumen.

In 1994, IIT changed its name to Tyumen State Oil and Gas University. In the year of the institution's 50th anniversary, about 50 thousand people studied at the university in 650 general education programs. Over this time, the University has graduated about 75 thousand specialists.

In 2003, the University introduced a quality management system (QMS) for compliance with international educational standards. On 31 March 2010, at the Conference of scientific and pedagogical workers and students of the university, Vladimir Novoselov was elected as a new rector of the University. The faculty consisted of 1100 candidates and doctors of sciences, with three full members and two corresponding members of the RAS.

On 25 March 2016, by the decree of the Ministry of Education and Science of the Russian Federation, Tyumen State Oil and Gas University was renamed into Industrial University of Tyumen. In May 2017 Veronika Efremova, a candidate of economic sciences, associate professor, was appointed as acting rector, a position she formally accepted as a permanent role in September 2019. In 2018, the University launched the educational project "Higher School of Engineering EG", which trains new-breed engineers in the area of digital transformation of the region.

Today 35,000 students study at the University at all levels of education. IUT offers 36 areas of training in higher education programs (bachelor's, specialist's degree), 31 Master's programs, 37 intermediate vocational education programs, 14 training programs for blue-collar professions and 8 areas of study in postgraduate programs. In total, the university has trained over 230 thousand specialists.

=== Rectors ===
- 1964–1973 – Anatoly Kosukhin
- 1973–1986 – Viktor Kopylov
- 1986–1990 – Valentin Kanalin
- 1990–2010 – Nikolai Karnaukhov
- 2010–2015 – Vladimir Novoselov
- 2015–2017 – Oleg Novoselov
- 2017–2024 – Veronika Efremova
- 2024–present – Yuri Klochkov

== Extracurricular activities ==
The university has a joint student council (OSSO).

The United Primary Trade union Organization (OPPO) is a voluntary public association of citizens bound by common interests by the nature of their activities, created for their representation and protection of social and labor rights.

The university has clubs and organizations of interest:

- Tyumen branch of the Unternational student society of petroleum engineers at IUT (SPE);

== International activity ==
Since 1978, the University has been training specialists for foreign countries (mainly Mongolia and Bulgaria). Teachers of the University took part in training the engineering personnel for Algeria.

Since the 2000s, there has been an active internationalization of the university's activities. During this time, the geography of international partners has expanded significantly: today Industrial University of Tyumen has more than 50 cooperation agreements with universities in China, Vietnam, Germany, Slovenia, Finland, Great Britain, Latvia, Czech Republic, Austria, Indonesia, Philippines, India, Bulgaria, Kazakhstan, Armenia and others. IUT's partners are large international companies such as Schlumberger, Baker Hughes, Halliburton, CCA Deutag Drilling, Bentec, Weatherford, The Cuba Oil Union (CUPET) and others.

To teach foreign citizens the Russian language, the IUT implements an additional general education program "Pre-university courses for foreign students".

Since 2017, Industrial University of Tyumen has been teaching master's programs in English:

• Offshore drilling

• Geosteering

• Logistics and supply chain management

• Advertising media business

The university is a member of the University of the Arctic. UArctic is an international cooperative network based in the Circumpolar Arctic region, consisting of more than 200 universities, colleges, and other organizations with an interest in promoting education and research in the Arctic region. The collaboration has been paused after the beginning of the Russo-Ukrainian War in 2022.

== Ratings ==
- Ranked 71st among the best universities in Russia (2020) according to research by the Expert RA rating agency
- National University Ranking Interfax – 78 position (2020)
- In the first ranking of the best universities in Russia, according to Forbes, it is ranked 57th (2020)
- In the top 100 Best universities in Russia in the field of Technical, natural sciences and exact sciences – 39 position (2020)
- In the International professional ranking of universities RankPro 2019–2020, the IUT is included in the group of 700+ universities
- Included in the ranking of universities in developing countries in Europe and Central Asia QS University rankings: Emerging Europe & Central Asia, ranked 301–350 (2020)
- In 2019 was included in the QS University rankings: BRICS, group 351–400
- In the Moscow international ranking of universities "Three missions of the university" (2020) ranked in the group 1101–1200

== Organization structure ==
=== Institutes ===
- Institute of industrial technologies and engineering
- Institute of architecture and design
- Institute of transport
- Institute of service and industry management
- Institute of oil and gas
- Institute of extended and distance education

=== Branches ===
- IUT branch in Nizhnevartovsk
- Noyabrsk Institute of Oil and Gas
- Surgut Institute of Oil and Gas
- Tobolsk Industrial Institute

=== Colleges ===
- IUT Multidisciplinary College

=== Lyceums ===
- IUT Lyceum

== Literature ==
- The university is strong by its graduates: dedicated to the 35th anniversary of TSOGU (IIT). Tyumen, 1998, p. 164
- University, oil and people: the 30th anniversary of the Tyumen Industrial Institute. Tyumen, 1993, p. 239
- Ivantsova G.I. Construction projects of a complex of buildings IIT – TSOGU // Revival of the historical center of Tyumen. Tyumen in the past, present and future. Abstracts and messages of the scientific-practical conference. Tyumen, 2002, p. 32–35.
- Kovensky I.M., Kopylov V.E., Skifsky S.V. To the history of relations between the Tyumen State Oil and Gas University (Industrial institute) and the institutes of the SB RAS // Science of Tyumen at the turn of the century. Tyumen, 1999, p. 182–188.
- Kopylov V.E. The first rector of the "Industrial' // Kopylov V.E. The call of memory (History of the Tyumen region through the eyes of an engineer). Book two. Tyumen, 2001, p. 198-204.
- Chronicle of the Tyumen State Oil and Gas University: Vol. 1–5. Tyumen, 1998–2002.
- The "Neftegaz" deposit: encyclopedia of graduates of TSOGU. Tyumen, 2003, p. 488.
- From Institute to University: dedicated to the 35th anniversary of the Tyumen State Oil and Gas University. Tyumen, 1998, p. 197
