= Baotou Tomorrow Technology =

Chinese company based in Inner Mongolia

- Formerly: Baotou Yellow River Chemical Industry
- Company type: public
- Traded as: SSE: 600091
- Founded: 1997
- Founder: Baotou Chemical Industry Group
- Headquarters: Baotou, China
- Key people: Li Guochun (Chairman & President); Li Jingbo (Vice-Chairman & Party Committee Secretary)
- Revenue: ▲CN¥22.0 million (2015)
- Operating income: ▲CN¥28.8 million (2015)
- Net income: ▲CN¥33.8 million (2015)
- Total assets: ▲CN¥1.265 billion (2015)
- Total equity: ▲CN¥874.3 million (2015)
Owner
Zhengyuan Investment	(34.60%)
Baotou Beida Tomorrow	(3.43%)
Zhejiang Hengji Industry	(3.26%)
others	(58.71%)
- Website: tomotech.com
- Footnotes / references in a consolidated basis

Baotou Tomorrow Technology Co., Ltd. known also as Tomorrow Technology or BTTT is a Chinese listed company based in Baotou, Inner Mongolia. Tomorrow Technology is an associate company of Tomorrow Holding, a company related to Xiao Jianhua.

== History ==
Baotou Yellow River Chemical Industry Co., Ltd. (Chinese: 包头黄河化工股份有限公司) was incorporated on 26 June 1997 as a subsidiary of state-owned enterprise Baotou Chemical Industry Group Corporation (Chinese: 包头化工集团总公司). The company became a listed company in the same year, with the parent company still owned 57.53% shares as of 31 December 1999.

In 1999 "Beijing Beida Tomorrow Resources Technology" (Chinese: 北京北大明天资源科技) acquired 47% stake of Baotou Chemical Industry Group Corporation for CN¥108.6264 million and renamed to "Baotou Beida Tomorrow Resources Technology" (Chinese: 包头北大明天资源科技). Due to the change of ownership of the holding company, Yellow River Chemical Industry also renamed to Baotou Tomorrow Technology Co., Ltd. on 3 September 1999. On 15 April that year Xiao Jianhua also became the new director and chairman of the listed company. Xiao Jianhua step down as the chairman on 27 December 2000 and resigned as a director on 10 April 2001. Baotou Beida Tomorrow Resources Technology also sold 16.64% stake of Tomorrow Technology to Baotou Beipu Industry (Chinese: 包头市北普实业) for CN¥290.08 million (CN¥5.18 each) in 2002. Tomorrow Technology acquired 80% stake of a subsidiary of Baotou Beipu Industry for CN¥30 million on 6 April 1999. Baotou Beida Tomorrow Resources Technology owned 22.09% shares of Tomorrow Technology at the end of year 2002. According to a publication of Tsinghua University Press, Baotou Beipu Industry was in fact 100% owned by Beijing Beida Tomorrow Resources Technology at that time. Yellow River Chemical Industry also sold a subsidiary to Beijing Beida Tomorrow Resources Technology CN¥20.94 million on 23 December 1998.

In 2002 Tomorrow Technology acquired 34% minority stake of Shandong Taishan Energy (Chinese: 山东泰山能源) for CN¥252.1 million from Xinwen Mining Group.

During 2004 Baotou Beida Tomorrow Resources Technology sold a further 10.06% shares of Tomorrow Technology to Zhejiang Hengji Industry (Chinese: 浙江恒际实业) for CN¥214.55 million (CN¥6.34 per share); Baotou Beida Tomorrow Resources Technology retained 12.03% stake as the second largest shareholder. It also made Baotou Beipu Industry became the largest shareholder for 16.64% shares. It also revealed that Beijing Beida Tomorrow Resources Technology (changed the name to Chinese: 北京科宇恒信科技; lit. 'Beijing Keyu Hengxin Technology') was changed to own by Yang Hongmei (Chinese: 杨红梅) for 79%, in turn Beijing Keyu Hengxin owned Baotou Beipu Industry for 85% stake at that time.

On 25 December 2006 90% stake of a subsidiary (Chinese: 包头市广通能源) was sold for CN¥182.55 million.

In January 2007 Tomorrow Holding (a company 17% owned by Xiao Weihua, cousin of Xiao Jianhua), acquired 95% stake of Baotou Beipu Industry (10% from Dalian Tongyi Xinda Technology (Chinese: 大连通易新达科技)), making Tomorrow Holding the indirect major shareholder of Tomorrow Technology for 10.32% shares.

On 28 September 2007 87.31% stake of a subsidiary (Chinese: 北京明天浩海科技发展) was sold for CN¥144.5 million.

In March 2008, Tomorrow Technology acquired 49.4% stake of Inner Mongolia Ronglian Investment Development (Chinese: 内蒙古荣联投资发展) for CN¥400 million. The rest of the stake was acquired by Taishan Energy, at that time a subsidiary of Shanghai Ace Co., Ltd.'s (SSE: 600652), but Tomorrow Technology also owned 34% stake. In 2010, Tomorrow Technology contributed CN¥41.002 million to Ronglian Investment as capital increase.

In June 2008, 96% stake of a subsidiary: Shanghai Tomorrow Beipu Technology Development (Chinese: 上海明天北普科技发展) was sold from Tomorrow Technology for CN¥58.54 million.

In September–October 2008 Zhengyuan Investment acquired most of the shares of Tomorrow Technology held by Zhejiang Hengji Industry and Tomorrow Holding (via Baotou Beipu Industry). As of 31 December 2008, Zhengyuan Investment owned 15% shares, followed by Baotou Beida Tomorrow Resources Technology for 7.46% and Zhejiang Hengji Industry for 1.24%; Baotou Beipu Industry owned just 0.32% as the 7th largest shareholder.

In 2010 Tomorrow Technology sold 1.08% shares of Baoshang Bank for an approx. CN¥104.07 million (CN¥3.82 per share). In the same year, the entire share capital of a subsidiary: Lijiang Derun Property Development (Chinese: 丽江德润房地产开发) was sold for CN¥380 million.

In June 2012, the major shareholder of Zhengyuan Investment had changed to Tomorrow Holding (36%), making Tomorrow Holding became the indirect major shareholder of Tomorrow Technology again.

In July 2012 17.6% stake of Inner Mongolia Ronglian was sold to Shanghai Ace for CN¥274.8 million.

In 2016 Tomorrow Technology planned to sell their minority stake (34%) on Taishan Energy to Tiāntiān kējì (Chinese: 天天科技; lit. 'Everyday Technology'), the largest shareholder of U9 Game (formerly known as Shanghai Ace) and an associate company of Tomorrow Holding.

== Shareholders ==
=== Zhengyuan Investment ===
As of 30 June 2016, the largest shareholder of Tomorrow Technology was Zhèngyuán Tóuzī (Chinese: 正元投资; lit. 'Zhengyuan Investment') for 34.60%; Zhengyuan Investment itself was majority owned by Tomorrow Holding for 36%; Tomorrow Holding itself was chaired and majority owned (29%) by Xiao Weihua, cousin of Xiao Jianhua. It was reported that Baotou Beipu Industry, a subsidiary (95%) of Tomorrow Holding, still owned 0.25% stake of Tomorrow Technology, making the consortium of Tomorrow Holding owned 34.85% stake of the public company since 2015. Xiao Weihua owned 5% stake of Baotou Beipu Industry personally. Zhengyuan Investment subscribed the capital increase of the listed company, making the shares they held was increased from 15% to 34.60%.

Zhengyuan Investment was majority (30%) owned by an indirect subsidiary (90% times 99.99% stake) of Beijing Beida Jade Bird (Chinese: 北京北大青鸟) from 2008 until 2012. Beijing Beida Jade Bird itself was an indirect subsidiary of Peking University: Beijing Beida Jade Bird was 46% owned by Jade Bird Software, in turn Jade Bird Software was 48% owned by Peking University. Thus, if excluding minority interests, Peking University only owned about 5.96% indirectly on Tomorrow Technology. The ownership also made Beida Jade Bird Universal Sci-Tech (SEHK: 8095) becoming the sister company of Tomorrow Technology, as they both controlled by Jade Bird Software, as well as making Cinda Real Estate (SSE: 600657) as related parties, as Zhengyuan Investment owned 6.56% shares as the third largest shareholder. Before Zhengyuan Investment acquired the shares of Tomorrow Technology, Xishui Strong Year (SSE: 600291) already a related parties of Tomorrow Technology, as Tomorrow Holding were the largest shareholders of both companies. In 2008 Zhengyuan Investment also acquired the shares of Xishui Strong Year (14.608%) from Tomorrow Holding.

In June 2012 Tomorrow Holding acquired 36% stake of Zhengyuan from minority shareholders (Chinese: 捷信泰贸易(北京) for 26% and Chinese: 济南盛讯商贸 for 10%) for CN¥482.4 million, making Tomorrow Holding became the largest shareholder of Zhengyuan Investment for 36%. In turn, the acquisition made Tomorrow Holding the indirect major shareholder of Tomorrow Technology for 15%.

Circa 2012 or 2013, Beijing Beida Jade Bird sold all their 30% stake on Zhengyuan Investment to parties other than Tomorrow Holding. Compared to 2008 disclosure, as of 31 December 2013, another shareholder of Zhengyuan Investment: Chongqing Kaitai Business Consulting (Chinese: 重庆开泰商务咨询) had increased its stake from 8% to 31%; three investors withdrew (Beijing Beida Jade Bird, Chinese: 北京明德广业投资咨询 and Chinese: 融泰天成(北京)科技 for a combined 62% stake) and the introduction of two new investors (Tomorrow Technology (36%) and Chinese: 深圳泰富邦宁贸易 (33%)).

=== Baotou Beida Tomorrow Resources Technology ===
The second largest shareholder of Tomorrow Technology was Baotou Beida Tomorrow Resources Technology for 3.43% stake, the parent company of Tomorrow Technology from 1997 to 1999. As of 31 December 2015, State-owned Assets Supervision and Administration Commission of Baotou Municipal People's Government owned 53% stake in Baotou Beida Tomorrow Resources Technology, with the rest owned by the company formerly known as Beijing Beida Tomorrow Resources Technology (now known as "Beijing Keyu Hengxin Technology"), a private company owned by Zhang Haixia (Chinese: 张海霞) and Zhou Wuyun (Chinese: 周五云).

The chairman of Baotou Beida Tomorrow Resources Technology was Li Jingbo, which was also nominated as the vice-chairman of Baotou Tomorrow Technology.
