= China Fortune Trust =

Chinese investment management company

China Fortune International Trust
- Company type: subsidiary
- Industry: Financial services
- Predecessor: Foshan International Trust Investment
- Founded: 24 December 2008
- Founder: Huadian
- Revenue: ▲CN¥946 million (2014)
- Operating income: ▲CN¥706 million (2014)
- Net income: ▲CN¥523 million (2014)
- AUM: ▲CN¥160.815 billion (2014)
- Total assets: ▼CN¥3.289 billion (2014)
- Total equity: ▲CN¥3.131 billion (2014)
- Owner: Chinese Central Government; (via Huadian (100%))
Parent
Huadian	(direct)
SASAC	(intermediate)
State Council	(ultimate)
- Website: cfitc.com
- Footnotes / references source

China Fortune International Trust
- Simplified Chinese: 华鑫国际信托
- Traditional Chinese: 華鑫國際信託
Transcriptions

China Fortune Trust
- Simplified Chinese: 华鑫信托
- Traditional Chinese: 華鑫信託
Transcriptions

China Fortune International Trust Co., Ltd. known as China Fortune Trust is a Chinese investment management company which license to create private equity fund (as trust). The company is a wholly owned subsidiary of state-owned China Huadian Corporation.

== History ==
China Fortune International Trust Co., Ltd. was re-registered on 24 December 2008, after Huadian acquired the license from dormant company Foshan International Trust Investment Co., Ltd.. The company was also relocated from Foshan to Beijing.

== Private equity funds ==
- Xinbao N°47 Trust: 99.67% stake of Taishan Huacheng Technology (a shareholder of Puhua Investment and Taian Bank) as pledge, CN¥1.371 billion borrowed to Jiexintai.
