= Xiao Jianhua =

Chinese-Canadian businessman

- Born: January 13, 1972 (age 54); Feicheng, Shandong, China
- Education: Peking University
- Occupation: Businessman
- Political party: Chinese Communist Party

Xiao Jianhua
- Simplified Chinese: 肖建华
- Traditional Chinese: 肖建華
Transcriptions
Standard Mandarin
- Hanyu Pinyin: Xiāo Jiànhuá

Xiao Jianhua (Chinese: 肖建华, born 13 January 1972) is a Chinese-Canadian businessman and billionaire known for managing assets for the descendants of prominent Chinese leaders. He was taken from Hong Kong to mainland China in 2017. Canadian diplomats were denied access to his trial by a Shanghai court, which sentenced him to 13 years in jail and fined his company more than $8 billion for embezzlement and bribery.

== Early life ==
Xiao was born in 1972 to a schoolteacher from Feicheng, Shandong, China.

Xiao attended Peking University at age 14 on a scholarship, and he was a member of the Chinese Communist Party on campus. He was opposed to the Tiananmen Square protests of 1989. He received a law degree from Peking University.

== Career ==
Xiao began his career in business by selling IBM and Dell computers near the Peking University campus in the 1990s. He also worked with Microsoft. Within a few years, he was worth an estimated $150 million.

Xiao is the owner of Tomorrow Holding (trading as Tomorrow Group), a diversified investment company involved with banking, insurance, real estate development, coal, cement and rare earth minerals. According to The New York Times, he owns non-controlling stakes in Ping An Insurance, Harbin Bank, Huaxia Bank and the Industrial Bank through a series of other investment vehicles, in addition to being the major shareholder in Baotou Tomorrow Technology.

Xiao reportedly, "worked on behalf of a number of powerful families," in China over the course of his career, and he has been described by The New York Times as "a banker for the ruling class." By 2016, he was worth an estimated $6 billion. Xiao's connections with relatives of China's government leaders were demonstrated by his purchase of a 50% stake in CCB International Yuanwei Fund Management, an investment management company owned by Qi Qiaoqiao, Xi Jinping's sister. According to news reports, Xiao was also involved with the business Pacific Securities, a company later accused of facilitating money laundering.

=== Beijing Beida Tomorrow Resources Technology ===
Xiao's business empire started with "Beijing Beida Tomorrow Resources Technology" (Chinese: 北京北大明天资源科技), a company that was 20% owned by Peking University Resources Group. In 1999, the company acquired a 47% stake in an intermediate parent company of Baotou Tomorrow Technology (formerly known as Baotou Yellow River Chemical Industry) from Baotou Municipal Government. Beijing Beida Tomorrow Resources Technology also held the right to nominate three out of the company's five directors, as well as the chairman of the board and general manager of the intermediate parent company. The intermediate parent company was renamed Baotou Beida Tomorrow Resources Technology. In 1999, Xiao Jianhua was nominated as the chairman of Baotou Tomorrow Technology, while Zhou Hongwen, his wife, was the president of Beijing Beida Tomorrow Resources Technology.

=== Tomorrow Holding ===
According to a 2015 annual report published by Baotou Tomorrow Technology, Tomorrow Holding is currently owned by Xiao's cousin, Xiao Weihua, who has a 29% stake in the company. It has been reported that Xiao Jianhua owns his assets through relatives or his wife, but not directly himself. According to one publication, Tomorrow Holding was originally owned by Xiao and his wife, who together had a 50% stake.

In 2000, Tomorrow Holding and its associate companies owned shares of 5.75% in Shanghai Ace (SSE: 600652). However, Xiao Jianhua and his wife, Zhou Hongwen, as well as four other people associated with Tomorrow Holding, were elected as Shanghai Ace's new directors, though only seven new directors were elected that year, and the board consisted of only 13 directors total. The only new director with no apparent connection to Tomorrow Holding was the new chairman of Shanghai Ace, Deng Jingshun, who later became vice-president of Tomorrow Holding. The move made Tomorrow Holding having an absolute majority in the board of the listed company.

In 2008, Tomorrow Holding sold their stake in Baotou Tomorrow Technology to Zhengyuan Investment (Chinese: 正元投资; lit. 'Zhèngyuán tóuzī'), at that time majority owned by Beijing Beida Jade Bird for 30% (an associate company of Peking University) and other companies.

However, in 2012, Tomorrow Holding bought back a 36% stake in Zhengyuan Investment from shareholders other than Beijing Beida Jade Bird. In turn, Zhengyuan Investment owned a 34.60% stake in Baotou Tomorrow Technology and a 95% stake in Baotou Beipu Industry (Chinese: 包头市北普实业), of which 5% Beipu Industry is owned by Xiao Weihua. Baotou Beipu Industry owns an additional 0.25% stake in Baotou Tomorrow Technology.

Chinese regulators have since taken control of many Tomorrow Holding companies including Huaxia Life, Tianan Life Insurance, Tianan Property Insurance, New Times Trust, Yi'An Property Insurance, and New China Trust, the China Banking and Insurance Regulatory Commission.

== Criminal case ==
According to a report published in 2017, orders for Xiao's detention had been given in 2013, but contacts within the Chinese government had informed him first and he had fled to Hong Kong. He resided at the Four Seasons Hotel there.

On January 28, 2017, Xiao was taken from his apartment at the hotel reportedly by Chinese public security officers. Five or six plain-clothed agents accosted Xiao and, after a meeting inside his room, led him and his two bodyguards away through one of Hong Kong's border crossings. According to sources, Xiao was whisked away in a wheelchair with his head covered, there were no signs of scuffles outside his room and he appeared to have gone willingly after the meeting. The Hong Kong police declined to comment except to say that it had asked for mainland police's help in the case.

In September 2018, a report from the South China Morning Post citing unnamed sources stated that Xiao would soon be brought to trial over the crimes of "manipulating stock and futures markets" and "offering bribes on behalf of institutions".

On August 19, 2022, Xiao was sentenced in China to 13 years in prison for fraud and corruption.

== Philanthropy ==
Xiao donated $50 million to his alma mater, Peking University, and Tsinghua University. He also pledged a $10 million donation to Harvard University.

== Personal life ==
Xiao is married to Zhou Hongwen (Chinese: 周虹文), who is from Baotou, Inner Mongolia. He purchased a property in Canada and acquired Canadian citizenship. He also has a diplomatic passport from Antigua and Barbuda, which he acquired several days before his abduction. He also owns properties in the United States, and a private jet.

== See also ==
- List of kidnappings
- Extraordinary rendition
