= Emerald Energy =

Chinese energy exploration company

Emerald Energy plc
- Company type: Wholly owned subsidiary
- Industry: Oil and Natural Gas
- Founded: 1996
- Headquarters: London, United Kingdom
- Revenue: $86.0 million (2008)
- Operating income: $53.1 million (2008)
- Net income: $35.6 million (2008)
- Owner: Sinochem Group
- Number of employees: 130 (2013)
- Website: emeraldenergy.com

Emerald Energy plc is an energy exploration subsidiary of Chinese state-owned company Sinochem with headquarters in London but is registered offshore in the Isle of Man. The company specialises in oil exploration and production of hydrocarbons. Formerly listed on the London Stock Exchange and a constituent of the FTSE 250 Index, the firm was acquired by Sinochem Group in October 2009.

== History ==
The company was established in 1996 when it was first listed on the London Stock Exchange as an oil exploration business. Later in 1996 it secured its first major opportunity at the Matambo field in Colombia. By 1998 it had started drilling at Gigante in the Matambo field.

In May 2000 a serious fire at Gigante put a well out of production for several months.

The company extended its activities to Campo Rico in Colombia in 2002 and to Fortuna in Colombia in 2003. In 2003 it also started activities in Syria, its first move outside Colombia, and replaced the Board and senior management.

=== Buyout ===
On 13 July 2009 the company announced that it was in preliminary takeover talks with a third party. On 12 August Sinochem Resources UK Limited, an indirect wholly owned subsidiary of Sinochem Corporation, announced their recommended proposals for the all-cash acquisition of Emerald Energy Plc. It is proposed that 750 pence will be paid in cash for each share, valuing Emerald Energy at approximately £532.1 million.

On 2 October Emerald Energy announced the results of an EGM, where a clear majority of 99% of shareholders voted to approve the sale's scheme of arrangement. The last day of dealings in, and for registration of transfers of the company's shares was 6 October 2009. The shares were removed from the LSE on 12 October, and the company became a subsidiary of Sinochem the next day.

== Operations ==
Emerald Energy have many contracts which cover exploration and exploitation rights of oil fields in Colombia and Syria. Since the takeover by Sinochem details of operations have been removed from the official website. Below are details of some operations from before the Sinochem buyout.

In March 2023 there were violent protests at its facilities near San Vicente del Caguan in Colombia.

=== Colombia ===
- Matambo Association Contract, Gigante field
  - At 69 km^{2} it covers the Gigante field and surrounding areas in the Upper Magdalena Valley.
- Campo Rico Association Contract, Campo Rico & Vigia Fields
  - At 503 km^{2} it covers the Llanos basin area.
- Fortuna Association Contract
  - At 106 km^{2} it covers the oil-producing Middle Magdalena Valley basin and includes the Totumal oil field. Emerald have a 90% working interest in the area.
- Maranta E&P Contract
  - At 365 km^{2} it covers the area northeast of the producing oil fields in the Putumayo Basin (southwest Colombia).
- Ombu E&P Contract
  - At 300 km^{2} it covers the Caguan Basin, to the south-west of the Llanos Basin.
- Helen E&P Contract
  - At 213 km^{2} it covers the Putumayo Basin in south-west Colombia. Emerald are a co-venturer to jointly explore the area.
- Jacaranda E&P Contract
  - At 235 km^{2} it covers the Llanos Basin, 130 km southwest of the Campo Rico operations.

=== Syria ===
- Block 26
  - Through Emerald Energy's wholly owned subsidiary, SNG Overseas Ltd, they have a 50% working interest in Block 26, the other 50% is held by Gulfsands Petroleum Syria Ltd. It is located in northeast Syria and covers around 11,000 km^{2}.
