= China Electronics Technology Group Corporation =

Chinese state-owned electronics company

- Company type: State-owned enterprise
- Industry: Defence, Electronics, Telecommunications, IT
- Founded: March 1, 2002; 24 years ago
- Headquarters: Haidian District, Beijing, China
- Area served: Worldwide
- Key people: Xiong Qunli (Chairman and President)
- Products: Radars, Unmanned aerial vehicles, Electronic equipment, Telecommunications equipments, Software, Internetworking
- Revenue: 220,427,000,000 renminbi (2018)
- Operating income: ▲CN¥ 188 billion (2016)
- Net income: ▲CN¥ 18.31 billion (2016)
- Total assets: $51,672 million
- Owner: Central People's Government (100%)
- Number of employees: 150,000
- Subsidiaries: CET HIK Group (100%)
- Website: www.cetc.com.cn

China Electronics Technology Group Corporation
- Simplified Chinese: 中国电子科技集团公司
- Traditional Chinese: 中國電子科技集團公司
Transcriptions
Standard Mandarin
- Hanyu Pinyin: Zhōngguó Diànzǐ KējÌ Jítuán Gōngsī

CETC
- Simplified Chinese: 中国电科
- Traditional Chinese: 中國電科
- Literal meaning: China Electronics Technology
Transcriptions
Standard Mandarin
- Hanyu Pinyin: Zhōngguó Diàn Kē

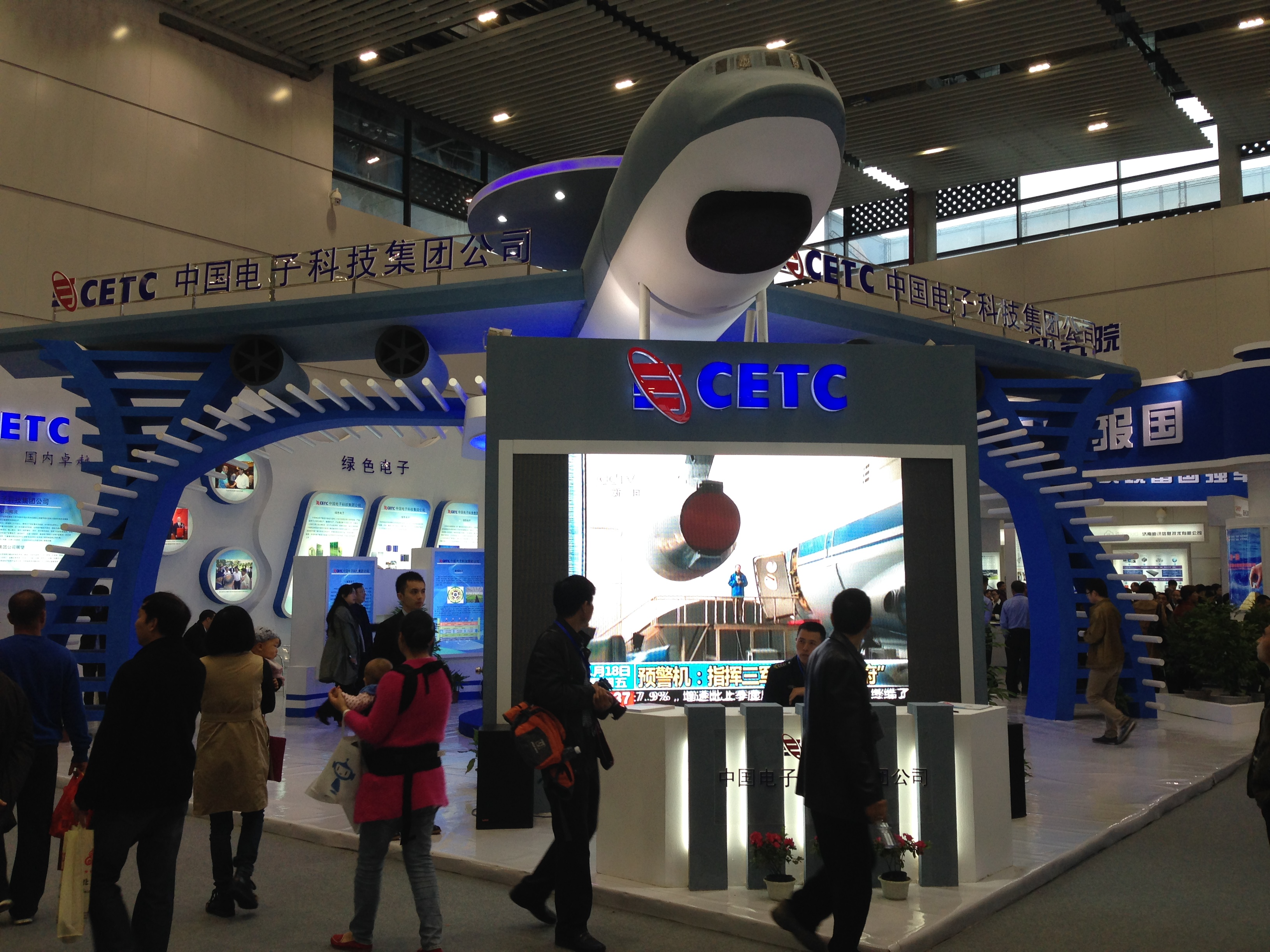
CETC in The 2nd China (Mianyang) Science & Technology City International Hi-Tech Expo. Mianyang, 2014.

China Electronics Technology Group Corporation (CETC; Chinese: 中国电子科技集团公司) is a Chinese state-owned company established in 2002. Its fields include communications equipment, computers, electronic equipment, IT infrastructure, networks, software development, research services, investment and asset management for civilian and military applications. It was founded with the stated goal of leveraging civilian electronics for the benefit of the People's Liberation Army.

In 2021, CETC became the third largest electronics and IT company in China after absorbing Potevio, with a combined revenue of $53 billion in 2019, behind only Huawei and Lenovo.

The company also handles electronic parts and systems for radars, missiles, key components for satellites in the BeiDou network, semiconductors, antennas for wireless infrastructure as well as equipment for autonomous-driving technology.

== History ==
China Electronics Technology Group Corporation was founded in March 2002 by the Minister of Information Industry. The company is located in Beijing, Shanghai, Tianjin, Guangdong, Sichuan, Shaanxi and 18 other provinces. CETC has been the intended recipient of several prosecuted acts of industrial espionage in the U.S.

In 2012, CETC celebrated their tenth anniversary and had 80,000 employees at the time.

In March 2016, the government tasked the company with developing software to identify potential terrorists; using data on jobs, hobbies, consumption habits, and other behaviors.

From 2016 to 2019, CETC built radar platforms for the People's Liberation Army in the northern part of the South China Sea between the Paracel Islands and Hainan.

In June 2017, CETC successfully launched the world's largest fixed-wing drone swarm to date. The drones in the swarm were a commercial fixed-wing model produced by Skywalker Technology, a Wuhan-based company.

In December 2017, CETC was reported to be soliciting government contracts to deploy facial recognition systems in Hotan Prefecture.

In September 2020, a CETC subsidiary named Zhenhua Data was implicated in a leak of intelligence gathering information on individuals worldwide.

In 2021, it was reported that Potevio had been absorbed into China Electronics Technology Group (CETC).

CETC partners with Siemens and is the most important shareholder of Hikvision.

=== U.S. sanctions ===
In August 2020, the Bureau of Industry and Security placed four CETC subsidiaries on its Entity List for their work to militarize artificial islands in the South China Sea. In November 2020, Donald Trump issued an executive order prohibiting any American company or individual from owning shares in companies that the United States Department of Defense has listed as having links to the People's Liberation Army, which included CETC. In August 2022, CETC's 43 and 58 Research Institutes were added to the United States Department of Commerce's Entity List. In December 2022, CETC's 28 Research Institute and other CETC subsidiaries were added to the Entity List.

Following the 2023 Chinese balloon incident, the U.S. Commerce Department added CETC's 48 Research Institute to the Entity List for supporting "China's military modernization efforts, specifically the People's Liberation Army's (PLA) aerospace programs including airships and balloons." In May 2024, the U.S. Commerce Department added further units of CETC to the Entity List.

== Subsidiaries ==
- CET HIK Group (100%)
  - Hikvision (41.87%)

== See also ==
- Semiconductor industry in China
