= Sinochem =

Chinese chemical and fertilizer conglomerate

Sinochem Group

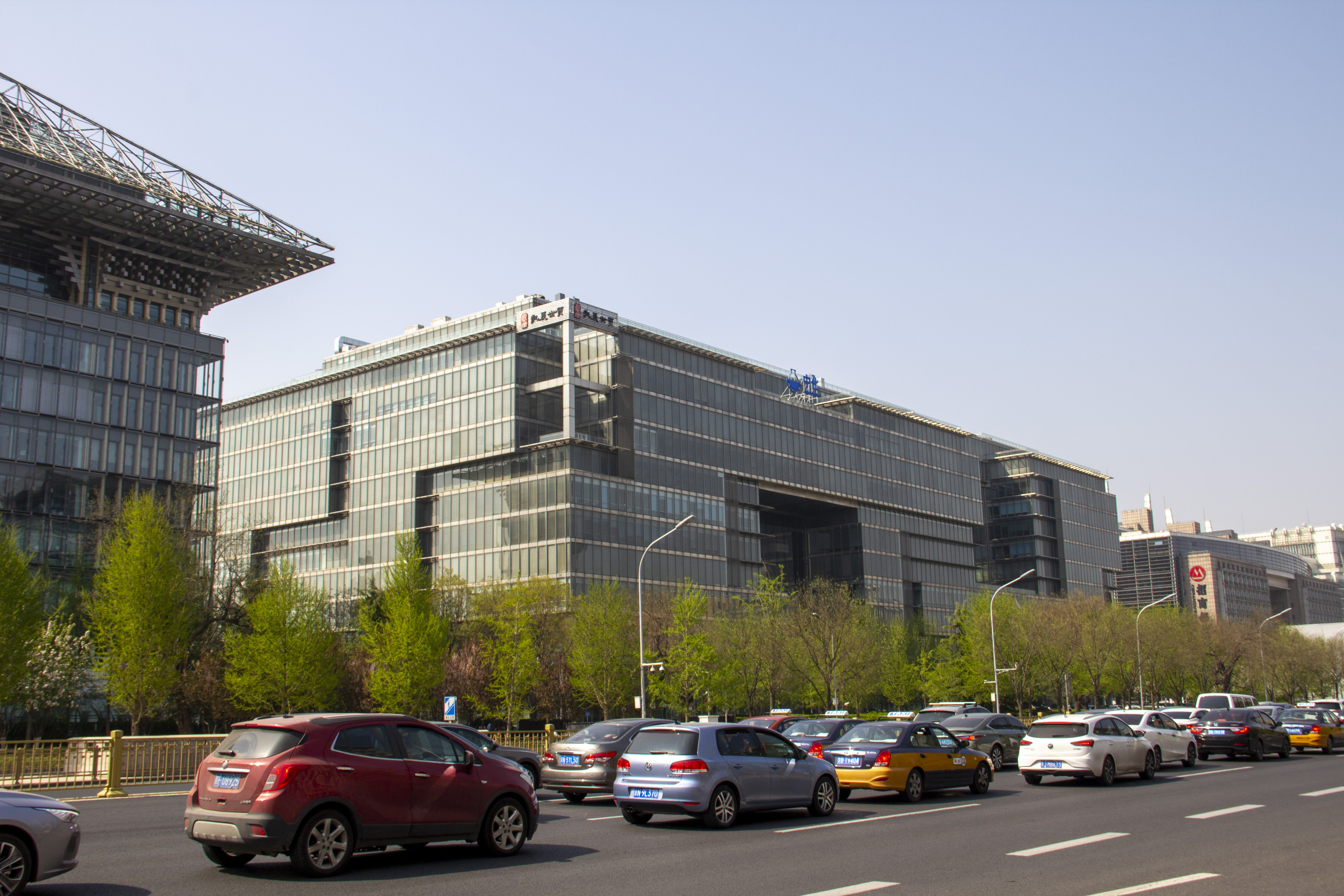
- Headquarters in Beijing
- Type: State owned
- Founded: 1950; 76 years ago
- Headquarters: Xiong'an, Hebei, China
- Key people: Li Fanrong (chairman)
- Products: Petrochemical, petroleum, fertilizer
- Revenue: ▼US$ 143.2 billion (2023)
- Net income: ▼US$ -3.666 billion (2023)
- Total assets: US$ 223.9 billion (2023)
- Number of employees: 382,894 (2023)
- Parent: Sinochem Holdings
- Subsidiaries: Syngenta
- Website: www.sinochem.com

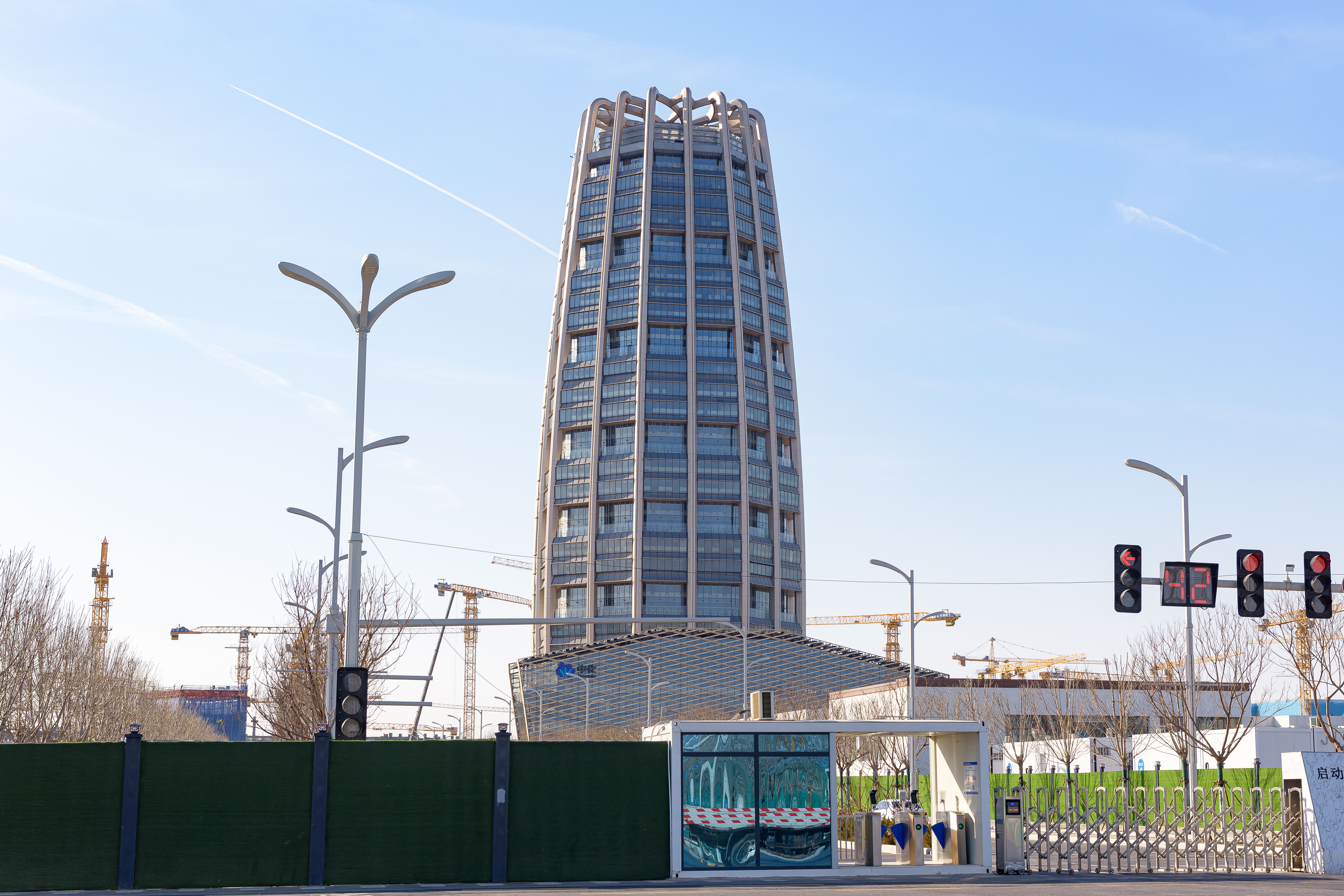
New headquarters of Sinochem in Xiong'an, Hebei, before completion in February 2025

Sinochem Corporation (Chinese: 中国中化集团公司) is a Chinese state-owned multinational conglomerate primarily engaged in the production and trading of chemicals and fertilizer and exploration and production of oil for civilian and military purposes. Its majority owned fertilizer subsidiary Sinofert is involved throughout the chain from production of the product and procurement on international markets to distribution and retail. It is one of the world's largest chemical and petroleum companies.

Sinochem Group was founded in 1950. Its predecessor was China National Chemicals Import and Export Corporation was China's largest trading firm. Sinochem Group is the key state-owned enterprise under the supervision of State-owned Assets Supervision and Administration Commission of the State Council (SASAC). Sinochem's headquarters is located in Xiong'an, Hebei.

Sinochem's core businesses include energy, agriculture, chemicals, real estate and financial service. It is one of Chinese four state oil companies, China's biggest agricultural input company (fertilizer, seed and agrochemicals), China's leading chemical service company.

Sinochem currently owns more than 300 subsidiaries inside and outside China. It controls several listed companies including Sinochem International (SZSE: 600500), Sinofert (SEHK: 297) and Franshion Properties (SEHK: 817), and is the largest shareholder of Far East Horizon (SEHK: 3360). In June 2009, Sinochem Group established Sinochem Corporation as the vehicle for potential group IPO.

Sinochem Group is China's earliest entrant in Fortune Global 500 and has been on the list 25 times, ranking 139th in 2016. Sinochem's recent revenue in 2020 was 54.2 billion renminbi. In 2025, Sinochem ranked 7th in "China's 500 Most Valuable Brand's" list by World Brand Lab.

== Corporate structure ==
Sinochem deals primarily in petrochemicals distribution, but also in synthetic rubber, plastics, and agrochemicals. It operates through more than 100 subsidiaries in China and abroad in concerns ranging from petroleum trading to real estate. Formerly owned directly by the Chinese government, Sinochem converted to a joint-stock company in 2009; initially it is owned by newly formed Sinochem Group (98%) and publicly traded Chinese shipping giant COSCO (2%). The move was designed to signal Sinochem's transformation to a market-oriented company.

== History ==
Founded in 1950, it is China's largest trading company and its first multinational conglomerate.

=== China Import Co., Ltd. ===
On 10 March 1950, in an aim to unify domestic trade, fulfill the set target of the import & export volume, lead the domestic market, strike a balance between supply and demand, and boost the recovery and development of domestic production, the central government made a decision to set up a national level foreign trade company under the leadership of the Trade Ministry. The predecessor of Sinochem, China National Import Corporation, was formally established. China National Import was the first state-owned foreign trading company of the PRC.

=== China Import & Export Co., Ltd. ===
On 8 January 1951, the preparation team for China National Import & Export Co. was set up. The staff of the company came from China National Import Corp and its subsidiaries in North China. On Feb. 13, entrusted by the Trade Ministry, China National Import & Export Co took on the responsibility to oversee the import & export business of some Hong Kong institutions. When it was put into operation on March 1, the main task of the company was to tear down the blockade and trade embargo imposed by the West, and conduct trade with capitalist countries.

In 1952, the company opened an overseas representative office in East Berlin, its first such office.

During the 1950s and 1960s, the company procured important resources like rubber, petroleum, and fertilizer to support China's industrialization campaigns. It initially focused on trade with the other socialist states, especially the Soviet Union and East Germany, but later increased trade with regional neighbors like Singapore and Japan.

=== China National Chemicals Import & Export Co., Ltd. ===
On 1 January 1961, after restructuring of MOFTEC's affiliated administrative units and enterprises, China National Import & Export Co was changed into China National Chemicals Import & Export Corp.

=== China National Chemicals Import & Export Corp. ===
On 12 June 1965, MOFTEC decided to standardize the names of foreign trade companies. On July 16, China National Import & Export Co was changed into China National Import & Export Corp.

By 1994, the company had overseas branches in more than 20 other countries.

In 1999, the company hired consulting firm McKinsey & Company to improve its management and internal controls. This was the first time a central SOE of China had hired a foreign consulting firm.

In 2001, company Chairman Liu Deshu implemented the "1-2-3" strategy for the company's development. Through this approach, the company focused on market competition ("one ability"), expanding into foreign and domestic markets up and down the industry chain ("two expansions"), and developing core businesses of petroleum, fertilizer, and chemical products ("three core business areas").

=== Sinochem Group ===
On 10 November 2003, Sinochem changed its name from China National Chemicals Import & Export Corporation to Sinochem Corporation with the approval of the State Assets Administration and Supervision Commission and the State Administration for Industry and Commerce.

In August 2009, Sinochem bought the United Kingdom-based oil company Emerald Energy.

In November 2011, the company announced that it expected to raise ¥35 billion in its IPO, making it the largest IPO of the year in China and the sixth largest in the country's history. Funds from the IPO would be put towards the development of an oil refinery in Quanzhou, a port city in Fujian province.

In 2016, Ning Gaoning became Sinochem Chairman and Secretary of its Party Committee, taking over for Liu Deshu who had been in those roles from 1998 to 2015. In 2017, Ning implemented an "in science we trust" strategy for Sinochem. Through this strategy, Sinochem focused on innovation, industrial upgrading, and investment. As part of this approach, Sinochem created positions for chief scientists and chief technology officers at all levels of Sinochem, from the holding company to strategic development units. During Ning's tenure, Sinochem emphasized its core business of petrochemicals and chemicals, investing, and a limited diversification in agriculture, real estate, and finance. Ning focused Sinochem on improving technology and making capital investments rather than acquiring and operating fixed assets. Ning resigned from Sinochem in 2022.

As of 2024, Sinochem is one of the world's largest petroleum and chemicals companies.

In October 2025, the company relocated its headquarters to Xiong'an, bringing about 1,000 employees.

=== U.S. investment prohibition ===
In August 2020, the United States Department of Defense named Sinochem as one of several companies backed by the People's Liberation Army. In November 2020, Donald Trump issued an executive order prohibiting any American company or individual from owning shares in companies that the United States Department of Defense has listed as having links to the People's Liberation Army, which included Sinochem.

== Subsidiaries ==
- China Foreign Economy and Trade Trust (100%)
