= Garst =

Garst may refer to:

== People ==
- David Garst (1926–2006), American agriculturalist
- Lula Woods Garst (1897–1974), American physician
- Roswell Garst (1898–1977), American agriculturalist
- Warren Garst (1850–1924), American politician
- Mary Garst (born 1928), American cattle breeder in the Iowa Women's Hall of Fame
- Shannon Garst (1894–1981), American author, lived in Douglas, Wyoming

== Places ==
- Garst House (Greenville, Ohio), a museum, listed on the National Register of Historic Places (NRHP) in Darke County
- Roswell and Elizabeth Garst Farmstead Historic District, a farm in Guthrie County, Iowa, United States
- John Garst House, a historic place in Ashland County, Ohio, United States
- Garst Airport, in Nishnabotna Township, Atchison County, Missouri, United States

== Other ==
- Garst Seed Company, American producer of hybrid seeds

== See also ==
- Gorst, a surname, including a list of people with the name
- Garston (disambiguation)
