= Ren (surname) =

Rén (任)
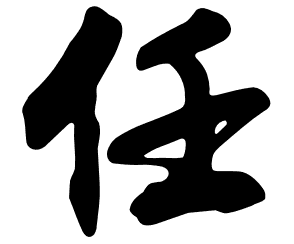
- Pronunciation: Rén (Mandarin); Cantonese: Jyutping: jam4, Middle Chinese: /ȵiɪmH/ Old Chinese: (Baxter–Sagart): /*n[ə]m-s/ (Zhengzhang): /*njɯms/
- Language: Chinese

Origin
- Language: Old Chinese

Other names
- Variant forms: Yam, Yum, Jen (Mandarin Wade Giles)
- Derivative: Im (Korean surname)

Rén is the Mandarin pinyin romanisation of the Chinese surname written 任 in Chinese script. It is romanised as Jen in Wade–Giles, and Yam or Yum in Cantonese. It is listed 58th in the Song dynasty classic text Hundred Family Surnames. As of 2008, it is the 59th most common surname in China, shared by 4.2 million people. In 2019 it was the 49th most common surname in Mainland China.

The character 任 is typically pronounced (pinyin: rèn; Jyutping: jam6), but as a surname is pronounced "rén," as well as in Ren County in Hebei.

== Ancient Surname ==
Rèn (妊) is a variant of the surname and one of the Eight Great Surnames of Chinese Antiquity. Unlike 任, it is a very rare surname.

The Zuo Zhuan states that the surname Ren is a descendant of Fuxi's surname Fēng.

Some consider the two surnames to be related.

== Notable people ==
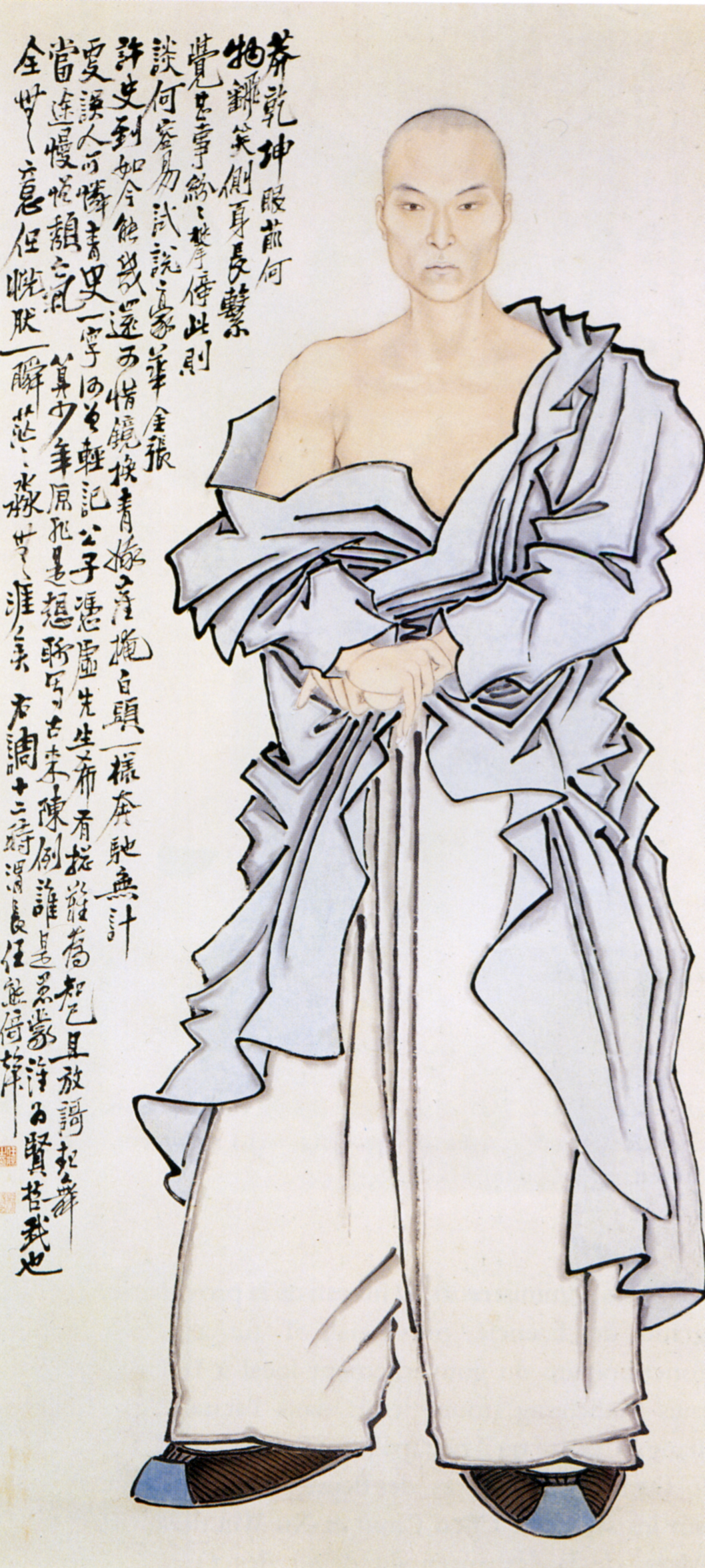
Self portrait of Ren Xiong

- Gish Jen (Ren Bilian; born 1955), American writer
- Ren Bishi (1904–1950), early Communist leader
- Ren Bonian (1840–1896), painter of the Shanghai School, and the nephew of Ren Xiong and Ren Xun
- Ren Cancan (born 1986), world champion female boxer
- Carolyn Ren, Chinese-Canadian microfluidics researcher
- Simon Yam (Ren Dahua; born 1955), Hong Kong actor
- Ren Fuchen (1884–1918), Soviet Red Army commander
- Ren Guang (任光; died 29 AD), Eastern Han dynasty general, one of the Yuntai 28 generals
- Ren Guang (1900–1941), composer
- Ren Han (born 1984), artist
- Ren Hang (1987–2017), photographer
- Ren Hang (born 1989), football player
- Ren Hao (任豪) (born 1995), Chinese singer, member of R1SE
- Ren Huan (died 927), Later Tang general and chancellor
- Yam Kim-fai (任劍輝, 1913–1989), opera actress
- Ren Hui (born 1983), female speed skater and Olympic medalist
- Ren Jialun (born 1989), Chinese actor and singer
- Ren Jianxin (1925–2024), President of the Supreme People's Court of China
- Ren Jianxin (born 1959), founder and president of ChemChina
- Selina Jen (Ren Jiaxuan; born 1981), Taiwanese singer, member of S.H.E
- Ren Jinping (1896–unknown), Chinese film director
- Ren Jun (died 204), Eastern Han dynasty military officer
- Ren Junfei (born 1990), basketball player
- Ren Jiyu (1916–2009), philosopher and scholar
- Edward Yum (Ren Liangxian; born 1979), Hong Kong politician, son of Yum Sin-ling
- Ren Mei'e (1913–2008), geologist
- Yam Kai-bong (任啟邦; Rèn Qǐ Bāng, born 1978), Hong Kong politician
- Ren Pengnian (1894–1968), Chinese film director
- Ren Renfa (1254–1327), Yuan dynasty artist and irrigation expert
- Ren Rong (1917–2017), general and Communist Party Chief of Tibet Autonomous Region
- Ren Rongrong (任溶溶; 1923–2022), children's literature writer and translator
- Ren Runhou (1957–2014), former Vice Governor of Shanxi province
- Ren Shang (died 118), Eastern Han Protector General of the Western Regions
- Yum Sin-ling (Ren Shanning; born 1948), Hong Kong politician
- Ren Suxi (born 1988), Chinese actress and singer
- Ren Wanding (born 1944), founder of Chinese Human Rights League
- Richie Jen (Ren Xianqi; born 1966), Taiwanese singer and actor
- Ren Xin (born 1989), football player
- Ren Xinmin (1915–2017), aerospace engineer
- Ren Xiong (1823–1857), painter of the Shanghai School
- Ren Xuefeng (1965–2019), Party Chief of Guangzhou and Deputy Party Chief of Guangdong and Chongqing
- Ren Xun (1835–1893), painter and a brother of Ren Xiong
- Ren Yaxiang (died 662), Tang dynasty general and chancellor
- Ren Ye (born 1986), female field hockey player and Olympic medalist
- Ren Yexiang (born 1961), actress
- Vivian Wing-Wah Yam (Ren Yonghua; born 1963), Hong Kong chemist
- Ren Yongshun (born 1985), football player
- Ren Zhengfei (born 1944), founder, chairman and CEO of Huawei
- Joseph Yam (任志剛; Rèn Zhì Gāng, born 1948), Hong Kong statistician
- Chih-Kung Jen (Ren Zhigong; 1906–1995), Chinese-American physicist
- Ren Zhigu (fl. 692), chancellor of Empress Wu Zetian
- Ren Zhiqiang (born 1951), Chinese property tycoon and critic of the government
- Ren Zhongyi (1914–2005), Communist Party Chief of Liaoning and Guangdong province
- Ren Zhu (died 1867), Nien Rebellion leader
- Alex Yam (任梓铭; Rèn Zǐ Míng, born 1981), Singaporean politician
- Ren Ziwei (born 1997), speed skater

== Fictional characters ==
- Wuying Ren, a character from Shenmue II
- Kylo Ren, a character from the Star Wars sequel trilogy
- Hakuryuu Ren, Fourth Imperial Prince of Kou in the anime Magi: The Labyrinth of Magic and Magi: The Kingdom of Magic
- Lie Ren, a character from the American animated series RWBY

== See also ==
- Ren (disambiguation)
- Ren (given name)
- MC Ren, rapper from the group N.W.A
