= Ren Xia =

- 任霞
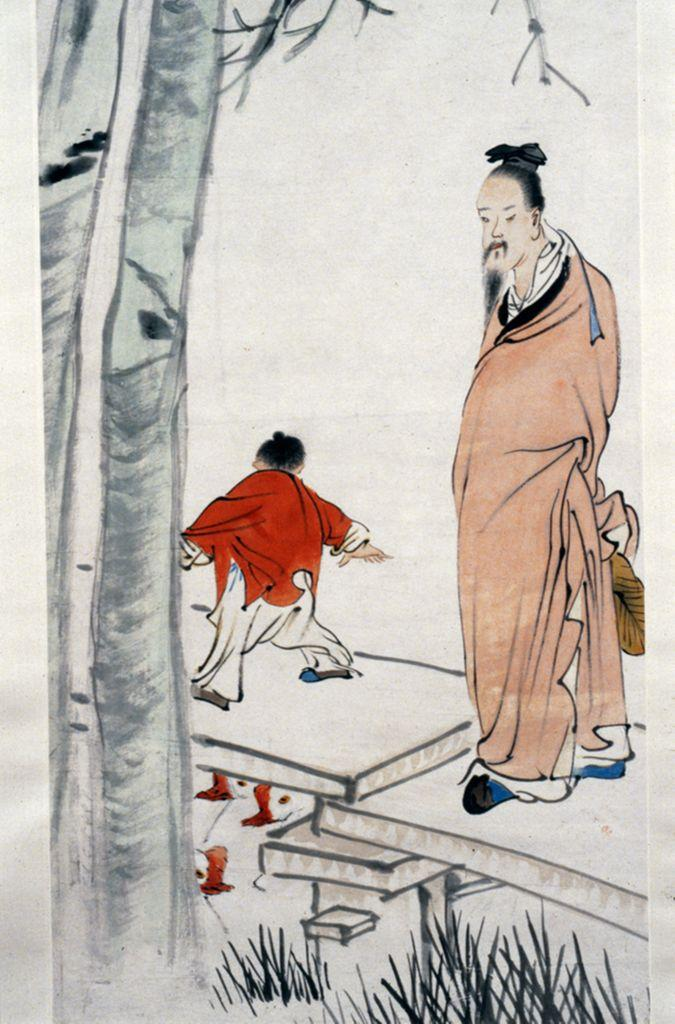
- Ren Xia, detail from Wang Xizhi Watching Geese, 1896
- Born: 1876
- Died: 1920 (aged 43–44)
- Occupation: Painter
- Parent(s): Ren Bonian
- Relatives: Ren Jin

Ren Xia (Chinese:任霞; 1876 – 1920), also known by her courtesy name Yuhua (Chinese: 雨华) was a Qing Dynasty Chinese painter in Shanghai

Ren Xia was a native of Shanyin and daughter of Ren Bonian, one of the "Four Rens" along with Ren Xiong, Ren Xun and Ren Yu, a quartet who were the leading figures in painting in nineteenth century Shanghai. She learned painting from her father and after his death in 1895, she sold his paintings as well as her own works signed with his name to support her remaining family, including her younger brother, the painter Ren Jin. She married impoverished scholar Wu Shaoqing and they had no children.

The Ren painters of Shanghai, including Ren Xia, embraced a lively and quirky style, with individualized and sometimes comical depictions of people, animals, and flowers. Ren Xia herself also excelled at landscapes and depictions of Buddha.

One work by Ren Xia, Wang Xizhi Watching Geese'(1896), is now owned by the Metropolitan Museum of Art. It is a hanging scroll depicting the legendary Jin dynasty calligrapher Wang Xizhi. Legend has it that his calligraphy was inspired by the graceful movements of goose necks, so he is often depicted in traditional painting watching geese. Ren Xia's depiction, in keeping with Shanghai style, is a less serious departure from traditional depictions. Wang Xizhi is depicted as a humorous stock figure, his servant is wandering excitedly, and the geese are barely visible beneath the bridge.

Another hanging scroll by Ren Xia, Women Washing Silk, was owned by collector and painter Howard Wong. It is unusual for the colophons added in 1941 by a trio of artists, Lü Wan, Wu Hufan, and Wu Mai, which identify the artist of the unsigned work as Ren Xia and her date of birth, unavailable from other sources, as 1876. Its theme is from Washing Silk, a popular Ming dynasty opera.
