= Whiterock Conservancy =

Whiterock Conservancy is a 501(c)(3) land trust located in west-central Iowa that stewards over 4,000 acres of contiguous land located in the Middle Raccoon River watershed, and an additional 1,000 non-contiguous land located in the Brushy and Middle Raccoon River watersheds. The Whiterock landscape was almost exclusively made possible by an extraordinary planned land gift from the Garst family to Whiterock Conservancy. The landscape is a mosaic of agricultural land, wetlands, preserved prairie and oak savanna, riverine woodlands, and upland forest. The land is also home to the historic Roswell and Elizabeth Garst Farmstead, which hosted Soviet Premier Nikita Khrushchev in 1959, and is now on the National Register of Historic Places. The land is used for recreation, environmental conservation, and for the production of agricultural products, and is managed as a working landscape where cultural, environmental, agricultural, and recreational land uses are held in equal importance.

== Sustainable land management ==
Whiterock Conservancy currently stewards over 5,000 acres using economic and environmental sustainability principles.

=== Oak Savanna restoration ===
The predominant plant community at Whiterock is oak-dominated forest, covering about 1,200 acres of the total landscape. Oak savanna, an ecosystem that was once widely distributed in the state of Iowa, is currently one of the most endangered in the region, with less than 0.1% of the original tract remaining. Whiterock Conservancy is actively restoring oak savanna habitat through the reintroduction of fire, periodic grazing, and mechanical removal of invasive shrubs and trees.

Oak savanna is characterized by two layers: an overstory of scattered, widespread oaks (mostly bur oaks and black oaks) with an understory of wildflowers, sedges and grasses.

=== Native prairies ===
Much like the state of Iowa, the vast majority of the Whiterock Conservancy landscape was historically covered in tall and mid-grass prairies. Today, very little remains. Currently, a total of 26 acres of native prairie remnants and 600 acres of reconstructed prairie are present on the property, 240-acres of which were recently planted in the fall of 2008, and 110 acres in 2009.

While highly intact as a land base, much of Whiterock is in need of intense restoration efforts to protect and conserve rare habitats and restore key ecosystem functions and services. Like oak savannas, prairies on Whiterock Conservancy lands are also managed with prescribed fire and mechanical removal of invasive species. In addition, some of our prairie acreages are being integrated into the rotational grazing program.

=== Prescribed fire ===
Whiterock Conservancy focuses on using a variety of tools to foster a healthy and resilient environment. Historically, fire was an important part of Iowa's landscape. It helped to create and maintain habitat, recycle nutrients and maintain a level of ecosystem functional balance on the land that helped minimize the impact of other disturbances, like flooding. Fire, an ecosystem disturbance, has been dramatically curbed on the Iowa landscape over the last 100 years, resulting in a highly degraded and poorly functioning Iowa ecosystem.

=== Rotational grazing ===
Agricultural production is an important part of the Iowa landscape. Although economic production is a primary for many landowners, some production systems, such as grazing beef cattle, are also an important part of the land's native disturbance regime.

Whiterock Conservancy uses cattle grazing to model a system that helps rural landowners derive income from the land while also achieving restoration and conservation goals. In 2009, Whiterock Conservancy implemented a sustainable pasture management system to create more effective cattle rotations to protect ground cover. Interior fences were constructed to exclude cattle from riparian areas.

== Recreation ==
Whiterock Conservancy uses its 5,500+ acres for sustainable outdoor recreation with the intention of helping the public reconnect with the outdoors by having fun on, and learning about, Iowa's diverse landscape. Its 30 miles of trails are multi-use and offer access to hiking, camping, mountain biking, and horseback riding.

The main office of Whiterock Conservancy is the historic Roswell and Elizabeth Garst Farmstead, which is also an active bed and breakfast and part of the Whiterock Resort. In 1997, the farm house and surrounding lands became an agritourism destination which later became the Whiterock Resort in 2007.

Another historic building located on Whiterock Conservancy is the Heeder barn, located on the Middle Raccoon River in the heart of the conservancy. Currently used as an event facility for weddings and corporate retreats, this barn was converted from a working barn to a place for celebration during prohibition.

== See also ==
- Coon Rapids, Iowa
- Roswell and Elizabeth Garst Farmstead Historic District
- Iowa Natural Heritage Foundation
- Iowa Department of Natural Resources
