= Gorst =

Gorst is an English, Welsh, and Jèrriais surname of Norman origin. It may refer to:

- Charles Crawford Gorst (1885–1956), American educator and bird-imitator
- Derek Gorst (1903–1981), British actor
- Eldon Gorst, KCB (1861–1911), Consul-General in Egypt from 1907 to 1911
- Hester Gaskell Holland Gorst (1887–1992), British writer and artist
- Ian Gorst (born 1969), the Chief Minister of Jersey
- Jim Gorst (1922–2020), Canadian politician in BC
- John Eldon Gorst PC, QC, FRS (1835–1916), British lawyer and politician
- John Michael Gorst (1928–2010), British Conservative Party politician
- Fedor Gorst (born 2000), Russian professional pool player
- Nina Gorst (1869–1926), British novelist

== See also ==
- Gorst, Washington, unincorporated community at the head of Sinclair Inlet in Kitsap County, Washington, United States
- Chourst
- Corston (disambiguation)
- Garst (disambiguation)
- Gorstan
