= Ning Gaoning =

Chinese manufacturing executive

- 宁高宁
- Born: 9 November 1958 (age 67); Binzhou, Shandong, China
- Other name: Frank Ning
- Education: University of Pittsburgh; Shandong University
- Occupation: Manufacturing executive
- Years active: 1987–present
- Title: Chairman of Syngenta
- Political party: Chinese Communist Party

Chinese name
- Simplified Chinese: 宁高宁
- Traditional Chinese: 寧高寧
Transcriptions
Standard Mandarin
- Hanyu Pinyin: Nìng Gāoníng

Ning Gaoning (Chinese: 宁高宁; born 9 November 1958), also known as Frank Ning, is a Chinese manufacturing executive.

In 2023, he resigned as chairman of Sinochem, remaining chairman of Syngenta.

== Biographical details ==
He was born in Binzhou, Shandong on 9 November 1958. He graduated from Shandong University with a bachelor's degree in economics and earned an MBA from the University of Pittsburgh's Katz School of Business.

After returning to China from the United States, Ning joined a central state-owned enterprise, China Resources. Ning eventually became its Chairman. During his career at China Resources, he led over 30 major mergers and acquisitions.

In 2004, the Central Organization Department transferred him to be the Chairman of China National Cereals, Oils and Foodstuffs Corporation (COFCO). Ning initiated approximately 50 mergers while leading COFCO.

He is also the Chairman of Hong Kong Building and Loan Agency Limited and Deputy Chairman of China Vanke company Limited. Ning has been recognized five times as one of the 25 most influential business leaders by Chinese Entrepreneur magazine. In 2009, Ning was named Asia Business Leader of the Year by CNBC Asia Pacific. In November 2012 Ning was elected as a member of the Central Commission for Discipline Inspection.

In January 2016 he was succeeded as COFCO's head by Zhao Shuanglian. That year, Ning became the Chairman and Party Secretary of Sinochem.

In 2017, Ning implemented an "in science we trust" strategy for Sinochem. Through this strategy, Sinochem focused on innovation, industrial upgrading, and investment. The enterprise focused on its core business of petrochemicals and chemicals, investing, and a limited diversification in agriculture, real estate, and finance.

Ning was elected Chairman of the Board of Directors of Syngenta on 16 July 2018.

When ChemChina's chairman Ren Jianxin retired in July 2018, Ning was appointed chairman of ChemChina, while retaining his chairmanship of Sinochem Group. In September 2020 he confirmed that ChemChina and Sinochem Group were discussing a merger. At the time, he was chairman of both companies. As a consequence of his resignation on October 8, 2022 from Sinochem holdings, Pirelli & C. S.p.A. announced he'd also resigned from all roles held on the company's board of directors. In March 2023, he was succeeded as chairman of Sinochem Holdings by Li Fanrong. Ning remained chairman of Syngenta.

== Media ==
Ning has made frequent media appearances. He has written numerous books, including a collection of essays titled Why?

Business positions
Preceded by Zhou Mingchen (周明臣)	Chairman of COFCO Group; 2004–2016	Succeeded by Zhao Shuanglian
Preceded by Liu Deshu	Chairman of Sinochem; 2016–2018	Succeeded by ?
Preceded by Ren Jianxin	Chairman of ChemChina; 2018–2022	Succeeded by Position revoked
