= Carston =

Carston is a given name and a surname. Notable people with the name include:

- Robert Carston Arneson (1930–1992), American sculptor and professor of ceramics
- Cecil Carston (1927–2014), New Zealand cricketer
- Robyn Carston, linguist and academic specialising in pragmatics, semantics and the philosophy of language
- Carston Catcheside OBE (1899–1987), English rugby union player

== See also ==
- Carson (surname)
- Garston (disambiguation)
- Karsten
