= Coon Rapids =

Coon Rapids is the name of two places in the United States:

- Coon Rapids, Iowa
- Coon Rapids, Minnesota
