= Tyrone Hayes =

American biologist

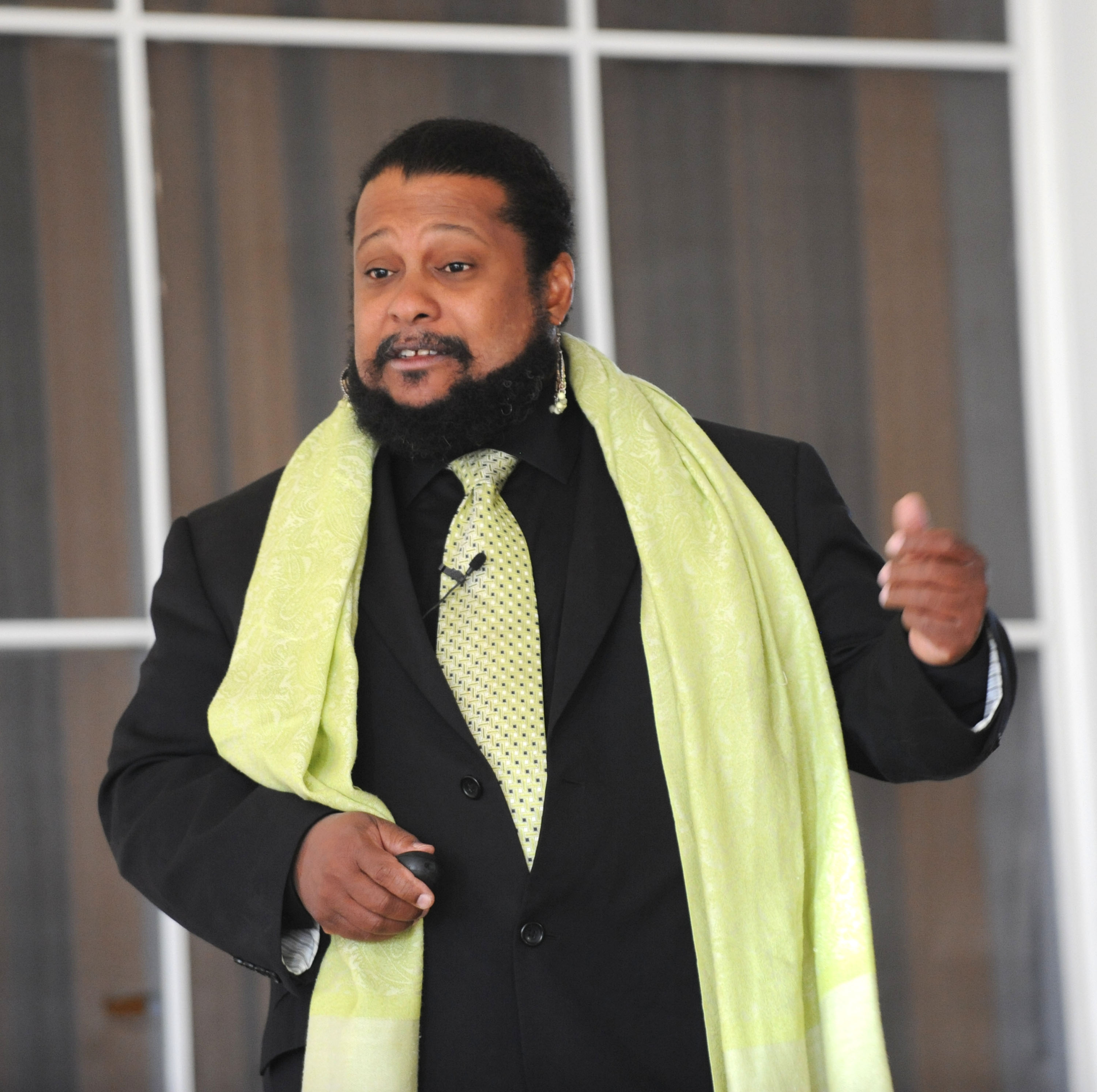
- Hayes at King University in 2013
- Born: July 29, 1967 (age 59); Columbia, South Carolina, U.S.
- Education: Harvard University (BA, MA); University of California, Berkeley (PhD)
- Occupation: Professor

Tyrone B. Hayes (born July 29, 1967) is an American biologist and professor of integrative biology at the University of California, Berkeley. He is known for his research in frogs, concluding that the herbicide atrazine is an endocrine disruptor that demasculinizes male frogs, causing them to display female characteristics. Hayes is an advocate for the critical review and regulation of pesticides as well as other chemicals that may cause adverse health effects. He has presented hundreds of papers, discussions, and seminars on his research's conclusion that environmental contaminants have played a major role in the global amphibian decline as well as being linked to the many health disparities that occur in minority and low income populations.

Hayes' research into atrazine as an endocrine disruptor has been contested by Syngenta – the company that manufactures atrazine – and the Australian Pesticides and Veterinary Medicines Authority.

In 2023, he was elected to the National Academy of Sciences.

== Early life and education ==
Tyrone Hayes was born in 1967 in Columbia, South Carolina to Romeo and Susie Hayes. As a child he showed great interest in lizards and frogs. He was particularly interested in the way frogs morphed from tadpoles into their adult form. He won a state science fair with research that showed that anole lizards had to be awake in order to change color. He graduated from Dreher High School in 1985 and earned both his A.B. and M.A. in biology in 1989 from Harvard University. His dissertation focused on the genetic and environmental mechanisms determining the sex of the wood frog. He continued his studies at the University of California, Berkeley. There he received his Ph.D. in integrative biology in 1993 for his study of the role that hormone play in mediating developmental responses to environmental changes in amphibians.

== Career ==
After graduating from Harvard University, Hayes worked as a technician and freelance consultant from 1990 to 1992 for Tiburon, California-based Biosystems, Inc. Hayes has held an academic appointment (professorship) at the University of California, Berkeley since completing his doctoral research there in 1992; he was hired as a graduate student instructor in 1992, became an assistant professor in 1994, associate professor in 2000, and professor in 2003 in the Department of Integrative Biology, Molecular Toxicology, Group in Endocrinology, Museum of Vertebrate Zoology, Energy and Resources Group, University of California, Berkeley. In 2021, Hayes was appointed to the position of Department Co-Chair. He advanced to the position of associate dean for Diversity, Equity and Inclusion in the College of Letters and Science at Berkeley in 2023.

Hayes’ scientific research has focused on the potential of genetic adaptation and the role of hormones in the development of the amphibian. His investigations have shown that chemical agents, such as a commonly used herbicide, have the ability to negatively impact the sexual development of the amphibian, even when such toxins are present in low concentrations. Hayes has taken an interest in the hormonal regulation and development of aggressive behavior. He has also been active with the National Science Foundation Review Panel since 1995, and he has served on several other advisory boards as well.

=== Atrazine research ===
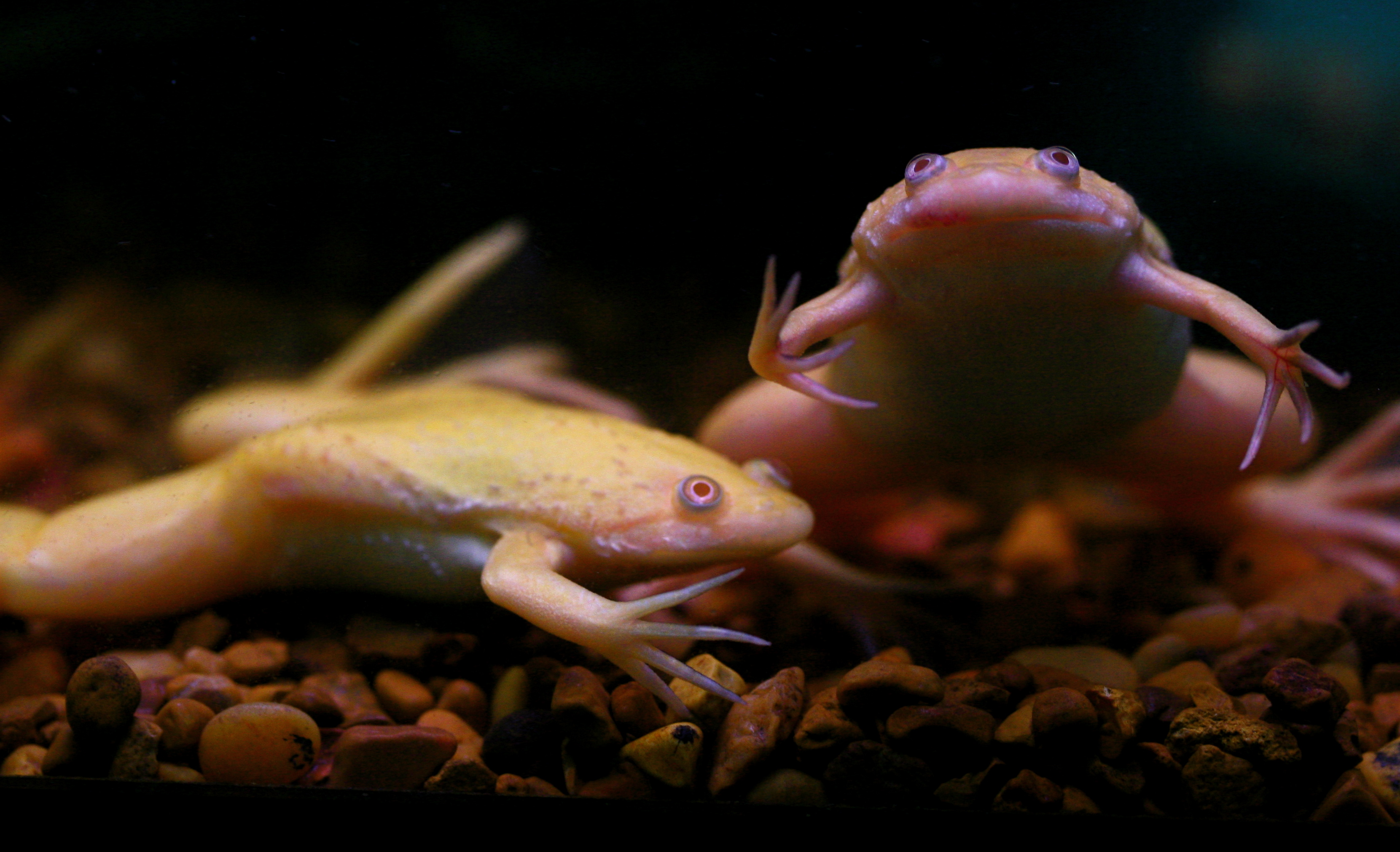
Xenopus laevis, the African Clawed frog

In 1997, the consulting firm EcoRisk, Inc. paid Hayes to join a panel of experts conducting studies for the Swiss pharmaceutical company Novartis (later Syngenta) on the herbicide atrazine. When Hayes' research found unexpected toxicities for atrazine, he reported them to the panel, however the panel and company were resistant to his findings. He wanted to repeat his work to validate it but Novartis refused funding for further research; he resigned from the panel and obtained other funding to repeat the experiments.

In 2002 Hayes published findings that he says replicate what he found while he was working for EcoRisk, that developing male African clawed frogs and leopard frogs exhibited female characteristics after exposure to atrazine, first in the Proceedings of the National Academy of Sciences (PNAS) and then in Nature.

In 2007, Hayes was a co-author on a paper that detailed atrazine inducing mammary and prostate cancer in laboratory rodents and highlighted atrazine as a potential cause of reproductive cancers in humans. In 2007, Hayes presented results of his studies to the U.S. National Institute of Environmental Health Sciences showing chemical castration in frogs; individuals of both sexes had developed bisexual reproductive organs. In 2010, Hayes published research in PNAS describing laboratory work showing how exposure to atrazine turned male tadpoles into females with impaired fertility.

The U.S. Environmental Protection Agency (EPA) and its independent Scientific Advisory Panel (SAP) examined all available studies on this topic and concluded that "atrazine does not adversely affect amphibian gonadal development based on a review of laboratory and field studies." The EPA and its SAP made recommendations concerning proper study design needed for further investigation into this issue. As required by the EPA, two experiments were conducted under Good Laboratory Practices (GLP) and inspection by the EPA and German regulatory authorities. The paper concluded "These studies demonstrate that long-term exposure of larval X. laevis to atrazine at concentrations ranging from 0.01 to 100 microg/l does not affect growth, larval development, or sexual differentiation." A report written in Environmental Science and Technology (May 15, 2008) cites the independent work of researchers in Japan, who were unable to replicate Hayes' work. "The scientists found no hermaphrodite frogs; no increase in aromatase as measured by aromatase mRNA induction; and no increase in vitellogenin, another marker of feminization." In 2010, the Australian Pesticides and Veterinary Medicines Authority (APVMA) responded to Hayes' 2010 published paper, by stating that his findings "do not provide sufficient evidence to justify a reconsideration of current regulations which are based on a very extensive dataset."

== Advocacy ==
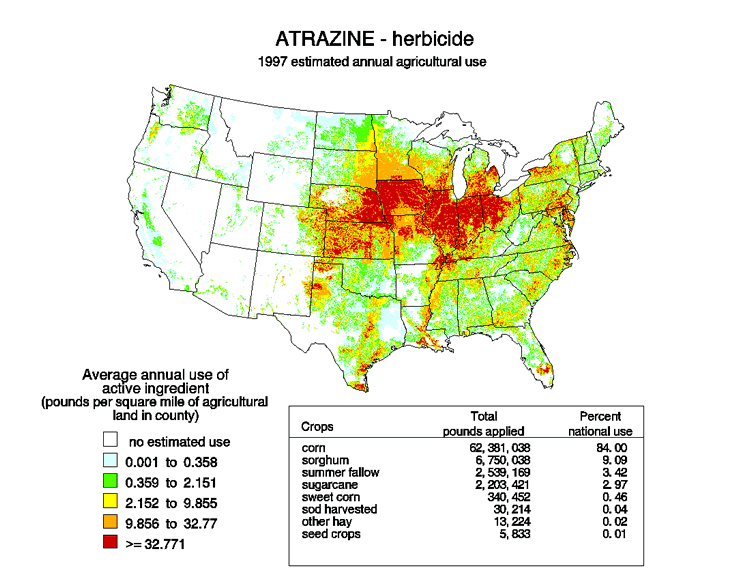
A map of pounds per square mile of atrazine application in the U.S. in 1997

Since publishing his research on atrazine as an endocrine disruptor, Hayes has become an advocate for banning atrazine. According to Hayes, the link between atrazine and altered "aromatase and estrogen production has been demonstrated... in fish, frogs, alligators, birds, turtles, rats and human cells", and, "I believe that the preponderance of the evidence shows atrazine to be a risk to wildlife and humans. I would not want to be exposed to it, nor do I think it should be released into the environment." He travels and lectures extensively to both scientific and lay audiences.

He also has raised issues of environmental racism, warning that "if you’re black or Hispanic, you’re more likely to live or work in areas where you’re exposed to crap". While a biologist on the Public Broadcasting Service, National Geographic program Strange Days, he expressed his concerns for human health, particularly that of minority and low-paid workers exposure to agricultural chemicals.

Research published by Hayes and other scientists was used as evidence in a class action lawsuit against Syngenta by 15 water providers in Illinois that was settled for 105 million dollars in May 2012, which reimbursed more than 1,000 water systems for the costs of filtering atrazine from drinking water, although the company denies any wrongdoing.

== Conflict with atrazine manufacturer Syngenta ==
A long running conflict between Hayes and agricultural chemical manufacturer Syngenta was described as "one of the weirdest feuds in the history of science,” by Dashka Slater in her 2012 profile of Hayes in Mother Jones magazine.

In 2014, New Yorker writer Rachel Aviv reported that Syngenta might have been orchestrating an attack not only on Hayes' scientific credibility, but on other scientists as well whose studies have shown atrazine to have adverse effects on the environment and/or human and animal health.

Aviv reported that Syngenta had criticized Hayes' science and conduct in press releases, letters to the editor, and through a formal ethics complaint filed at University of California-Berkeley. Internal Syngenta documents from 2005 released by a class-action lawsuit in 2014 show ways that Syngenta conspired to discredit Hayes, including attempting to get journals to retract his work, and investigating his funding and private life. In one of the 2005 e-mails obtained by class-action lawsuit plaintiffs, the company's communications consultants had written about plans to track Hayes' speaking engagements and prepare audiences with Syngenta's counterpoints to Hayes's message on atrazine. Syngenta subsequently stated that many of the documents unsealed in the lawsuits refer to "ideas that were never implemented."

== Allegations of workplace misconduct ==
In 2010, Syngenta forwarded an ethics complaint to the University of California Berkeley, complaining that Hayes had been sending sexually explicit and harassing e-mails to Syngenta scientists, including quoting the rapper DMX. Some of these emails were obtained and published by Gawker. Legal counsel from the university responded that Hayes had acknowledged sending letters having "unprofessional and offensive" content, and that he had agreed not to use similar language in future communications. According to Hayes, the situation had escalated after Syngenta executive Tim Pastoor had threatened Hayes and his family.

== Filmography and other work ==
Hayes' work was featured in the 2008 documentary film Flow: For Love of Water. In 2010, Hayes and filmmaker Penelope Jagessar Chaffer were featured on a TED Talk together for TEDWomen, discussing chemical exposure in pregnancy, in light of Jagessar's film: Toxic Baby. He appeared in the 2012 documentary film Last Call at the Oasis. Hayes is the subject of The Frog Scientist, a biographical book for children, first published in 2009. Hayes appeared in another TED Talk in 2018. This talk centered around Hayes' early interest in science - particularly frogs - as well as his career development, research in endocrine disruption, his ongoing feud with Synenta, and the disproportionate way environmentally harmful chemicals affect the lives of minorities and the poor. In 2019, Hayes was the subject of the children's book, "There's Something in the Water", published by the nonprofit STEM4Real. The book focuses on Tyrone's early life and how his observations as a young child fueled his passion for studying frogs.

== Personal life ==
Hayes lives in California with his wife, Kathy Kim. He has won several awards for his teaching and his research, including the Distinguished Teaching Award from University of California, Berkeley in 2002 and the President's Citation Award from the American Institute of Biological Science in 2004. He was also awarded the National Geographic Emerging Explorer Award and the Jennifer Altman Award in 2005.

== See also ==
- Ecophysiology
- Environmental toxicology
- Environmentalism
- Pesticides in the United States
