= Adama Agricultural Solutions =

Israeli manufacturing company

- Type: Public
- Traded as: SZSE: 000553
- Industry: Agribusiness
- Founded: 1945; 81 years ago
- Headquarters: Ashdod, Israel
- Key people: Gael Hili (CEO)
- Products: Crop protection (herbicides, insecticides, fungicides, plant growth regulators, seed treatments), food additives, dietary supplements, aroma products
- Revenue: US$4.051 billion (2025)
- Operating income: US$182 million (2025)
- Net income: ▼US$147 million (2025)
- Owner: ChemChina (100%)
- Number of employees: 6684 (2018)
- Parent: Syngenta Group
- Website: adama.com

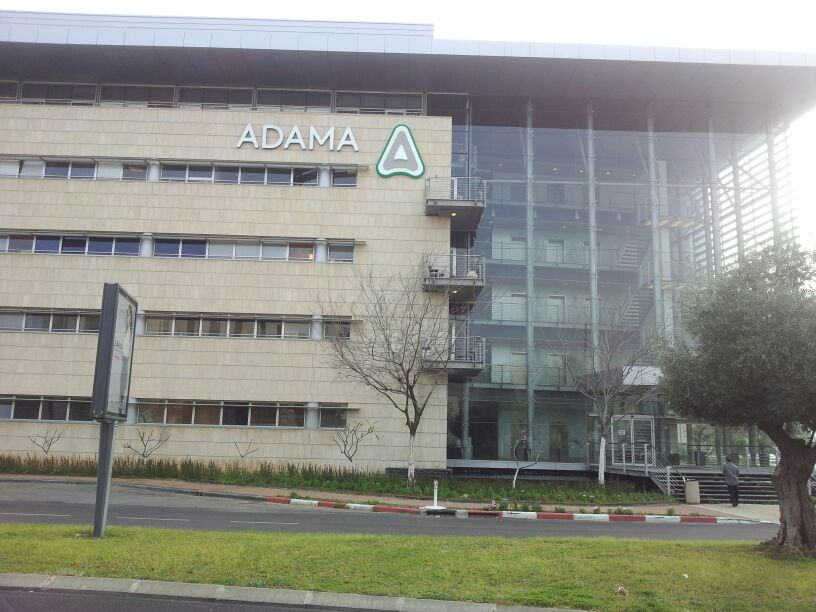
Adama headquarters in Airport City, Israel

ADAMA Ltd. (Hebrew: אדמה בע"מ; Chinese: 安道麦) is a global crop-protection company that develops and distrubutes, herbicides, insecticides and fungicides. The company operates internationally, with direct presence in 20 agricultural markets.

The company originated from two early Israeli agrochemical manufacturers: Agan and Makhteshim Chemical Works. In 2014, the company changes its name to ADAMA Agricultural Solutions.

ADAMA is headquartered in Airport City, Israel. Since 2020, it has been part of the Syngenta Group, an agricultural technology group headquartered in Switzerland and owned by Sinochem Holdings. The company’s shares have been traded on the Shenzhen Stock Exchange since 2017, following its merger with Hubei Sanonda Co., Ltd.

As of 2026, ADAMA employs more than 7,600 people globally.

== History ==
ADAMA originated from two Israeli agrochemical companies: Agan, founded in 1945, and Makhteshim Chemical Works, established in 1952 in the Negev region. The two companies operated independently for several decades before merging in 1998 to form Makhteshim Agan Industries Ltd., creating an integrated crop-protection manufacturer with expanding international operations.

During the 2000s, the company grew through acquisitions and product development, becoming one of the larger global producers of off-patent crop-protection products. In 2011, China National Chemical Corporation (ChemChina) acquired a controlling stake in the company. In 2014, the company was rebranded as ADAMA Agricultural Solutions Ltd., adopting unified global branding across its operations. In 2016, ChemChina completed the acquisition of the remaining shares, obtaining full ownership of the company.

In 2017, ADAMA and Sanonda merged to create the first integrated Global-China Crop Protection leader, expanding its manufacturing presence in China and listing the merged entity on the Shenzhen Stock Exchange as ADAMA Ltd.

Since 2020, ADAMA is a distinct business unit within the Syngenta Group.

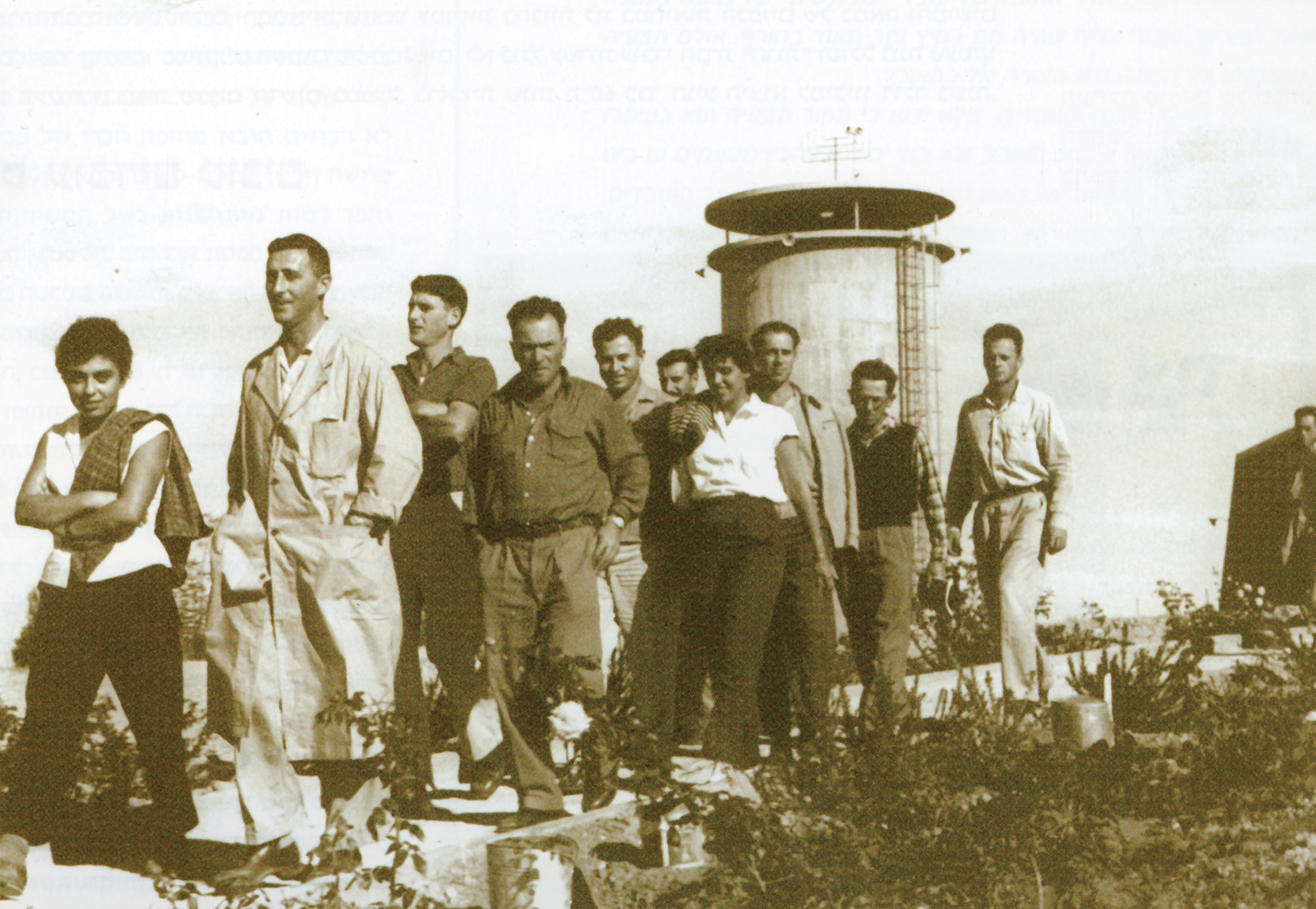
Founders of Makhteshim

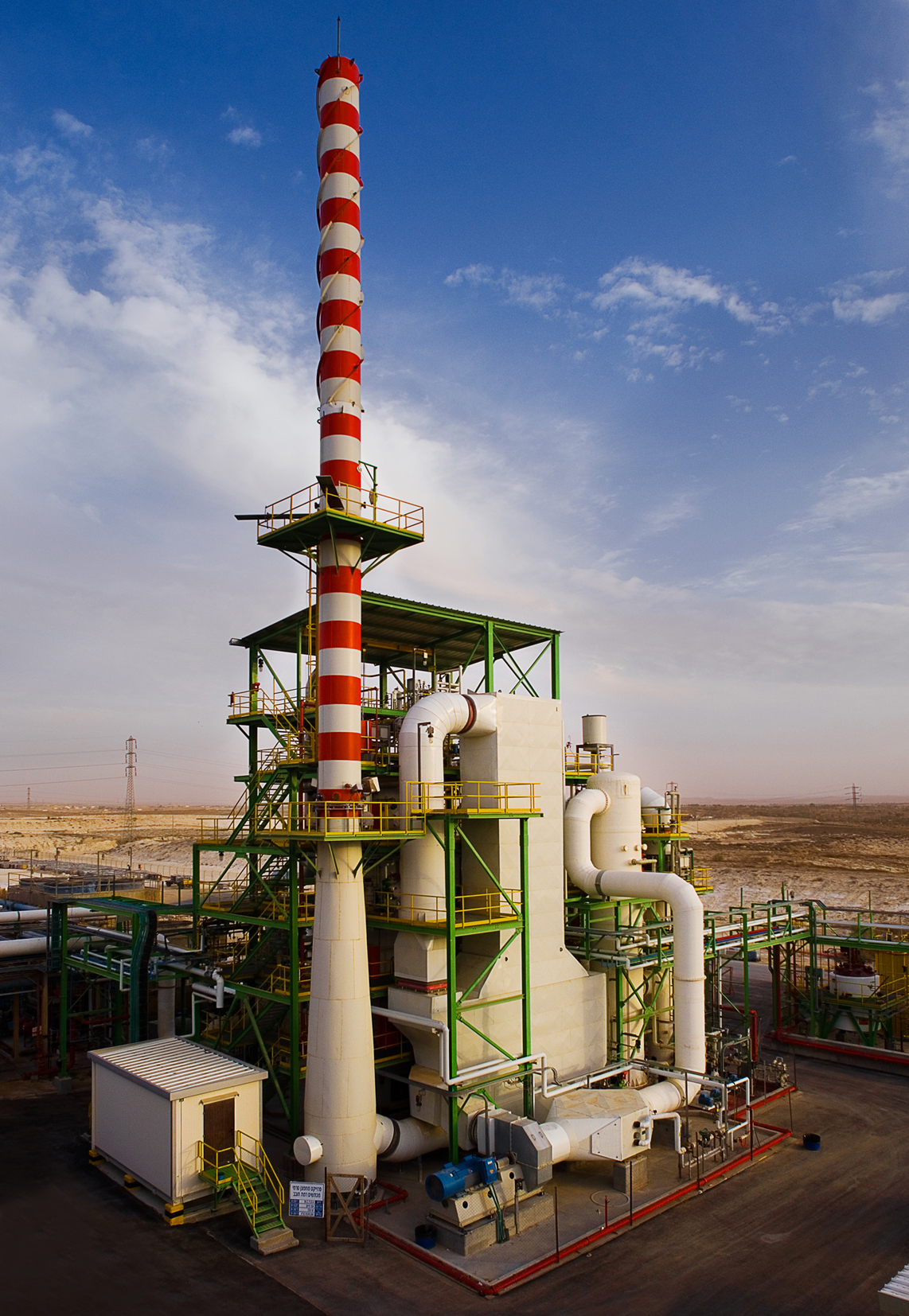
Facilities at Ne'ot Hovav

== Sales and operations ==
ADAMA operates in dozens of countries, with commercial presence in Europe, Asia, North America, South America, Africa and Australia. The company operates more than 20 manufacturing sites worldwide, including chemical synthesis facilities in Israel, China, and Brazil, as well as formulation plants across Israel, China, India, Europe, North America, and South America.

The company maintains research and development centers in Israel, China, and India, focusing on formulation technologies, product development, and regulatory support. ADAMA’s operations include active ingredient synthesis, formulation, registration, and distribution.

== Products ==
ADAMA develops, produces, and markets crop-protection products, including herbicides, insecticides, and fungicides. The company’s portfolio includes both essential off patent products as well as advanced differentiated formulations.

The company develops proprietary formulation technologies intended to enhance performance, stability, or handling characteristics of active ingredients. For example: Asorbital, designed to enhance the uptake of active ingredients in cereal crops, and Sesgama, a technology that enables higher concentrations of active ingredients in suspension formulations while aiming to improve stability and reduce packaging and transportation requirements.

In 2024, ADAMA introduced a new active ingredient under development, flumetylsulforim (Gilboa). This AI has been classified by the Fungicide Resistance Action Committee (FRAC) as having a novel mode of action for use in cereals. Products based on this active ingredient are expected to be launched in the United Kingdom in 2027 and in additional European markets thereafter.

== Financial performance ==
In 2025 financial results, the company reported revenues of US$4 billion, adjusted EBITDA of US$587 million, and adjusted net income of approximately US$28 million.

Regional sales distribution in 2025 included Europe, Africa and the Middle East (US$1,136 million), North America (US$942 million), Latin America (US$1,006 million), and Asia-Pacific (US$967 million).

== Sustainability ==
ADAMA publishes environmental, social, and governance (ESG) disclosures as part of its corporate reporting. In 2025, the company received a Bronze rating from EcoVadis, placing it in the top 23% of companies in the “Manufacture of Pesticides and Other Agrochemical Products” category. The company reported a score of 64 compared with an industry average of 58.

The company has reported initiatives related to emissions reduction, manufacturing efficiency, and responsible product stewardship across its global operations.
