= Ren Bonian =

Ren Yi (Chinese: 任頤; 1840–1896), also known as Ren Bonian, was a painter and son of a rice merchant who supplemented his income by doing portraits. He was born in Zhejiang, but after the death of his father in 1855 he lived in Shanghai. This move placed him in a more urban world that was exposed to Western thinking. In Shanghai he became a member of the Shanghai School which fused popular and traditional styles. Ren Bonian ranked with Ren Xiong, Ren Xun and Ren Yu as the "Four Rens."

He was noted for his bold brushstrokes and use of color. In his earlier career the Song dynasty painters influenced him, but later on he favored a freer style influenced by the works of Zhu Da.

== Gallery ==
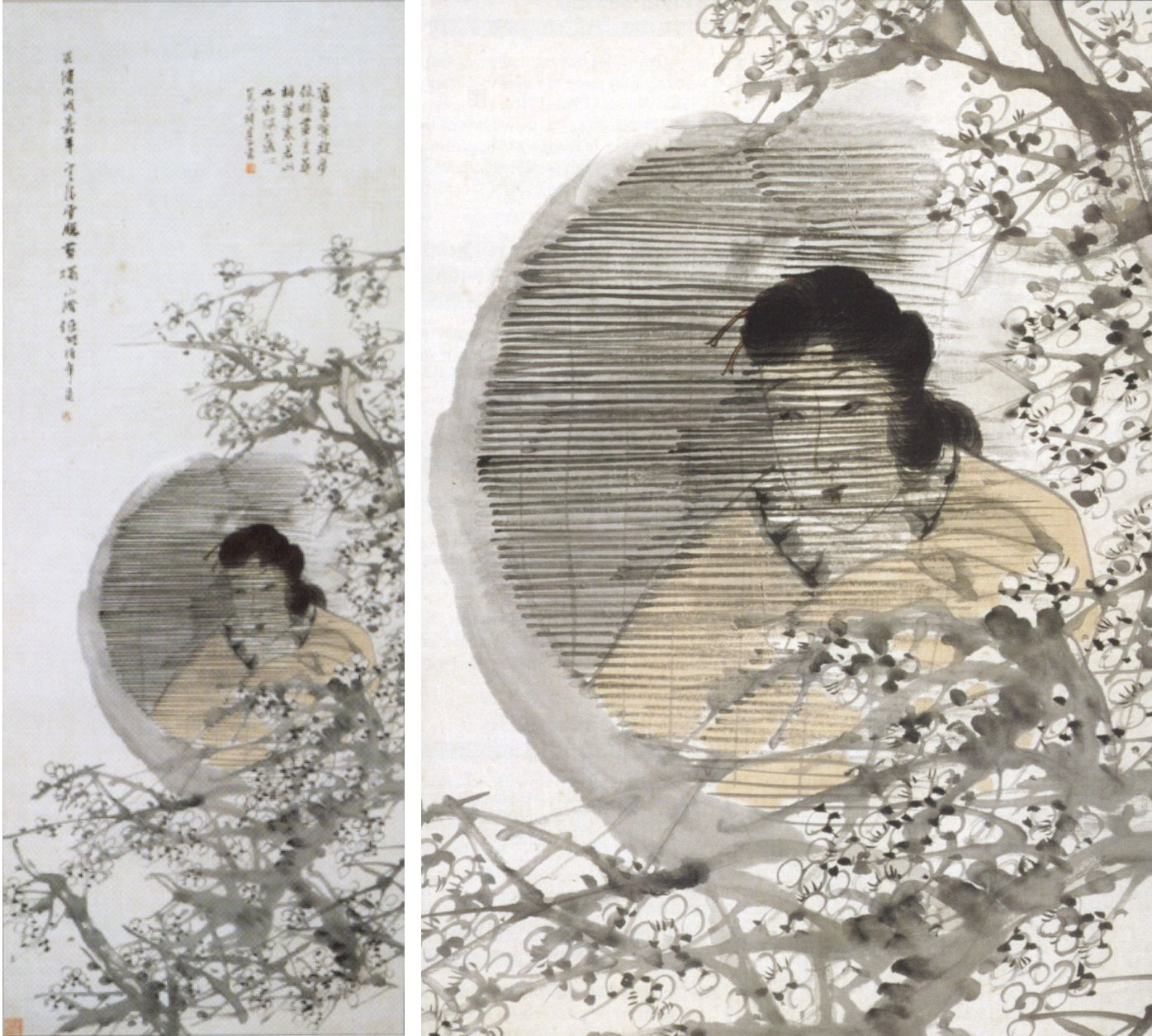
Portrait of Gao Yong's Wife by Rèn Yi, 1886, Honolulu Museum of Art

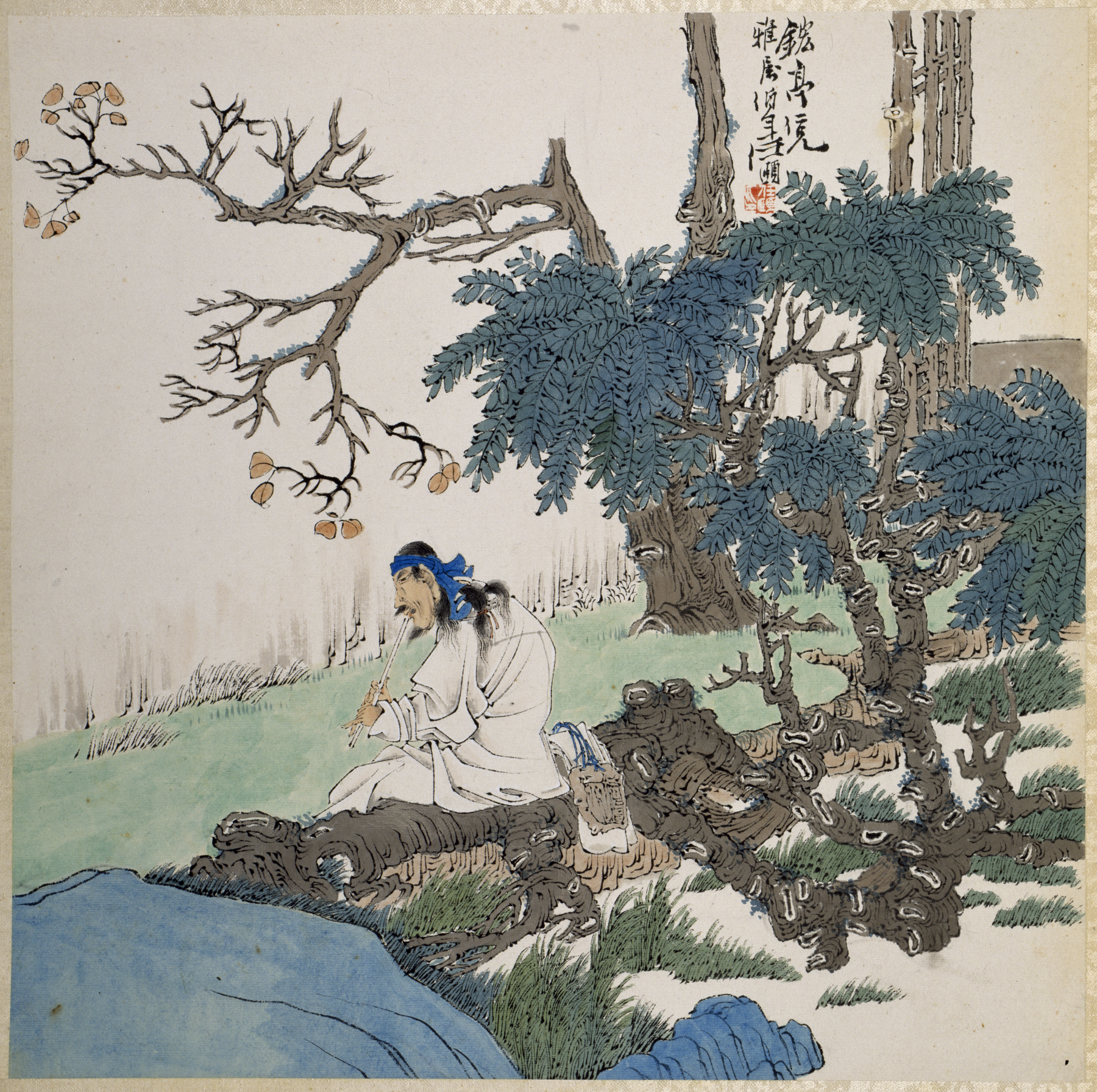
Playing the Flute, 1860–80, Walters Art Museum

== Sources ==
- Chinese Paintings in the Ashmolean Museum Oxford (132) Oxford ISBN 1-85444-132-9
