= Sanonda =

Chinese pesticide producer

- Type: Public
- Traded as: SZSE: 000553 (A share); SZSE: 200553 (B share)
- Founded: 1958; 1992 (as limited company)
- Headquarters: Jingzhou, Hubei Province, China
- Area served: China
- Key people: An Li-Ru (Chairman)
- Revenue: ▼CN¥1.855 billion (2016)
- Operating income: ▼ (CN¥120 million) (2016)
- Net income: ▼ (CN¥74 million) (2016)
- Total assets: ▲CN¥2.984 billion (2016)
- Total equity: ▼CN¥2.005 billion (2016)
Owner
Chinese Central Government (via ChemChina)	(30.75%)
Government of Qichun County	(0.70%)
- Parent: ChemChina
- Website: sanonda.cn

Hubei Sanonda Co., Ltd.
- Simplified Chinese: 湖北沙隆达股份有限公司
- Traditional Chinese: 湖北沙隆達股份有限公司
Transcriptions
Standard Mandarin
- Hanyu Pinyin: Húběi shālóngdá gǔfèn yǒuxiàn gōngsī

Sanonda
- Simplified Chinese: 沙隆达
- Traditional Chinese: 沙隆達
Transcriptions
Standard Mandarin
- Hanyu Pinyin: shālóngdá

Hubei Sanonda Co., Ltd. is a Chinese pesticide producer, based in Jingzhou, Hubei Province. As of 31 December 2016, state-owned enterprise ChemChina via Sanonda Group (A share) and Adama Agricultural Solutions (B share) owned a combined 30.75% stake. It was followed by the Government of Qichun County (0.70%). A share accounted for 61.27% share capital, comparing to 38.73% for B share (domestically traded share for foreigner in mainland China).

In 2016, a plan to acquire 100% stake of Adama Agricultural Solutions from ChemChina was announced, by issuing new shares to ChemChina and a private equity fund (Chinese: 芜湖信运汉石) that related to China Cinda. The B share held by ADAMA (which would become treasury stock) would be canceled. After the deal ChemChina would owned over 70% stake. As China Cinda was also owned by the State Council indirectly (via the Ministry of Finance). The total stake held by the Central Government of China was unknown.

== History ==
The predecessor of Hubei Sanonda Co., Ltd. was founded in 1958. In 1992 the company was re-incorporated as company limited by shares (Chinese: 股份有限公司), under the new Company Law of China as part of marketization (State Council allowed corporation to issue shares since 1986). in 1993 the shares of the company started to float on Shenzhen Stock Exchange. Shashi Government (Shashi later merged to form Jingzhou) was the major shareholder for 52.35% stake. In 1996, Sanonda Group (Chinese: 沙隆达集团, now known as Sanonda Holdings, Chinese: 沙隆达控股) was formed as an intermediate holding company for Jingzhou Government for 44.66% stake, with the Government of Qichun County acquired a minority stake from the Government of Jingzhou in 1995.

In 2005 ChemChina became the largest shareholder by acquiring 100% share of Sanonda Group, which owned 20.57% stake of Sanonda at that time.

Adama Agricultural Solutions acquired part of the B share (shares for foreigner which float in mainland China) of Sanonda in 2013 (about 10.6% of total share capital), at that time ChemChina (via wholly owned subsidiary China National Agrochemical Corporation) owned 60% Adama's stake.
