= David Garst =

American farmer (1926–2006)

David Garst (September 10, 1926 in Coon Rapids, Iowa – January 9, 2006), was a seed industry leader, farmer, and former Executive President of Garst Seed Company. He also worked in the livestock, fertilizer, and chemical businesses, and contributed to foreign agricultural development projects in Eastern Europe, Central America, and the Caribbean. Garst believed that farming in the United States is fettered by governmental and environmental regulation.

Garst was appointed by the Carter administration to the Presidential Mission on Agricultural Development in Central America and the Caribbean. The work of this committee led to the Caribbean Basin Initiative passed under President Ronald Reagan. Garst helped to develop the National Corn Growers Association that promoted open trade with Communist countries and sends aid in the form of farming technology to developing nations. In the 1990s, under the Clinton administration, Garst lead the agricultural portion of a development project in the Staritsky district of Moscow. The project included the development of a dairy industry, egg and broiler houses, hog farms, packing plants, roads, and marketing systems. Garst was a leader in Howard Dean's campaign in Iowa and was an active voice in the opposition to the 2003 invasion of Iraq.

Garst married Georganne (Jo) Orenstein (October 9, 1928 – March 1, 1984) on July 12, 1949, and Marilyn Ann Shinn on March 23, 1985 (divorced 1996). He married Marilyn Reineke in May 2005. He was the son of agriculturalist Roswell Garst and Elizabeth Henak.

He is credited as bringing forth innovations that helped the corn market.
