= Golden Harvest Seeds =

American provider of corn and soybean seed

Golden Harvest Seeds, Inc.
- Type: Agriculture/Subsidiary
- Industry: Agriculture
- Founded: Dallas, Texas (1973)
- Headquarters: Waterloo, Nebraska, United States
- Products: Corn and soybean seeds
- Parent: Syngenta
- Website: goldenharvestseeds.com

1973 logo

Golden Harvest is a U.S.-based brand wholly owned by Syngenta. Syngenta markets hybrid corn seeds and soybean seeds for agriculture under the brand.

== History ==
Golden Harvest Seeds, Inc. was founded April 23, 1973 when seven companies in the 13-member Funk G Hybrids conglomerate decided to end their partnership with the latter. Founding Golden Harvest Seeds members included Akin Seed, Columbiana Seed, Garwood Seed, Golden Seed, J.C. Robinson Seeds, Sommer Bros. Seed, and Thorp Seed. Akin Seed left the partnership early, while Columbiana Seed was purchased by SeedTec following bankruptcy; the remaining five members continued as Golden Harvest until it ceased to exist as an independent entity.

In 2001, J.C. Robinson Seeds, the largest of the five remaining members, was sued by the smaller four. The lawsuit was prompted by J.C. Robinson Seeds' expressed interest in exiting the Golden Harvest association. While the lawsuit was quickly dismissed in favor of J.C. Robinson, J.C. Robinson nevertheless did not leave the relationship.

In 2003, J.C. Robinson Seeds purchased a controlling interest in the Dutch company Zelder, adding its corn-related activities to the Golden Harvest group.

In 2004, Golden Harvest and Garst were acquired by Syngenta. Golden Harvest and Garst ceased to exist as independent legal entities at the end of 2012, but Syngenta continues to market many of both companies' hybrid corn seed products under the Golden Harvest brand name.
