= Roswell and Elizabeth Garst Farmstead Historic District =

Historic district in Iowa, United States

- Garst Farmstead Historic District
- U.S. National Register of Historic Places
- Location within Iowa
- Location: Orange Township, Guthrie County, at 1390 Highway 141, Coon Rapids, Iowa postal address
- Coordinates: 41°51′32″N 94°40′15″W
- Area: 53.3 acres (216,000 m^{2})
- NRHP reference No.: 09000610
- Added to NRHP: August 12, 2009

The Roswell and Elizabeth Garst Farmstead Historic District is a farm in Guthrie County, Iowa, United States, near the city of Coon Rapids. It is significant as the home of farmer and hybrid corn populizer Roswell Garst.

== History ==
During the 1930s and 1940s, Garst played an active role in the conversion of old-style family farms to modern agribusiness. He was a key marketer of hybrid seed corn, which greatly increased corn yields per acre. Further, he espoused the use of nitrogen and other chemical fertilizers to renew soil so that fields need not be left fallow in order for the soil to replenish, allowing farmers to grow more acres of corn. Additionally, he embraced the use of cellulose from corncobs left after processing seed corn as cattle feed.

The farm is also famous as site of a visit on September 23, 1959, by Soviet premier Nikita Khrushchev. The visit was not their first meeting, and it was by Khrushchev's request. Garst's farm had been visited by Soviet officials first in 1955, as an unofficial extra when they were on an organized tour of smaller farms. The Garst farm, with its use of hybrid corn and other agricultural innovations, was the only large size farm at all comparable to the scale of Soviet collective farms that the official was able to visit, and that was only by getting away from the official tour. Subsequently, Garst visited the Soviet Union to sell hybrid corn there and spread information about modern American farming methods. He met Khrushchev, and they found they had much in common. Three years later, a group of Soviet officials were sent to spend three months at the farm, participating in all of its activities. When Khrushchev visited America in 1959, he was adamant that his visit include a trip to Garst's farm in Iowa.

The comparison between a small Iowa farm community and a similar community in the Soviet Union must have been very striking indeed.

— Ambassador Llewellyn Thompson

After the conclusion of the visit, Llewellyn Thompson, then the U.S. ambassador to the Soviet Union, stated that the visit to the Garst farm was one of the most significant parts of Khrushchev's journey to the United States. This visit, combined with plummeting yields from Soviet agriculture, helped to lead Khrushchev to attempt an overhaul of the Soviet agricultural system.

The main building is a 1 1/2-story farmhouse. It includes 11 other contributing buildings, 3 contributing structures and one contributing site.

The farm was added to the National Register of Historic Places on August 12, 2009 and the listing was announced as the featured listing in the National Park Service's weekly list of August 21, 2009. Currently the main house of the Roswell and Elizabeth Garst Farmstead Historic District is the office for the Whiterock Conservancy.

The site is located at 1390 Highway 141 in the northwestern corner of Guthrie County.
