= ChemChina =

Chinese state-owned chemical company

China National Chemical Corporation
- Trade name: ChemChina
- Formerly: Bluestar (1984–2004)
- Type: State-owned enterprise
- Industry: Chemicals
- Founded: 1984; 42 years ago
- Founder: Ren Jianxin
- Headquarters: Haidian District, Beijing, China
- Key people: Ning Gaoning (Chairman)
- Revenue: ▲CN¥300.127 billion (2016)
- Operating income: ▲CN¥2.803 billion (2016)
- Net income: ▲CN¥119 million (2016)
- Total assets: ▲CN¥377.642 billion (2016)
- Total equity: ▼CN¥24.061 billion (2016)
- Parent: Sinochem Holdings
- Subsidiaries: ADAMA (100%); Pirelli (45.5%); Syngenta (98.0%); Sanonda (30.75%)

Chinese name
- Simplified Chinese: 中国化工集团公司
- Traditional Chinese: 中國化工集團公司
Transcriptions
Standard Mandarin
- Hanyu Pinyin: Zhōngguó Huàgōng Jítuán Gōngsī
- Website: www.chemchina.com
- Footnotes in a consolidated basis

China National Chemical Corporation, doing business as ChemChina, is a Chinese state-owned chemical company in the product segments of agrochemicals, rubber products, chemical materials and specialty chemicals, industrial equipment, and petrochemical processing for the civilian and military sectors. As of 2020, it is ranked 164th among the Fortune Global 500 companies.

== History ==
=== Bluestar Company ===
ChemChina began as a small solvents factory called Bluestar Company (Chinese: 蓝星公司), founded by Ren Jianxin in 1984 with a 10,000-yuan loan. Ren created the ChemChina empire by taking control of over 100 troubled state-owned chemical factories across China, with the government retaining ownership. Meanwhile, he avoided laying off excess workers by shifting them to the company's Malan Noodle restaurant chain. He brought in consultants to professionalize the company's management, and it has become one of China's most dynamic state enterprises.

=== State company ===
In May 2004, after the State Council of the People's Republic of China approved a merger of companies formerly under the Ministry of Chemical Industry as the China National Chemical Corporation (ChemChina), Ren Jianxin became its CEO; in December 2014 he became the chairman of the board of directors.

Within ChemChina's agrochemicals business is a large portfolio of companies including Sanonda Holdings, Cangzhou Dahua, Shandong Dacheng, Jiangsu Anpon, Anhui Petrochemicals, and Huaihe Chemicals. It added Israel-based Makhteshim Agan (renamed to Adama Agricultural Solutions) in 2011 to the division in a 2.4 billion US dollars acquisition of a 60% stake in the company, the largest manufacturer of generic pesticides.

The chemical materials and speciality chemicals group made overseas acquisitions with two deals in 2006, both to acquire French companies. The first one was the Adisseo Group, a global animal nutrition feed firm that specialized in producing methionine, vitamins and biological enzymes. At the time of the purchase, Adisseo had worldwide market share of 30% in methionine. The other company was the organic silicon and sulphide business of Rhodia. With this acquisition the company became the third largest producer in the world of organic silicon.

The petrochemical processing division has been operating refineries including small ones known as teapot plants, giving it an oil processing capacity of about 25 million tonnes (25,000,000 long tons; 28,000,000 short tons) a year or about 500,000 barrels per day. After regulations liberalized the import of crude and fuel products in China, the company opened a trading office in Singapore in October 2013.

In March 2015, it was announced that Pirelli shareholders had accepted a €7.1 billion bid from ChemChina for the world's fifth-largest tyre maker.

=== Syngenta acquisition ===
In February 2016, ChemChina agreed to a $43 billion bid for Swiss seeds and pesticides group Syngenta, the largest ever foreign purchase by a Chinese firm. The deal was awaiting approval by the Committee on Foreign Investment in the United States (CFIUS) and European government panels, citing food safety and security concerns. In June 2016, both companies refiled the transaction for CFIUS approval, forcing them to restart the application process. In August 2016, the CFIUS cleared the deal, while the merger still awaited the regulatory review and concessions made towards the European Commission, in particular with regard to divesting itself from agrochemical subsidiary Adama Agricultural Solutions (which was planned to sell to ChemChina's associated company Sanonda).

The Australian Competition & Consumer Commission cleared the deal in December 2016, but the buy-out was again delayed due to European antitrust investigations. In April 2017, the European Commissioner for Competition and the U.S. Federal Trade Commission both approved the merger, requiring ChemChina to divest from pesticide production of paraquat, abamectin and chlorothalonil. The European Commission also addressed competition concerns with regard to plant growth regulators and reiterated the expected commitments for divestment from ADAMA-related products. As of May 26, 2017, ChemChina's plan to purchase Syngenta for $44 billion was nearing completion, with ChemChina amassing "huge bridge loans" to pay Syngenta stockholders. The deal was completed that same month with 82.2 percent of Syngenta shares and depository receipts offered.

=== Sinochem merger ===
In May 2017, Reuters, reported that discussion had begun regarding the merging and consolidation of ChemChina and state-owned Sinochem, overtaking industry leaders such as BASF, in a deal worth around $120 billion. ChemChina merged with Sinochem Group to form Sinochem Holdings Corporation Ltd in 2021. This company also belongs to the Chinese state.

=== U.S. sanctions ===
In August 2020, the United States Department of Defense published the names of companies operating directly or indirectly in the United States with ties to the People's Liberation Army. ChemChina was included on the list. In November 2020, Donald Trump issued an executive order prohibiting any American company or individual from owning shares in companies that the United States Department of Defense has listed as having links to the People's Liberation Army, which included ChemChina.

In October 2022, the United States Department of Defense added ChemChina to a list of "Chinese military companies" operating in the U.S.

== Subsidiaries ==
- China National Agrochemical Corporation (100%)
  - Sanonda Holdings (100%)
    - Sanonda (expected 70%)
      - Adama Agricultural Solutions (100%)
