= Syngenta =

Global provider of agricultural science and technology

Syngenta AG

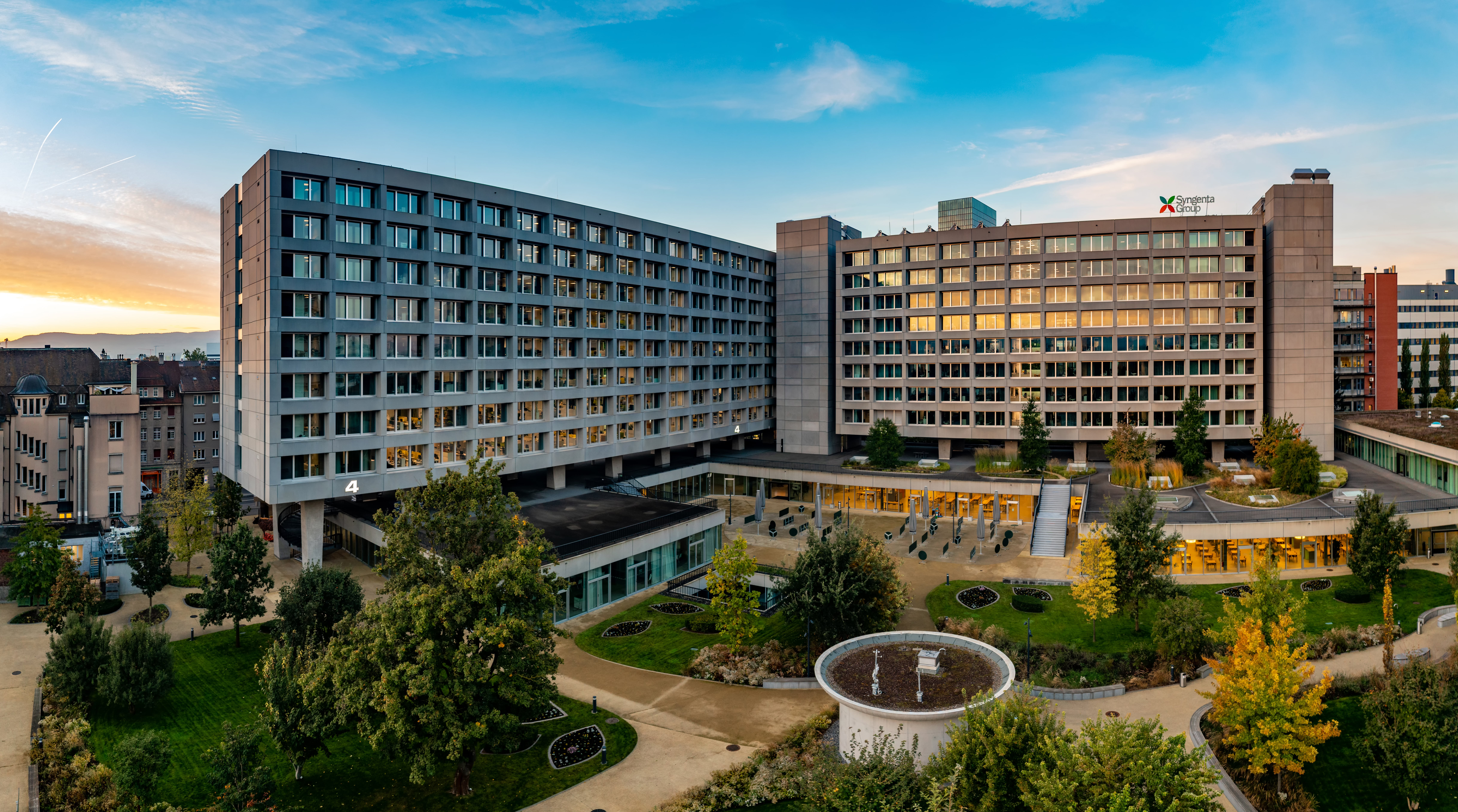
- Headquarters, Basel, Switzerland
- Type: State-owned
- Industry: Agrobusiness, chemicals
- Founded: 13 November 2000; 26 years ago
- Headquarters: Basel, Switzerland
- Area served: Worldwide
- Key people: Hengde Qin (CEO); Steven Hawkins (President Syngenta Crop Protection)
- Products: Crops (fungicides, herbicides, insecticides); field and vegetable seeds; flowers; nutrients; digital services (maps, weather data)
- Revenue: ▲US$16.999 billion (2025)
- Net income: ▼US$-152 million (2025)
- Owner: Sinochem
- Divisions: Syngenta Crop Protection; Syngenta Seeds
- Website: www.syngenta.com

Syngenta AG is a global agricultural technology company headquartered in Basel, Switzerland. It primarily covers crop protection and seeds for farmers. Syngenta is part of the Syngenta Group, entirely owned by Sinochem, a Chinese state-owned enterprise.

Syngenta was founded in 2000 by the merger of the agrichemical businesses of Novartis and AstraZeneca, and acquired by China National Chemical Corporation (ChemChina) in 2017. In 2020, the Syngenta Group was formed, bringing together Syngenta (Syngenta Crop Protection and Syngenta Seeds), Adama, and the agricultural business of Sinochem, now called Syngenta Group China, under a single entity.

Syngenta's primary products include pesticides such as selective herbicides, fungicides, insecticides, as well as corn, soya, and biofuel.

== History ==
Based in Basel, Switzerland, Syngenta was formed on 13 November 2000 by the merger of Novartis Agribusiness and AstraZeneca Agrochemicals.

In 2004, Syngenta Seeds purchased Garst, the North American corn and soybean business of Advanta, as well as Golden Harvest Seeds.

As of 2014, Syngenta's main competitors were Monsanto Company, BASF, Dow AgroSciences, Bayer CropScience and DuPont Pioneer.

In 2014, Monsanto sought to acquire Syngenta for a reported $40 billion, but Syngenta rejected the offer. Since April 2015, Monsanto and Syngenta had been working with their investment banks Morgan Stanley and Goldman Sachs respectively on a deal. The U.S. Treasury tried to stop the deal for tax inversion. Syngenta's Board of Directors rejected an even better offer by Monsanto during August 2015, and Monsanto withdrew from the negotiations on 26 August.

In February 2016, ChemChina, a Chinese state-owned enterprise, offered to purchase Syngenta for $43 billion (480 Swiss francs per share), a deal which the company "unanimously recommended to shareholders". In April 2017, the Federal Trade Commission, the Committee on Foreign Investment in the United States, and the European Commissioner for Competition approved of the acquisition. This was the largest takeover by a Chinese company to date, and it caused criticism. To secure approval, ChemChina agreed to divest from pesticide production of paraquat, abamectin, and chlorothalonil. The transaction closed on 26 June 2017.

In the following years, several acquisitions were made to expand the business. In November 2017, Syngenta agreed to purchase Nidera from Cofco International. In March 2018, Syngenta announced plans to acquire Strider, a Brazilian agtech company. In July, Syngenta acquired Floranova, a flower and vegetable seeds breeder based in the UK. In September 2019, the company acquired all the assets of The Cropio Group, an agri-technology company.

In June 2020, ChemChina transferred its entire agricultural business to the Syngenta Group, which now also includes Adama and the agricultural activities of Sinochem in addition to Syngenta. The Syngenta Group is a Chinese company with its management headquarters in Basel, Switzerland.

At the end of 2020, Syngenta announced the acquisition of Valagro, a manufacturer of biological crop protection products headquartered in Atessa, Italy. The company continues to operate as an independent brand.

=== Acquisition history (selection) ===
The following is an illustration of the company's mergers, acquisitions, spin-offs and historical predecessors:

- Syngenta
  - - - - - - - - - - - - Syngenta (Merged 2000)
                          - Novartis Agribusiness
                          - Zeneca Agrochemicals
                        - - Garst Seed Company
                            (Acq 2004)
                          - Golden Harvest Seeds
                            (Acq 2004)
                      - - Circle One Global, Inc
                          (Acq 2009)
                    - - Synergene Seed & Technology, Inc
                        (Acq 2009)
                  - - Pybas Vegetable Seed Co., Inc
                      (Acq 2009)
                - - Maribo Seed(Acq 2010)
              - - Pasteuria Bioscience, Inc
                  (Acq 2012)
            - - Devgen NV
                (Acq 2012)
          - - Sunfield Seeds
              (Acq 2012)
        - - MRI Seed Zambia Ltd
            (Acq 2013)
      - - MRI Agro Ltd
          (Acq 2013)
    - - Società Produttori Sementi
        (Acq 2014)
  - - Lantmännen
      (Winter wheat & oilseed rape operations, Acq 2014)

== Corporate structure ==
Syngenta (Syngenta AG), consists of US-headquartered Syngenta Seeds and Swiss-headquartered Syngenta Crop Protection businesses. Syngenta AG, Israeli off-patent crop protection company ADAMA, and Syngenta Group China make up Syngenta Group. The Group was formed in June 2020. While the Group is registered in Shanghai, China, its administrative headquarters and central offices are located in Basel, Switzerland. Syngenta Group is owned by Chinese-owned Sinochem, through its fully owned subsidiary, ChemChina. Li Fanrong is the chairman of Syngenta Group. In January 2024, Jeff Rowe took over as CEO of the Syngenta Group, succeeding Erik Fyrwald, who was appointed CEO of Syngenta AG in June 2016. In August 2026, Hengde Qin took over as CEO, succeeding Jeff Rowe.

== Other activities ==
=== Lobbying ===
Syngenta is in the transparency register of the European Union as a registered lobbyist. For 2017, it declared a €1.5 to €1.75 million expenditure of lobbying in European institutions. Alongside the European Landowners' Organization, Syngenta is the founding partner of the Forum for the Future of Agriculture, a platform aimed at bridging the conversation between different stakeholders across the food system. Relevant supporting partners of the Forum include Nestlé, PepsiCo and Anglo American.

Syngenta formed a political action committee (PAC) to process its U.S. lobbying, called Syngenta Corporation Employee PAC, or SyngentaPAC. The company stated it is an employee-funded organization for supporting U.S. lawmakers.

Syngenta's contributions to U.S. federal candidates, parties, and outside groups totaled $140,822 during the 2018 election cycle, ranking it 20th on the list of companies in its sector. Its lobbying expenditures in the U.S. during 2018 were $770,000, ranking it 7th in its sector. The company spent $1 million in U.S. federal lobbying in 2023.

== Litigation ==
In 2001, the United States Patent and Trademark Office ruled in favor of Syngenta which had filed a suit against Bayer for patent infringement on a class of neonicotinoid insecticides. The following year Syngenta filed suits against Monsanto and other companies claiming infringement of its U.S. biotechnology patents covering genetically modified corn and cotton. In 2004, it again filed a suit against Monsanto, claiming antitrust violations related to the U.S. biotech corn seed market, and Monsanto countersued. Monsanto and Syngenta settled all litigation in 2008.

Syngenta was the defendant in a class action lawsuit by the city of Greenville, Illinois concerning the adverse effects of atrazine on human water supplies. The suit was settled for $105 million in May 2012. A similar case involving six states has been in federal court since 2010.

In the U.S., Syngenta is facing lawsuits from farmers and shipping companies regarding Viptera genetically modified corn. The plaintiffs in nearly 30 states contend that Syngenta's introduction of Viptera drove down U.S. grain market prices, leading to financial harm, and that Syngenta acted irresponsibly by doing too little to enable shipping companies to export the grain to approved ports. Before Viptera's 2010 introduction Syngenta secured all U.S. and NCGA-recommended export approvals, but none from China. China had imported little to no U.S. grain prior to 2010, and at the time was not considered a major partner, which changed in 2010, when it dramatically increased U.S. grain imports. For three years, China imported U.S. Viptera grain without formal approval. In November 2013, Chinese officials destroyed a U.S. grain shipment containing Viptera grain and began rejecting all U.S. shipments with the GM grain. The same year, U.S. corn market prices dropped $4 per bushel, causing over $2.9 billion in losses, with just over half of that loss occurring prior to China's November rejection. China later approved the GM corn in 2014, but U.S. corn grain market prices have since not rebounded. Syngenta lost the first lawsuit to reach trial in Kansas on 23 June 2017, and was ordered to pay the farmers $217 million. However, Syngenta has stated it would appeal the verdict.

In 2022, the Federal Trade Commission announced that it is initiating litigation against Syngenta, challenging certain US-based discount programs extended to their respective customers. In January 2024, a federal judge ruled that both Corteva and Syngenta must face the FTC lawsuit. In December 2025, the Trump Administration and 12 US states asked a Federal Judge to expedite the process so the trial may proceed.

=== Paraquat and Parkinson's disease ===
In June 2021, Syngenta paid $187.5 million to settle an unknown number of cases in Illinois and California, implicating the company's Paraquat herbicide as a cause of Parkinson's disease.

In 2024, more than 5,000 Americans have active lawsuits against Syngenta, alleging ties between use of the paraquat herbicide product, Gramoxone, and the onset of Parkinson's disease. Syngenta denies any causal link between its product and Parkinson's disease. Syngenta took steps in April 2025 to resolve the majority of approximately 5,800 lawsuits pending in multidistrict litigation in federal court in Illinois. In addition, there were approximately 450 lawsuits pending in California state court and many more in state courts across the country.

Internal documents from Syngenta, unsealed as part of court proceedings, showed a memo from the company's head of regulatory sciences, Lewis Smith, warning about the scientific consensus that paraquat was linked to Parkinson's disease.

In January 2026, Syngenta settled a lawsuit from a retired landscaper who had developed Parkinson's disease after decades of using Paraquat. The case was just about to go to trial in Philadelphia, Pennsylvania.

== Controversies ==
In 2007, Syngenta came under scrutiny by the U.S. Securities and Exchange Commission. This was due to third-party sales of products in countries such as Iran, Cuba, North Korea, Sudan, and Syria.

In the past, Syngenta's crop protection products have also been the subject of repeated criticism. The company was accused of including the sale of highly toxic pesticides in its business model. In 2012, the company was therefore nominated for the "Public Eye Award", which denounces companies with questionable human rights practices. In 2023, the Arkansas attorney general Tim Griffin ordered Syngenta to sell land in the state under a prohibition against land sales to entities with "a connection to a country subject to the federal International Traffic in Arms Regulations."

=== Brazil ===
On 21 October 2007, a Brazilian peasant organization, the Landless Workers' Movement, led a group of landless farmers in an invasion of one of the company's seed research farms, in protest against genetically-engineered ("genetically modified") vegetables and in hopes of obtaining land for landless families to cultivate. After the invasion had begun, a team from NF Security arrived in a minibus and a fight with gunfire ensued. A trespasser and a security guard were killed, and some trespassers and other security guards were wounded.

The Brazilian police investigation, which concluded in November 2007, blamed the confrontation and death of the trespasser on nine employees and the owner of NF Security; the leader of MST was blamed for trespassing. The inquiry found that the invader was fatally shot in the abdomen and in the leg. The security guard was shot in the head. Eight others were injured, five of them invaders.

The Civil Court of Cascavel granted an order for the repossession of the site on 20 December 2007 and on 12 June 2008, the remaining MST members left the Santa Teresa site they had been occupying. On 14 October 2008, Syngenta donated the 123-hectare station to the Agronomy Institute of Paraná (IAPAR) for research into biodiversity, recovery of degraded areas and agriculture production systems, as well as environmental education programs.

In November 2015, Judge Pedro Ivo Moreiro, of the 1st Civil Court of Cascavel, ruled that Syngenta must pay compensation to the family of Valmir Mota de Oliveira ("Keno"), who was killed in the attack, and to Isabel Nascimento dos Santos who was injured. In his sentence the judge stated that "to refer to what happened as a confrontation is to close one's eyes to reality, since […] there is no doubt that, in truth, it was a massacre disguised as repossession of property". The version of events put forward by Syngenta was rejected by the Court. In May 2010, Syngenta was condemned by the IV Permanent People's Tribunal for human rights violations in Brazil.

=== Tyrone Hayes ===
There has been a long-running conflict between Syngenta and University of California at Berkeley biologist Tyrone Hayes.

In 2010, Syngenta forwarded an ethics complaint to the University of California Berkeley, complaining that Hayes had been sending harassing e-mails to Syngenta scientists. Legal counsel from the university responded that Hayes had acknowledged sending letters having "unprofessional and offensive" content, and that he had agreed not to use similar language in future communications.

According to an article in the 10 February 2014, issue of The New Yorker, Syngenta's public-relations team took steps to discredit Hayes, whose research is purported to suggest that the Syngenta-produced chemical atrazine was responsible for abnormal development of reproductive organs in frogs. The article states that the company paid third-party critics to write articles discrediting Hayes's work, planned to have his wife investigated, and planted hostile audience members at scientific talks given by Hayes.

During a 21 February 2014, interview conducted on Democracy Now, Hayes reiterated the claims. After the interview aired, Syngenta denied targeting Hayes or making any threats, calling those statements "uncorroborated and intentionally damaging" and demanding a retraction and public apology from Hayes and Democracy Now.

=== Response to Russian invasion of Ukraine ===
Syngenta continues to operate in Russia despite the ongoing invasion of Ukraine and international sanctions imposed on the Russian economy. The company remains a major player in the Russian agricultural sector, supplying pesticides and seeds to local farmers. It has been criticized for maintaining business-as-usual in the country, earning an "F" grade in a ranking of companies that have failed to exit or reduce their activities in Russia. It was condemned for prioritizing profits over ethics. Ukrainian President Volodymyr Zelenskyy has denounced companies that continue operating in Russia, stating that the Russian market is "flooded with blood." Syngenta has not only remained in Russia but has also announced price increases on its products, raising questions about whether it is exploiting the situation for financial gain. Critics argue that its continued operations strengthen Russia's agricultural industry, indirectly supporting the country’s war efforts. However, Syngenta also has maintained business as usual in Ukraine, taking similar or the same actions there.
