= Ren Jianxin (businessman) =

Chinese entrepreneur (born 1958)

- 任建新
- Born: January 1958 (age 68); Lanzhou, Gansu, China
- Education: Mechanical Engineering; Business Administration
- Alma mater: Open University of China (BEng.); Lanzhou University (M.B.A.)
- Occupation: Businessman
- Known for: Founder of ChemChina
- Political party: Chinese Communist Party; Communist Youth League
Board member of
ChemChina	(Chairman)
Pirelli	(Chairman)

Ren Jianxin (Chinese: 任建新; pinyin: Rén Jiànxīn; born January 1958) is a Chinese businessman who is the founding president of the state-owned China National Chemical Corporation (ChemChina), the 265th largest company of the Fortune Global 500. He founded Bluestar, a small solvents factory, in 1984, and created ChemChina by taking control of more than 100 troubled factories from the government, which retains ownership.

== Early life and education ==
Ren Jianxin was born January 1958 in Lanzhou, Gansu Province, of Hebei ancestry. During the Cultural Revolution, he worked as a sent-down youth in Dunhuang from 1974 to 1975. From 1975 to 1984 worked at Lanzhou Chemical Machinery Research Institute. He obtained a bachelor's degree in mechanical engineering from China Central Radio and TV University (now Open University of China). In 1994, he earned a master's degree in business administration from the department of economics at Lanzhou University.

== Career ==
In 1984, Ren used a loan of RMB ¥10,000 to start Bluestar Company (蓝星公司), an industrial solvents factory, together with seven young employees. It later became China National Bluestar (Group) Company, a joint venture with the Blackstone Group.

Starting in 1996, Ren created the ChemChina empire by taking control of more than 100 troubled chemical factories all over China, which remained government-owned. His management style was to keep lay-offs at a minimum by shifting workers to the company's Malan Noodle restaurant chain, and to modernize by bringing in outside consultants. In May 2004, after the State Council of China approved a merger of companies formerly under the Ministry of Chemical Industry as the China National Chemical Corporation (ChemChina), Ren Jianxin became its General Manager, as well as Deputy Secretary of the Committee of the [Communist] Party in the company (became the Secretary since 2010). Since December 2014 he has been promoted to the chairman of the board of directors, on top of his position as the highest ranking Communist Party member of the firm.

Ren is chairman of what The Economist has described as the "most dynamic globaliser among China's state enterprises". ChemChina bought the Italian tire manufacturer Pirelli in 2015 for $7.7 billion, and the German machinery maker Krauss-Maffei for $1 billion, the biggest acquisition by a mainland Chinese company in Italy and Germany, respectively. As of 2015, ChemChina is ranked 265th among the Fortune Global 500 companies.

== Downfall ==
On 12 May 2024, Ren was put under investigation for alleged "serious violations of discipline and laws" by the Central Commission for Discipline Inspection (CCDI), the party's internal disciplinary body, and the National Supervisory Commission, the highest anti-corruption agency of China.

== Awards ==
Ren is listed in China's "Top 10 M & A Figures", "The Most Famous Entrepreneurs" and “CCTV Annual Economic Figures”. He was awarded the National Order of Merit (France) as chevalier (knight).

Business positions
Preceded by ?	Chairman of ChemChina; 2014–2018	Succeeded by Ning Gaoning
