= Coon Rapids, Iowa =

- City
- Location of Coon Rapids, Iowa
- Coordinates: 41°52′40″N 94°40′43″W
- Country: United States
- State: Iowa
- Counties: Carroll, Guthrie
- Incorporated: November 2, 1882

Area
  - Total: 1.78 sq mi (4.62 km^{2})
  - Land: 1.78 sq mi (4.62 km^{2})
  - Water: 0 sq mi (0.00 km^{2})
- Elevation: 1,194 ft (364 m)

Population (2020)
  - Total: 1,300
  - Density: 729.1/sq mi (281.52/km^{2})
- Time zone: UTC-6 (Central (CST))
  - Summer (DST): UTC-5 (CDT)
- ZIP code: 50058
- Area code: 712
- FIPS code: 19-16050
- GNIS feature ID: 2393629
- Website: www.coonrapidsiowa.com

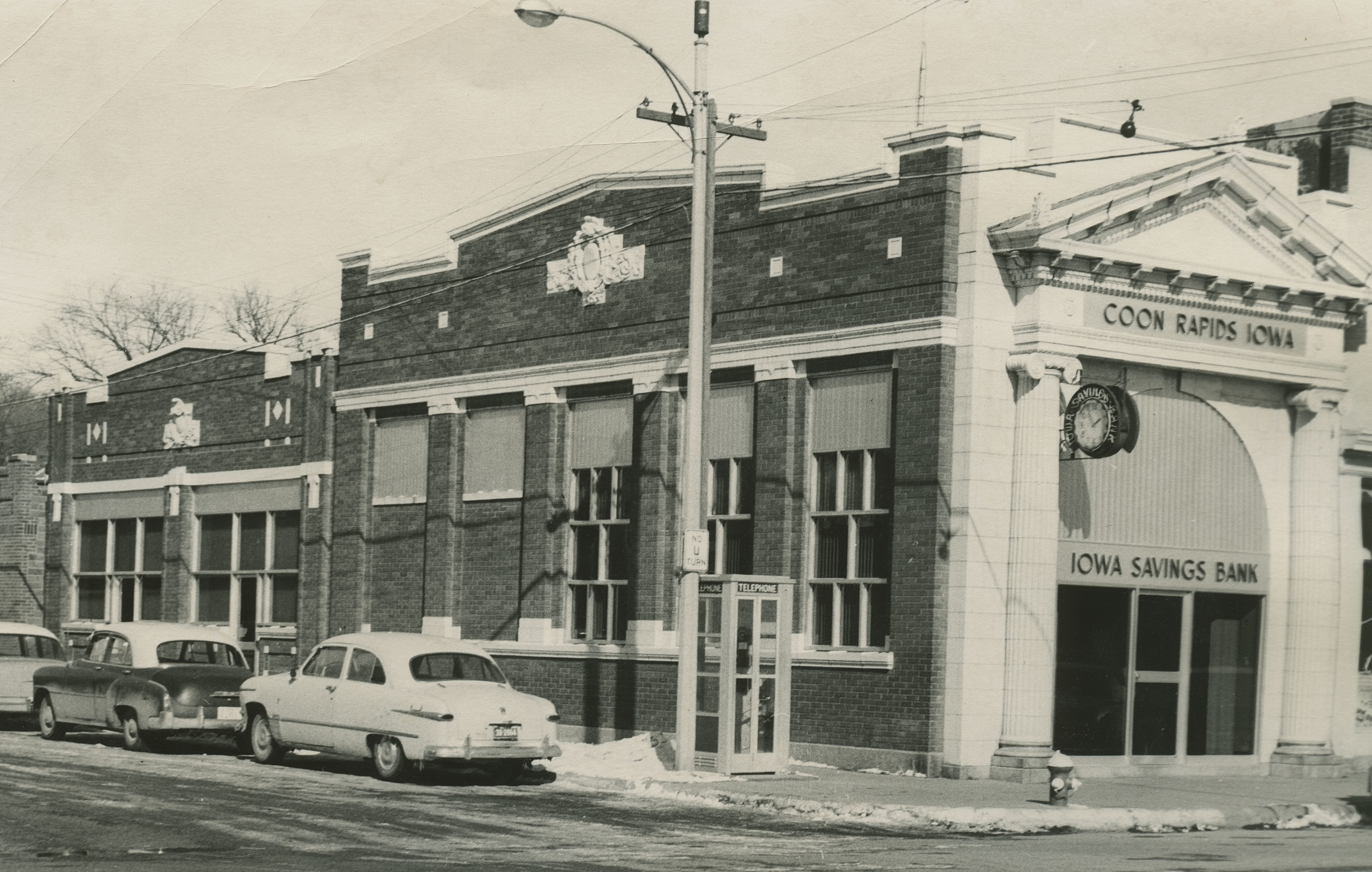
Main Street, Coon Rapids, Iowa, 1959

Coon Rapids is a city in Carroll and Guthrie counties in the U.S. state of Iowa. The population was 1,300 at the 2020 census, which is a decrease of 5 from the 2000 census. The small portion of Coon Rapids that lies in Guthrie County is part of the Des Moines–West Des Moines Metropolitan Statistical Area.

== History ==
Crocket Ribble and Jacob Cretsinger, residents of Carrollton (the county seat of Carroll County at the time), decided to try their hand in real estate. They purchased land along the Middle Raccoon River, built a saw and grist mill and went into business in 1864. Between the impact of the Civil War and later national panics, frontier settlement slowed down. However, the partners were able to establish a post office, named Coon Rapids; it soon became a stop for stagecoach service to Sioux City. Returning civil war veterans, William Minnich and his brother-in-law, Michael Shettler, saw potential in the hamlet. After purchasing land, they submitted a plat for the village of Coon Rapids and built what would become a store-hotel and home for the Shettler family. Minnich maintained his farm in adjoining Guthrie County. Between 1870 and 1880, the hamlet grew as former farmers became merchants and tradesmen and newcomers came to the area. In addition to the Mill, the town had several general stores offering an array of goods, a hardware store, implement dealer and the all-important real estate agent.

When the Chicago, St Paul and Milwaukee started to build a rail line about a half mile southwest of the hamlet, they established a rough and tumble camp for their workers, many of whom were accompanied by their families. The railroad project provided jobs and good money for local boys and newcomers, from which an economic boom began. Between 1880 and 1886, merchants in the village of Coon Rapids moved their buildings into what the railroad had platted as a town. Main street slowly became lined with business houses and homes and the area between the old and new towns slowly was transformed into a residential area. The town nearly doubled in population and the new commercial center by the railroad expanded with a variety of new and old businesses. In 1886, a tornado ripped across western Iowa, with Coon Rapids in its path. The eastern part of town was demolished and two people were killed. Help poured in from around the United States and the town rebuilt. However, the wooden frontier community was vulnerable to fire. Between 1887 and 1894, a multitude of fires occurred some caused by arson, others by lightning, and others the result of cinders from flues igniting dry, shingled roofs.

During the late 19th century, Coon Rapids developed a modern, fireproof commercial district made up of brick buildings, exhibiting a variety of Victorian facades. The town installed the amenities of urban life such as theater productions, roller skating, bowling, billiards, restaurants and a variety of shops and services, dray lines and livery barns. There were wooden sidewalks and street lights. A night watch and sheriff kept night time lawlessness in control and limited racing down Main street. Now there were community celebrations such as July 4 and Decoration Day for both town and rural folk. A town baseball team was another attraction. The town became a service center for a growing agricultural economy. Church and club celebrations also became part of community life and served to integrate community and countryside.

In response to the increased town and rural population and agricultural specialization, Coon Rapids saw the appearance of service industries to support the changing farm economy. There were carpenters specializing in farm building construction, well diggers, tiling and drainage concerns, dealers in cement and other types of fencing, a creamery to support the burgeoning dairy and poultry industry. By the early twentieth century, Coon Rapids was the dominant trading center between Perry and Manning. The downtown was filled with two and three storey brick buildings and offered an array of shops, services, and amenities such as an opera house, bowling alley, restaurants, a hotel and other amusements. From a simple market and trading point, Coon Rapids had become the economic, social, recreational and service center for the four county areas. It continued in this role despite the fall in farm values in the late teens and Great Depression of the 1930s.

The entrepreneurial tradition that marks Coon Rapids was expressed in the twentieth century by businesses that served the diverse agricultural economy of the area. These included major grain dealers who maintained elevators in town, lumber men, implement dealers, a creamery and related produce stations, extensive poultry operations, a stock yard and sale barn. Of particular importance to the town's 20th century life was the emergence of the hybrid corn business.

Industrial agriculture transformed the Midwest in the post WW II era. Economies of scale shifted centers of production, for example, the poultry business became concentrated in the southeastern United States, the size of farms increased, corporate rather than individual farming operations became the norm. For Coon Rapids this had varied impacts. Garst and Thomas Seed had expanded into an international concern by the mid-1950s offering local employment opportunities . Garst and Thomas expanded physically, literally taking over many of the downtown buildings in Coon Rapids, converting them to laboratory and office space. The city's residential areas grew during the late twentieth century, largely due to the employment offered by Garst and Thomas. Although the range and variety of downtown shops and businesses changed between 1950 and the farm crisis of the 1980s, the town maintained basic services such as a grocery store, hardware store, real estate and insurance agencies, banks, lumber yard, and agricultural service businesses. In September 1959, Coon Rapids played a role in promoting détente between the United States and the Soviet Union, when area resident Roswell Garst hosted Soviet premier Nikita Khrushchev on his farm.

== Geography ==
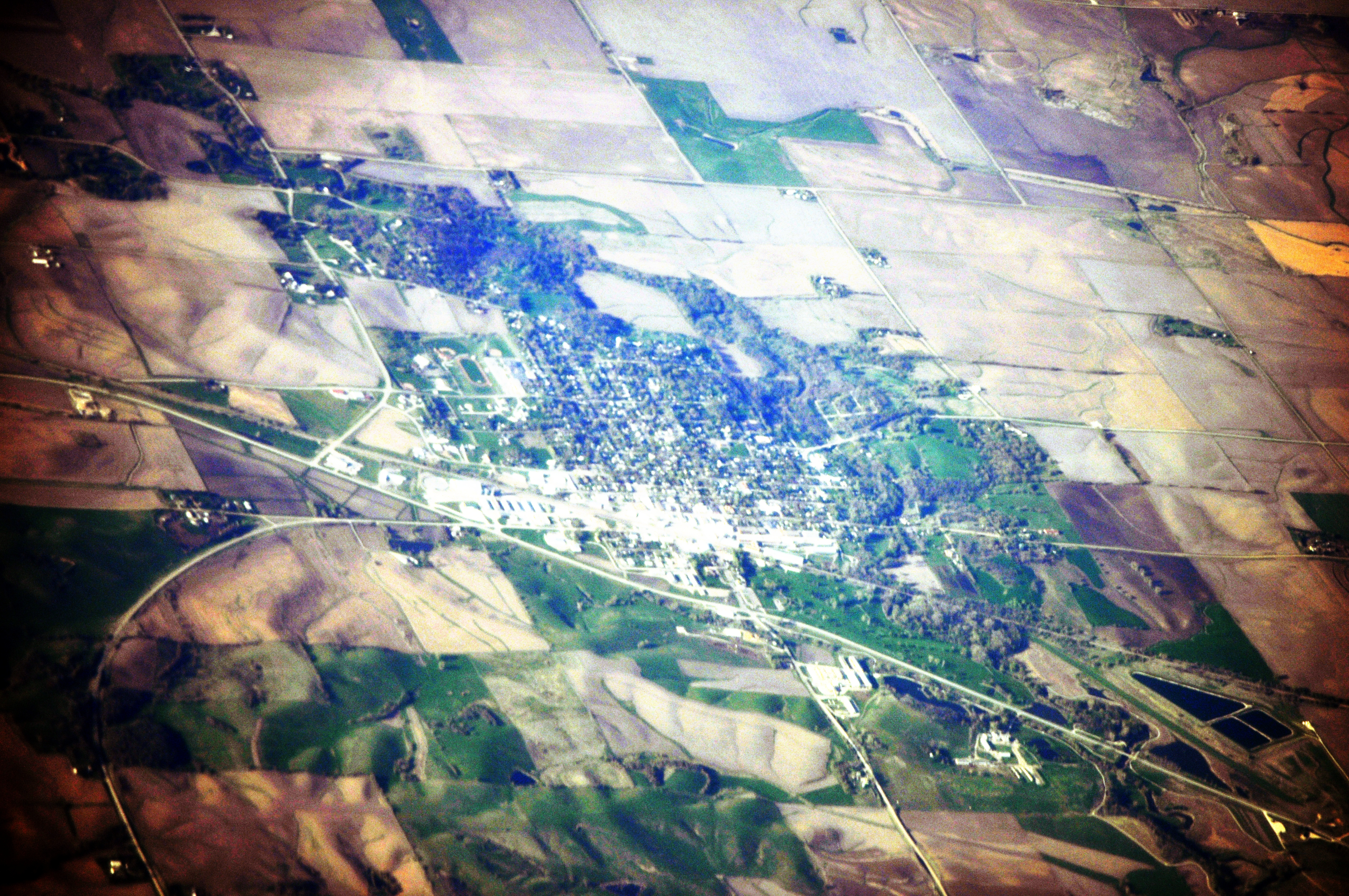
Aerial view of Coon Rapids, 2012

Coon Rapids is located along the Middle Raccoon River.

According to the United States Census Bureau, the city has a total area of 1.78 square miles (4.61 km^{2}), all land.

== Demographics ==
Historical population
Census	Pop.	Note	%±
1880	54		—
1890	873		1,516.7%
1900	1,017		16.5%
1910	1,084		6.6%
1920	1,328		22.5%
1930	1,303		−1.9%
1940	1,533		17.7%
1950	1,676		9.3%
1960	1,560		−6.9%
1970	1,381		−11.5%
1980	1,448		4.9%
1990	1,266		−12.6%
2000	1,305		3.1%
2010	1,305		0.0%
2020	1,300		−0.4%
U.S. Decennial Census

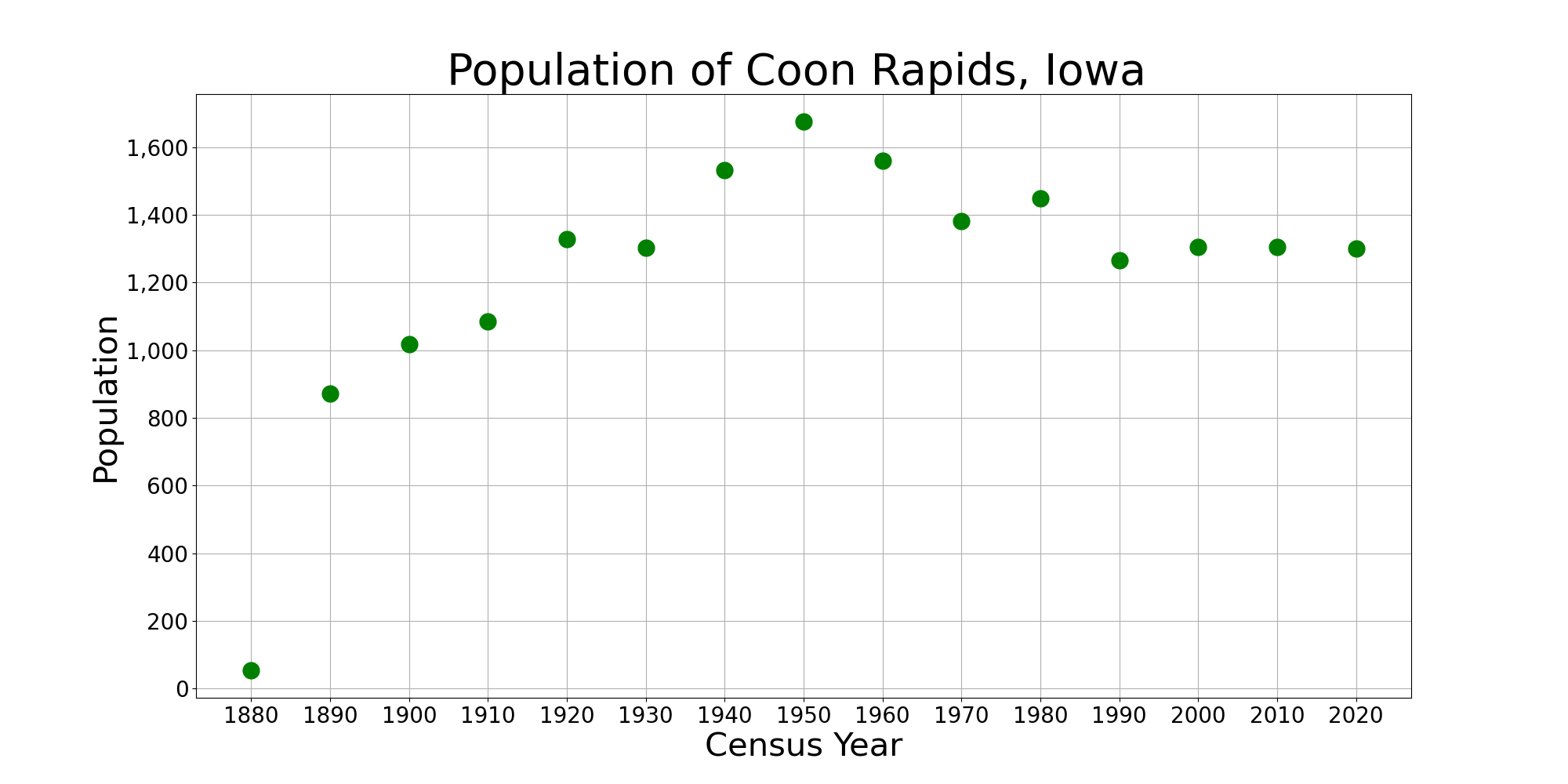
The population of Coon Rapids, Iowa from US census data

=== 2020 census ===
As of the 2020 census, there were 1,300 people, 544 households, and 325 families residing in the city. The population density was 729.1 inhabitants per square mile (281.5/km^{2}). There were 604 housing units at an average density of 338.8 per square mile (130.8/km^{2}).

There were 544 households, of which 27.8% had children under the age of 18 living with them. Of all households, 47.4% were married-couple households, 9.0% were cohabiting-couple households, 25.2% had a female householder with no spouse or partner present, and 18.4% had a male householder with no spouse or partner present. About 40.3% of households were non-families, 32.6% of all households were made up of individuals, and 17.7% had someone living alone who was 65 years of age or older.

The median age was 41.9 years. 27.2% of residents were under the age of 20; 4.5% were between the ages of 20 and 24; 21.2% were from 25 to 44; 24.3% were from 45 to 64; and 22.8% were 65 years of age or older. In total, 25.3% of residents were under the age of 18 and 22.8% were 65 years of age or older. The gender makeup of the city was 49.4% male and 50.6% female. For every 100 females, there were 97.6 males, and for every 100 females age 18 and over there were 90.8 males age 18 and over.

There were 604 housing units, of which 9.9% were vacant. The homeowner vacancy rate was 1.6% and the rental vacancy rate was 8.2%.

0.0% of residents lived in urban areas, while 100.0% lived in rural areas.

Racial composition as of the 2020 census
Race	Number	Percent
White	1,238	95.2%
Black or African American	2	0.2%
American Indian and Alaska Native	1	0.1%
Asian	0	0.0%
Native Hawaiian and Other Pacific Islander	0	0.0%
Some other race	16	1.2%
Two or more races	43	3.3%
Hispanic or Latino (of any race)	49	3.8%

=== 2010 census ===
As of the census of 2010, there were 1,305 people, 550 households, and 337 families residing in the city. The population density was 733.1 inhabitants per square mile (283.1/km^{2}). There were 613 housing units at an average density of 344.4 per square mile (133.0/km^{2}). The racial makeup of the city was 97.7% White, 0.1% African American, 0.1% Native American, 1.4% from other races, and 0.8% from two or more races. Hispanic or Latino of any race were 3.3% of the population.

There were 550 households, of which 28.9% had children under the age of 18 living with them, 49.1% were married couples living together, 8.5% had a female householder with no husband present, 3.6% had a male householder with no wife present, and 38.7% were non-families. 35.3% of all households were made up of individuals, and 18.6% had someone living alone who was 65 years of age or older. The average household size was 2.30 and the average family size was 2.97.

The median age in the city was 41.3 years. 25.9% of residents were under the age of 18; 5.1% were between the ages of 18 and 24; 21.8% were from 25 to 44; 23.7% were from 45 to 64; and 23.4% were 65 years of age or older. The gender makeup of the city was 47.0% male and 53.0% female.

=== 2000 census ===
As of the census of 2000, there were 1,305 people, 543 households, and 346 families residing in the city. The population density was 750.7 inhabitants per square mile (289.8/km^{2}). There were 571 housing units at an average density of 328.5 per square mile (126.8/km^{2}). The racial makeup of the city was 99.16% White, 0.61% African American, 0.15% Native American, and 0.08% from two or more races. Hispanic or Latino of any race were 1.76% of the population.

There were 543 households, out of which 27.8% had children under the age of 18 living with them, 53.6% were married couples living together, 7.9% had a female householder with no husband present, and 36.1% were non-families. 33.9% of all households were made up of individuals, and 19.7% had someone living alone who was 65 years of age or older. The average household size was 2.31 and the average family size was 2.95.

Age spread: 23.0% under the age of 18, 7.0% from 18 to 24, 23.0% from 25 to 44, 21.6% from 45 to 64, and 25.8% who were 65 years of age or older. The median age was 43 years. For every 100 females, there were 89.7 males. For every 100 females age 18 and over, there were 83.4 males.

The median income for a household in the city was $32,951, and the median income for a family was $39,800. Males had a median income of $29,018 versus $22,167 for females. The per capita income for the city was $16,765. About 6.8% of families and 9.1% of the population were below the poverty line, including 13.7% of those under age 18 and 7.7% of those age 67 or over.

== Education ==
Coon Rapids is located in the Coon Rapids–Bayard Community School District. The district was established on July 1, 1988, by the merger of the Bayard and Coon Rapids school districts.

== Iowa Great Place ==
In October 2005, Coon Rapids-Whiterock area was elected a "Great Place" of Iowa for its rich history and resources, and creative future vision. The Great Places program, launched by Governor Tom Vilsack and implemented by the Department of Cultural Affairs, aimed to concentrate state agency resources on high-potential communities.

The local Great Place committee represents an alliance between the nonprofit Whiterock Conservancy, the City of Coon Rapids, and the Coon Rapids Development Group. Whiterock Conservancy is an Iowan nonprofit organized in late 2004 to administer a 5,000-acre (20 km^{2}) private conservation land donation from the Garst family of Coon Rapids. Its goals are environmental restoration, sustainable agriculture, and low-impact public use and education.

The first three Iowa Great Places (Coon Rapids, Clinton and Sioux City) were each awarded $1 million in seed money by the Iowa legislature. In September 2007, Coon Rapids was also awarded a $1.7 million Vision Iowa grant. The Coon Rapids Great Place Program combines natural resource restoration with trails, public park development, elder care, diversity, historic preservation, microenterprise support, and tourism marketing.

== Notable people ==
- David Garst (1926–2006) President of Garst Seed Company Worked for different presidential administrations
- Roswell Garst (1898–1977) Internationally prominent farmer and hosted Nikita Khrushchev at his farm
- Warren Garst (1850–1924) Nineteenth governor of Iowa
- Jay King "Babe" Towne (1880–1938) MLB played for the winning 1906 World Series team the Chicago White Sox

== See also ==
- Roswell and Elizabeth Garst Farmstead Historic District
- Whiterock Conservancy
- Krushchev in Iowa Trail
