= Carolyn Ren =

Chinese-Canadian microfluidics researcher

Carolyn L. Ren is a Chinese-Canadian researcher in microfluidics. She holds a tier 1 Canada Research Chair in Microfluidic Technologies as a professor at the University of Waterloo, in the Department of Mechanical and Mechatronics Engineering, where she directs the Waterloo Microfluidics Laboratory. She has also founded multiple spinoff companies to commercialize her research discoveries.

== Education and career ==
Ren graduated from the Harbin Institute of Technology with a bachelor's degree in thermal engineering in 1992, and continued at the Harbin Institute of Technology for a master's degree in 1995. After working for four years as a lecturer in power engineering at the Dalian University of Technology, she came to Canada for doctoral study in mechanical engineering, completing her Ph.D. in 2004 at the University of Toronto.

She joined the Department of Mechanical and Mechatronics Engineering as an assistant professor in 2004, and was tenured as an associate professor there in 2010. She is also the co-founder of four spinoff companies, including Advanced Electrophoresis Solutions Limited, QuantWave Technologies Incorporated, and Air Microfluidics.

== Recognition ==
Ren is a 2004 recipient of the Canada Foundation for Innovation Award, a 2007 recipient of the Early Research Award of the Government of Ontario, and a 2010 recipient of the Engineering Research Excellence Award of the University of Waterloo.

After previously holding a tier 2 Canada Research Chair in Lab-on-Chip Technology, from 2009 to 2014, Ren was given the tier 1 Canada Research Chair in Microfluidic Technologies in 2022.

Ren was elected as a Fellow of the Canadian Society of Mechanical Engineering in 2012. She was named to the College of New Scholars of the Royal Society of Canada in 2018, elected to the Canadian Academy of Engineering in 2023, and to the Engineering Institute of Canada in 2024.
