= Corston =

Corston may refer to:

- Corston, Somerset, village in the county of Somerset in the United Kingdom
- Corston, Wiltshire, village in the county of Wiltshire in the United Kingdom
- Baroness Corston (born 1942), British politician, and her review of women in prison (2007)
- Tom Corston (born 1949), bishop of Moosonee, Canada
