= Lula Woods Garst =

American physician (1897–1974)

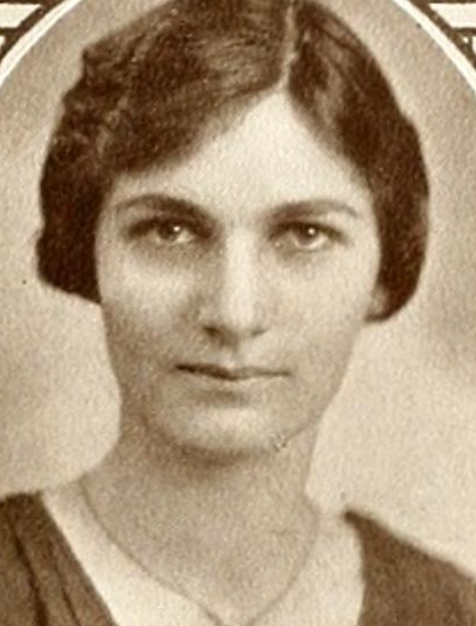
- Lula Woods Garst, from a 1924 yearbook
- Born: January 5, 1897; Natural Bridge, Virginia, U.S.
- Died: March 19, 1974 (aged 77); Roanoke, Virginia, U.S.
- Occupation: Physician

Lula Woods Garst (January 5, 1897 – March 19, 1974) was an American physician. She was on the staff of the Catawba Sanatorium in Virginia for over forty years, treating tuberculosis patients from 1926 to 1967.

== Early life ==
Garst was born in Natural Bridge, Virginia, the daughter of Thomas Dillard Garst and Mary Susan Lewis Garst. She graduated from Westhampton College in 1918. In 1924, she earned her medical degree at the Medical College of Virginia, where she was in the school's first cohort of female medical students, and a founding member of the college's chapter of Alpha Epsilon Iota, along with Mary Baughman and Gladys Smithwick. In 1931 she took leave to study gastroenterology at Johns Hopkins School of Medicine.

== Career ==
After college, Garst was employed as a bacteriologist for the City of Richmond. Garst completed an internship at Metropolitan Hospital in New York. Beginning in 1926, she served on the staff of the Catawba Sanatorium for Tuberculosis for over forty years. She also wrote a history of the sanatorium, Catawba Sanatorium golden anniversary: Background history and highlights, 1909-1959. She retired from Catawba Sanatorium in 1967.

== Publications ==
- "Report on the Infestation of Intestinal Parasites Throughout Virginia" (1948, with A. W. Bengtson)
- Catawba Sanatorium golden anniversary: Background history and highlights, 1909-1959

== Personal life ==
Garst lived on the grounds of the sanatorium from 1926 to 1952, when she was allowed to lived near the hospital grounds instead. She died in 1974, aged 77 years, in Roanoke, Virginia.
