= Roswell Garst =

American businessman and farmer (1898–1977)

Roswell "Bob" Garst (June 13, 1898 – November 4, 1977) was an American farmer and seed company executive. He developed hybrid corn seed in 1930 that allowed greater crop yields than open-pollinated corn. He hosted Nikita Khrushchev on his farm in Coon Rapids, Iowa, on September 23, 1959. He sold hybrid seed to the Soviet Union beginning in 1955 and played a role in improving United States-Soviet communication.

== Biography ==
Roswell Garst's parents were Edward Garst and Bertha Goodwin. He married Elizabeth Henak on January 31, 1921. Garst was founder of Garst & Thomas Co., which became one of the world's largest producers of hybrid seed corn. In the 1930s, Garst traveled around the Midwest convincing farmers of the benefits of hybrid seed corn. As an international agriculturalist, he encouraged modern farming methods to improve food production in many nations, including the Soviet Union, Chile, Hungary, Germany, and France. Garst was famous for offering (sometimes unsolicited) advice. When Khrushchev visited Coon Rapids, Garst could not help but discuss the US-Soviet political situation, and told Khrushchev, "You know, for a peasant, you're a damned poor horse trader." Khrushchev apparently liked Garst enough after his previous visits to the Soviet Union to demand that Garst's farm be included on his 1959 tour of the United States, where he famously stated that Iowan corn was superior to Ukrainian corn. Garst made six trips to the Soviet Union to teach about hybrid seed and farm mechanization. He also sent his sons, including David Garst, on similar trips. Garst, in his own view, was not only an agriculturalist, but also a goodwill ambassador promoting peace during the Cold War.

Garst was diagnosed with cancer of the larynx in 1963. He died in 1977.

== Farm ==
Since Garst's death, his farmstead has been preserved; in 2009, it was placed on the National Register of Historic Places under the title of "Roswell and Elizabeth Garst Farmstead Historic District." The farm was seen as historically significant because of its importance in general American history and because of its place as Garst's home.

== Further reading and video ==
- Lee, Harold. Roswell Garst: A Biography. Ames: Iowa State University Press, 1984.
- Lowitt, Richard and Harold Lee, eds. Letters from an American Farmer: The Eastern European and Russian Correspondence of Roswell Garst. Dekalb, Illinois: Northern Illinois University Press, 1987.
- "Cold War Roadshow* American Experience, PBS, 2014.
