= Garst Seed Company =

US-based seed company

- Company type: Agriculture/Subsidiary
- Industry: Agriculture
- Founded: Coon Rapids, Iowa (1931)
- Defunct: December 31, 2013
- Fate: Retired by Syngenta
- Headquarters: Slater, Iowa, United States
- Key people: Roswell Garst, Founder; Charley Thomas, Founder
- Products: Hybrid and varietal seeds
- Parent: Syngenta
- Website: Golden Harvest Seeds

Garst Seed Company was a U.S.-based subsidiary of Syngenta that produced hybrid seeds for agriculture.

== History ==
In 1931, Garst and Thomas Hi-Bred Corn Company was founded by Roswell Garst and Charley Thomas in Coon Rapids, Iowa, and was "instrumental in promoting the use of hybrid corn." During the Cold War, Garst formed a relationship with Nikita Khrushchev and assisted the USSR in modernizing its corn production.

In 1983, the company split up and Garst Seed Company was formed.

In 1985 Garst was acquired by Imperial Chemical Industries's American subsidiary.

In 1993, ICI sold off its North American assets, and Garst seed business became part of a new company called Zeneca.

In 1996, Garst became part of Advanta Group, formed through the merger of Zeneca Seeds and VanderHave. Zeneca became part of AstraZeneca and VanderHave was controlled by a Dutch farmer-owned co-operative called Cosun U.A.

In 2004, Astrazeneca and Cosun sold Garst to Syngenta.

In 2013, Syngenta announced the retirement of the Garst seed brand. Operations ceased in 2014 and remaining Garst hybrid corn seed products were rebranded to Golden Harvest.
