= Garston =

Garston could refer to several places:

== England ==
- Garston, Hertfordshire
  - Garston railway station (Hertfordshire)
- Garston, Liverpool, Merseyside
  - Garston railway station (Merseyside)

== New Zealand ==
- Garston, New Zealand, town in the Southland District
