= Ren Xun =

Chinese painter

Ren Xun (Chinese: 任薰; pinyin: Rén Xūn; Wade–Giles: Jen Hsün; ca. 1835–1893) was a Chinese painter during the Qing Dynasty.

Ren was born in Xiaoshan in Zhejiang province. Ren came from a family of artists, his brother was Ren Xiong. His paintings were primarily of human figures, done in the style of Chen Hongshou. He was one of the "Four Rens of Shanghai"

Today, his work is held in the permanent collections of many museums worldwide, including the Palace Museum, the British Museum, the Metropolitan Museum of Art, the University of Michigan Museum of Art, the Yale University Art Gallery, the Harvard Art Museums, and the Brooklyn Museum.
