= Ren Xiong =

Chinese Qing dynasty painter (1823–1857)

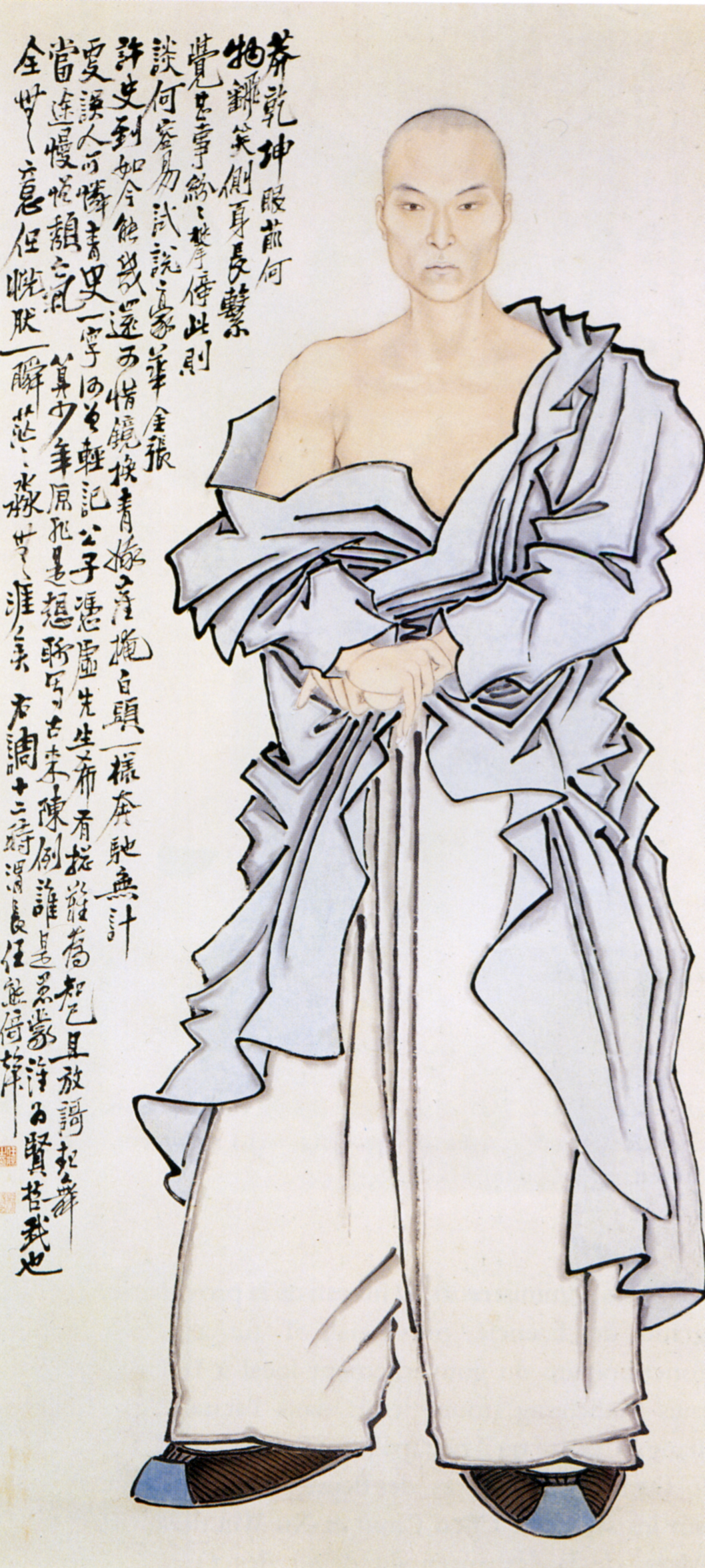
Ren Xiong's self-portrait

Ren Xiong (Chinese: 任熊; pinyin: Rén Xióng; courtesy name: Weichang 渭長, also known as Xiangpu 湘浦; art name: Bushe 不捨; July 19, 1823 – November 23, 1857) was a Chinese painter from Xiaoshan, Zhejiang, active during the late Qing dynasty. Ren belonged to the Shanghai School in Chinese painting and is known for his bold and innovative style. His paintings significantly influenced the Shanghai School and modern Chinese painting.

== Career ==
After leaving his teacher, Ren traveled to various cities to make a living through painting. In Hangzhou, he received support from his fellow townsman Lu Yeshan and connected with many other artists.

During this period, his portrait paintings gained recognition. He continued studying traditional art, copying the stone engravings of Sixteen Arhats by Guanxiu at the Shengyin Temple on Gushan Island.

Zhou Xian of Western Zhejiang admired Ren's work and invited him to the Fanhu Cottage, where Ren spent eight years studying and copying classical masterpieces. He would repeatedly copy works until he could match or surpass the originals.

Later, the Ningbo scholar Yao Xie invited Ren to study his extensive collection of paintings from the Song, Yuan, Ming, and Qing dynasties. During this time, Ren created 120 paintings inspired by Yao Xie's poetry (now in the Palace Museum).

== Artistic style ==
Ren was proficient in various genres including figure painting, flowers-and-birds, and landscape painting, working in both meticulous (gongbi) and freehand (xieyi) styles.

He was particularly renowned for his figure paintings. His style was primarily influenced by Chen Hongshou, though Ren developed his own distinct approach characterized by fresh, lively brushwork, quiet elegance, and decorative appeal.

According to many scholars of Chinese art, the particular definition of pictorial naturalism, might result from contacts established with the art of photography, rather than a “simple” assimilation of Western painting techniques and models.

== Paintings ==
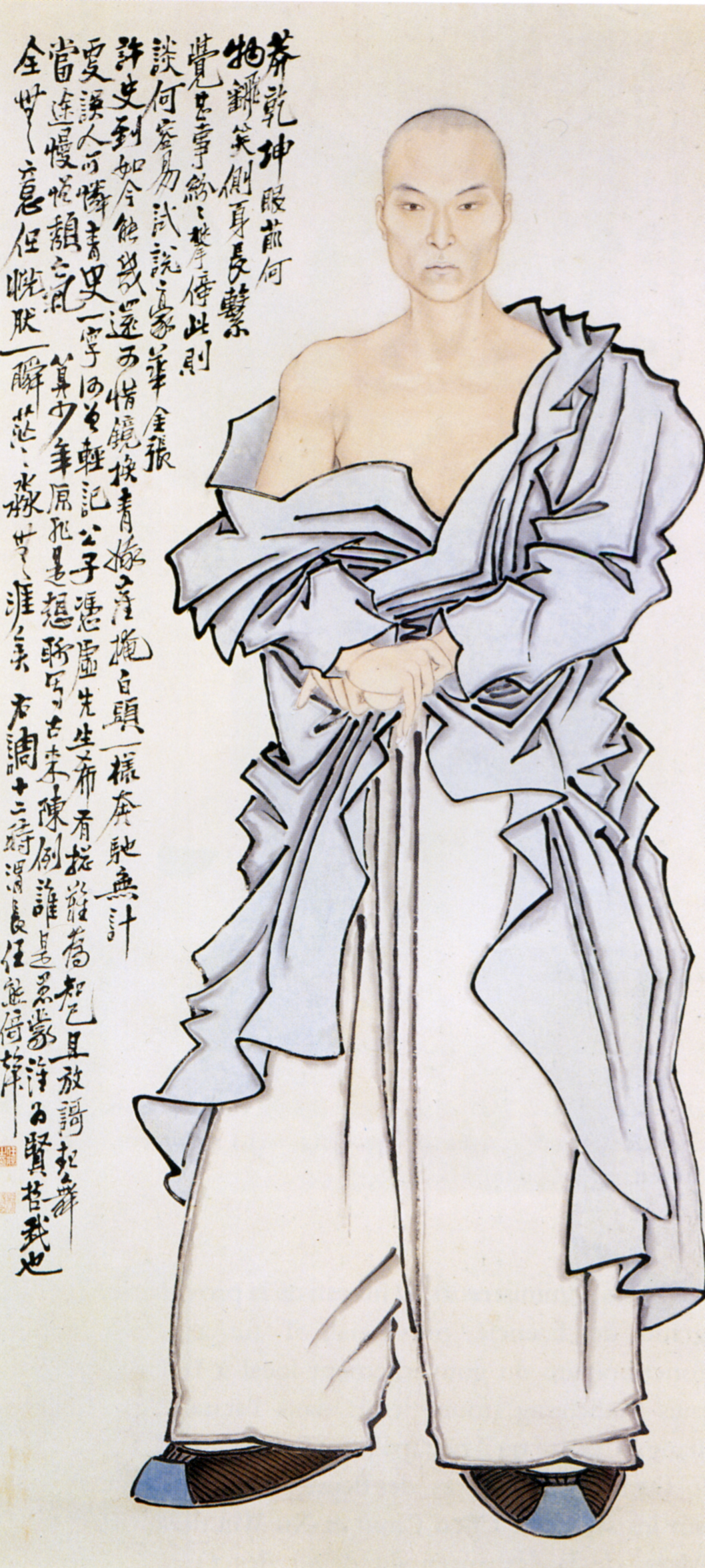
Self-portrait

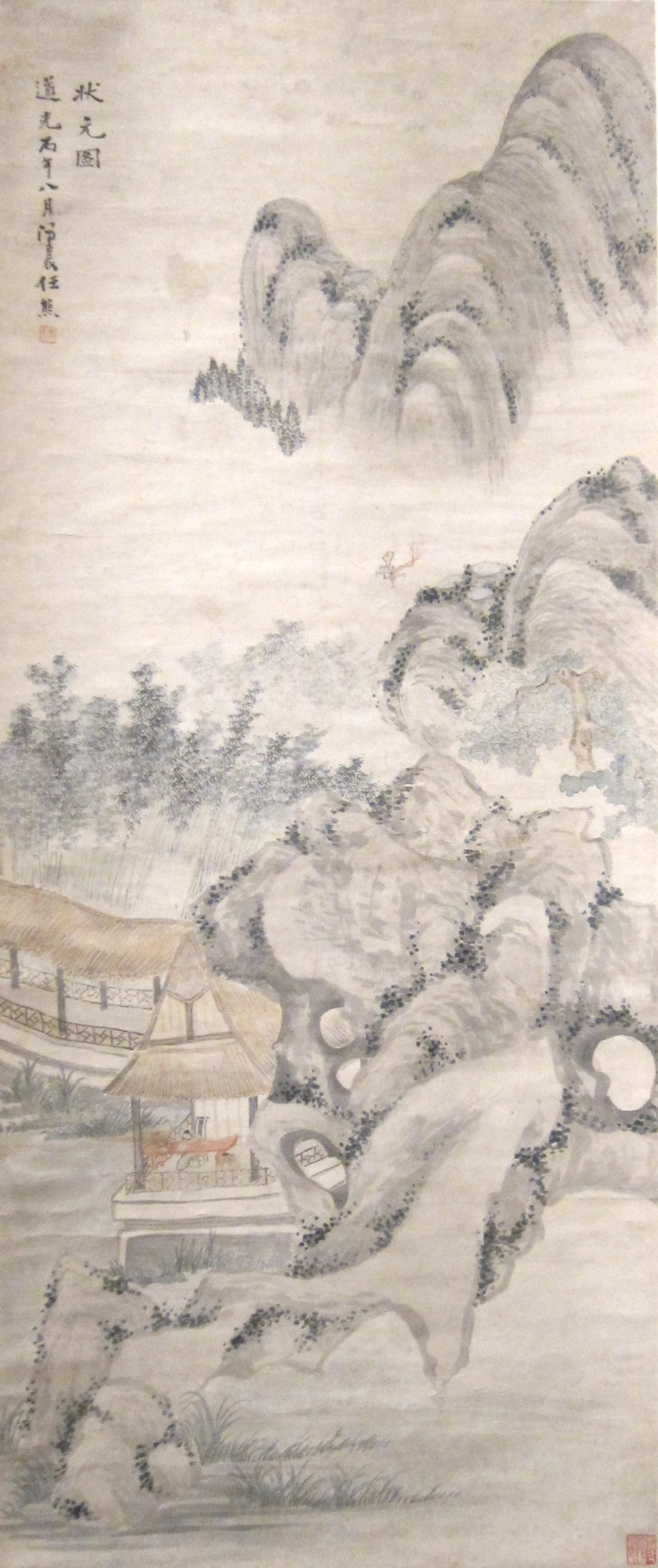
The Examination Candidate

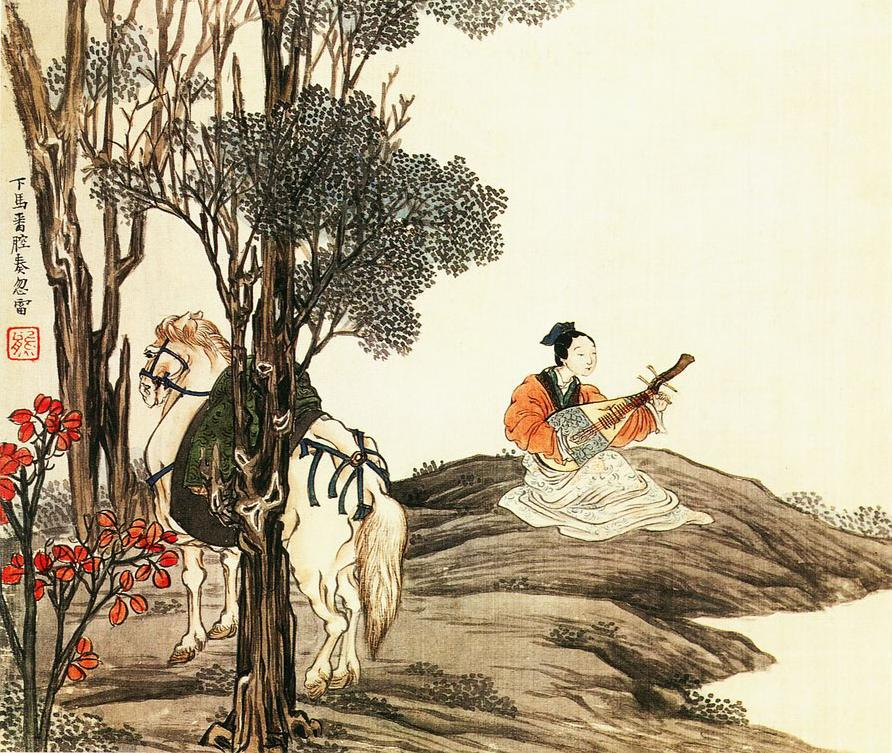
After the poems of Da Mei

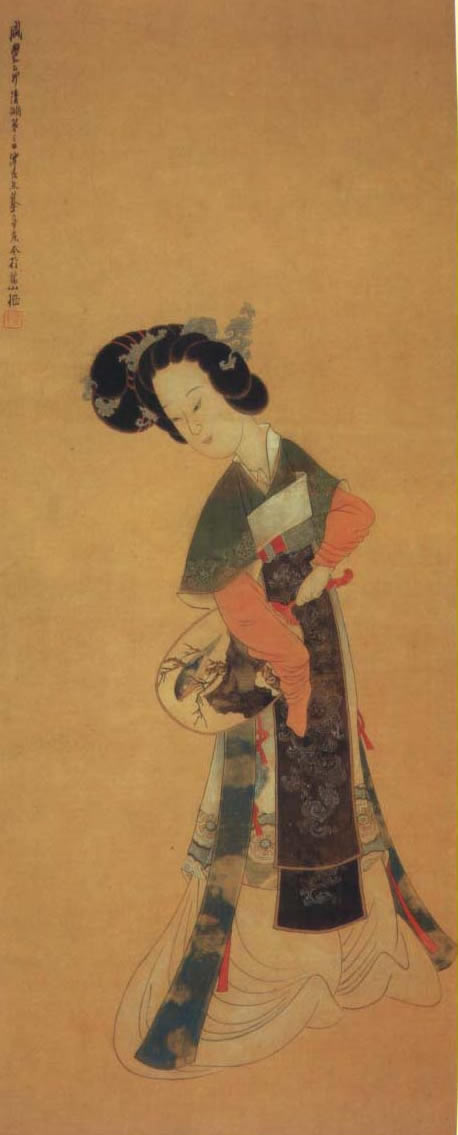
(title not known)

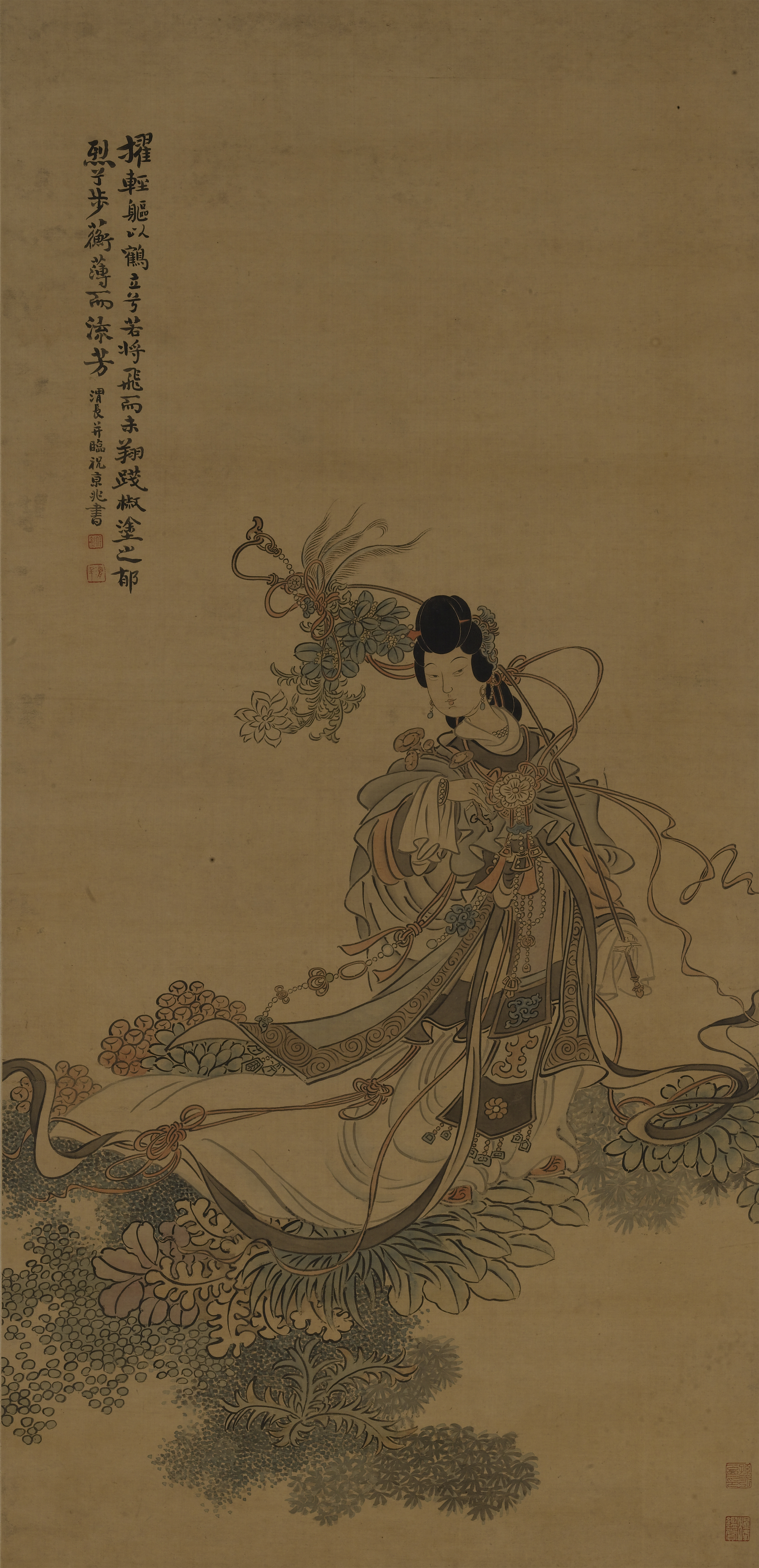
The Goddess of the Luo River

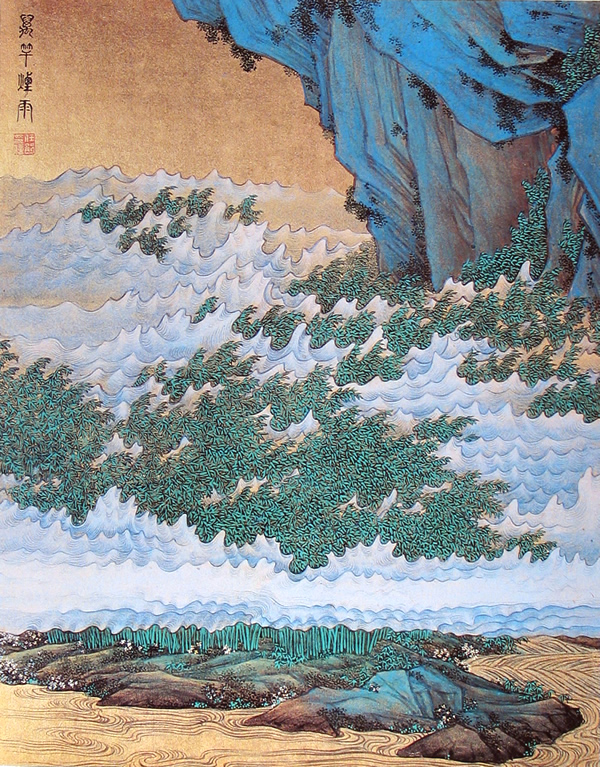
Palace Museum

== Family and legacy ==
Ren Xiong was part of a family of artists known as the "Four Rens," which included his son Ren Yu, brother Ren Xun, and nephew Ren Yi.

He, along with Ren Xun and Ren Yi, were also known as the "Three Rens of Shanghai”.
