= National Register of Historic Places listings in Dallas County, Iowa =

Location of Dallas County in Iowa

Dallas County, Iowa, United States, has 18 properties and districts listed on the National Register of Historic Places. Another property was once listed but has been removed.

Latitude and longitude coordinates are provided for many National Register properties and districts; these locations may be seen together in a map.

This National Park Service list is complete through NPS recent listings posted January 2, 2026.

== Current listings ==
	Name on the Register	Image	Date listed	Location	City or town	Description
1	Adel Bridge	Adel Bridge	April 18, 2002 (#02000374)	River St. 41°36′57″N 94°00′43″W	Adel	
2	Adel Public Square Historic District	Adel Public Square Historic District	December 18, 2009 (#09000106)	About four blocks in downtown Adel centered on the public square 41°37′04″N 94°01′05″W	Adel	
3	Beaver Creek Bridge		June 25, 1998 (#98000796)	M Ave. over Beaver Creek; 41°50′47″N 94°02′53″W	Perry	
4	Bruce's Snowball Market No. 1 Addition	Bruce's Snowball Market No. 1 Addition	September 8, 2000 (#00001004)	921 Railroad St. 41°50′15″N 94°06′17″W	Perry	
5	Dallas County Courthouse	Dallas County Courthouse	November 26, 1973 (#73000723)	Town Sq. 41°37′04″N 94°01′03″W	Adel	
6	Dayton Stagecoach Inn and Tavern Historic District		November 17, 2021 (#100007139)	14750 Pecos Ct. 41°49′32″N 93°58′29″W	Bouton vicinity	
7	Dexter Community House	Dexter Community House	March 3, 1975 (#75000679)	707 Dallas St. 41°31′01″N 94°13′36″W	Dexter	
8	Downtown Perry Historic District	Downtown Perry Historic District	September 8, 2000 (#00001005)	Between 3rd St., Lucinda St., 1st Ave., and Railroad St. 41°50′24″N 94°06′14″W	Perry	
9	Robert William Andrew Feller Farmstead	Robert William Andrew Feller Farmstead	December 17, 1999 (#99001570)	2965 340th Tr. 41°32′45″N 93°54′29″W	Van Meter	
10	Jones Business College	Jones Business College	November 30, 2000 (#00001006)	1305 Otley Ave. 41°50′15″N 94°06′12″W	Perry	
11	Anthony M. McColl House	Anthony M. McColl House	February 5, 1987 (#87000026)	502 S. Main St. 41°51′12″N 93°55′19″W	Woodward	
12	Minburn Railroad Depot	Minburn Railroad Depot	December 7, 2015 (#15000863)	210 4th St. 41°45′18″N 94°01′42″W	Minburn	
13	Perry Carnegie Library Building	Perry Carnegie Library Building	October 3, 1996 (#96001061)	1123 Willis Ave. 41°50′18″N 94°06′18″W	Perry	
14	Prairie Center Methodist Episcopal Church and Pleasand Hill Cemetery	Prairie Center Methodist Episcopal Church and Pleasand Hill Cemetery	October 12, 2004 (#04001141)	Beaumont Ave. and 200th St. 41°44′45″N 94°15′02″W	Yale	
15	Redfield GAR Hall		November 13, 2023 (#100009484)	1213 Thomas St. 41°35′27″N 94°11′45″W	Redfield	
16	St. Boniface Catholic Church		January 2, 2024 (#100009671)	250 4th St. 41°36′46″N 93°52′58″W	Waukee	
17	St. Patrick's Catholic Church and Rectory	St. Patrick's Catholic Church and Rectory	March 22, 2011 (#11000138)	1312 Third St. 41°50′27″N 94°06′12″W	Perry	
18	John Wilson House		March 30, 1979 (#79000894)	Southwest of De Soto; 41°30′30″N 94°05′33″W	De Soto	

== Former listing ==
	Name on the Register	Image	Date listed	Date removed	Location	City or town	Description
1	Mosher Building		January 25, 1991 (#90002192)	May 22, 1998	1017 Railroad	Perry	
2	Perry Volunteer Fire Department Engine House		November 7, 1978 (#78001212)	October 15, 1980	1208 1st St.	Perry	Demolished on June 20, 1980

== See also ==
- List of National Historic Landmarks in Iowa
- National Register of Historic Places listings in Iowa
- Listings in neighboring counties: Adair, Boone, Greene, Guthrie, Madison, Polk, Warren
