= Bob Feller Museum =

Baseball museum in Iowa, U.S.

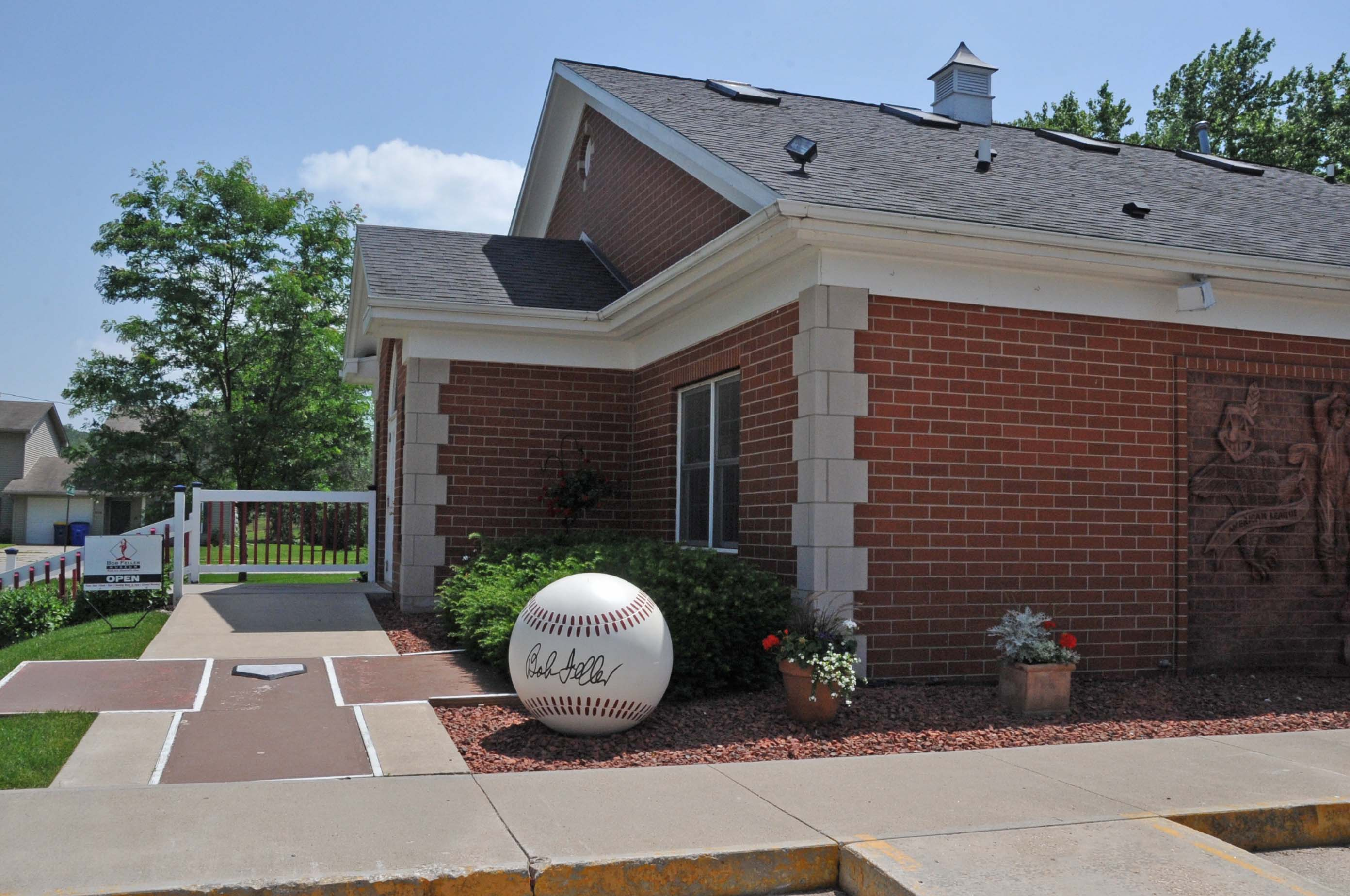
- Established: June 10, 1995; 31 years ago
- Location: 310 Mill Street, Van Meter, Iowa, 50261
- Director: Brandon Sawalich

The Bob Feller Museum was a baseball museum located in Van Meter, Iowa. The Bob Feller Museum was founded in 1995 to honor Baseball Hall of Fame pitcher Bob Feller of the Cleveland Indians in Feller's hometown of Van Meter. Through 2015, the museum housed memorabilia and items collected by Feller. The building was donated to the city in 2015 and today, it serves as the City Hall of Van Meter, Iowa. Items are no longer on display.

== History ==
The museum concept advanced in 1990, when a committee was formed in Bob Feller's hometown of Van Meter, Iowa for the purpose of establishing a museum honoring Feller.

Several fundraising projects followed. During the process, Feller served as Grand Marshall of a local Fireman's Kids Day and was interviewed by journalist Charles Kuralt with the interview airing on the CBS show, Sunday Morning. In 1993, Ted Williams came to Iowa for an Iowa Cubs game in Des Moines, Iowa and a fundraising dinner was held in conjunction with his visit.

After successful fundraising efforts, the Bob Feller Museum opened in Van Meter, Iowa, on June 10, 1995, with a crowd of 800 in attendance. The museum was designed by Feller's son Stephen, an architect. The museum property was donated for the project by Brenton Banks.

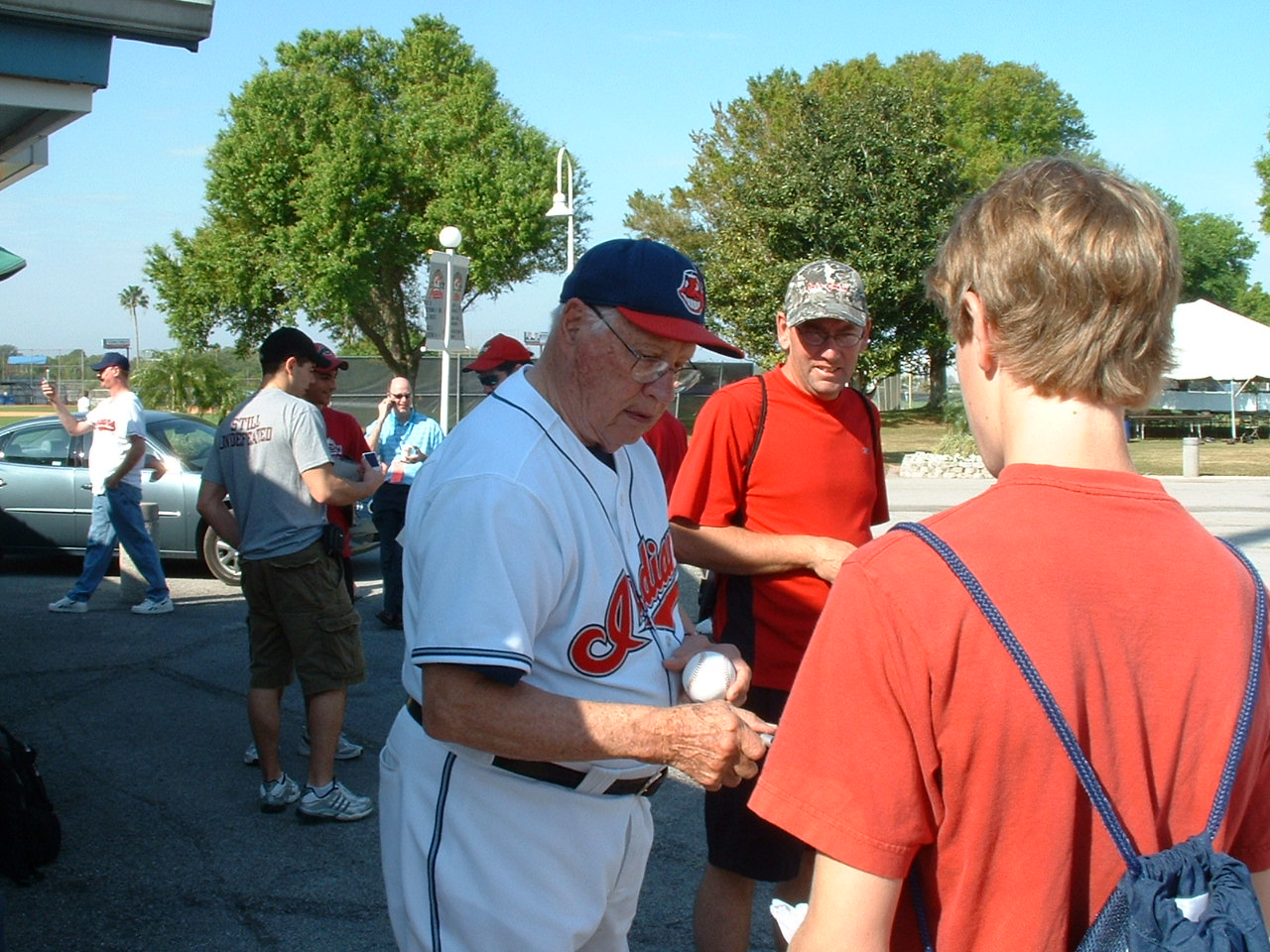
Bob Feller signing autographs for fans at Indians' Spring Training in 2007

The museum contained Feller memorabilia and items from his own collection. A bat used by Babe Ruth when he made his last public appearance at Yankee Stadium was at the museum. Feller said a teammate had stolen the bat and eventually it was purchased by the Upper Deck sports card company for $107,000. Feller later offered the company $95,000 in return for the bat.

Following Feller's death in 2010, the museum faced funding issues. In 2015, with family approval, the Bob Feller Museum was donated to the city of Van Meter for use as the city hall. Some artifacts remain on permanent exhibit without charge. Other artifacts were moved to Cleveland, Ohio, where the Cleveland Guardians have the items on display within Progressive Field.

"He truly was the engine that made that place run and with his passing, the museum struggled," explained museum board member Bob DiBiasio, who also served senior vice president of public affairs for the Cleveland Indians.
