= Bob Feller =

American baseball pitcher (1918–2010)

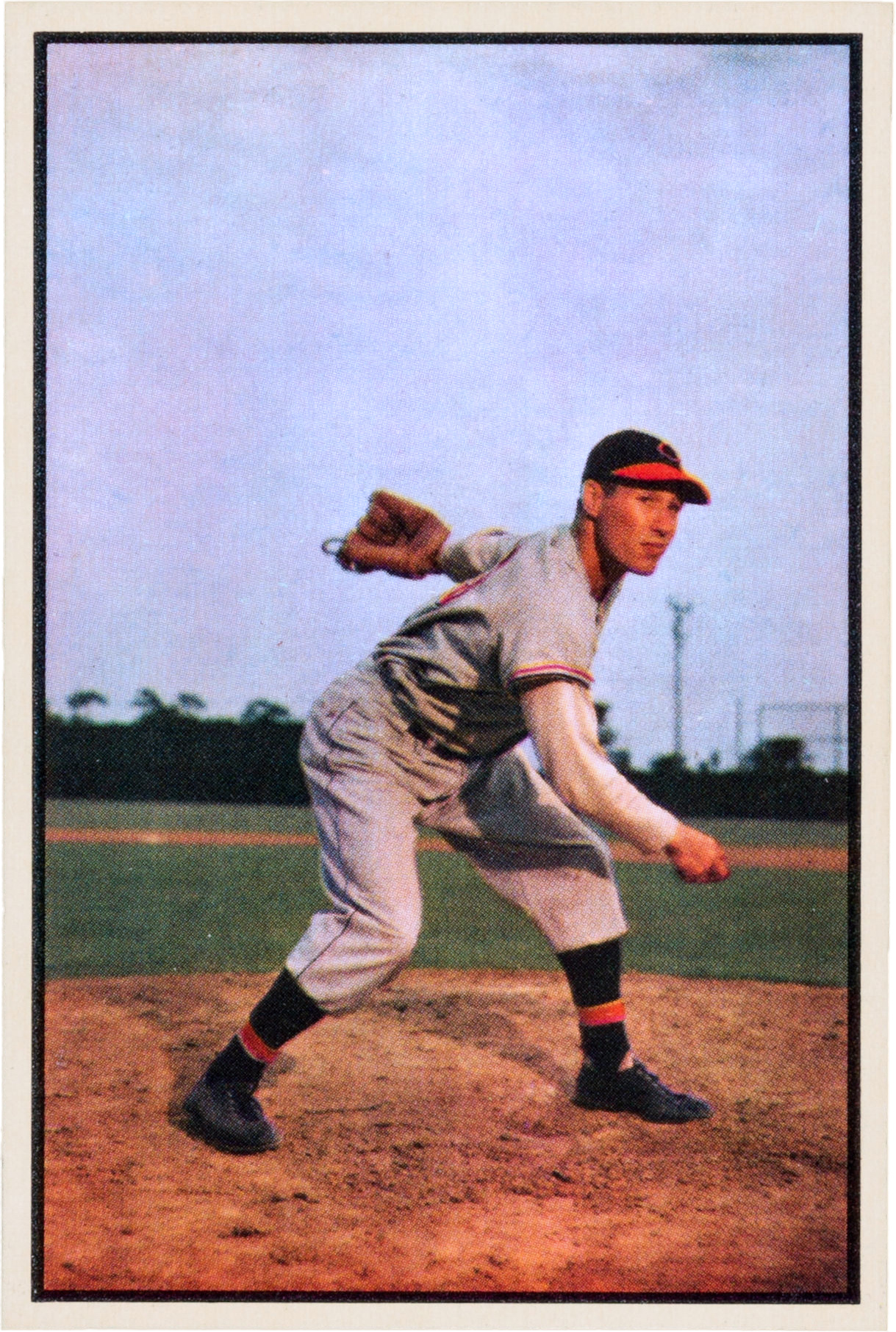
- Feller with the Cleveland Indians, c. 1953
- Pitcher
- Born: November 3, 1918; Van Meter, Iowa, U.S.
- Died: December 15, 2010 (aged 92); Cleveland, Ohio, U.S.
- Batted: Right Threw: Right

MLB debut
- July 19, 1936, for the Cleveland Indians

Last MLB appearance
- September 30, 1956, for the Cleveland Indians

MLB statistics
- Win–loss record: 266–162
- Earned run average: 3.25
- Strikeouts: 2,581
- Stats at Baseball Reference

Teams
- Cleveland Indians (1936–1941, 1945–1956)

Career highlights and awards
- 8× All-Star (1938–1941, 1946–1948, 1950); World Series champion (1948); Triple Crown (1940); 6× AL wins leader (1939–1941, 1946–1947, 1951); AL ERA leader (1940); 7× MLB strikeout leader (1938–1941, 1946–1948); Pitched three no-hitters (1940, 1946, 1951); Cleveland Guardians No. 19 retired; Cleveland Guardians Hall of Fame

Member of the National

Baseball Hall of Fame
- Induction: 1962
- Vote: 93.8% (first ballot)
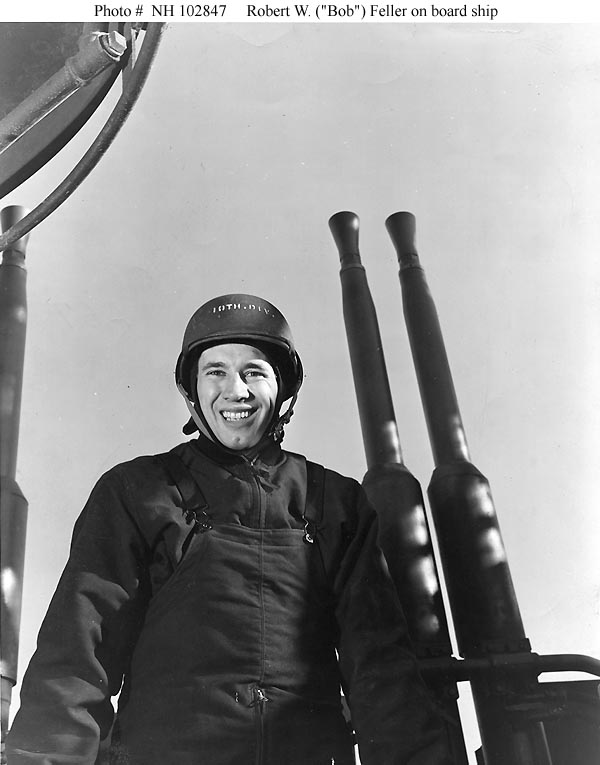
Military career
40 mm gun captain during World War II
Spouses	Virginia Winther (m. 1943; div. 1971); Anne Thorpe (m. 1974)
Allegiance	United States
Branch	United States Navy
Service years	1941–1945
Rank	Chief Petty Officer
Unit	USS Alabama
Conflicts	World War II; Battle of the Atlantic; Pacific War; Battle of Tarawa; Operation Flintlock; Battle of the Philippine Sea

Robert William Andrew Feller (November 3, 1918 – December 15, 2010), nicknamed "the Heater from Van Meter", "Bullet Bob", and "Rapid Robert", was an American professional baseball player who was a pitcher for 18 seasons in Major League Baseball (MLB) for the Cleveland Indians between 1936 and 1956. In a career spanning 570 games, Feller pitched 3,827 innings and posted a win–loss record of 266–162, with 279 complete games, 44 shutouts, and a 3.25 earned run average (ERA). His career 2,581 strikeouts were third all-time upon his retirement.

A prodigy who bypassed baseball's minor leagues, Feller made his debut with the Indians at the age of 17. His career was interrupted by four years of military service (1942–1945) as a United States Navy Chief Petty Officer aboard USS Alabama during World War II. Feller became the first pitcher to win 24 games in a season before the age of 21. He threw no-hitters in 1940, 1946, and 1951, and 12 one-hitters, both records at his retirement. He helped the Indians win a World Series title in 1948 and an American League-record 111 wins and the pennant in 1954. Feller led the American League in wins six times and in strikeouts seven times. In 1946 he recorded 348 strikeouts, the most since 1904 and then believed to be a record.

An eight-time All-Star, Feller was ranked 36th on Sporting News's 1999 list of the 100 Greatest Baseball Players and was named the publication's "greatest pitcher of his time". He was a finalist for the Major League Baseball All-Century Team in 1999. Baseball Hall of Fame member Ted Williams called Feller "the fastest and best pitcher I ever saw during my career." Hall of Famer Stan Musial believed he was "probably the greatest pitcher of our era." He was elected into the Baseball Hall of Fame in 1962 in his first year of eligibility, with the then fourth highest percentage of votes. He was elected the inaugural President of the Major League Baseball Players' Association and both organized and participated in barnstorm exhibition games which featured players from both the Major and Negro leagues. Feller died at the age of 92 in 2010.

== Early life ==
Feller played primarily as a shortstop or outfielder, emulating Rogers Hornsby's batting stance. From the age of 15, he began to pitch for the Oakviews after a starting pitcher was injured; while doing so, Feller continued to play American Legion baseball. His catcher during this period was Nile Kinnick, who later won the Heisman Trophy in 1939 and became a member of the College Football Hall of Fame.

A student at Van Meter High School, Feller was a starting pitcher for the school's baseball team. During this time, he continued to play on the Farmers Union team in the American Amateur Baseball Congress, and had 19 wins and four losses for Farmers Union one season. He also was the starting center for the high school basketball team. By the age of 16, Feller possessed what critics judged a high quality fastball; major league scouts traveled to Dayton, Ohio, to watch him in the annual national baseball tournament. After the game, several big league clubs offered signing bonuses with their contract offers, but he had already been signed to a professional contract with the Cleveland Indians.

== Professional career ==
=== Teenage phenomenon (1936–1941) ===
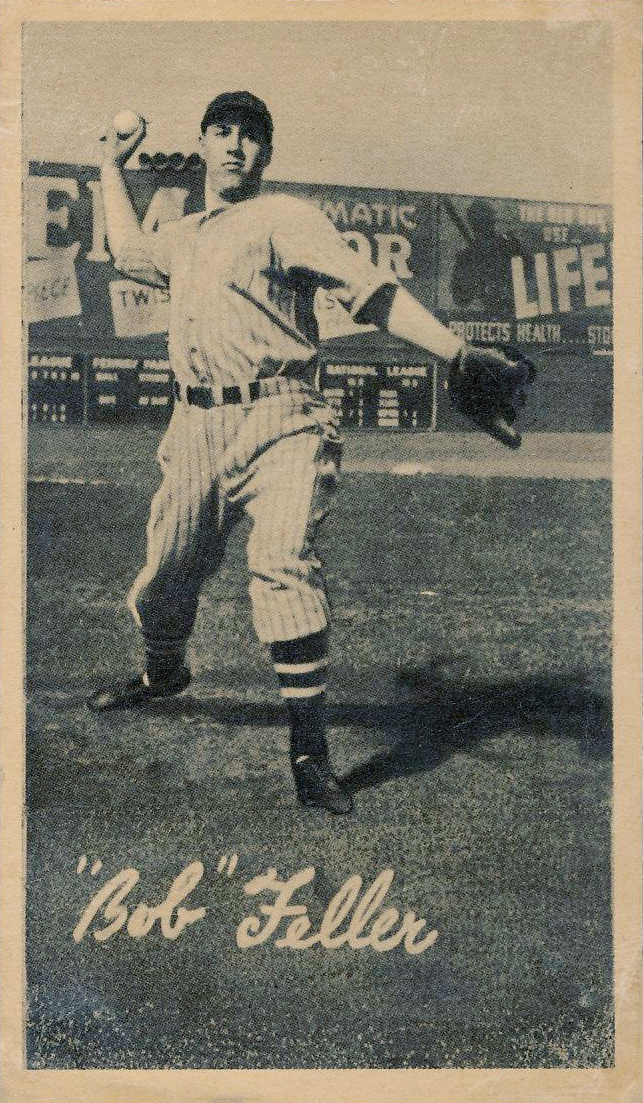
1936 Goudey Feller baseball card

In 1936, Feller was signed by Cy Slapnicka, a scout for the Indians, for one dollar and an autographed baseball. While scouting Feller, Slapnicka said,

This was a kid pitcher I had to get. I knew he was something special. His fastball was fast and fuzzy; it didn't go in a straight line; it would wiggle and shoot around. I didn't know then that he was smart and had the heart of a lion, but I knew that I was looking at an arm the likes of which you see only once in a lifetime.

Feller was assigned to the Fargo-Moorhead Twins and was to report there after finishing the high school semester.

Slapnicka was later named general manager of the Indians and transferred Feller's contract from Fargo-Moorhead to the New Orleans Pelicans. He was planning to add Feller, along with outfielder Tommy Henrich, to the major league roster after a few exhibition and semi-pro games, without either playing for a farm club. By doing so, the Indians would be in violation of Major League Baseball's rule stating that, at the time, only minor league teams could sign amateur baseball players to contracts.

After a three-month investigation, concluding in December 1936, about whether the Indians broke any Major League Baseball rules by signing Feller, Commissioner Kenesaw Mountain Landis disagreed with the argument presented by Slapnicka and Indians president Alva Bradley, but awarded both Feller and Henrich free agency and required the club to pay a $7,500 fine, equivalent to $170,000 in 2025. Landis made the decision partly due to the testimony of Feller and his father, who wanted his son to play for Cleveland and who had also told Landis he would take the issue to court. Feller elected to remain with the Indians but Henrich joined the New York Yankees. Sports columnist Joe Williams wrote, "For $7500 the Cleveland Indians received $500,000 [equivalent to $11,600,000 in 2025] worth of publicity. ... I feel pretty sure Mr. Alva Bradley, president of the Indians, will admit this is the cheapest investment he ever made in publicity."

Feller joined the Indians and made his Major League debut on July 19, 1936, in a relief appearance against the Washington Senators. A month later on August 23, Feller made his first career start against the St. Louis Browns. Indians manager Steve O'Neill had Denny Galehouse warmed up in the bullpen in case the 17-year-old Feller had early troubles, but he struck out all three batters he faced in the first inning, and recorded 15 strikeouts in earning his first career win. His strikeout total was the highest for a (starting) pitching debut. Three weeks later, he struck out 17 batters, tying a single-game strikeout record previously set by Dizzy Dean, in a win over the Philadelphia Athletics. He finished the season with a 5–3 record, having appeared in 14 games; he had 47 walks and 76 strikeouts in 62 innings. Feller's fame reached such a level that when he returned to Van Meter for his senior year of high school, the governor of Iowa greeted him. His record-setting rookie year made him, according to baseball writer Richard Goldstein, "the best-known young person in America, with the possible exception of Shirley Temple." Feller's entrance to the big leagues was later described:

It is difficult to imagine now what a marvel Feller was when he burst upon the scene in 1936, a callow youth of 17. Many athletes are great. Bob Feller was seminal. In the long-ago time, unlike nowadays, it was unheard of for teenagers to succeed in the big top of athletics. Children politely waited their turn in the sunshine. Perhaps in all the world only Sonja Henie had previously excelled at so young an age in any sport that mattered, and, after all, she was but a little girl wearing tights and fur trim, performing dainty figure eights. Feller dressed in the uniform of the major league Cleveland Indians, striking out – fanning! – American demigods ... in the only professional team sport that mattered then in the United States.

— Frank Deford, Sports Illustrated, August 2005

As the 1937 season began, Feller appeared on the cover of the April 19, 1937, issue of Time magazine. In his first appearance of the season on April 24, Feller suffered an injury to his elbow while throwing a curveball. He spent April and May healing the arm, and in May graduated from high school; the ceremony aired nationally on NBC Radio. In mid-May, the Indians considered ending Feller's season early. "We're not taking any chances on that arm and we're not going to allow him to pitch again until the last trace of soreness has disappeared", said Slapnicka. On May 18, Feller appeared in his first game since April 24 but did not record an out. He did not pitch again until June 22, when he recorded two innings, then returned to normal pitching duties on July 4.

On October 2, 1938, Feller was the starting pitcher of a season-ending double-header against the Detroit Tigers. Detroit's Hank Greenberg was two home runs short of Babe Ruth's then-single-season record of 60 home runs. By the ninth inning, Feller had recorded 16 strikeouts, one fewer than the MLB record in a nine-inning game. He tied the record when he struck out Detroit's Pete Fox and, when he struck out Chet Laabs for the fifth time that day, broke the record, to set the modern major league record of 18. Greenberg went 1–4 with a double, then 3–3 in the nightcap, all singles. He later said of the game, "Feller's curve was jumping wickedly and with that and his fast ball, he was murder." Feller did not earn a win, however, as the Indians lost, 4–1. "It was one of those days when everything feels perfect, your arm, your coordination, your concentration, everything. There was drama in the air because of Greenberg's attempt to break Ruth's record, and the excitement grew even greater when my strikeouts started to add up", Feller said. For the 1938 season, Feller led all pitchers with 208 walks and 240 strikeouts.

In 1939, Feller received his first career Opening Day start, against the Tigers, after a match against the Browns was rained out. He won the game 5–1, allowing three hits. On Mother's Day, Feller pitched against the Chicago White Sox with his family in attendance. One pitch was fouled off by Marv Owen into the seats and into the face of Feller's mother; he went on to win the game. Feller finished the 1939 season leading the AL in wins (24), complete games (24) and innings pitched (296 2/3), and led the majors for a second consecutive year in both walks (142) and strikeouts (246).

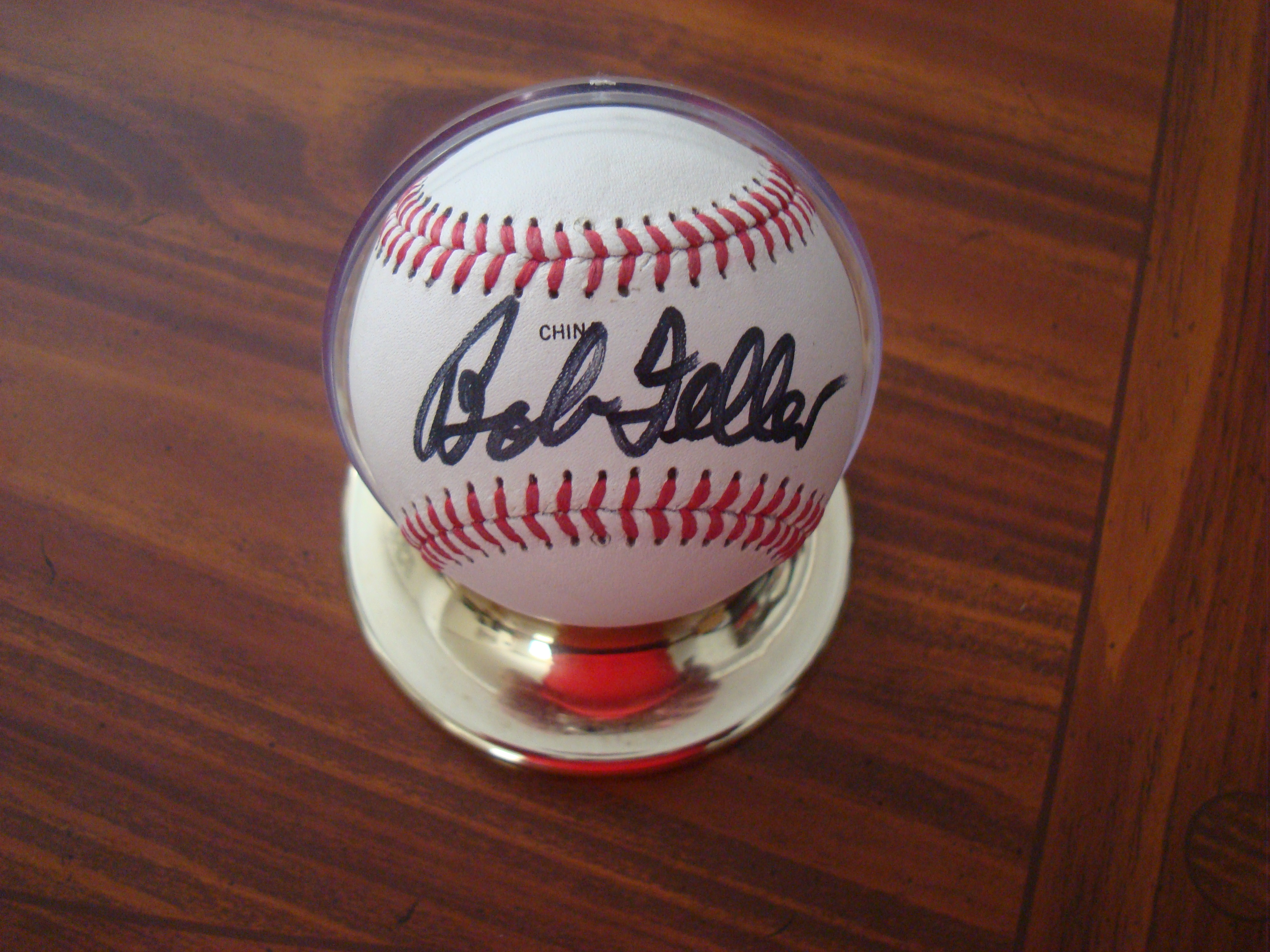
Feller's signature, circa 1992–93

Opening Day of the 1940 season featured a no-hitter from Feller against the Chicago White Sox. Feller was assisted by Indians second baseman Ray Mack when he made a diving play to record the final out. This is the only no-hitter to be thrown on Opening Day in major league history. However, he followed his no-hitter with a six-run, three-inning performance in his next start, in a game against the Detroit Tigers. By the end of the season, he had a 27–11 record, with his win total the best in the majors that season, and a career-high for Feller. He accomplished the pitching triple crown for the 1940 season, as he led the AL in ERA (2.61), wins (27) and strikeouts (261) (the latter two led the entire majors). Feller also led the majors with 31 complete games and 320 1/3 innings pitched, and won the Sporting News Player of the Year Award. Feller later assessed his first few years in the majors: "I relied on the catcher too much. It's swell to have a good catcher calling 'em for you, but the pitcher should take responsibility on his own shoulders."

To publicize Feller's extraordinary pitching speed, the Office of the Commissioner of Baseball commissioned sports film analysis pioneer and former major leaguer Lew Fonseca to pit Feller's fastball against a motorcycle in a "100 mph" speed trial. The test was conducted in Chicago's Lincoln Park, with Feller in street shoes, suit pants, dress shirt, and tie, pitching without a mound on an asphalt roadway. He was required to hit a target 12 inches (300 mm) in diameter from 60 feet 6 inches (18.44 m) away, "as control is as important as speed". The still-accelerating Harley-Davidson passed Feller going 86 mph (138 km/h), yet even with a generous head start the ball beat the bike to the target by several feet. Feller's throw was calculated at the time to have reached 98.6 mph (158.7 km/h), later raised to 104 mph (167 km/h) using updated measuring methods.

Feller again led the majors in wins (25), strikeouts (260), innings pitched (343), and walks (194) for the 1941 season. His six shutouts were an AL-best on the season. That year, Joe DiMaggio talked about Feller's pitching ability, stating "I don't think anyone is ever going to throw a ball faster than he does. And his curveball isn't human." Feller appeared in the May 12, 1941, edition of Life, which said: "... he is unquestionably the idol of several generations of Americans, ranging in age from 7 to 70. They represent every city, town and village in the land, speak of him familiarly as 'Bob', and talk about him by the hour, with enthusiasm."

=== Military service (1941–1945) ===
The United States entered World War II with the attack on Pearl Harbor on December 7, 1941. Feller heard about the bombing while returning from a visit to his terminally ill father at Des Moines to Chicago where he was to sign a new Indians contract. Two days later, he volunteered for the United States Navy, becoming the first American professional athlete to enlist. Originally he tried to enlist as a fighter pilot but failed hearing tests. Feller attended basic training at Norfolk Naval Base and served as a physical fitness instructor there. He also pitched in baseball games hosted by the military. Although he had received a military exemption owing to his father's failing health, he wanted to serve in combat missions. Feller said, "I told them I wanted to ... get into combat; wanted to do something besides standing around handing out balls and bats and making ball fields out of coral reefs." Feller was assigned to USS Alabama; he had hoped to serve on USS Iowa, but it would not be commissioned for another six months after Alabama, joining the fleet February 22, 1943.

Shortly before Feller left for combat, his father died of brain cancer in early January 1943. Five days later, he married Virginia Winther, whom he had met while in Florida for spring training; she was a student at Rollins College. After the marriage, Feller returned to service as Gun Captain aboard Alabama and kept his pitching arm in shape by throwing near a gun turret. Feller and the Alabama crew spent most of 1943 in the British Isles along with USS South Dakota, but in August were reassigned to the Pacific Theater of Operations. Feller's first taste of direct combat was at Operation Galvanic in November 1943. Alabama also served during Operation Flintlock while primarily being used as an escort battleship in 1944. Feller participated in the Battle of the Philippine Sea before his combat duty ended in January 1945; he spent the rest of the war at the Great Lakes Naval Training Station as an instructor.

When the war ended, Feller was discharged as a Chief Petty Officer on August 22, 1945. He was decorated with six campaign ribbons and eight battle stars while serving on missions in both the Pacific and North Atlantic, and was made an honorary member of the Green Berets later in life.

==== Baseball during Naval service (1942, 1945) ====
Feller pitched for the Norfolk Naval Station's Bluejackets baseball team, which went 92–8 in 1942, and later for the Naval Station Great Lakes team.

In 1945, from early spring to late summer, Feller's naval duties were again at Great Lakes Naval station, where he replaced Mickey Cochrane as manager of the baseball program, as well as performed as an active pitcher for the team.

=== Return to Cleveland (1945–1948) ===
Upon arrival in Cleveland after his discharge, Feller was honored with a civic luncheon on August 24, 1945, at the Carter Hotel. Feller said to the thousand-plus crowd: "The real heroes didn't come home." Later that day, the city held a parade and Feller was the starting pitcher in the Indians' game against the Detroit Tigers. Feller allowed four hits in the game and earned a win in the Indians' 4–2 victory. "I was so tired from all the receptions I didn't know if I could finish the game", Feller said. For the 1945 season, he appeared in nine games and notched a 5–3 record with 59 strikeouts and 2.50 ERA.

Before the 1946 season, Feller signed a $37,500 (equivalent to $619,000 in 2025) contract for that year, including a bonus for attendance, as the Indians felt many were attending baseball games primarily to see him; he was offered $100,000 by Jorge Pasquel to play in the Mexican League, but declined to leave the States again. Feller recorded his second career no-hitter on April 30, 1946, against the New York Yankees. He allowed five walks and struck out 11 Yankees. Feller said of the game, "The no-hitter on opening day in Chicago is the one that gets all the attention. But my no-hitter at Yankee Stadium was against a much better team than the White Sox. There was no comparison. I had to pitch to Tommy Henrich, Charlie Keller and Joe DiMaggio in the ninth inning to get the Yankees out." At one point during the season (as he thought he might be nearing Rube Waddell's AL record for strikeouts of 344), Feller claims he confirmed Waddell's total with the AL office. In his last appearance of the season he fanned five Detroit Tigers on September 29 to set what was then believed to be the then-AL single-season strikeout record of 348. Later research into box scores for Waddell's 1904 pitching appearances credited him with five additional strikeouts, moving the mark to 349 and bumping Feller from the top spot. Waddell's tally proved the highest for 62 years, until passed by Sandy Koufax's then-record 382 in 1965.

During the 1946 season Feller registered career-highs in strikeouts (348), games started (42), games pitched (48), shutouts (10), complete games (36), and innings pitched (377 1/3)–– all major league bests that season. Feller finished 26–15 with an ERA of 2.18, the latter a career best. Nearly 20 years later, Feller recalled, "For the 1946 season, though, the Indians were so thin in pitching that [player-manager] Boudreau decided I was to pitch every fourth day, regardless of rainouts, open dates, or anything else."

Feller began 1947 by setting up a barnstorming tour, pitting his own selected team against a Negro league baseball team led by Satchel Paige. Feller's team included Stan Musial and Phil Rizzuto, while Paige's included Buck O'Neil and Hilton Smith. They played in 22 games across the United States, and at the conclusion of the tour, each player had made nearly as much money as the St. Louis Cardinals made as a team for their 1946 World Series win. Against the St. Louis Browns, in Feller's second start of the season, he extended his major league record for one-hitters when he recorded his ninth one-hit game in a shutout win on April 22. In a June 13 game against the Philadelphia Athletics, having already amassed 10 strikeouts through four innings, Feller fell from the mound, which rain had made slippery, and injured his back. "My fastball was never the same after that", Feller said. He ended the season as the AL leader in wins (20) and shutouts (5), and led the majors in strikeouts (196) and innings pitched (299).

=== World Series champion (1948) ===
In 1948, the Indians had one of their finest seasons, though Feller experienced a season that had a considerable number of downs as well as ups. Feller was selected to represent the AL All-Stars for the seventh time in his career in the 1948 All-Star Game, but declined to play, feeling that his performance did not warrant selection as an All-Star. At one point he was winless for a month, and by July 22, his record was 9–12. Lou Boudreau, the Indians' player-manager, declared "we sink or swim with Feller", and continued to pitch him. Feller proceeded to go 10–3 for the remainder of his appearances to finish the season with a record of 19–15, a league-leading 164 strikeouts, and a 3.56 ERA. The Indians won a one-game playoff against the Boston Red Sox to determine the team to represent the AL in the World Series; it was the first time the team had won the pennant since the 1920 season.

Feller started Game One of the 1948 World Series against the NL-champion Boston Braves. In the eighth inning, Feller and Boudreau appeared to have picked off the Braves' Phil Masi as he attempted to steal a base, but umpire Bill Stewart ruled he was safe. Masi scored the only run of the game on a Braves single. Despite surrendering just two hits on 85 pitches for the game, Feller and the Indians lost 1–0. Later, photographs showed that Boudreau had tagged Masi out by two feet. Feller said, "Stewart was the only guy in the park who thought he was safe." Feller was again named the starter in Game Five, which set an attendance record; the 86,288 fans at Municipal Stadium in Cleveland was the then-largest attendance at a baseball game. The Braves put up three runs in the top of the first inning. The Indians came back to tie the game, but by the seventh inning, the Braves regained the lead for good and Feller was removed from the game. He finished having allowed eight hits and seven earned runs. Lemon won Game Six and gave the Indians their second World Series championship. After the Indians returned to Cleveland and were given a victory parade, Feller said, "This is as good as being President."

=== Later years (1949–1956) ===
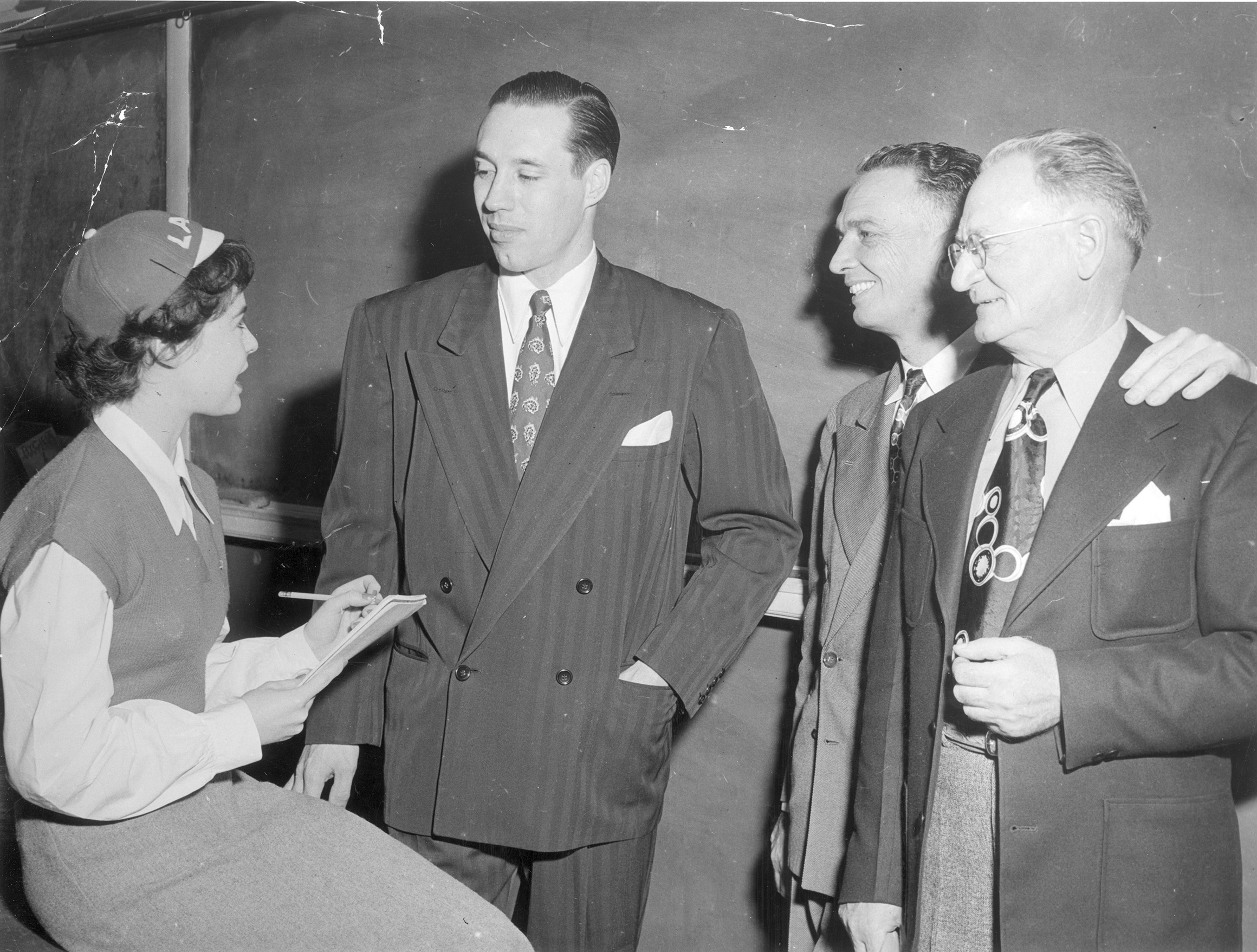
Feller interviewed by the Vivian Luther, editor of the University of Texas campus newspaper, The Shorthorn, in 1950

After taking a pay cut to start the 1949 season, Feller pitched on Opening Day against the St. Louis Browns. During the game, he injured his shoulder and missed the rest of April. His performances were mixed during the rest of the season, and he finished the year with a 15–14 record and a 3.75 ERA. Before the 1950 season, Feller suggested to Indians management he take a pay cut, and did so. Indians general manager Hank Greenberg said, "He himself made the suggestion. In fact, he offered to take more than the 25 per cent maximum pay cut allowed. There was absolutely nothing to it. We all agreed quickly on the figure after Bob showed up yesterday." In a win over the Detroit Tigers in the second game of a doubleheader, Feller became the 53rd pitcher to win 200 games. Throughout the year, players noted that his velocity had returned, and, winning games with finesse rather than power, he was again effective. He finished the year with 16 wins and a 3.43 ERA.

On July 1, 1951, Feller recorded his third career no-hitter against the Detroit Tigers. "I was depending on my slider and I didn't begin to think of a no-hitter until about the seventh inning. I tried to keep it in the back of my mind, bearing down and concentrating on one hitter at a time", Feller said. Feller was the third pitcher, after Larry Corcoran and Cy Young, to record three career no-hitters. He became the first pitcher of the 1951 season to reach 20 wins after he pitched a shutout against the Washington Senators on August 21. Along with Early Wynn and Mike Garcia, Feller reached the 20-win mark during the season; they were the first trio of pitchers on the same staff to earn 20 wins since 1931. The Cleveland starting rotation was so strong that future Hall of Famer Bob Lemon's 17 wins was the only time in an eight-year stretch he didn't win 20.

Feller went 22–8 in 1951, leading the AL both in wins and with a .733 win percentage. He was named the Sporting News Pitcher of the Year.

Feller started the 1952 season with three wins in his first five starts; one of the losses was an April 23 one-hitter against Bob Cain, who also allowed only one hit. Feller struggled for the rest of the season, and after an argument with an umpire over a strike call in late August, manager Al López shut Feller down for the season, finishing 9–13 and a 4.74 ERA. He improved the following year, winning 10 games and losing 7 in 25 starts after Lopez gave him extra days of rest between appearances. The Indians won 111 regular-season games during 1954, breaking an AL record previously held by the 1927 New York Yankees. The 35-year-old Feller finished 13–3 on the year, earning his 250th pitching victory in a May 23 win and his 2,500th career strikeout in a win on June 12.

The Indians played against the New York Giants in the 1954 World Series, getting swept in four games. Unlike the 1948 Series, Feller did not make an appearance. Indians manager Al López said of not starting Feller,

I know Feller wanted to start one of the games in the 1954 World Series (when the Indians were swept by the New York Giants), though we never really talked about it ... If we had won the first or second game in New York, I was going to start Feller in Cleveland in the fourth game. But when we didn't (win either game in New York), why in the hell was I going to pitch Feller? He was the fifth starter on the club at that time, and wasn't the Feller he'd been (earlier in his career).

In 1955, Feller spent part of the season as a starter, then was moved to the bullpen later in the season. He went 4–4 in 25 appearances. During the off-season, he became chairman of the Ohio March of Dimes and served as player representative for the American League. He worked with National League representative Robin Roberts throughout the off-season, discussing the possibility of player arbitration and pensions with baseball owners; he then became president of the Major League Baseball Players' Association.

In the 1956 season, Feller started four games and appeared in 15 others, and finished with an 0–4 record and career-worst 4.97 ERA. The Indians held "Bob Feller Night" on September 9, and he appeared in his last major league game on September 30. After the season, speculation mounted regarding whether Feller would retire as a player. In December 1956, Feller told The Plain Dealer: "I will return to Cleveland later this week and plan to confer with Hank Greenberg before Christmas. I hope to reach a decision at that time." Greenberg had also offered Feller his release or a job with the Indians in their front office. Greenberg said, "We sincerely want Feller to remain with us. As far as I'm concerned, there will always be a job waiting for Bob in the Cleveland organization." On December 28, Feller officially retired from the Indians as a player to continue his work selling insurance. Announcing his retirement, Feller said, "I could have gone with a couple other ball clubs, but anything I might have done with them would have taken the edge off the success I have had with the Cleveland club the last 20 years." He continued, "What if I did pitch another year, so what? I would have to come to the decision I am making now, some time."

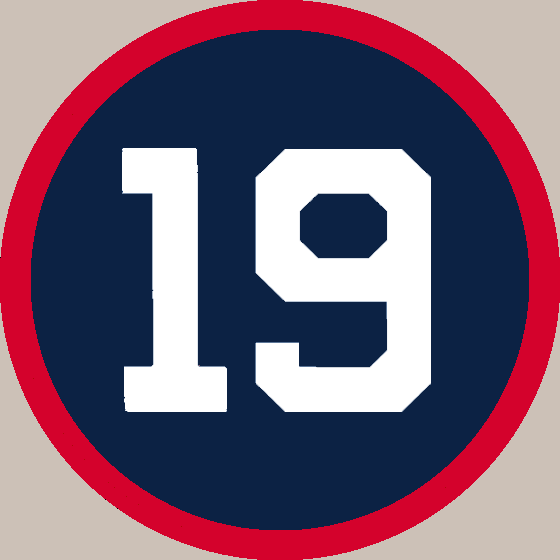
Bob Feller's number 19 was retired by the Cleveland Indians in 1956.

He spent his entire career of 18 seasons with the Indians, being one of "The Big Four" in the Indians' pitching rotation in the 1950s, along with Bob Lemon, Early Wynn and Mike Garcia. Feller shares the Major League record of 12 one-hitters with Nolan Ryan, and was the first pitcher to win 20 or more games before the age of 21. He ended his career with 266 wins, 2,581 strikeouts and 279 complete games. Over the course of his career, he led the AL in strikeouts seven times and walks four times. Upon his retirement, Feller was number three all-time in strikeouts, behind only Walter Johnson and Cy Young, and held the major league record for most walks in a career (1,764), and holds the 20th-century record for most walks in a season (208 in 1938). The Indians retired his jersey number, 19, on December 27, 1956.

As a hitter, Feller posted a .151 batting average (193-for-1282) with 99 runs, 28 doubles, 13 triples, 8 home runs, 99 RBI and 100 bases on balls. Defensively, he recorded a .963 fielding percentage.

In 1962, Feller was elected to the National Baseball Hall of Fame and Museum, along with Jackie Robinson. Both were the first to be elected on their first ballot appearance since the original induction class of 1936. At the time of his induction, only Ty Cobb (98.2%), Babe Ruth (95.1%), and Honus Wagner (95.1%) had a higher percentage of ballot votes. In 2010, after Feller had been admitted to hospice, a reporter released a story recalling a 2007 interview with an aged Feller where he brought up Feller's candid assessment of Robinson as a ballplayer. "They overhyped Jackie Robinson. He was a good baserunner. He was a fair hitter. He was an average second baseman. He was not as good a ballplayer as Larry Doby. There were a lot of better black ballplayers than Jackie Robinson," said Feller.

== Dispute with Commissioner Chandler ==
Throughout his career, Feller played exhibition games during the off-season, playing in towns unaccustomed to seeing major league ballplayers. His exhibition tours often featured other big leaguers and Negro league players, like Satchel Paige, who was also a teammate of Feller's with the Indians. Other players included Stan Musial, Mickey Vernon, and Jeff Heath. During a barnstorming tour in 1945, Feller pitched against Jackie Robinson after he had been signed by the Brooklyn Dodgers. He told a reporter in Los Angeles that he believed Robinson was too muscle-bound to succeed against pitching in the major leagues, although Robinson recorded two hits off Feller. Players had to notify the Commissioner of Baseball, A.B. "Happy" Chandler, before participating in exhibition games and were not allowed to begin games before the conclusion of the major-league season. Feller wrote to Chandler, challenging the league's limit on the number of games that were allowed to be played and proposing an increase; the Commissioner agreed to Feller's proposal. To minimize travel time, Feller employed airplanes, such as two Douglas DC-3s in 1947, to transport players from town to town. Feller's involvement, as well as that of other major league players, was the subject of meetings between the Commissioner and AL and NL presidents.

In 1947, Feller announced that he would pitch in the Cuban winter league during the off-season, but Commissioner Chandler ruled no major-leaguer could play in Cuba. Feller said he would donate his profits from playing in the Cuban winter league to the American Major League players' pension fund: "I want to prove I'm not going to Cuba for any selfish interest but because there is a principle involved and that is the right of any ball player to work at his chosen profession". Feller also believed it was "grossly unfair" that major leaguers who were U.S. citizens could not play in winter leagues but Latin Americans were permitted. Indians owner and president Bill Veeck said, "I have no comment on Bob's outside activities. I don't know whether they've hurt him or not. But I do know this. The great majority of the people of Cleveland think they've hurt him."

Feller's barnstorming business savvy and endorsement details made him one of the wealthiest players of his time but he claimed his off-season exhibitions and barnstorming were necessary to pay for increased medical expenses for his family. His first wife developed anemia after giving birth to their second child when she was given the wrong type of blood during transfusions; she subsequently became addicted to the prescribed medication for her condition. Feller was trying to make up lost earnings as a result, since he missed out on $125,000 or more in salary when he served in the Navy; he missed more than three major league seasons. Feller's biographer John Sickels suggested:

They were trying to make money, but part of it was also, he felt that the black players weren't necessarily getting a fair chance and that he wanted to sort of showcase it. And seeing those, I think, those exhibition games helped people realize that the Negro league players were just as good as the Major League players.

== Records ==
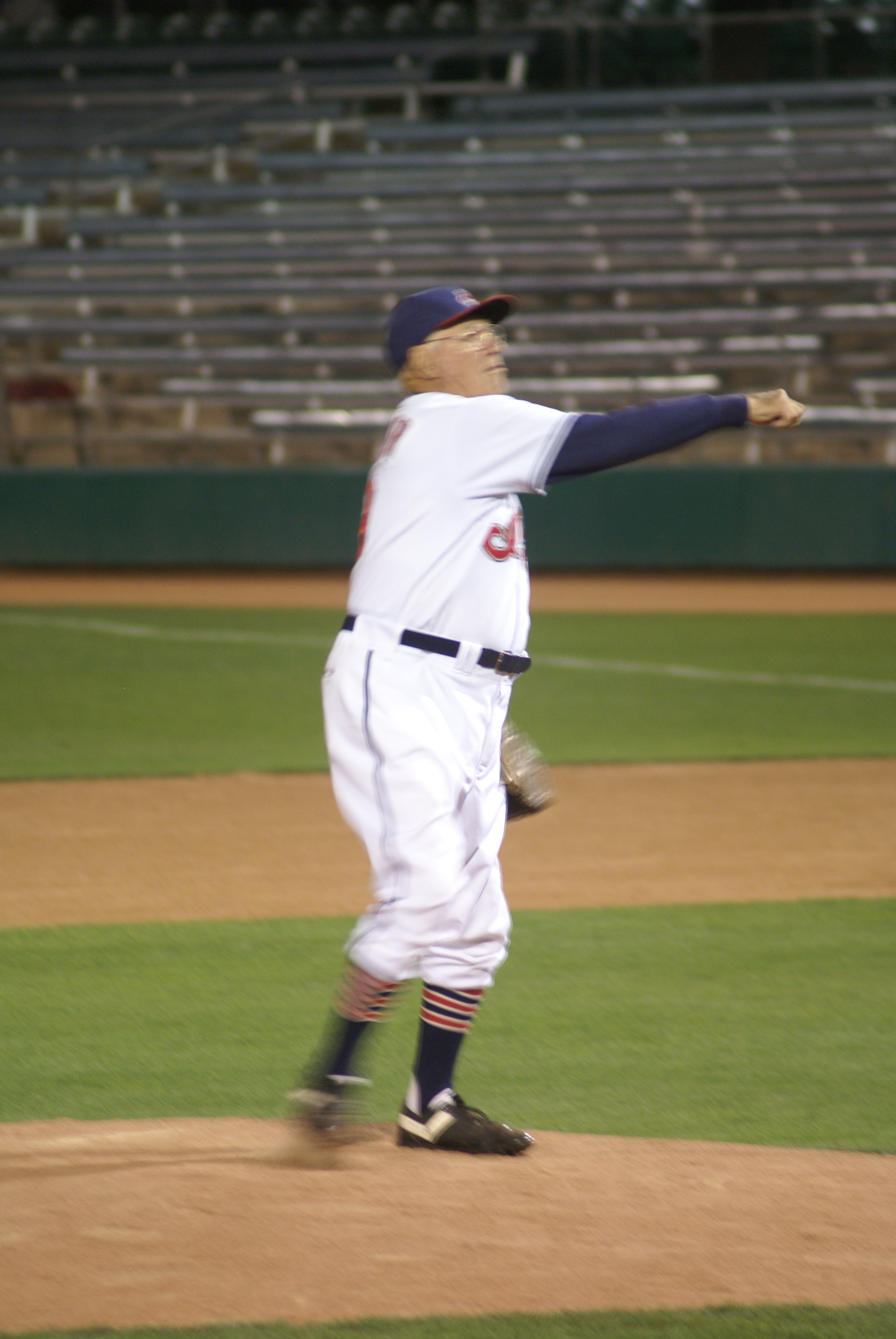
91-year-old Feller in March 2009

Feller, who averaged over 25 wins for the three seasons preceding his military service and won 26 his first year out, estimated that the nearly four years he missed while in the U.S. Navy cost him at least 100 career wins. Given his proven performance on both sides of his hitch it is likely that Feller would have finished his career with more than 350 wins and perhaps 3,800 strikeouts. The always plain-speaking Feller said, "I know in my heart I would have ended up a lot closer to 400 than 300 if I hadn't spent four seasons in the Navy. But don't take that as a complaint. I'm happy I got home in one piece."

There are numerous claims of how fast Feller could actually throw a ball. Best estimates are at least 98 mph and quite possibly several miles an hour over 100 mph. Among them is footage of a Feller fastball being clocked by Army ordnance equipment (used to measure artillery shell velocity) and registering at 98.6 mph (158.7 km/h). With primitive equipment, Feller was at one point measured at 105 mph (169 km/h). Feller once mentioned that he was clocked at 104 mph (167 km/h) at Lincoln Park in Chicago. He also is credited with throwing the second fastest pitch ever officially recorded, at 107.6 mph (173.2 km/h), in a game in 1946 at Griffith Stadium. Feller said a 1974 test involving Nolan Ryan would be evaluated when he threw the ball rather than when it reached home plate, and as columnist Milton Richman wrote, Feller said "Sandy Koufax had the best live fast ball he ever saw."

Although subjective, an extremely telling assessment of just how hard Feller was to hit – even for a left-handed hitter, who had an advantage compared to right-handers – was the tribute from Ted Williams, regarded by many as the greatest hitter in baseball history. He confessed,

Three days before he pitched I would start thinking about Robert Feller, Bob Feller. I'd sit in my room thinking about him all the time. God I loved it ... Allie Reynolds of the Yankees was tough, and I might think about him for 24 hours before a game, but Robert Feller: I'd think about him for three days.

Feller was ranked 36th on The Sporting News's list of the 100 Greatest Baseball Players and also the publication's "greatest pitcher of his time" as well as a finalist for the Major League Baseball All-Century Team in 1999. Each year, American Legion Baseball presents the "Bob Feller Pitching Award" to the pitcher "with the most strikeouts in regional and national competition."

== Later life ==
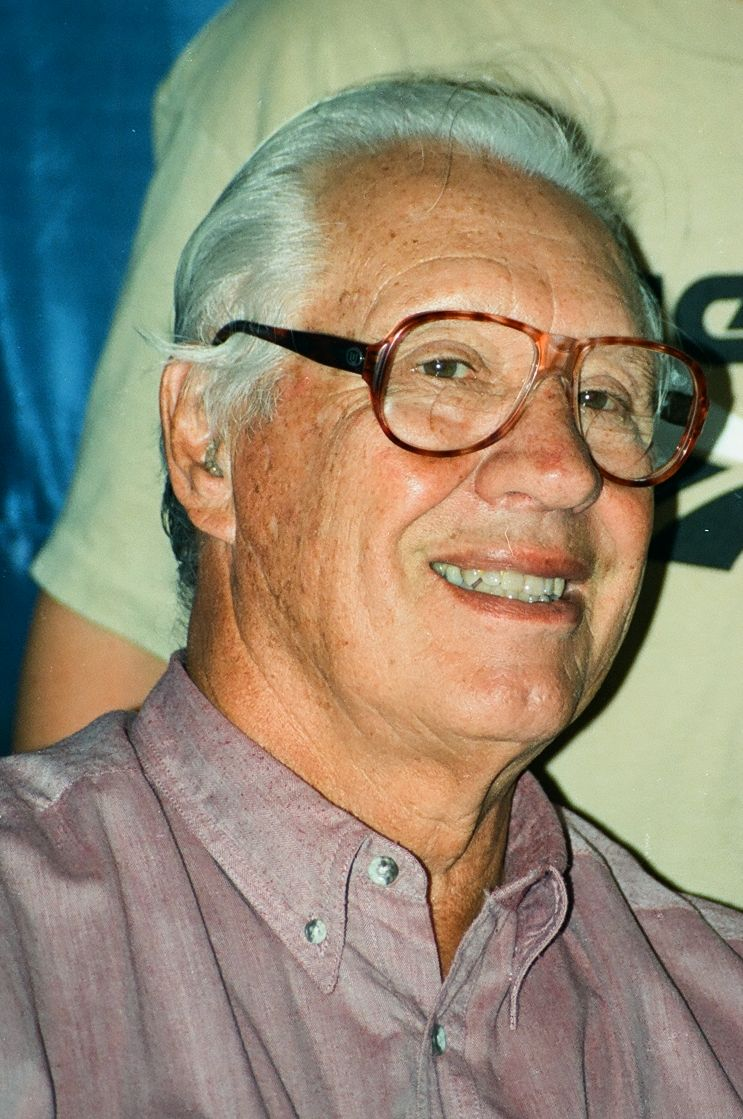
Feller in 1996

Feller was elected the inaugural president of the Major League Baseball Players' Association in 1956. As president, he appeared before Congress to speak about baseball's reserve clause. Feller was the first player to get a franchise to agree to a share of game receipts when he was the starting pitcher for Indians' games. He was also the earliest player to incorporate himself (as Ro-Fel, Inc.). He was also one of the first players to work for the right of a player to enter free agency.

Feller and his wife, Virginia Winther, had three sons, Steve, Martin, and Bruce. The couple divorced in 1971; from the divorce settlement, Virginia received the house she and Feller had built. Virginia died on May 6, 1981, in her home in Shaker Heights, Ohio. In retirement, Feller lived with his second wife, Anne (née Thorpe), in Gates Mills, a suburb of Cleveland.

Feller is credited with being the first baseball star to sign autographs at baseball memorabilia conventions, and was such a frequent guest at such events that one ESPN writer speculated that he had signed more autographs than any other person.

In 1990, Feller received the Golden Plate Award of the American Academy of Achievement. In June 2009, at the age of 90, Feller was one of the starting pitchers at the inaugural Baseball Hall of Fame Classic, which replaced the Hall of Fame Game at Cooperstown, New York. Feller was treated for leukemia in August 2010. By October, Feller was fitted with a pacemaker and was diagnosed with pneumonia and thrush, an infection of the mucous membrane lining the mouth and throat. He was transferred on December 8 from the Cleveland Clinic to hospice care. On December 15, Feller died of complications from leukemia at 92.

== Legacy ==
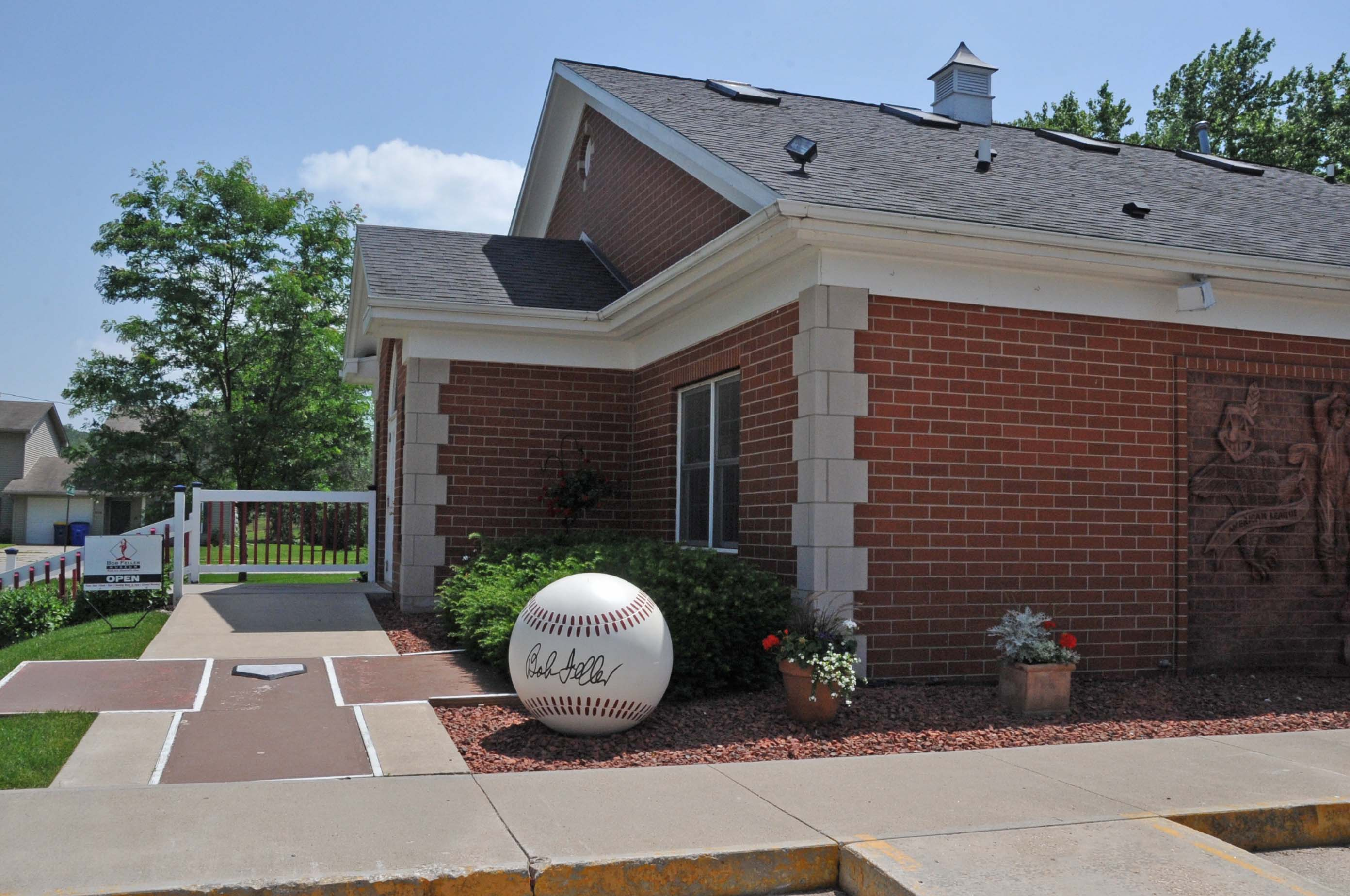
Former Bob Feller Museum in his birthplace, Van Meter, Iowa, today the city hall

Of Feller's death, Mike Hegan, Indians broadcaster and son of former Feller teammate and battery mate Jim Hegan, stated, "The Indians of the 40s and 50s were the face of the city of Cleveland and Bob was the face of the Indians. But, Bob transcended more than that era. In this day of free agency and switching teams, Bob Feller remained loyal to the city and the team for over 70 years. You will likely not see that kind of mutual loyalty and admiration ever again." In 2010, the "Cleveland Indians Man of the Year Award" was renamed the "Bob Feller Man of the Year Award".

On Opening Day of the 2011 season, the Indians invited Feller's widow, Anne, to present a silent first pitch. During pregame introductions, Cleveland players wore a No. 19 jersey in honor of Feller. For the entire 2011 season the players' uniforms were outfitted with an outline of Feller's pitching motion. The organization also made a permanent memorial of the press-box seat that Feller used in later life.

The Bob Feller Museum opened in Feller's birthplace, Van Meter, Iowa, on June 10, 1995. Designed by Feller's son Stephen, on land donated by Brenton Banks, the museum had two rooms that contained Feller memorabilia and items from his own collection. The Feller bat used by Babe Ruth when he made his last public appearance at Yankee Stadium is at the museum. Feller said a teammate had stolen the bat and eventually it was purchased by the Upper Deck sports card company for $107,000. Feller later offered the company $95,000 in return for the bat. Following Feller's death in 2010, the museum faced serious funding issues. In 2015, with family approval, the Bob Feller Museum was donated to the city of Van Meter for use as the city hall. Some artifacts remain on permanent exhibit and can be viewed free of charge.

In 2013, the Bob Feller Act of Valor Award was created to honor the life of Feller. The award recognizes "individuals that possess the values, integrity, and dedication to serving our country that Bob Feller himself displayed."

== See also ==
- DHL Hometown Heroes
- Major League Baseball titles leaders
- Major League Baseball Triple Crown
- List of Major League Baseball annual ERA leaders
- List of Major League Baseball annual strikeout leaders
- List of Major League Baseball annual wins leaders
- List of Major League Baseball career wins leaders
- List of Major League Baseball career strikeout leaders
- List of Major League Baseball no-hitters
- List of Major League Baseball players who spent their entire career with one franchise
- List of Major League Baseball single-game strikeout leaders
- List of baseball players who went directly to Major League Baseball

Awards and achievements
Preceded by Lefty Grove	American League Pitching Triple Crown; 1940	Succeeded by Hal Newhouser
Preceded by Monte Pearson; Ed Head; Cliff Chambers	No-hitter pitcher April 16, 1940; April 30, 1946; July 1, 1951	Succeeded by Tex Carleton; Ewell Blackwell; Allie Reynolds
