= Matthew Leander King =

Matthew Leander King (May 20, 1878 – October 23, 1919) was an American engineer.

== Early life and marriage ==
King was born in Panora, Iowa, the son of Anna Ross (née Caldwell) and John King. He graduated from the Mechanical Engineering Department of Iowa State College in 1906. King was a charter member of the American Society of Agricultural Engineers, a member of the American Society of Testing Materials. He became a member of the American Society of Mechanical Engineers in 1912, and belonged to various aeronautical and officers' clubs. He married Lucy M. Massure, the daughter of Phoebe (Duell) and Richard Henry Lee Massure, on Jan. 1, 1901 in Redfield, Iowa. Their union produced two daughters, Harriet Marie and Helen. Through Helen, he was the maternal grandfather of actor Nick Nolte.

== As an engineer ==
He spent five years as an experimentalist in agricultural engineering with the Agricultural Experiment Station of Iowa State College, Ames, Iowa, during which time he invented the hollow clay tile silo. For two years he was superintendent and general manager of the David M. Bradley Implement Works at Bradley, Illinois. He organized the Iowa Clay Products manufacturers into the Permanent Buildings Society for the development of new designs of and uses for hollow-clay building tile. King designed the Dexter Community House, which utilized the tiles in its construction.

== Military career ==
King entered the army in September, 1917, with the rank of Captain and was assigned to the Aviation School of Aerial Observation at Post Field, Fort Sill, Oklahoma, in charge of maintenance and repair of aeroplanes. He was advanced to the rank of Major in August, 1918, and in November of that year was assigned to Indianapolis as chief engineering officer for aviation in the Northern District. In February 1919, he was made acting director of aviation for the Northern District. In April he was transferred to Washington, D.C., and from there he was assigned on special missions until July when he became flight commander and chief engineering officer of the American Pathfinding and Recruiting Expedition. He was transferred from the Officers' Reserve Corps to the regular army with the rank of Major in October about a week before his death. While at Post Field he learned to fly and was given the classification of Reserve Military Aviator.
