= Robert William Andrew Feller Farmstead =

Historic district in Iowa, United States

- U.S. National Register of Historic Places
- U.S. Historic district
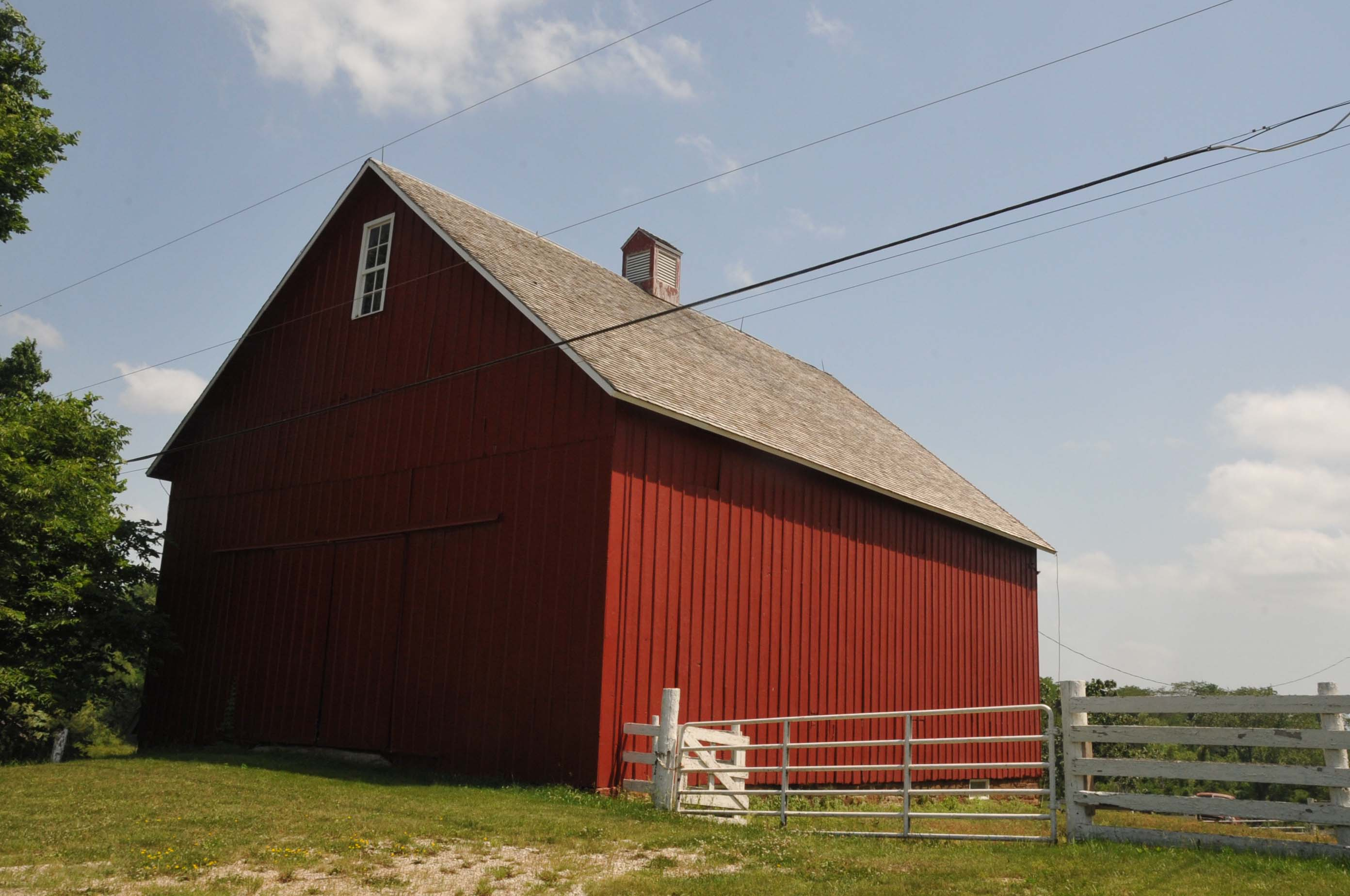

- Location within Iowa Location within the United States
- Location: 29410 340th Trail
- Nearest city: Van Meter, Iowa
- Coordinates: 41°32′45″N 93°54′29″W
- Area: 1.2 acres (0.49 ha)
- Built: 1940
- Architect: John Normilie
- Architectural style: Tudor Revival, timber frame
- NRHP reference No.: 99001570
- Added to NRHP: December 17, 1999

The Robert William Andrew Feller Farmstead is a federally designated historic site a couple miles northeast of Van Meter in Dallas County, Iowa, United States. It is the boyhood home of Major League Baseball Hall of Fame pitcher Bob Feller. The historic district is 1.2 acres (0.49 ha). The Feller family farm was once 350 acres (140 ha) but most of it has been sold to other farmers and the current farm is 40 acres (16 ha). Feller sold the farmstead in 1955 and it is currently owned by Dr. Jose Angel since about 1994.

== Background ==
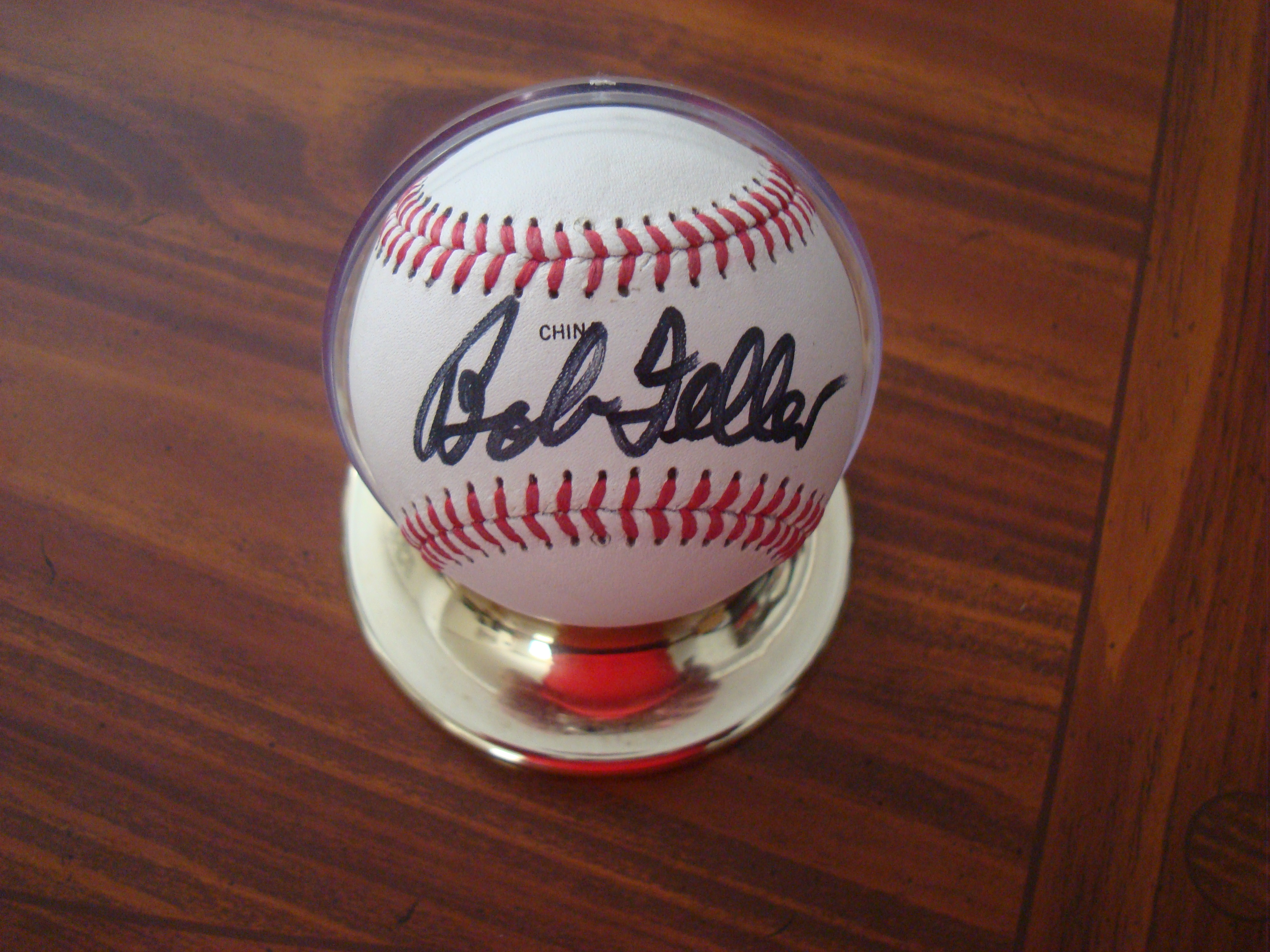
Baseball signed by Bob Feller

The farmstead was first purchased by the Feller family on January 5, 1866, by Feller's grandparents, Andrew and Elizabeth Feller. Andrew had immigrated from Germany and Elizabeth from Switzerland. Feller was born on the farm in November 1918. Feller learned to pitch here on the farmstead from his father William Andrew Feller, known as Bill. When Feller was 8 years old, he threw a baseball so hard it broke three of his father's ribs. In 1932 his father, Bill, built a ballfield one-quarter mile east of the farmhouse; complete with some bleachers and a concession stand. This ballfield has been called the "original Field of Dreams". This ballfield and its homefield baseball team were named Oakview because of all the oak trees in the area. Oakview is no longer part of the farm and has been plowed under and overgrown. Bill Feller even switched his corn fields to wheat because the earlier harvest of wheat allowed his son more time to play baseball. Feller's Major League debut season was 1936, as a 17-year-old, with the Cleveland Indians. The New York Times soon said his name was "on the tongues of a million fans". He then appeared on the cover of Time on April 13, 1937. Feller once stated that if he could relive any moment of his life it would be "Playing catch with my dad between the red barn and the house." The Raccoon River is about one mile south of the property.

== Red barn ==
The farmstead's red barn was built in 1886 by Andrew Feller, Bob's grandfather, and still stands as of 2020.

Feller's proclivity for baseball was first noticed at age five. The place where Bill Feller taught his son Bob to pitch is southwest of the barn and between the barn and house. The pitching rubber is no longer present but the terrain is unaltered and it remains part of the farmstead. During the winter they would practice inside the barn. The barn had wood shingles and board-and-batten siding with a heavy timber frame with pegged joints.

== House ==
The original house was replaced by a brick home that Feller had built during 1939–1940 for his parents, William Andrew and Lena C. Feller, and sister, Marguerite E. Feller Goodson. The architect of the house was John Normile of Des Moines, Iowa. Normile primarily used the Tudor Revival style for the house. Feller paid the then-large sum of $75,000 for the house and it has only had slight modifications since its 1940 completion, except for a breakfast nook and an addition on either side. There are five bedrooms and four bathrooms. Fellers parents lived there until they died, Bill in 1943 of brain cancer and Lena of lung cancer in 1954. There is also a loafing shed on the property that was built in the early 20th century with wooden sides and a metal roof. The new house was built northwest of the old house, which was moved to another site in the region.

== Farmstead ownership history ==
Ownership history
Name	Dates
F. M. and Nettie Leffler	?–1866
Feller family	1866–1955
Ernest and Thelma Canine	1955–1960
Lyle and Janiece Kellar	1960–1963
Ione S. Houston	1963–1965
A. David and MaryAnn Ostren	1965–1976
Phyllis Briley	1976–1994
Dr. José Ángel & Family	1994–present

== See also ==
- National Register of Historic Places listings in Dallas County, Iowa
