= Jones Business College =

- U.S. National Register of Historic Places
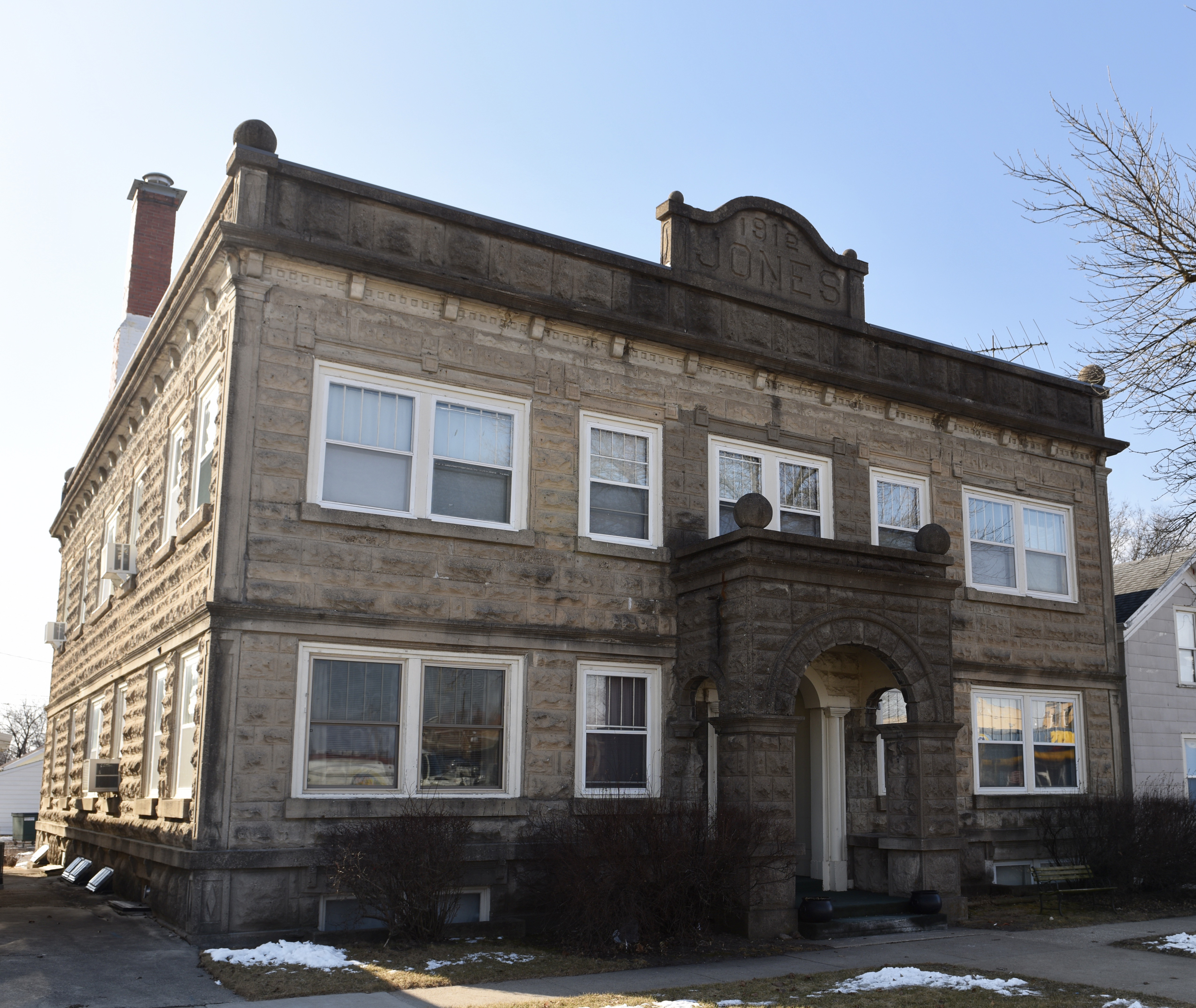

- Location within Iowa Location within the United States
- Location: 1305 Otley Ave. Perry, Iowa
- Coordinates: 41°50′13″N 94°06′12″W
- Area: less than one acre
- Built: 1913
- Architectural style: Late 19th and 20th Century Revivals
- MPS: Downtown Perry, Iowa MPS
- NRHP reference No.: 00001006
- Added to NRHP: November 30, 2000

Jones Business College, also known as the Jones Building, is a historic building located in Perry, Iowa, United States. C. Durant Jones was a social activist who supported the cause of Prohibition. Jones developed and promoted the "Jones Chautauqua System," which was a series of Chautauqua-style productions that promoted the temperance movement across Iowa in the 1910s. He also owned and operated a normal school and a commercial school. All three of these ventures were operated from this building from 1913, when it was built, until 1921. The foundation and walls of this structure are composed of poured concrete, a reaction to the fires that plagued Perry. After its academic and administration use, the building was converted into apartments. It was added to the National Register of Historic Places in 2000.
