= Anthony M. McColl House =

Historic house in Iowa, United States

- U.S. National Register of Historic Places
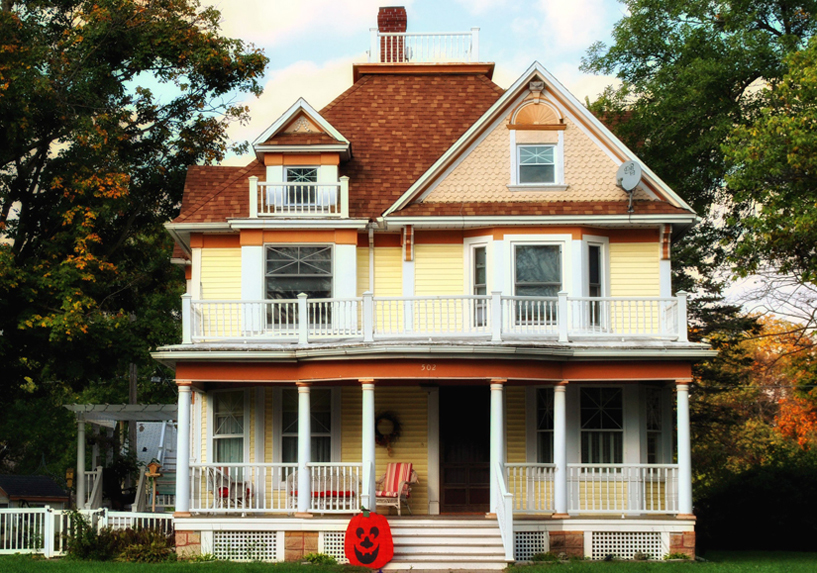

- Location within Iowa Location within the United States
- Location: 502 S. Main St. Woodward, Iowa
- Coordinates: 41°51′12″N 93°55′21″W
- Area: 7 acres (2.8 ha)
- Built: 1904
- Built by: George Bilney
- Architectural style: Queen Anne; Classical Revival
- NRHP reference No.: 87000026
- Added to NRHP: February 5, 1987

The Anthony M. McColl House is a historic dwelling located in Woodward, Iowa, United States. McColl settled in Dallas County, Iowa with his family in 1877. He was a local businessman who served as mayor of Woodward and two terms in the Iowa Senate as a Republican. He resigned his Senate seat to take a seat of the State Board of Control, which he served on for 18 years. He was also board chairman for several terms. While on the board he was able to influence the location of the "Iowa Hospital for Epileptics and School for Feeble Minded" in Woodward. It would later be called the Woodward State Hospital. McColl bought this property in 1900 while he was mayor. He had the house built 1903–1904 at the time he married Bessie Clyde Craft. The two-story frame structure represents the transitional architectural period from the popularity of the Queen Anne style to the Neoclassical. It was listed on the National Register of Historic Places in 1987.
