= Minburn station =

Railway station in Minburn, Iowa, United States

Minburn
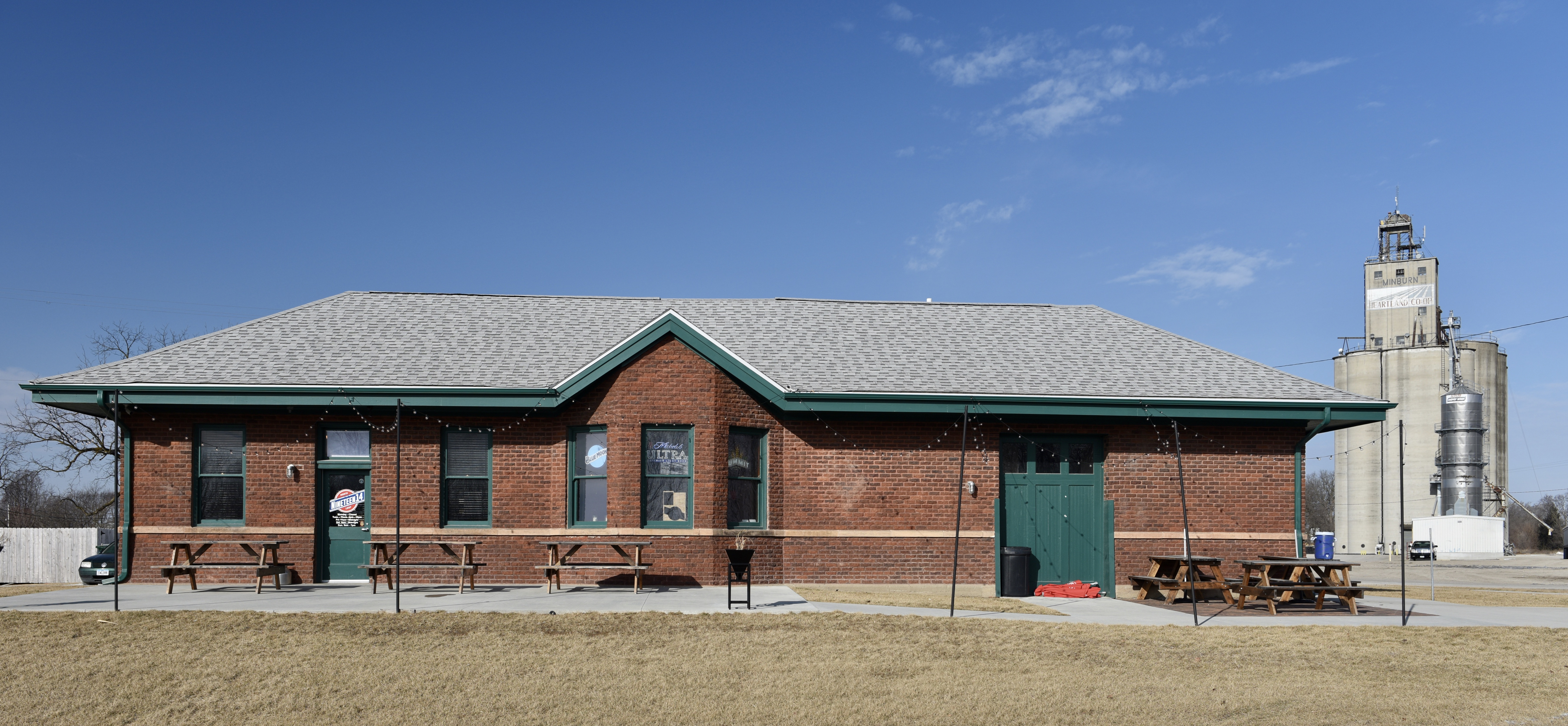
- Minburn station in February 2017.

General information
- Location: 210 4th Street, Minburn, Iowa 50167
- System: Former Milwaukee Road passenger rail station

History
- Opened: 1869
- Closed: April 19, 1959
- Rebuilt: 1914
- Minburn Railroad Depot
- U.S. National Register of Historic Places
- Location within Iowa Location within the United States
- Location: 210 4th St. Minburn, Iowa
- Coordinates: 41°45′18″N 94°01′42″W
- Built: 1914
- NRHP reference No.: 15000863
- Added to NRHP: December 7, 2015
Location

Minburn station is a historic building located in Minburn, Iowa, United States. The Des Moines Valley Railroad laid tracks from Des Moines to Fort Dodge in 1869, and the town was established the same year. A frame building was built for a depot. The Chicago, Rock Island and Pacific Railroad leased the line in the 1890s, and the Minneapolis and St. Louis Railway took over the line in 1906. The old depot was destroyed by fire and this brick structure replaced it in 1914. The last passenger train left the depot on April 19, 1959. The Chicago and North Western Railway acquired the line in 1960, and the last freight train used the depot the following year. A restoration process for the depot began in 2007, and it was relocated a short distance from its original location to a new location along the Raccoon River Valley Trail. It houses a cafe and restrooms for those who use the trail, which is the old railroad right-of-way. The building was listed on the National Register of Historic Places in 2015 as the Minburn Railroad Depot.
