= Perry Carnegie Library Building =

- U.S. National Register of Historic Places
- U.S. Historic district – Contributing property
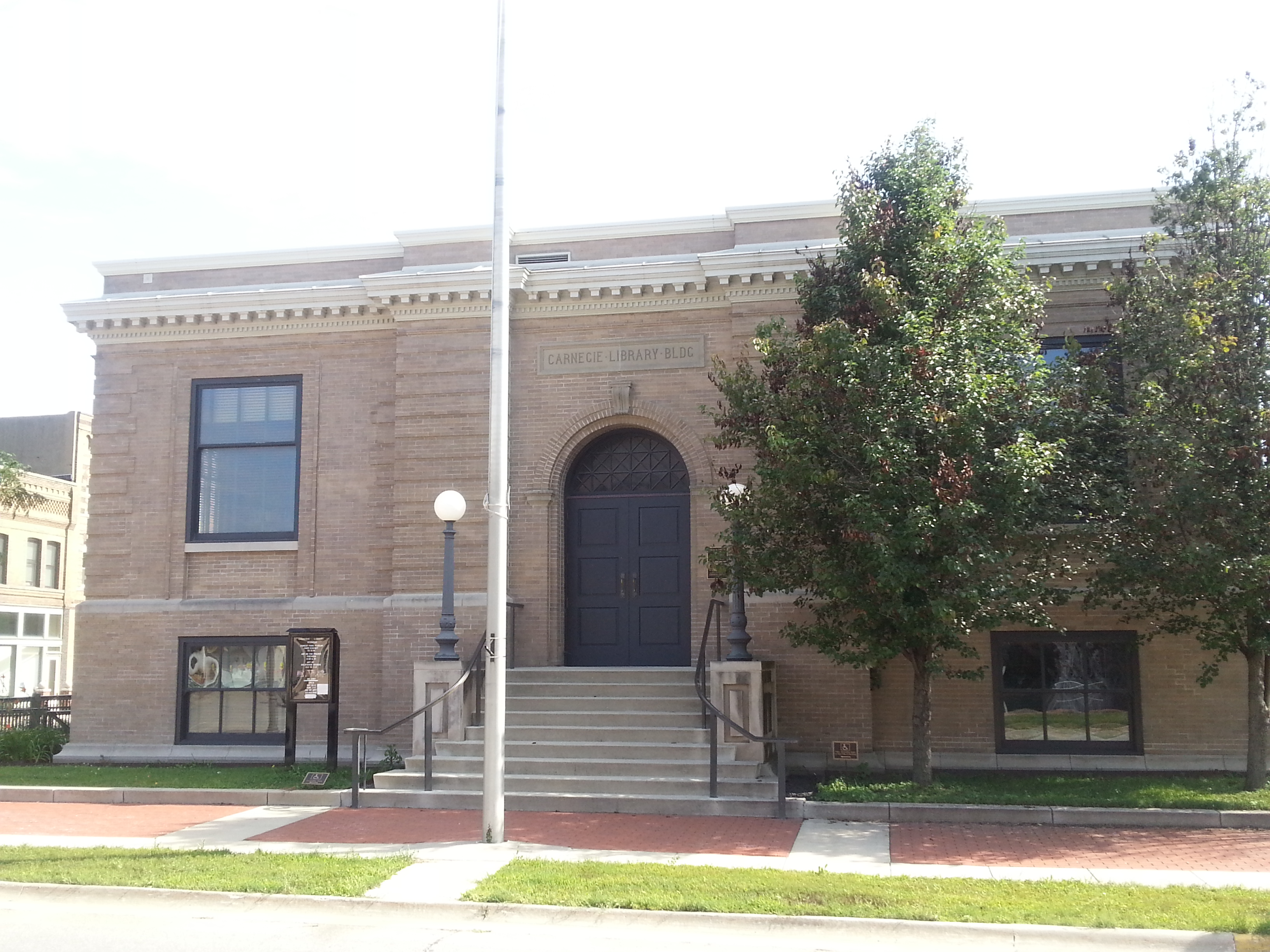
- Entrance to the library

- Location within Iowa Location within the United States
- Location: 1123 Willis Ave. Perry, Iowa
- Coordinates: 41°50′18″N 94°6′18″W
- Area: less than one acre
- Built: 1908
- Built by: Courtney and Bolt
- Architect: Liebbe, Nourse & Rasmussen
- Architectural style: Classical Revival
- Part of: Downtown Perry Historic District (ID00001005)
- MPS: Public Library Buildings in Iowa TR
- NRHP reference No.: 96001061
- Added to NRHP: October 3, 1996

The Perry Carnegie Library Building, also known as the Carnegie Library Museum, is a historic structure located in Perry, Iowa, United States. The Perry Library Association was established in 1894, and William Tarr served as its first librarian. Andrew Carnegie accepted Perry's application for a grant for $10,600 on January 13, 1903. The Des Moines architectural firm of Liebbe, Nourse & Rasmussen designed the Neoclassical building that was built by local contractor Courtney and Bolt. It opened in September 1904 was dedicated on December 10.

The L-shaped building is designed to fit into its triangular lot. The inside of the "L" is filled in and features a rounded outer wall. The building served as a public library for close to 90 years when a new library was built across the street. It was then renovated for use as a library museum. Its collection includes many of the 1,000 original titles from the library, a special collection of Midwest literature, women's fiction, children's books, and books on literacy and libraries. The Carnegie Library Building was listed on the National Register of Historic Places in 1996. It was included as a contributing building in the Downtown Perry Historic District in 2000.
