= Dexter, Iowa =

- City
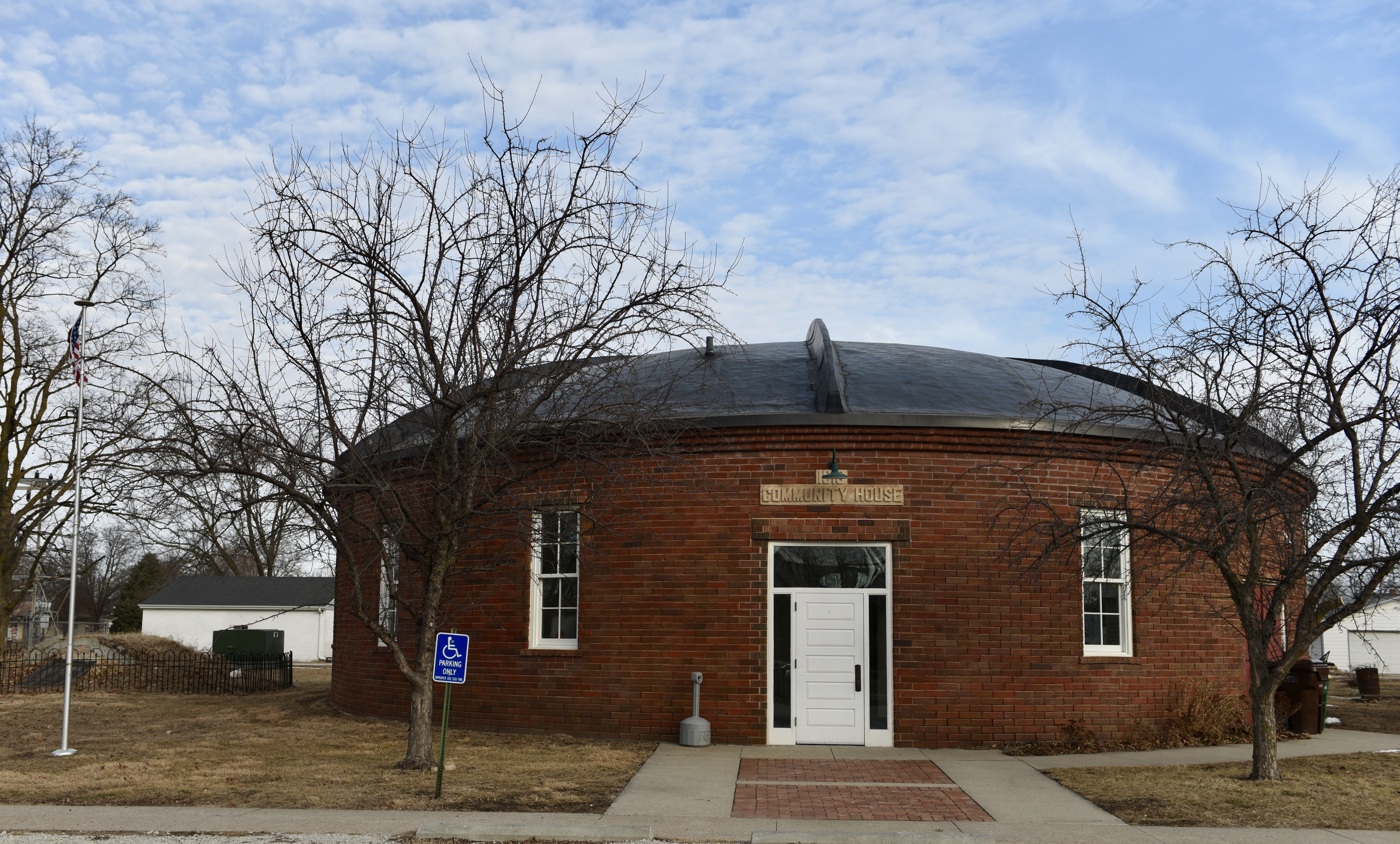
- Dexter Community House

- Location of Dexter, Iowa
- Coordinates: 41°30′55″N 94°13′39″W
- Country: United States
- State: Iowa
- County: Dallas

Area
  - Total: 1.25 sq mi (3.24 km^{2})
  - Land: 1.25 sq mi (3.24 km^{2})
  - Water: 0 sq mi (0.00 km^{2})
- Elevation: 1,148 ft (350 m)

Population (2020)
  - Total: 640
  - Density: 511.2/sq mi (197.38/km^{2})
- Time zone: UTC-6 (Central (CST))
  - Summer (DST): UTC-5 (CDT)
- ZIP code: 50070
- Area code: 515
- FIPS code: 19-21225
- GNIS feature ID: 2394529
- Website: www.dexteria.org

Dexter is a city in Dallas County, Iowa, United States. The population was 640 at the time of the 2020 census. It is part of the Des Moines–West Des Moines Metropolitan Statistical Area.

== History ==
Dexter was founded in 1868.

The city is famous for being the site of a July 23, 1933, shootout between members of the Barrow gang and police from as far away as Des Moines.

On September 18, 1948, Dexter was the site of a national plowing match at which President Harry Truman delivered a speech attacking the 80th Congress for its record in regard to the American farmer. This speech is considered one of the most important of his 1948 Whistle Stop campaign that turned the tide of the election and returned him to the White House.

== Geography ==
According to the United States Census Bureau, the city has a total area of 2.35 square miles (6.09 km^{2}), all land.

The community is immediately north of Interstate 80.

== Demographics ==
Historical populations
Year	Pop.	±%
1880	704	—
1890	607	−13.8%
1900	795	+31.0%
1910	767	−3.5%
1920	790	+3.0%
1930	748	−5.3%
1940	760	+1.6%
1950	643	−15.4%
1960	670	+4.2%
1970	652	−2.7%
1980	678	+4.0%
1990	628	−7.4%
2000	689	+9.7%
2010	611	−11.3%
2020	640	+4.7%
Source:"U.S. Census website". United States Census Bureau. and Iowa Data Center; Source: U.S. Decennial Census

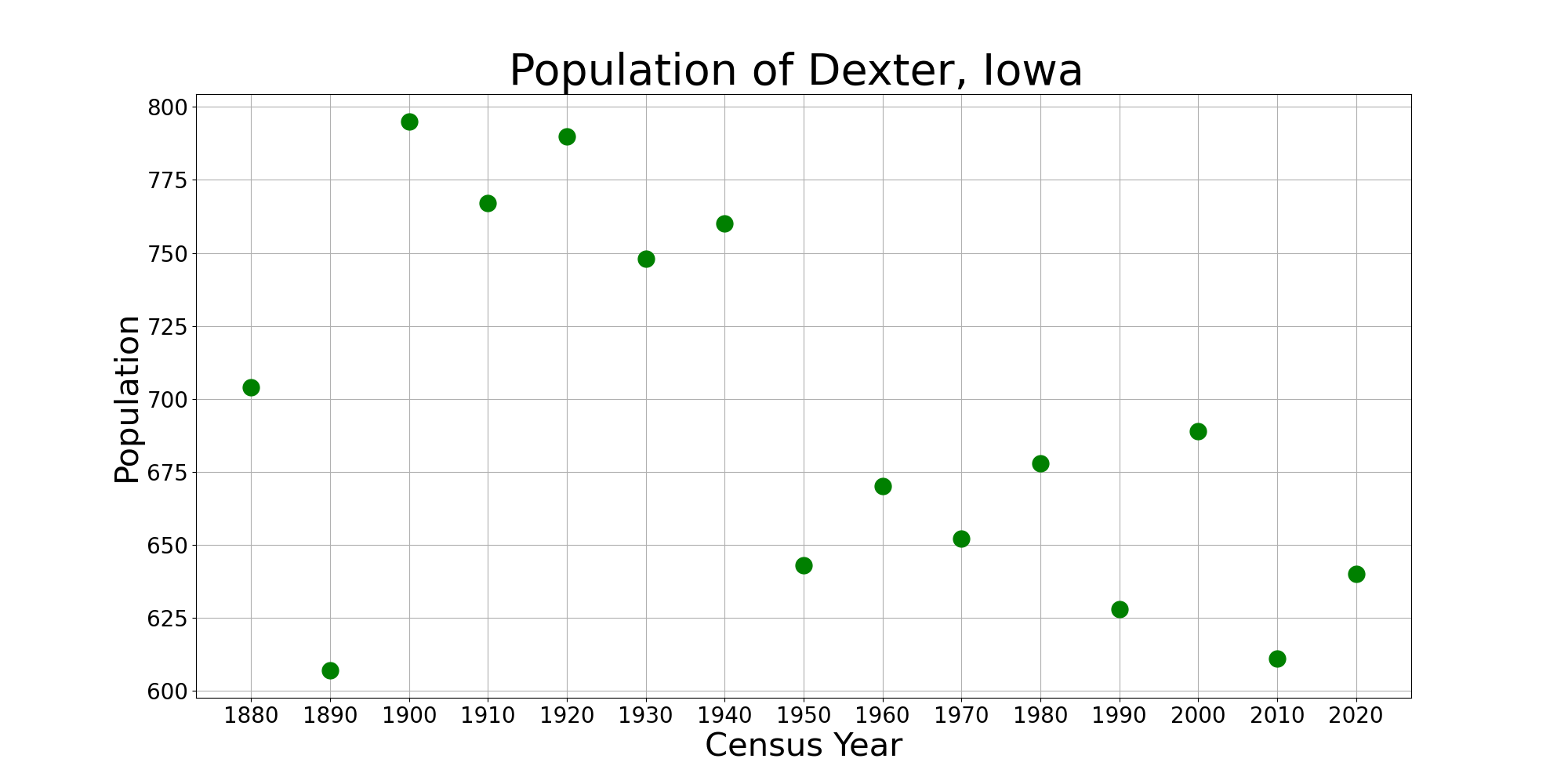
The population of Dexter, Iowa from US census data

=== 2020 census ===
As of the census of 2020, there were 640 people, 254 households, and 164 families residing in the city. The population density was 511.2 inhabitants per square mile (197.4/km^{2}). There were 271 housing units at an average density of 216.5 per square mile (83.6/km^{2}). The racial makeup of the city was 94.1% White, 2.2% Black or African American, 0.0% Native American, 0.9% Asian, 0.0% Pacific Islander, 0.5% from other races and 2.3% from two or more races. Hispanic or Latino persons of any race comprised 2.0% of the population.

Of the 254 households, 37.0% of which had children under the age of 18 living with them, 49.6% were married couples living together, 7.9% were cohabitating couples, 20.9% had a female householder with no spouse or partner present and 21.7% had a male householder with no spouse or partner present. 35.4% of all households were non-families. 31.9% of all households were made up of individuals, 15.4% had someone living alone who was 65 years old or older.

The median age in the city was 35.6 years. 30.9% of the residents were under the age of 20; 3.4% were between the ages of 20 and 24; 29.1% were from 25 and 44; 21.9% were from 45 and 64; and 14.7% were 65 years of age or older. The gender makeup of the city was 50.8% male and 49.2% female.

=== 2010 census ===
As of the census of 2010, there were 611 people, 257 households, and 178 families residing in the city. The population density was 260.0 inhabitants per square mile (100.4/km^{2}). There were 284 housing units at an average density of 120.9 per square mile (46.7/km^{2}). The racial makeup of the city was 98.5% White, 1.1% African American, 0.2% Native American, and 0.2% from two or more races. Hispanic or Latino of any race were 2.8% of the population.

There were 257 households, of which 31.5% had children under the age of 18 living with them, 54.9% were married couples living together, 9.7% had a female householder with no husband present, 4.7% had a male householder with no wife present, and 30.7% were non-families. 25.3% of all households were made up of individuals, and 10.1% had someone living alone who was 65 years of age or older. The average household size was 2.38 and the average family size was 2.85.

The median age in the city was 36.3 years. 24.2% of residents were under the age of 18; 7.7% were between the ages of 18 and 24; 30.5% were from 25 to 44; 24.4% were from 45 to 64; and 13.3% were 65 years of age or older. The gender makeup of the city was 50.7% male and 49.3% female.

=== 2000 census ===
As of the census of 2000, there were 689 people, 259 households, and 190 families residing in the city. The population density was 578.2 inhabitants per square mile (223.2/km^{2}). There were 270 housing units at an average density of 226.6 per square mile (87.5/km^{2}). The racial makeup of the city was 97.82% White, 0.29% Native American, 1.31% Asian, 0.29% from other races, and 0.29% from two or more races. Hispanic or Latino of any race were 1.16% of the population.

There were 259 households, out of which 35.1% had children under the age of 18 living with them, 59.8% were married couples living together, 10.8% had a female householder with no husband present, and 26.3% were non-families. 21.2% of all households were made up of individuals, and 12.0% had someone living alone who was 65 years of age or older. The average household size was 2.66 and the average family size was 3.07.

In the city, the population was spread out, with 28.3% under the age of 18, 5.4% from 18 to 24, 29.3% from 25 to 44, 21.6% from 45 to 64, and 15.4% who were 65 years of age or older. The median age was 36 years. For every 100 females, there were 99.7 males. For every 100 females age 18 and over, there were 96.0 males.

The median income for a household in the city was $39,375, and the median income for a family was $44,861. Males had a median income of $30,395 versus $22,361 for females. The per capita income for the city was $16,990. About 4.3% of families and 4.6% of the population were below the poverty line, including 6.2% of those under age 18 and 7.8% of those age 65 or over.

== Education ==
Dexter is within the West Central Valley Community School District. The district was established on July 1, 2001 by the merger of the Dexfield Community School District and the Stuart-Menlo Community School District.

== Notable persons ==
- Brenna Bird, attorney general of Iowa
- Edwin H. Conger, United States Ambassador to China, Brazil, and Mexico.
