= Dexter Community House =

- U.S. National Register of Historic Places
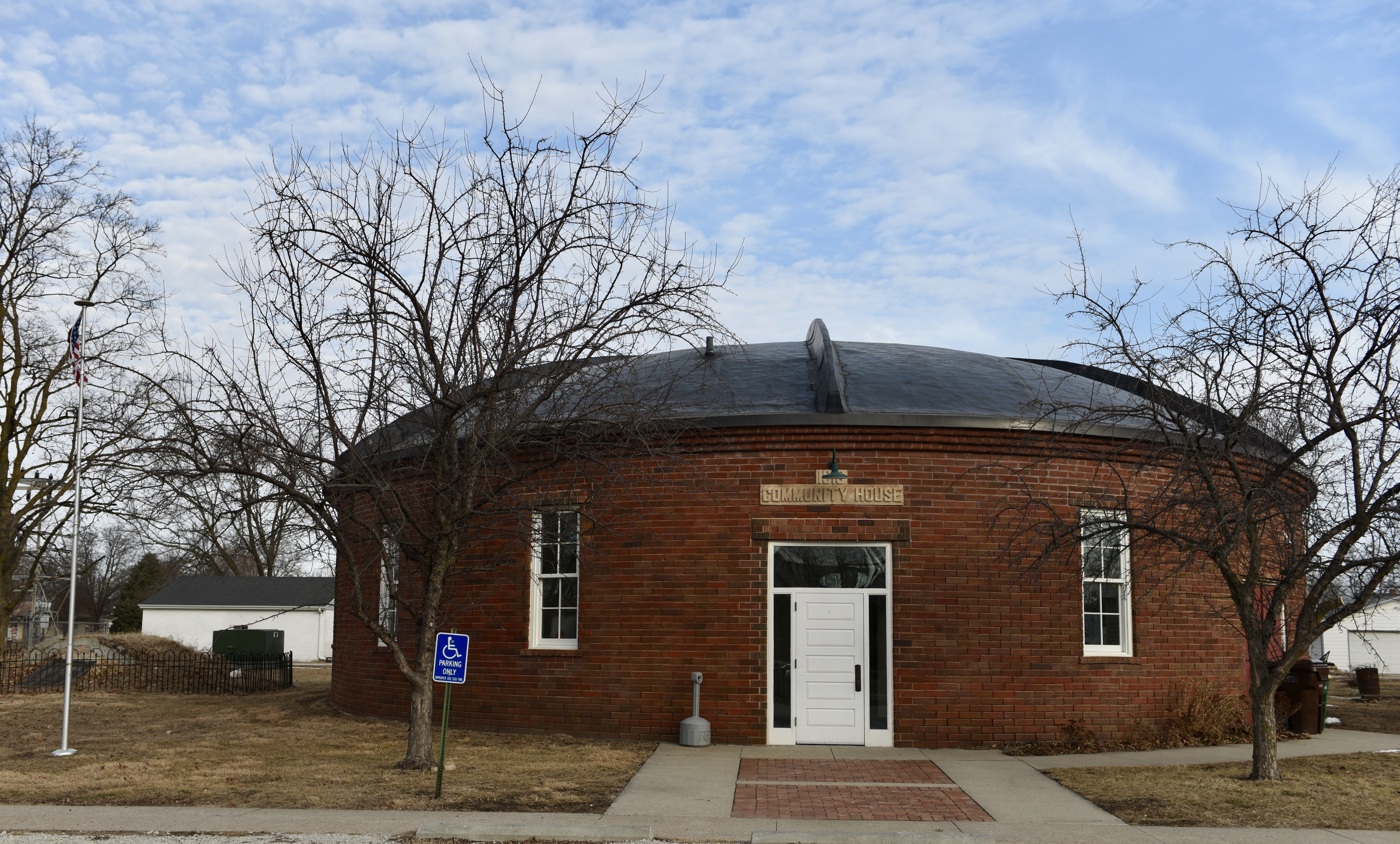

- Location within Iowa Location within the United States
- Location: 707 Dallas St. Dexter, Iowa
- Coordinates: 41°31′02″N 94°13′45″W
- Area: less than one acre
- Built: 1917
- Architect: Major Matt King
- NRHP reference No.: 75000679
- Added to NRHP: March 3, 1975

Dexter Community House, also known as The Roundhouse, is a historic building located in Dexter, Iowa, United States. Several prominent members of the community were responsible for the fundraising and building of this community facility. It replaced an older facility that was used for revival meetings, social and entertainment functions. After $10,000 had been raised Major Matt King drew up the plans for the building, which was completed in 1917. It continues to be used for a variety of community functions, and for a time it was used as a high school gymnasium. The elliptical-shaped building is 145 feet (4,420 cm) in diameter. The exterior is composed of hollow blocks, and they are the support for the dome roof. The interior walls are finished with sandstone. A large stage is located opposite the main entrance. It was added to the National Register of Historic Places in 1975.
