= Adel Public Square Historic District =

Historic district in Iowa, United States

- U.S. National Register of Historic Places
- U.S. Historic district
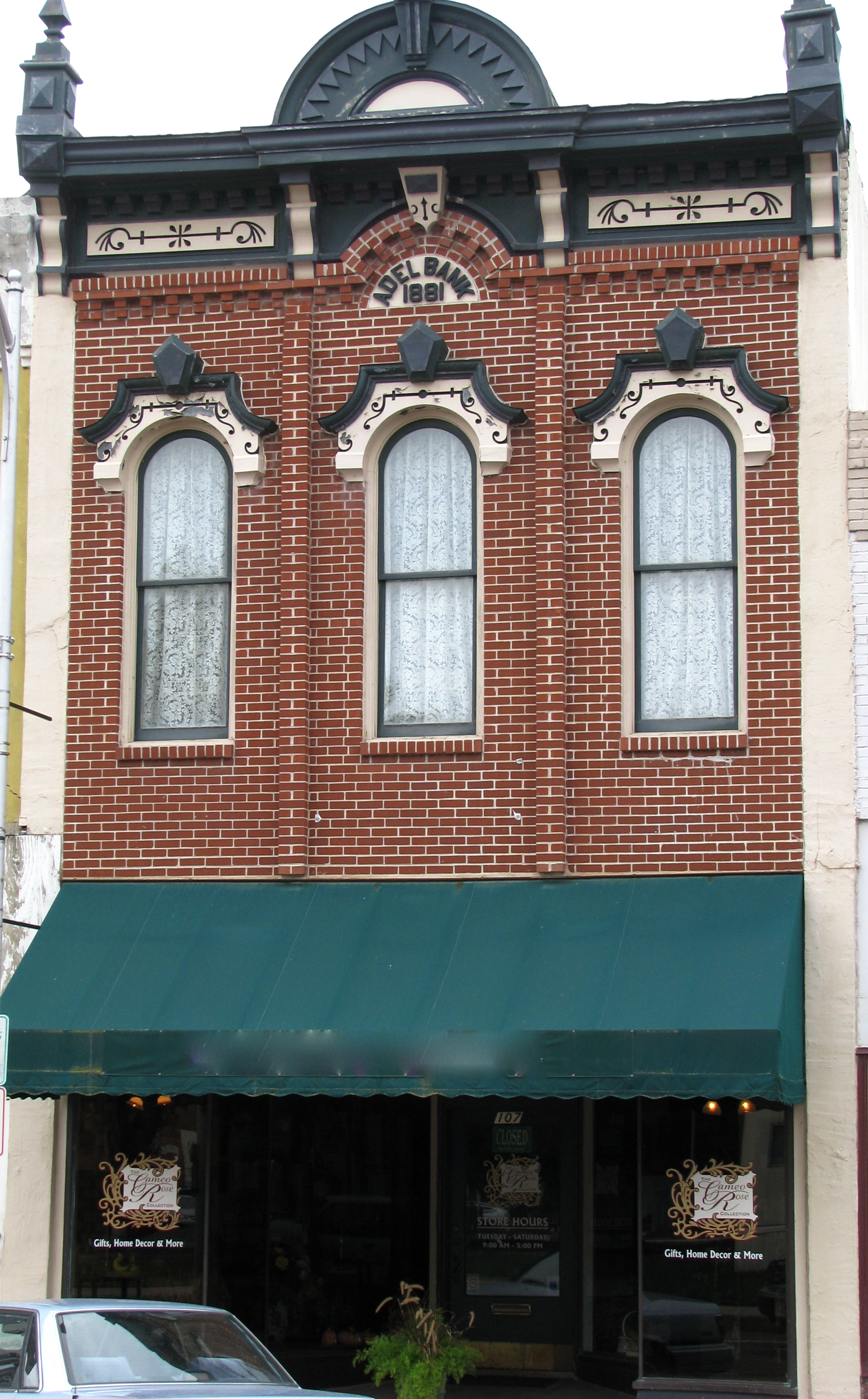

- Location within Iowa Location within the United States
- Interactive map showing the location for Adel Public Square Historic District
- Location: About four blocks in downtown Adel centered on the public square
- Coordinates: 41°37′04″N 94°01′05″W
- Area: 11.44 acres (4.63 ha)
- Architectural style: Late Victorian; Late 19th & early 20th century Revivals
- NRHP reference No.: 09000106
- Added to NRHP: December 18, 2009

The Adel Public Square Historic District, also known as The Square, is a nationally recognized historic district located in Adel, Iowa, United States. It was listed on the National Register of Historic Places in 2009. At the time of its nomination it contained 45 resources, which included 35 contributing buildings, one contributing structure, and nine non-contributing buildings. Adel was platted in 1847 as the county seat for Dallas County. The population of the town expanded in the late 19th and early 20th centuries, and the central business district expanded because of it. It reached its largest size in 1917 with some redevelopment occurring on the east side of the square after World War II.

The historic district contains a mix of commercial buildings, professional offices, automotive and farm equipment related businesses, lodge halls, a single-family dwelling, and hatcheries. Civic buildings include the Dallas County Courthouse (1902) and the former post office. Several buildings have been renovated for use by the county for office space. The network of brick streets is the historic structure in the district. The period of significance is from 1868 to 1959, and the buildings were constructed during that time frame. While wood was the earliest building material used, none of those buildings exist and now most of the buildings are brick with a few concrete structures built after World War II.
