= Dallas County Courthouse (Iowa) =

- U.S. National Register of Historic Places
- U.S. Historic district – Contributing property
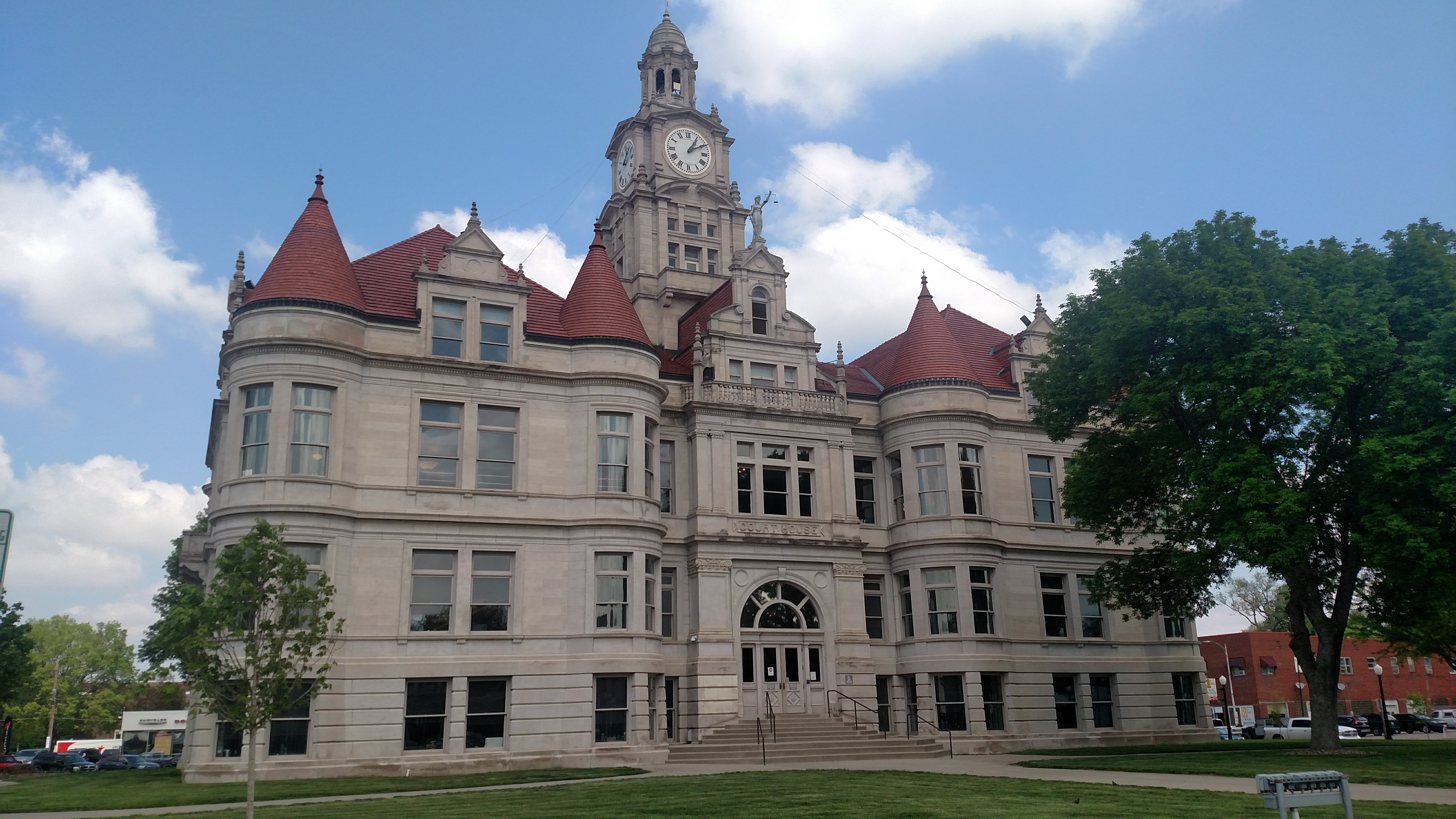
- The Dallas County courthouse in downtown Adel

- Location within Iowa Location within the United States
- Interactive map showing the location for Dallas County Courthouse
- Location: Town Square; Adel, Iowa
- Coordinates: 41°37′4″N 94°1′3″W
- Area: less than one acre
- Built: 1902
- Built by: Rawson and Son
- Architect: W. T. Proudfoot; George Bird
- Architectural style: Late 19th and 20th Century Revivals
- Part of: Adel Public Square Historic District (ID09000106)
- MPS: County Courthouses in Iowa TR
- NRHP reference No.: 73000723
- Added to NRHP: November 26, 1973

The Dallas County Courthouse in Adel, Iowa, United States was built in 1902. It was individually listed on the National Register of Historic Places in 1973, and is a part of the County Courthouses in Iowa Thematic Resource. In 2009 it was included as a contributing property in the Adel Public Square Historic District. The current structure is the fourth building to house court functions and county administration.

== History ==
Dallas County's first courthouse was a double log cabin constructed of cottonwood logs and served the county from 1848-1853. County leaders constructed a second courthouse that was a single-story frame structure that measured 40 by 20 feet (12.2 m × 6.1 m). It served the county for five years when a third facility was constructed. It was a two-story brick structure measuring 64 by 42 feet (20 m × 13 m), and was built for $20,000. The current courthouse was built with $85,000 in funding approved by county voters in 1900. On September 19, 1902, it was dedicated in front of a crowd of more than 2,000 people.

Beginning in the late 1960s or early 1970s, the county acquired properties on the northwest side of the square. Over the years various county offices moved from the courthouse to these buildings. A new sheriff's office and jail was completed in 1990.

A study of the courthouse in 2004 found that the original flooring system and its supports were deteriorating, and the building was closed. After studying the issue, holding hearings, and a referendum, it was decided to remodel the existing building. Keffer/Overton Architects of Des Moines designed the project. The renovation project began in 2005 to deal with the structural issues, restore the rotunda, added a new stairwell and elevator, and it addressed cosmetic concerns such as repainting interior spaces in their original color schemes and installing new light fixtures to match the wrought iron of the Grand Stair Case. The final stage of the project is an $80,000 restoration of the artwork on the ceiling.

== Architecture ==
The courthouse was designed by the prominent Des Moines architectural firm of Proudfoot & Bird. George Bird, who is considered the primary designer, used the Chateau Azay-le-Rideau in Indre-et-Loire, France, as his inspiration. Rawson and Son was the contractor for the project that cost $109,243. The 3½-story structure is constructed of Bedford stone and features a 128-foot (39 m) tower housing a $1,000 clock. Some of the stones weigh 3½ tons. The structure is built on a rusticated stone foundation and capped with a hipped roof. Elements of the French Renaissance style are found in the ornately carved dormers and the round corner towers capped with conical roofs. The entire roof is covered with red tiles.

The courthouse sits in the middle of the landscaped public square. It features walkways, a lawn, trees, benches, floral plantings, and monuments to the United States Armed Forces.
