= Downtown Perry Historic District =

Historic district in Iowa, United States

- U.S. National Register of Historic Places
- U.S. Historic district
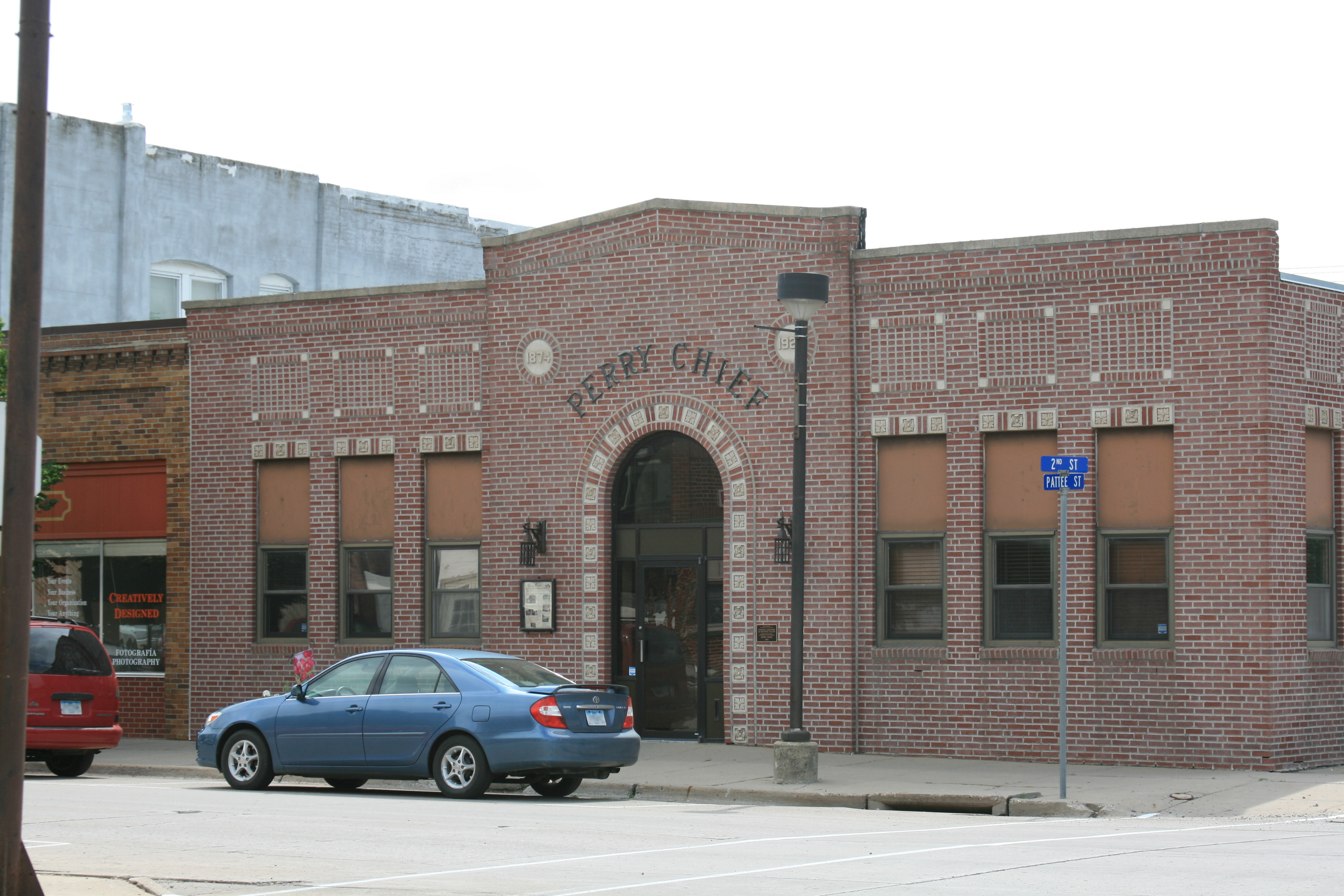

- Location within Iowa Location within the United States
- Location: Between 3rd St., Lucinda St., 1st Ave., and Railroad St., Perry, Iowa
- Coordinates: 41°50′24″N 94°06′14″W
- Area: 3.6 acres (1.5 ha)
- Architectural style: Late Victorian; Late 19th & early 20th century Revivals
- MPS: Downtown Perry, Iowa MPS
- NRHP reference No.: 00001005
- Added to NRHP: September 8, 2000

The Downtown Perry Historic District, also known as Uptown, is a nationally recognized historic district located in Perry, Iowa, United States. It was listed on the National Register of Historic Places in 2000. At the time of its nomination it contained 68 resources, which included 58 contributing buildings, one contributing site, and nine non-contributing buildings. The central business district is divided into three sections: the Triangle, Second Street above Willis Avenue, and South of Otley Avenue. The Triangle is public land where the Perry Carnegie Library Building is located. Second Street above Willis Avenue is a corridor of two-blocks north of the Triangle. It is where most of the professional offices, retail and entertainment businesses are located. The area south of Otley Avenue contains a cluster of businesses that is also located along Second Street for the most part. The businesses are associated with the automobile and light industrial operations. The first two sections are included in the historic district while the third was excluded because of its mixed land use and its lack of historic integrity from alterations and demolition.
