= Minburn, Iowa =

- City
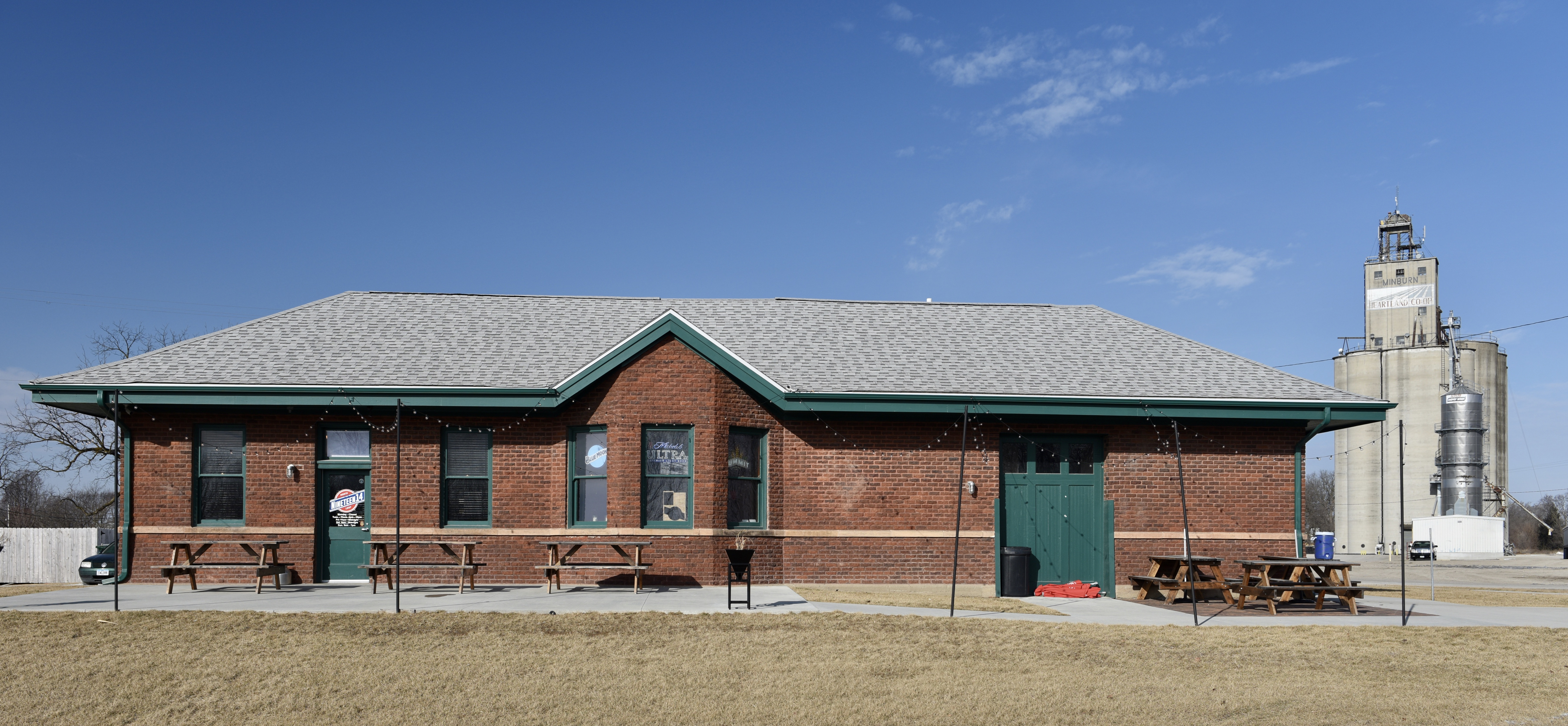
- The former Minburn Railroad Depot

- Location of Minburn, Iowa
- Coordinates: 41°45′27″N 94°01′43″W
- Country: United States
- State: Iowa
- County: Dallas

Area
  - Total: 0.25 sq mi (0.66 km^{2})
  - Land: 0.25 sq mi (0.66 km^{2})
  - Water: 0 sq mi (0.00 km^{2})
- Elevation: 1,040 ft (320 m)

Population (2020)
  - Total: 325
  - Density: 1,274.5/sq mi (492.07/km^{2})
- Time zone: UTC-6 (Central (CST))
  - Summer (DST): UTC-5 (CDT)
- ZIP code: 50167
- Area code: 515
- FIPS code: 19-52545
- GNIS feature ID: 2395339
- Website: http://www.minburn.org/

Minburn is a city in Dallas County, Iowa, United States. The population was 325 at the time of the 2020 census. It is part of the Des Moines–West Des Moines Metropolitan Statistical Area.

== History ==
Minburn was laid out as a town in 1869.

== Geography ==
According to the United States Census Bureau, the city has a total area of 0.28 square miles (0.73 km^{2}), all land.

== Demographics ==
Historical populations
Year	Pop.	±%
1900	317	—
1910	388	+22.4%
1920	418	+7.7%
1930	328	−21.5%
1940	335	+2.1%
1950	353	+5.4%
1960	357	+1.1%
1970	378	+5.9%
1980	390	+3.2%
1990	346	−11.3%
2000	391	+13.0%
2010	365	−6.6%
2020	325	−11.0%
Source:"U.S. Census website". United States Census Bureau. and Iowa Data Center; Source: U.S. Decennial Census

=== 2020 census ===
As of the census of 2020, there were 325 people, 154 households, and 101 families residing in the city. The population density was 1,274.4 inhabitants per square mile (492.1/km^{2}). There were 159 housing units at an average density of 623.5 per square mile (240.7/km^{2}). The racial makeup of the city was 96.9% White, 0.0% Black or African American, 0.0% Native American, 0.0% Asian, 0.0% Pacific Islander, 0.9% from other races and 2.2% from two or more races. Hispanic or Latino persons of any race comprised 2.8% of the population.

Of the 154 households, 33.1% of which had children under the age of 18 living with them, 46.8% were married couples living together, 8.4% were cohabitating couples, 26.0% had a female householder with no spouse or partner present and 18.8% had a male householder with no spouse or partner present. 34.4% of all households were non-families. 28.6% of all households were made up of individuals, 11.7% had someone living alone who was 65 years old or older.

The median age in the city was 41.4 years. 22.5% of the residents were under the age of 20; 4.0% were between the ages of 20 and 24; 28.3% were from 25 and 44; 30.8% were from 45 and 64; and 14.5% were 65 years of age or older. The gender makeup of the city was 51.1% male and 48.9% female.

=== 2010 census ===
As of the census of 2010, there were 365 people, 154 households, and 104 families living in the city. The population density was 1,303.6 inhabitants per square mile (503.3/km^{2}). There were 163 housing units at an average density of 582.1 per square mile (224.8/km^{2}). The racial makeup of the city was 98.1% White, 0.3% African American, 0.8% Native American, 0.3% Asian, 0.3% from other races, and 0.3% from two or more races. Hispanic or Latino of any race were 1.1% of the population.

There were 154 households, of which 33.1% had children under the age of 18 living with them, 55.8% were married couples living together, 7.8% had a female householder with no husband present, 3.9% had a male householder with no wife present, and 32.5% were non-families. 26.6% of all households were made up of individuals, and 6.4% had someone living alone who was 65 years of age or older. The average household size was 2.37 and the average family size was 2.89.

The median age in the city was 38.6 years. 24.1% of residents were under the age of 18; 6% were between the ages of 18 and 24; 29.6% were from 25 to 44; 27.4% were from 45 to 64; and 12.9% were 65 years of age or older. The gender makeup of the city was 49.3% male and 50.7% female.

=== 2000 census ===
As of the census of 2000, there were 391 people, 157 households, and 105 families living in the city. The population density was 1,440.5 inhabitants per square mile (556.2/km^{2}). There were 165 housing units at an average density of 607.9 per square mile (234.7/km^{2}). The racial makeup of the city was 98.47% White, 1.02% from other races, and 0.51% from two or more races. Hispanic or Latino of any race were 1.28% of the population.

There were 157 households, out of which 32.5% had children under the age of 18 living with them, 56.7% were married couples living together, 5.7% had a female householder with no husband present, and 32.5% were non-families. 31.2% of all households were made up of individuals, and 12.1% had someone living alone who was 65 years of age or older. The average household size was 2.49 and the average family size was 3.14.

In the city, the population was spread out, with 30.4% under the age of 18, 3.6% from 18 to 24, 32.7% from 25 to 44, 22.0% from 45 to 64, and 11.3% who were 65 years of age or older. The median age was 36 years. For every 100 females, there were 96.5 males. For every 100 females age 18 and over, there were 95.7 males.

The median income for a household in the city was $44,917, and the median income for a family was $49,375. Males had a median income of $32,396 versus $26,167 for females. The per capita income for the city was $19,421. About 1.6% of families and 4.5% of the population were below the poverty line, including none of those under age 18 and 16.2% of those age 65 or over.

== Government ==
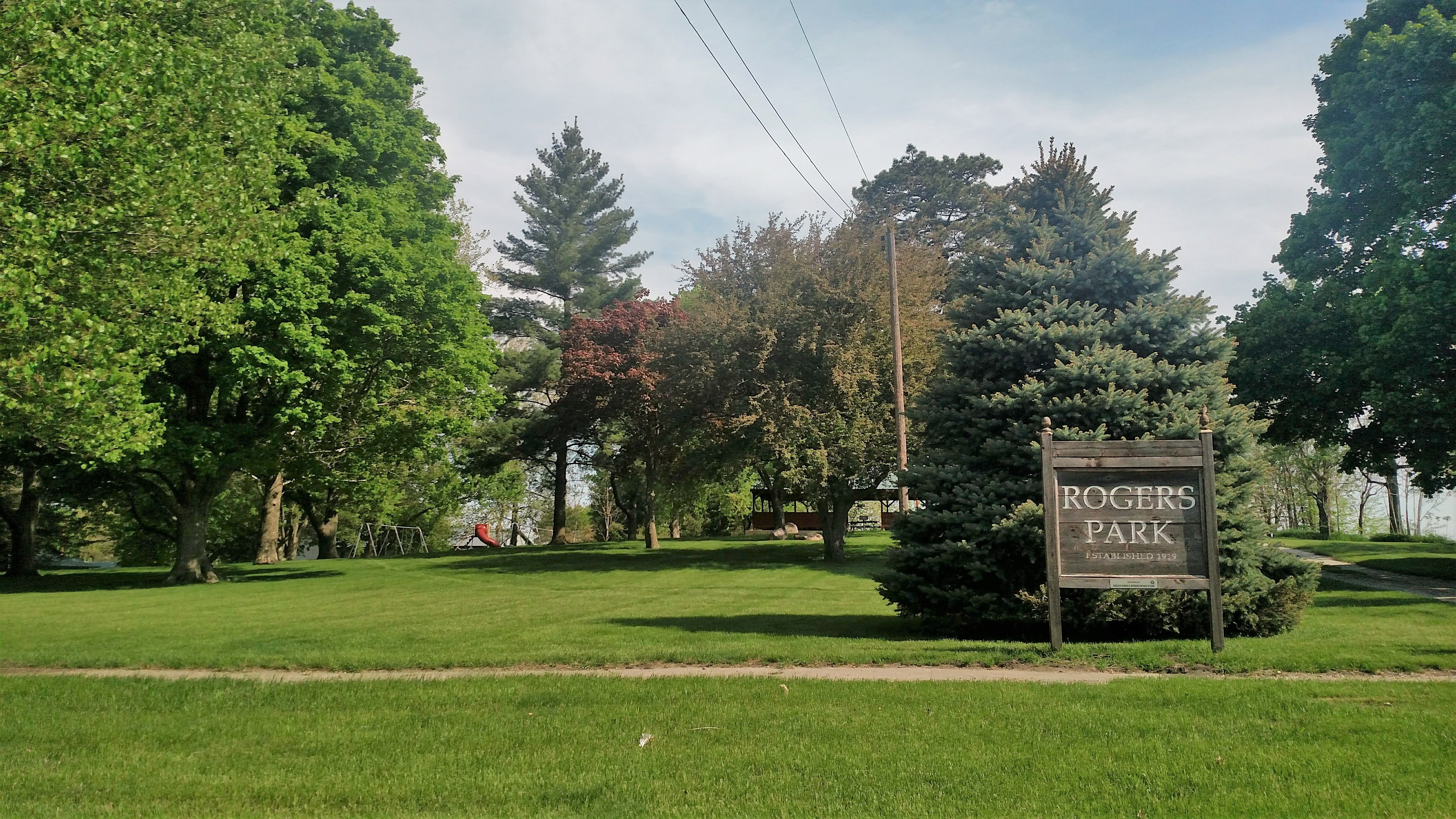
Rogers Park in Minburn

Jordan Lint served as mayor until May 2017. Kaleb Sharp became mayor in June 2017.

== Economy ==
Minburn Communications provides cable and fiber optic internet service to Minburn and several nearby areas including rural Perry, Dallas Center, Adel, Waukee, Granger, Madrid, and Woodward.

== Education ==
Minburn is within the Adel–De Soto–Minburn Community School District. The district formed on July 1, 1993, as a result of the merger of the Adel–De Soto Community School District and the Central Dallas Community School District.

== Notable person ==
- Warren Allen Smith — author of Cruising the Deuce (2010), written under pseudonym Allen Windsor

== See also ==
- Raccoon River Valley Trail
