= Casey, Iowa =

- City
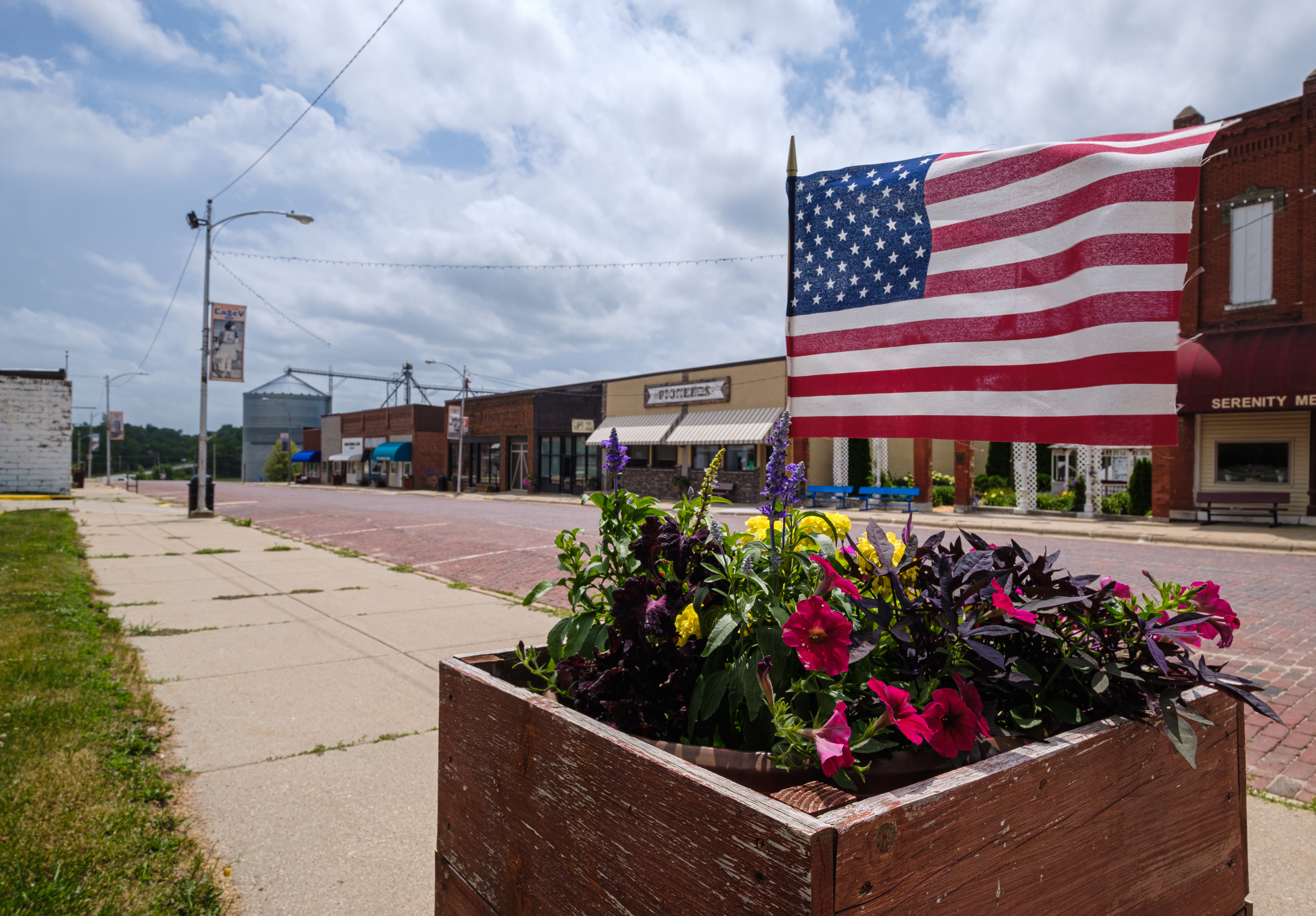
- Downtown Casey

- Logo

- Location of Casey, Iowa
- Coordinates: 41°30′27″N 94°31′17″W
- Country: United States
- State: Iowa
- Counties: Guthrie, Adair
- Townships: Thompson (Guthrie County), Walnut (Adair County)
- Platted: 1869
- Incorporated: June 29, 1880

Area
  - Total: 0.74 sq mi (1.91 km^{2})
  - Land: 0.74 sq mi (1.91 km^{2})
  - Water: 0 sq mi (0.00 km^{2})
- Elevation: 1,280 ft (390 m)

Population (2020)
  - Total: 387
  - Density: 523.6/sq mi (202.17/km^{2})
- Time zone: UTC-6 (CST)
  - Summer (DST): UTC-5 (CDT)
- ZIP code: 50048
- Area code: 641
- FIPS code: 19-11395
- GNIS feature ID: 2393766
- Website: www.cityofcaseyia.com

Casey is a city in Adair and Guthrie counties in the U.S. state of Iowa. The population was 387 at the 2020 census.

The Guthrie County portion of Casey is part of the Des Moines – West Des Moines Metropolitan Statistical Area.

== History ==
Casey was platted in 1869. The community has the name of a railroad man. The firm John and James Casey, Contractors, from Erie, Pennsylvania, under John F. Tracy, President of the Chicago, Rock Island and Pacific, built the railroad across Iowa, and through Casey, from 1866 to 1869. Most of the streets in the town are named for Union Army generals in the American Civil War.

On June 29, 1880, Casey was officially incorporated as a city.

In 2015 the City Clerk, Dorothy Dillinger, was indicted for misappropriation of city funds and burning down the city hall. She stole up to $300,000 in city funds and spent it on purchases at Victoria's Secret and Wal-Mart, among other places. Dillinger pleaded guilty in federal court and received a prison sentence of five years from judge James E. Gritzner. A new city hall and community center, which replaced the one destroyed in an attempt to cover up the embezzlement, had its groundbreaking in 2018. The estimated cost is $1 million. The majority of the building would be dedicated to community center functions.

== Geography ==
According to the United States Census Bureau, the city has a total area of 0.74 square miles (1.92 km^{2}), all land.

== Demographics ==
Historical population
Census	Pop.	Note	%±
1880	478		—
1890	452		−5.4%
1900	568		25.7%
1910	735		29.4%
1920	908		23.5%
1930	785		−13.5%
1940	709		−9.7%
1950	703		−0.8%
1960	589		−16.2%
1970	561		−4.8%
1980	473		−15.7%
1990	441		−6.8%
2000	478		8.4%
2010	426		−10.9%
2020	387		−9.2%
U.S. Decennial Census

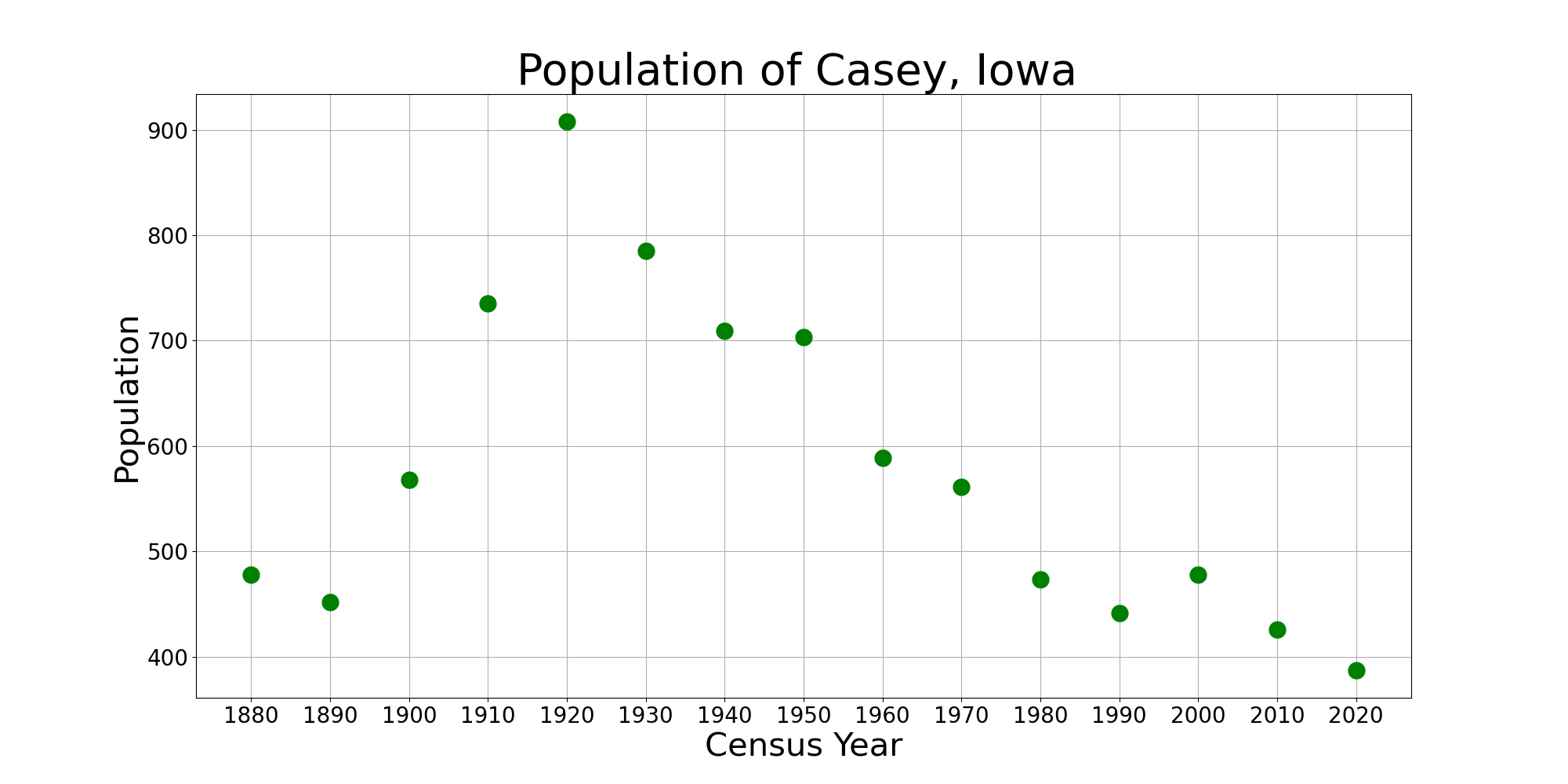
The population of Casey, Iowa from US census data

=== 2020 census ===
As of the census of 2020, there were 387 people, 177 households, and 112 families residing in the city. The population density was 523.6 inhabitants per square mile (202.2/km^{2}). There were 211 housing units at an average density of 285.5 per square mile (110.2/km^{2}). The racial makeup of the city was 92.0% White, 0.0% Black or African American, 0.5% Native American, 0.5% Asian, 1.6% Pacific Islander, 0.5% from other races and 4.9% from two or more races. Hispanic or Latino persons of any race comprised 1.8% of the population.

Of the 177 households, 33.3% of which had children under the age of 18 living with them, 37.9% were married couples living together, 10.7% were cohabitating couples, 29.4% had a female householder with no spouse or partner present and 22.0% had a male householder with no spouse or partner present. 36.7% of all households were non-families. 31.6% of all households were made up of individuals, 10.2% had someone living alone who was 65 years old or older.

The median age in the city was 43.7 years. 23.3% of the residents were under the age of 20; 5.7% were between the ages of 20 and 24; 22.7% were from 25 and 44; 28.9% were from 45 and 64; and 19.4% were 65 years of age or older. The gender makeup of the city was 49.9% male and 50.1% female.

=== 2010 census ===
As of the census of 2010, there were 426 people, 174 households, and 109 families living in the city. The population density was 575.7 inhabitants per square mile (222.3/km^{2}). There were 215 housing units at an average density of 290.5 per square mile (112.2/km^{2}). The racial makeup of the city was 96.7% White, 2.1% Asian, and 1.2% from two or more races. Hispanic or Latino of any race were 1.4% of the population.

There were 174 households, of which 30.5% had children under the age of 18 living with them, 44.8% were married couples living together, 12.1% had a female householder with no husband present, 5.7% had a male householder with no wife present, and 37.4% were non-families. 31.6% of all households were made up of individuals, and 16.1% had someone living alone who was 65 years of age or older. The average household size was 2.45 and the average family size was 3.05.

The median age in the city was 44.3 years. 26.1% of residents were under the age of 18; 7.4% were between the ages of 18 and 24; 18.6% were from 25 to 44; 28.6% were from 45 to 64; and 19.2% were 65 years of age or older. The gender makeup of the city was 49.5% male and 50.5% female.

=== 2000 census ===
As of the census of 2000, there were 478 people, 203 households, and 129 families living in the city. The population density was 649.0 inhabitants per square mile (250.6/km^{2}). There were 226 housing units at an average density of 306.8 per square mile (118.5/km^{2}). The racial makeup of the city was 98.54% White, 0.84% from other races, and 0.63% from two or more races. Hispanic or Latino of any race were 2.72% of the population.

There were 203 households, out of which 29.1% had children under the age of 18 living with them, 49.3% were married couples living together, 9.4% had a female householder with no husband present, and 36.0% were non-families. 32.0% of all households were made up of individuals, and 19.7% had someone living alone who was 65 years of age or older. The average household size was 2.35 and the average family size was 2.96.

Age spread: 26.8% under the age of 18, 5.4% from 18 to 24, 25.5% from 25 to 44, 18.6% from 45 to 64, and 23.6% who were 65 years of age or older. The median age was 39 years. For every 100 females, there were 92.7 males. For every 100 females age 18 and over, there were 94.4 males.

The median income for a household in the city was $35,000, and the median income for a family was $40,000. Males had a median income of $27,917 versus $24,167 for females. The per capita income for the city was $15,189. About 7.4% of families and 9.2% of the population were below the poverty line, including 10.3% of those under age 18 and 5.7% of those age 65 or over.

== Government ==
Nicholas Lindberg was elected mayor in 2019 and was re-elected in 2021.

== Education ==
Casey is in the Adair–Casey Community School District, and students from Casey attend Adair–Casey Elementary School and AC/GC Junior High School in Adair. Students attend AC/GC High School in Guthrie Center, a school of the Guthrie Center Community School District, under a grade-sharing arrangement.

== Notable people ==
Thomas William Duncan, author, was born and raised in Casey at 610 Wallace Street. He wrote circus novels, his most famous of which was Gus the Great, (1947). He died in 1987 in Las Cruces, New Mexico and was buried in an unmarked grave which remained so until 2015. He is the namesake of the local library.
