= Des Moines metropolitan area =

Greater Des Moines
- Metropolitan statistical area
- Des Moines–West Des Moines, IA Metropolitan Statistical Area
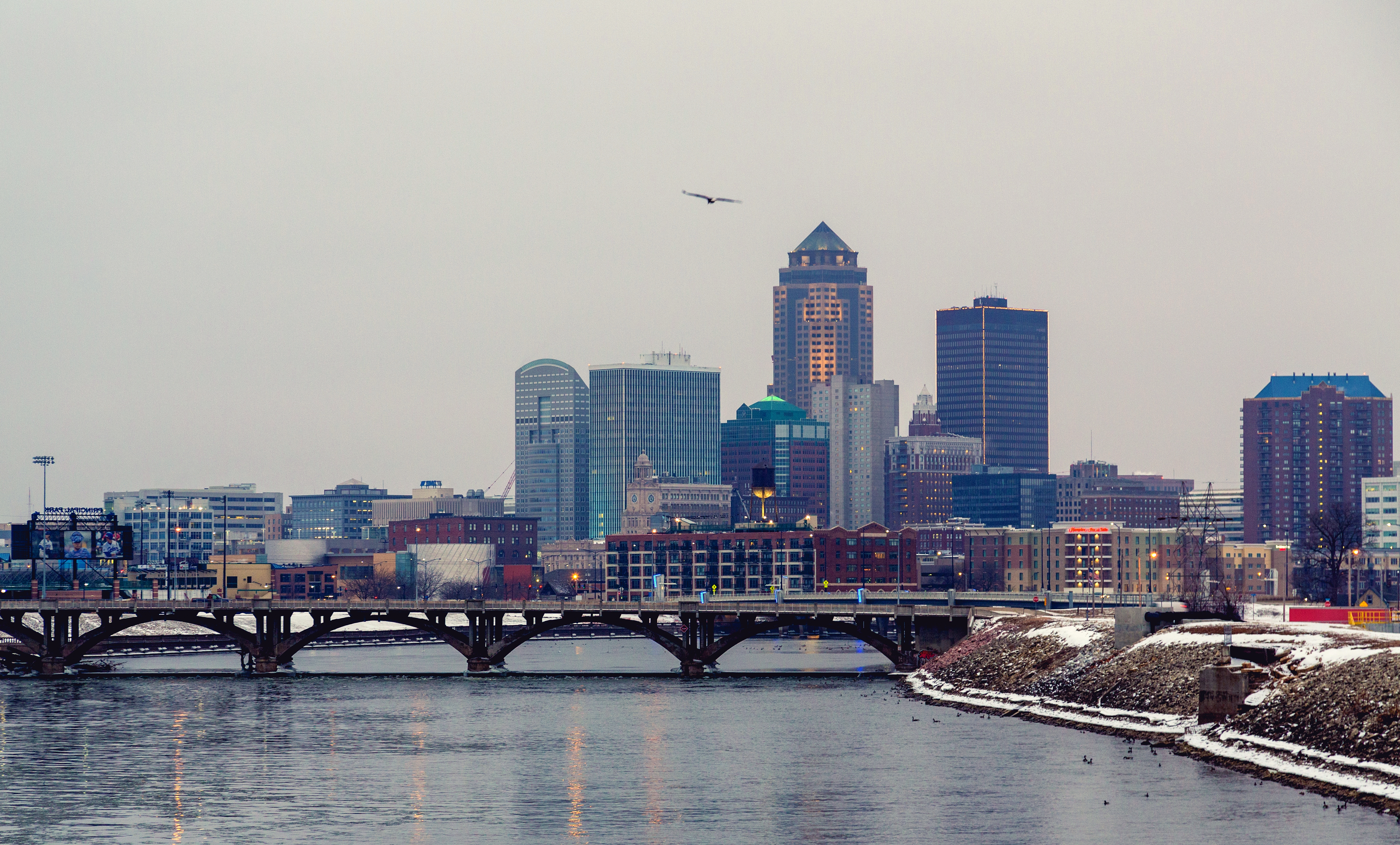
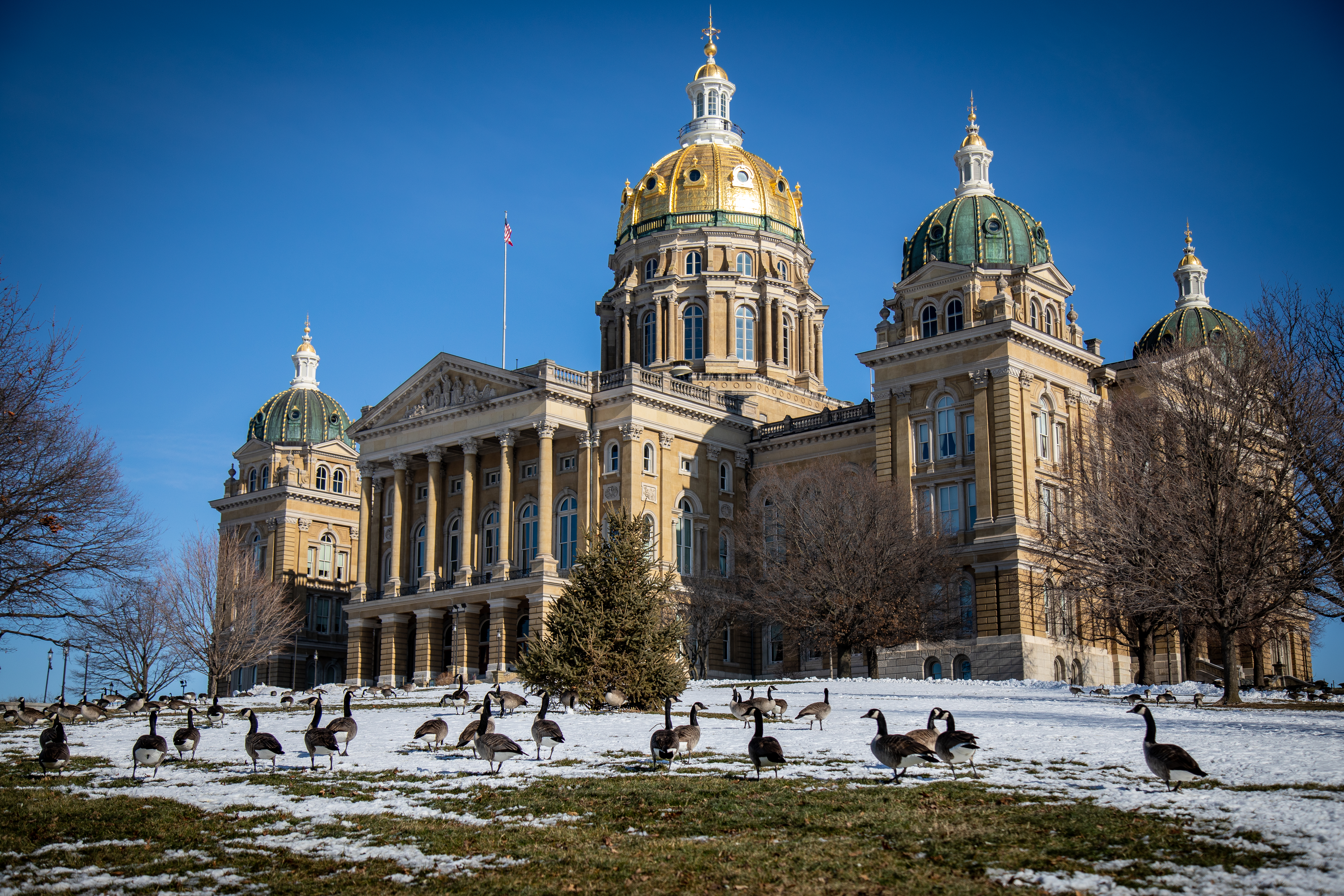
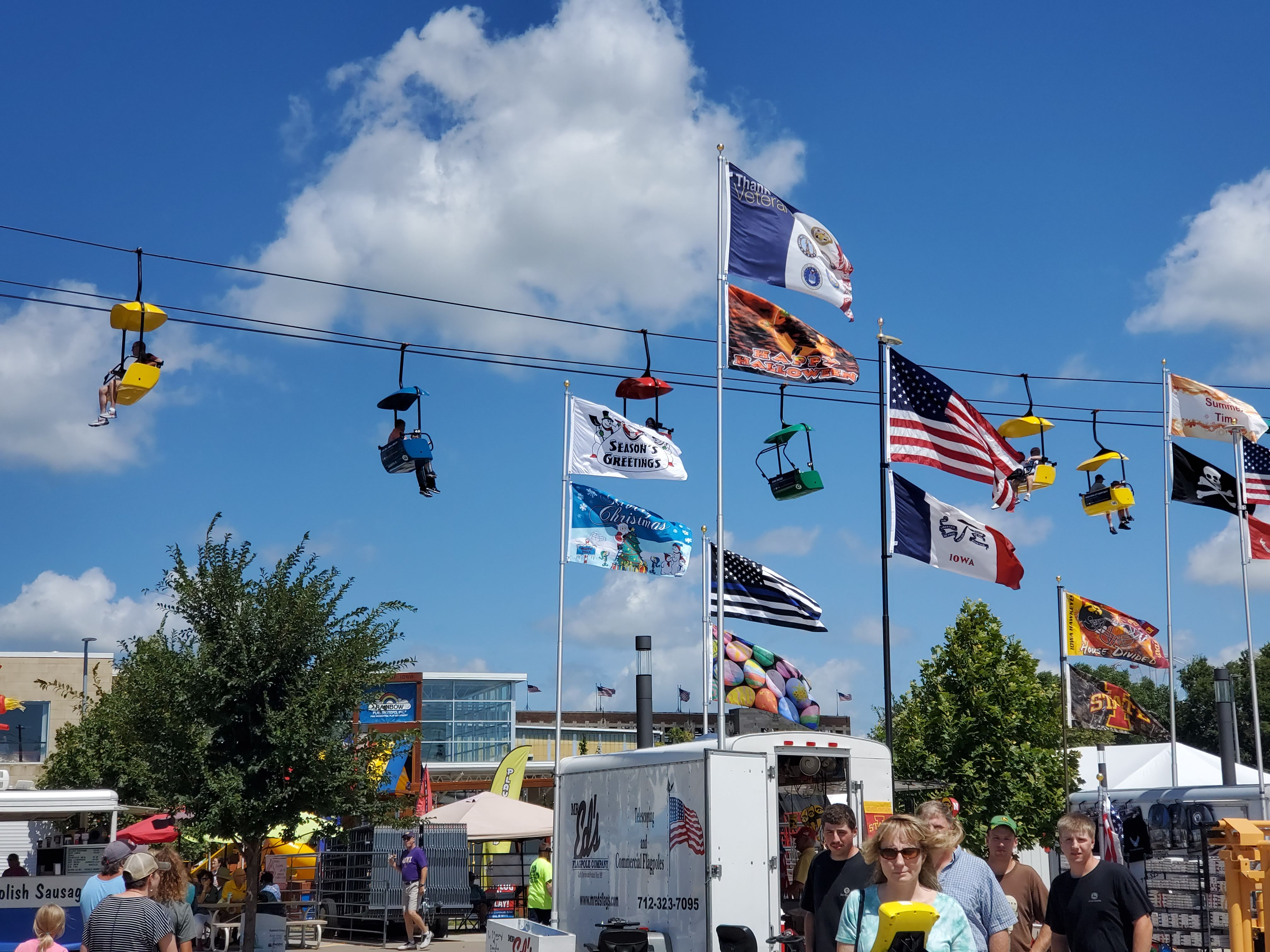
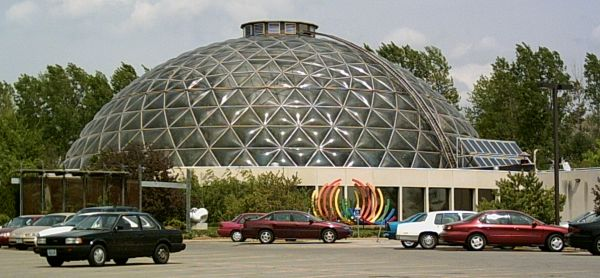
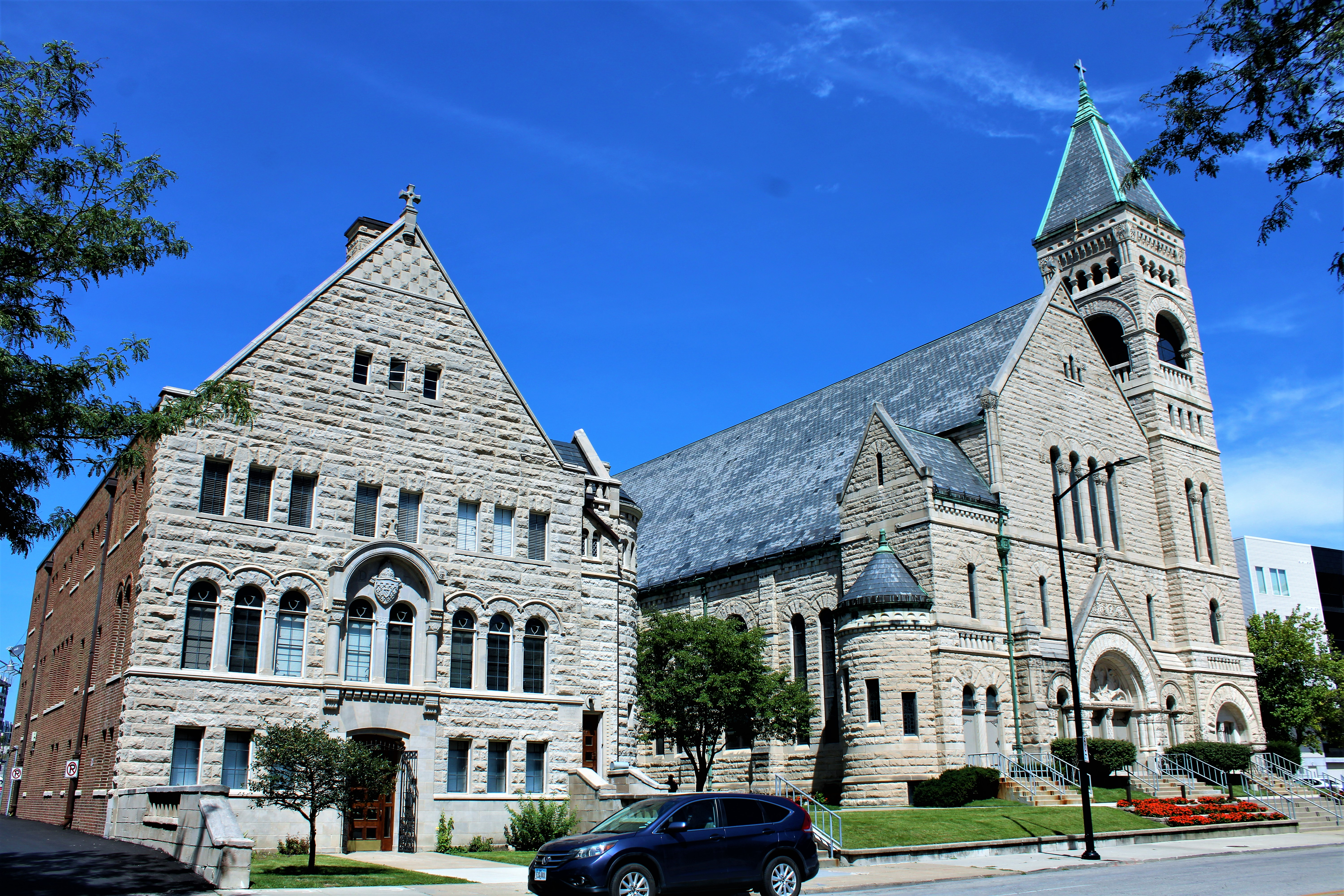
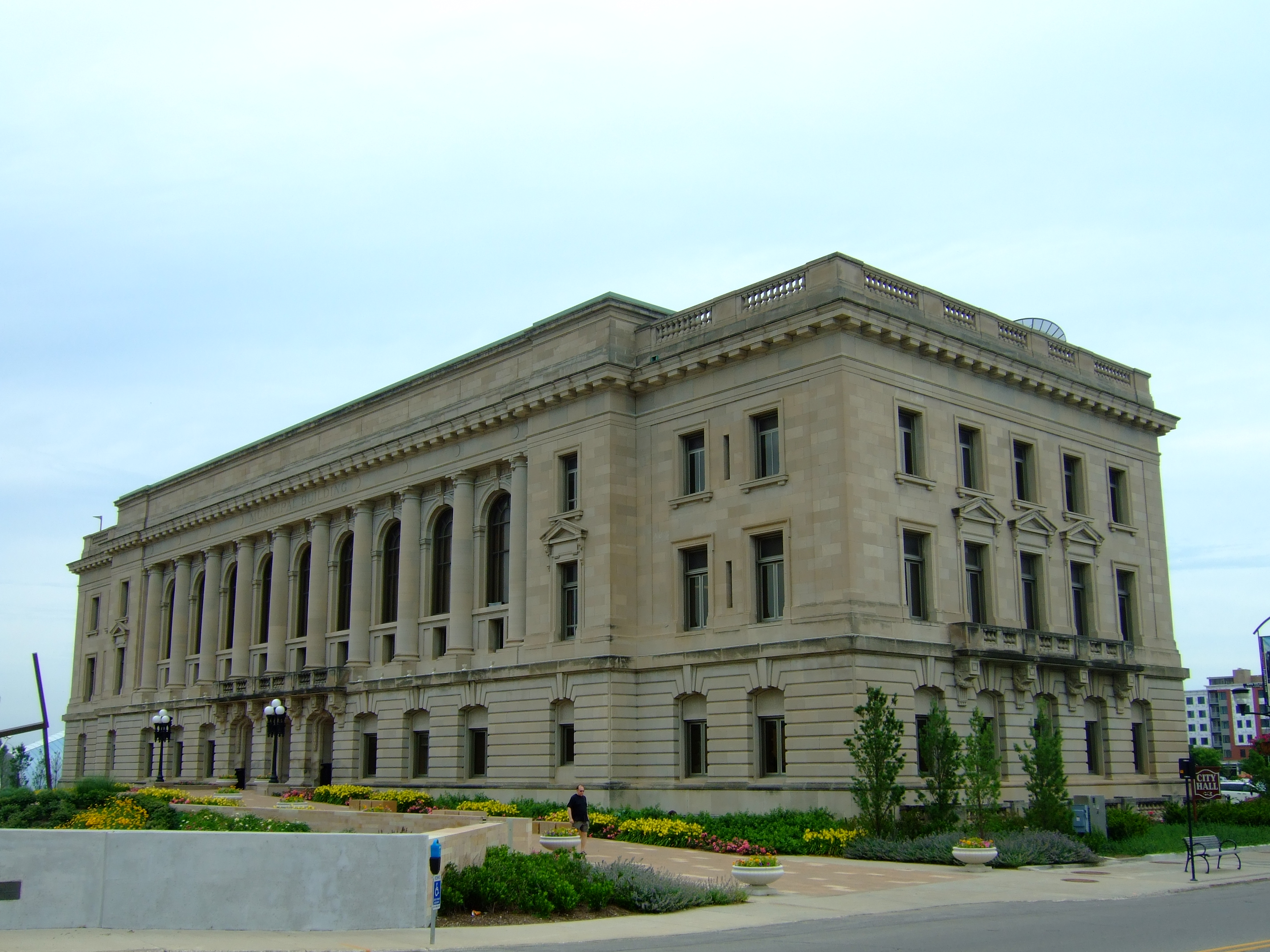
- The skyline of Downtown Des Moines Iowa State Capitol Iowa State Fair Greater Des Moines Botanical Garden St. Ambrose Cathedral Des Moines City Hall
Des Moines–West Des Moines–Ames, IA CSA
City of Des Moines
City of West Des Moines
City of Ames
Des Moines–West Des Moines, IA MSA
Ames, IA MSA
Oskaloosa, IA µSA
Pella, IA µSA
- Coordinates: 41°34′48″N 93°36′45″W
- Country: United States
- State(s): Iowa
- Largest city: Des Moines
- Other cities: West Des Moines; Ankeny; Urbandale

Area
  - Total: 3,610 sq mi (9,300 km^{2})
- Lowest elevation: 750 ft (228.6 m)

Population (2024)
  - Total: 779,048
  - Rank: 78th in the U.S.
  - Density: 209/sq mi (80.6/km^{2})

GDP
  - MSA: $67.334 billion (2022)

The Des Moines metropolitan area, officially known as the Des Moines–West Des Moines, IA Metropolitan Statistical Area (MSA) is located at the confluence of the Des Moines River and the Raccoon River. Des Moines serves as the capital and largest city of the U.S. state of Iowa. The metro area consists of six counties in central Iowa: Polk, Dallas, Warren, Madison, Guthrie, and Jasper. The Des Moines–Ames–West Des Moines Combined Statistical Area (CSA) encompasses the separate metropolitan area of Ames (Story and Boone Counties), and the separate micropolitan areas of Oskaloosa (Mahaska County) and Pella (Marion County). The Des Moines area is a fast-growing metro area.

== Demographics ==
Des Moines–West Des Moines, IA Metropolitan Statistical Area

County	Seat	2025 estimate	2020 Census	Change	Area	Density
Polk	Des Moines	516,546	492,401	+4.90%	592 sq mi (1,530 km^{2})	832/sq mi (321/km^{2})
Dallas	Adel	118,457	99,678	+18.84%	592 sq mi (1,530 km^{2})	168/sq mi (65/km^{2})
Warren	Indianola	57,331	52,403	+9.40%	573 sq mi (1,480 km^{2})	91/sq mi (35/km^{2})
Jasper	Newton	38,153	37,813	+0.90%	733 sq mi (1,900 km^{2})	52/sq mi (20/km^{2})
Madison	Winterset	17,270	16,548	+4.36%	562 sq mi (1,460 km^{2})	29/sq mi (11/km^{2})
Guthrie	Guthrie Center	10,782	10,623	+1.50%	593 sq mi (1,540 km^{2})	18/sq mi (7/km^{2})
Total		758,539	709,466	+6.92%	3,610 sq mi (9,300 km^{2})	197/sq mi (76/km^{2})

Des Moines–West Des Moines–Ames, IA Combined Statistical Area

Statistical Area	2025 estimate	2020 Census	Change	Area	Density
Des Moines–West Des Moines, IA Metropolitan Statistical Area	758,539	709,466	+6.92%	3,610 sq mi (9,300 km^{2})	210/sq mi (81/km^{2})
Ames, IA Metropolitan Statistical Area	128,090	125,252	+2.27%	1,148 sq mi (2,970 km^{2})	112/sq mi (43/km^{2})
Pella, IA Micropolitan Statistical Area	34,192	33,414	+2.33%	571 sq mi (1,480 km^{2})	60/sq mi (23/km^{2})
Oskaloosa, IA Micropolitan Statistical Area	21,880	22,190	−1.40%	573 sq mi (1,480 km^{2})	38/sq mi (15/km^{2})
Total	942,701	890,322	+5.88%	5,902 sq mi (15,290 km^{2})	160/sq mi (62/km^{2})

== Geography ==
The lowest geographical point in the metropolitan area is the Des Moines River, where it passes the northeastern corner of Warren County, and the southeastern corner of Polk County.

== Historical growth ==
Polk County was the only county in the Des Moines metropolitan area when the United States Bureau of the Budget first defined metropolitan areas in 1950. Warren County was added in 1973 and Dallas County was added in 1983. Guthrie and Madison counties were added in 2003 after metropolitan areas were redefined. In 2005 the area was renamed the Des Moines–West Des Moines Metropolitan Statistical Area after a special census showed that West Des Moines had topped the 50,000 mark in population. Jasper County was added in September 2018.

== Communities by size ==
The following are cities and villages categorized based on the United States Census Bureau 2025 population estimates. No population estimates are released for census-designated places (CDPs), which are marked with an asterisk (*). These places are categorized based on their 2020 Census population.

=== Principal City ===
- Des Moines (212,086)

=== Places with 50,000 to 100,000 inhabitants ===
- Ankeny (77,833)
- West Des Moines (74,224)

=== Places with 10,000 to 50,000 inhabitants ===
- Urbandale (48,570)
- Waukee (34,890)
- Johnston (25,065)
- Altoona (22,796)
- Clive (19,861)
- Grimes (17,405)
- Indianola (16,829)
- Newton (15,741)
- Norwalk (15,004)
- Pleasant Hill (11,239)

=== Places with 1,000 to 10,000 inhabitants ===
- Bondurant (9,647)
- Perry (8,208)
- Adel (7,098)
- Polk City (6,630)
- Winterset (5,520)
- Windsor Heights (5,059)
- Carlisle (4,532)
- Saylorville* (3,584)
- Mitchellville (2,671)
- Colfax (2,303)
- Granger (2,179)
- Dallas Center (2,042)
- Monroe (2,022)
- Van Meter (1,978)
- Stuart (partial) (1,882)
- Prairie City (1,724)
- Guthrie Center (1,583)
- Woodward (1,426)
- Earlham (1,396)
- Lake Panorama* (1,266)
- Coon Rapids (partial) (1,251)
- Elkhart (1,097)
- Panora (1,094)

=== Places with fewer than 1,000 inhabitants ===
- Baxter (984)
- De Soto (976)
- Sully (891)
- Milo (784)
- Adair (partial) (776)
- Hartford (747)
- Redfield (741)
- Dexter (641)
- St. Charles (641)
- Kellogg (599)
- Cumming (560)
- Truro (509)
- New Virginia (507)
- Runnells (461)
- Alleman (440)
- Martensdale (426)
- Bayard (401)
- Casey (partial) (386)
- Lynnville (383)
- Diamondhead Lake* (371)
- Menlo (346)
- Lacona (344)
- Minburn (323)
- Mingo (313)
- Sheldahl (partial) (306)
- Yale (264)
- Bagley (228)
- Linden (210)
- Jamaica (197)
- Oakland Acres (178)
- Patterson (176)
- Lambs Grove (171)
- Reasnor (158)
- Bouton (127)
- St. Marys (124)
- Ackworth (121)
- East Peru (119)
- Dawson (114)
- Macksburg (103)
- Spring Hill (71)
- Sandyville (61)
- Bevington (60)
- Valeria (41)

=== Unincorporated places ===
- Avon
- Berwick
- Booneville
- Farrar
- Ira
- Killduff
- Rushville
- Liberty Center

== Demographics of metropolitan area ==
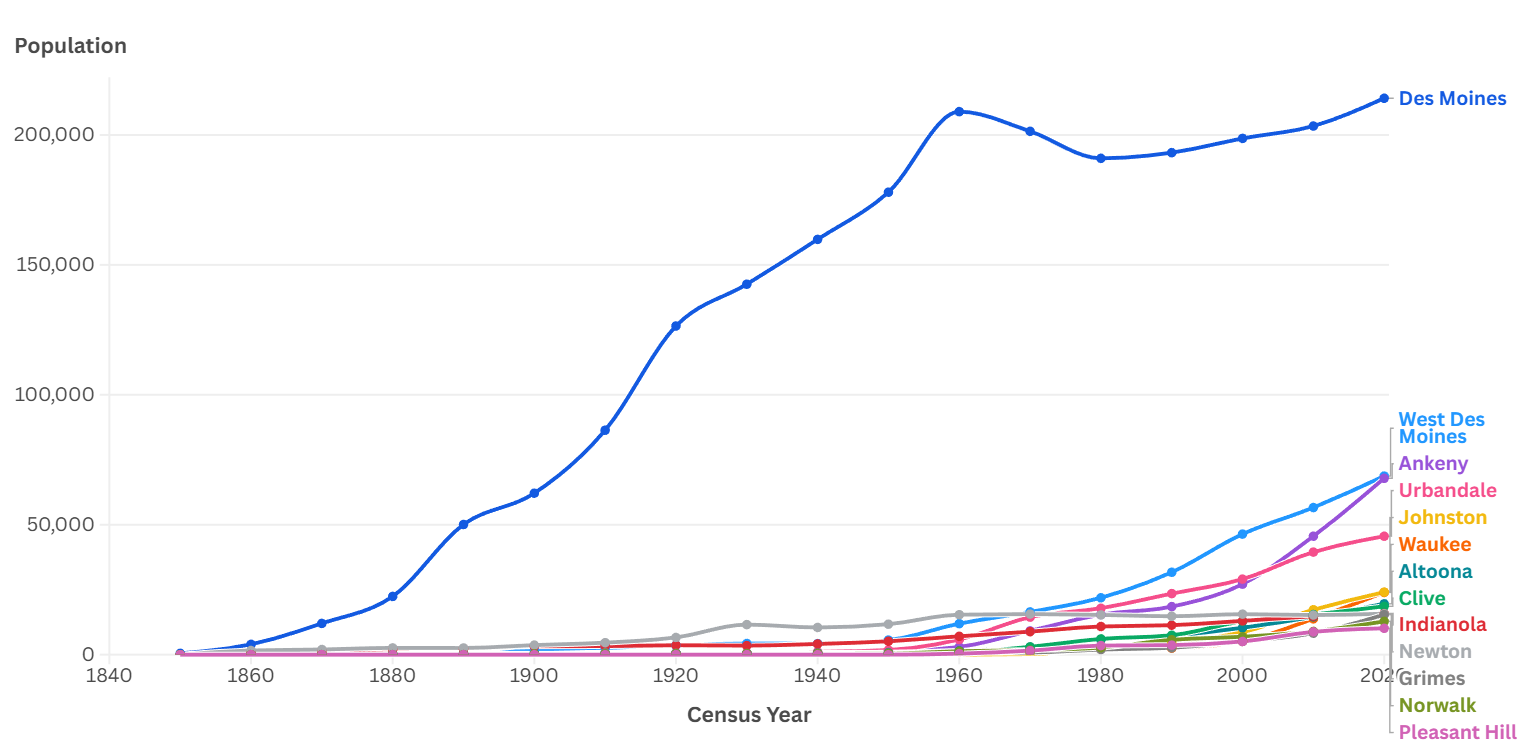
Population of cities in the Des Moines Metropolitan area with more than 10,000 inhabitants

Historical population
Census	Pop.	Note	%±
1900	82,684		—
1910	110,438		33.6%
1920	154,029		39.5%
1930	172,837		12.2%
1940	195,835		13.3%
1950	226,010		15.4%
1960	337,169		49.2%
1970	363,419		7.8%
1980	392,141		7.9%
1990	416,346		6.2%
2000	481,394		15.6%
2010	569,633		18.3%
2020	709,466		24.5%
2022 (est.)	729,053		2.8%
U.S. Decennial Census

As of the census of 2000, there were 481,394 people, 189,371 households, and 126,177 families residing within the MSA. The racial makeup of the MSA was 90.24% White, 3.85% African American, 0.24% Native American, 2.15% Asian, 0.05% Pacific Islander, 2.00% from other races, and 1.46% from two or more races. Hispanic or Latino of any race were 4.02% of the population.

The median income for a household in the MSA was $44,667, and the median income for a family was $52,617. Males had a median income of $34,710 versus $25,593 for females. The per capita income for the MSA was $21,253.

The census tracts for 2000 are shown in the map from the Iowa Data Center.

== Economy ==
Des Moines area top non-government employers (2024)
Rank	Employer	# of employees
1	Hy-Vee Inc.	11,782
2	Wells Fargo & Co.	11,000+
3	MercyOne	5,641
4	Principal	5,595
5	UnityPoint Health	5,147
6	Amazon	4,100
7	John Deere	3,800
8	Vermeer Corporation	3,600
9	Nationwide	3,300
10	JBS USA	2,300

Des Moines is a major center of the US insurance industry and has a sizable financial services and publishing business base. The city was credited as the "number one spot for U.S. insurance companies" in a Business Wire article and named the third-largest "insurance capital" of the world. The city is the headquarters for the Principal Financial Group, Ruan Transportation, TMC Transportation, EMC Insurance Companies, and Wellmark Blue Cross Blue Shield. Other major corporations such as Wells Fargo, Cognizant, Voya Financial, Nationwide Mutual Insurance Company, ACE Limited, Marsh, Monsanto, and Corteva have large operations in or near the metropolitan area. In recent years, Microsoft, Hewlett-Packard, and Facebook have built data-processing and logistical facilities in the Des Moines area.

The Des Moines area is home to 2 Fortune 1000 headquarters – 2026 rankings

DSM Rank	Company	City	Sector	Fortune Rank
1	Casey's General Store	Ankeny	Convenience	282
2	Principal Financial Group	Des Moines	Insurance	287

== Education ==
=== Colleges and universities ===
- Des Moines Area Community College - Des Moines, Ankeny, Boone, Carroll, Newton and West Des Moines
- Drake University - Des Moines
- Des Moines University - West Des Moines
- Faith Baptist Bible College - Ankeny
- Grand View University - Des Moines
- Mercy College of Health Sciences - Des Moines
- Simpson College - Indianola and West Des Moines
- Purdue University Global - Urbandale
- Upper Iowa University - West Des Moines

== Sports ==
Professional and Division I sports teams
Club	Sport	League	Venue	City	Founded
Iowa Barnstormers	American football	Indoor Football League	Casey's Center	Des Moines	1995 (2008)
Iowa Cubs	Baseball	International League, Minor League Baseball	Principal Park	Des Moines	1969
Iowa Wolves	Basketball	NBA G League	Casey's Center	Des Moines	2007
Des Moines Buccaneers	Ice hockey	United States Hockey League	Buccaneer Arena	Urbandale	1980
Iowa Wild	Ice hockey	American Hockey League	Casey's Center	Des Moines	2013
Des Moines Menace	Soccer	USL League Two	Drake Stadium	Des Moines	1994
Drake Bulldogs	Multi	NCAA Division I, Missouri Valley Conference	Drake Stadium, Knapp Center	Des Moines	1881

== Transportation ==
=== Airports ===
- Des Moines International Airport (DSM)

Relief Airports

- Ankeny Regional Airport (IKV)
- Ames Municipal Airport (AMW)
- Boone Municipal Airport (BNW)
- Grinnell Regional Airport (GGI)
- Guthrie County Regional Airport (GCT)
- Newton Municipal Airport (TNU)
- Oskaloosa Municipal Airport (OOA)
- Winterset Municipal Airport (343)

=== Major highways ===
Interstates

- I-35
- I-80
- I-235

U.S. Highways

- US 6
- US 65
- US 69

Iowa Highways

- IA 5
- IA 28
- IA 141
- IA 163
- IA 415

=== Transit ===
- Des Moines Area Regional Transit
