= Seely Township =

Seely Creek Township may refer to the following townships in the United States:

- Seely Township, Guthrie County, Iowa
- Seely Township, Faribault County, Minnesota

== See also ==
- Seely
- Sealy Township, Logan County, North Dakota
