= Dale, Iowa =

- Unincorporated community
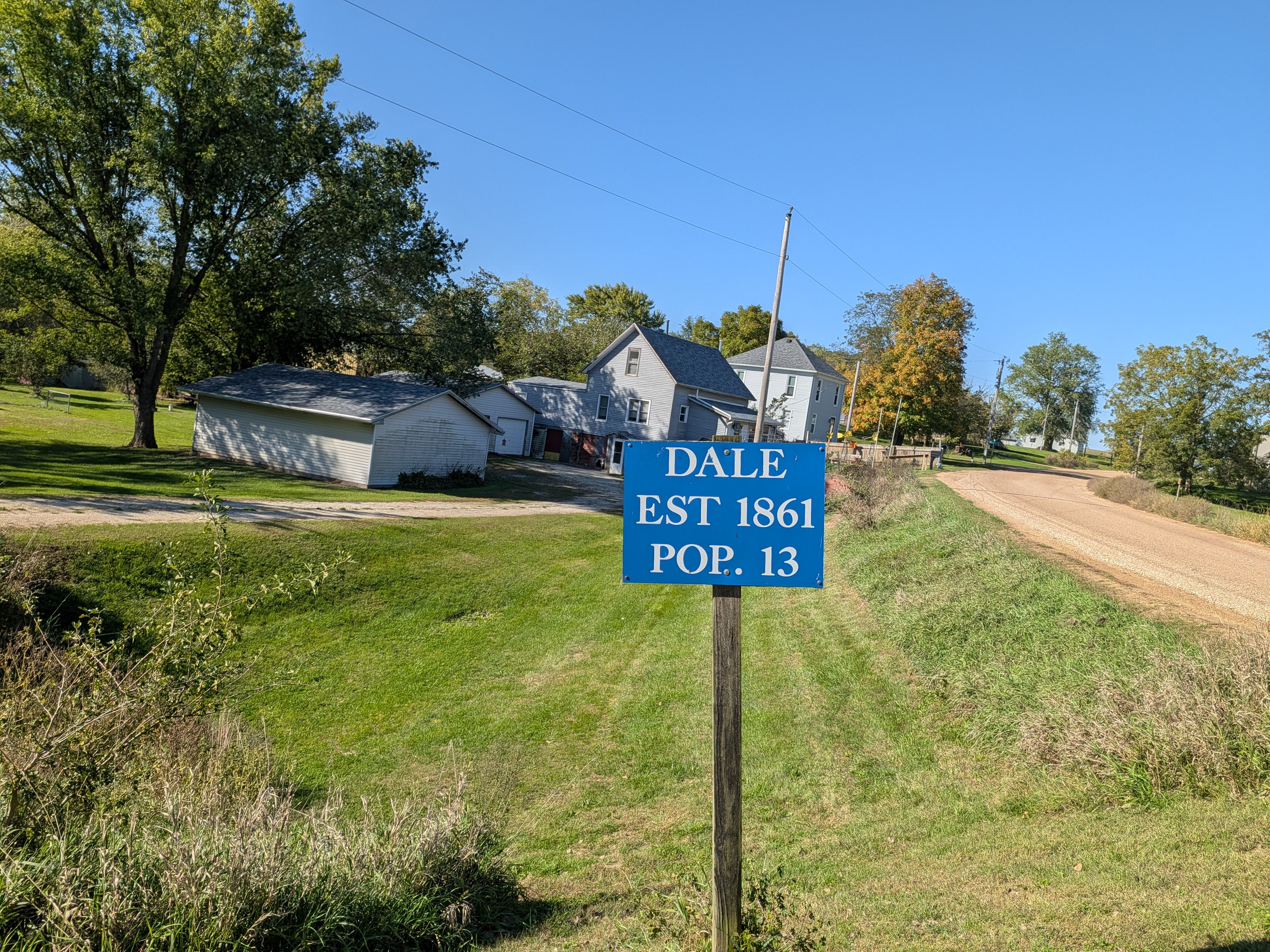
- Sign in Dale City

- Location within Iowa
- Coordinates: 41.595821°N 94.341909°W
- Country: United States
- State: Iowa
- County: Guthrie
- Elevation: 1,004 ft (306 m)
- Time zone: UTC-6 (Central (CST))
  - Summer (DST): UTC-5 (CDT)
- Area code: 641

Dale (also known as Dale City) is an unincorporated community in Guthrie County, Iowa, United States.

== History ==
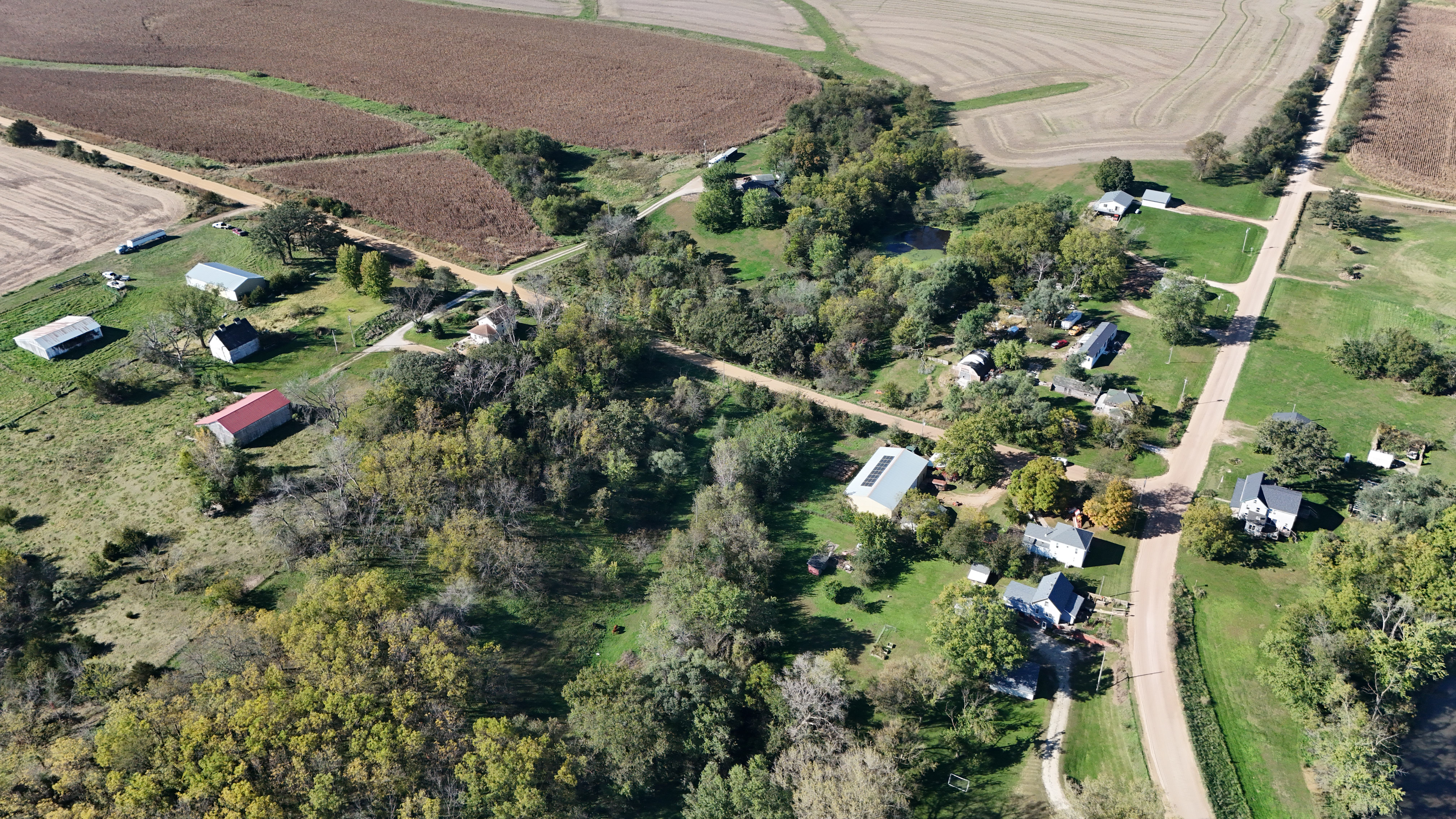
Dale on Oct. 10, 2025

Dale was laid out in 1856 by John Lonsdale. A post office operated in Dale from 1852 to 1922.

Dale was formerly called Allen from 1852 to 1856, Morrisburgh from 1856 to 1865, and Dale City from 1865 to 1883 before its current name.

The population was 32 in 1940.
