= Bear Grove Township, Guthrie County, Iowa =

Township in Guthrie County, Iowa, U.S.

Coordinates: 41°38′56″N 94°41′42″W

Bear Grove Township is one of seventeen townships in Guthrie County, Iowa, United States. It is located WSW of Guthrie Center just west of Sutcliff Woodland. As of the 2010 census, its population was 160.
