= Lake Panorama, Iowa =

- Census-designated place
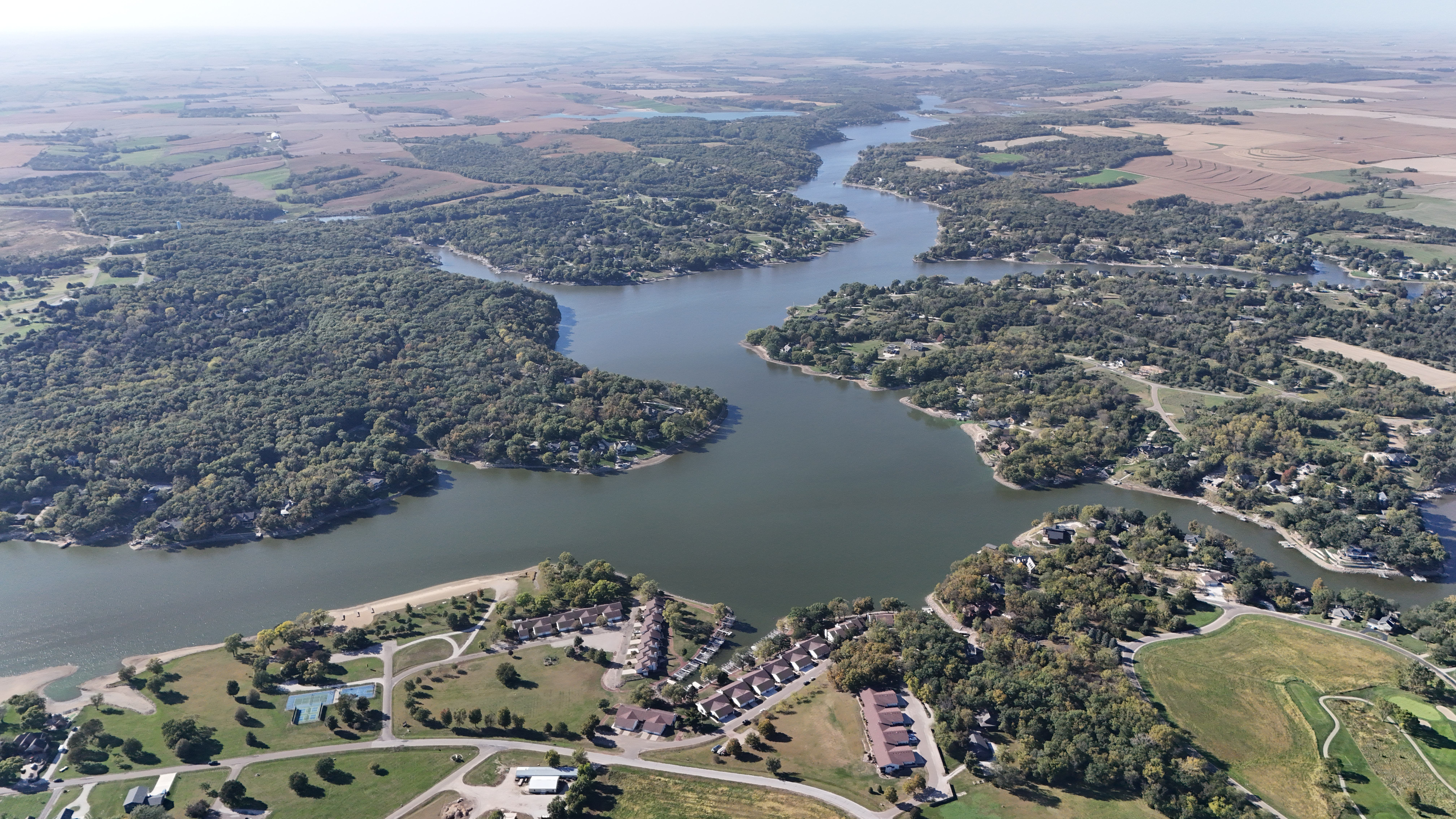
- Aerial view of Lake Panorama

- Location within Iowa Location within the United States
- Coordinates: 41°42′50″N 94°23′54″W
- Country: United States
- State: Iowa
- County: Guthrie
- Townships: Cass, Victory

Area
  - Total: 8.29 sq mi (21.46 km^{2})
  - Land: 6.61 sq mi (17.12 km^{2})
  - Water: 1.68 sq mi (4.34 km^{2})
- Elevation: 1,070 ft (330 m)

Population (2020)
  - Total: 1,266
  - Density: 191.5/sq mi (73.93/km^{2})
- Time zone: Central (CST)
- FIPS code: 19-42575
- GNIS feature ID: 2629969

Lake Panorama is a census-designated place located in Cass Township and Victory Township in Guthrie County, Iowa, United States. In the 2020 census the population was 1266.

It is located in east-central Guthrie County and is bordered to the southeast by the city of Panora. The CDP is a residential community on both sides of Lake Panorama, a reservoir constructed on the Middle Raccoon River.

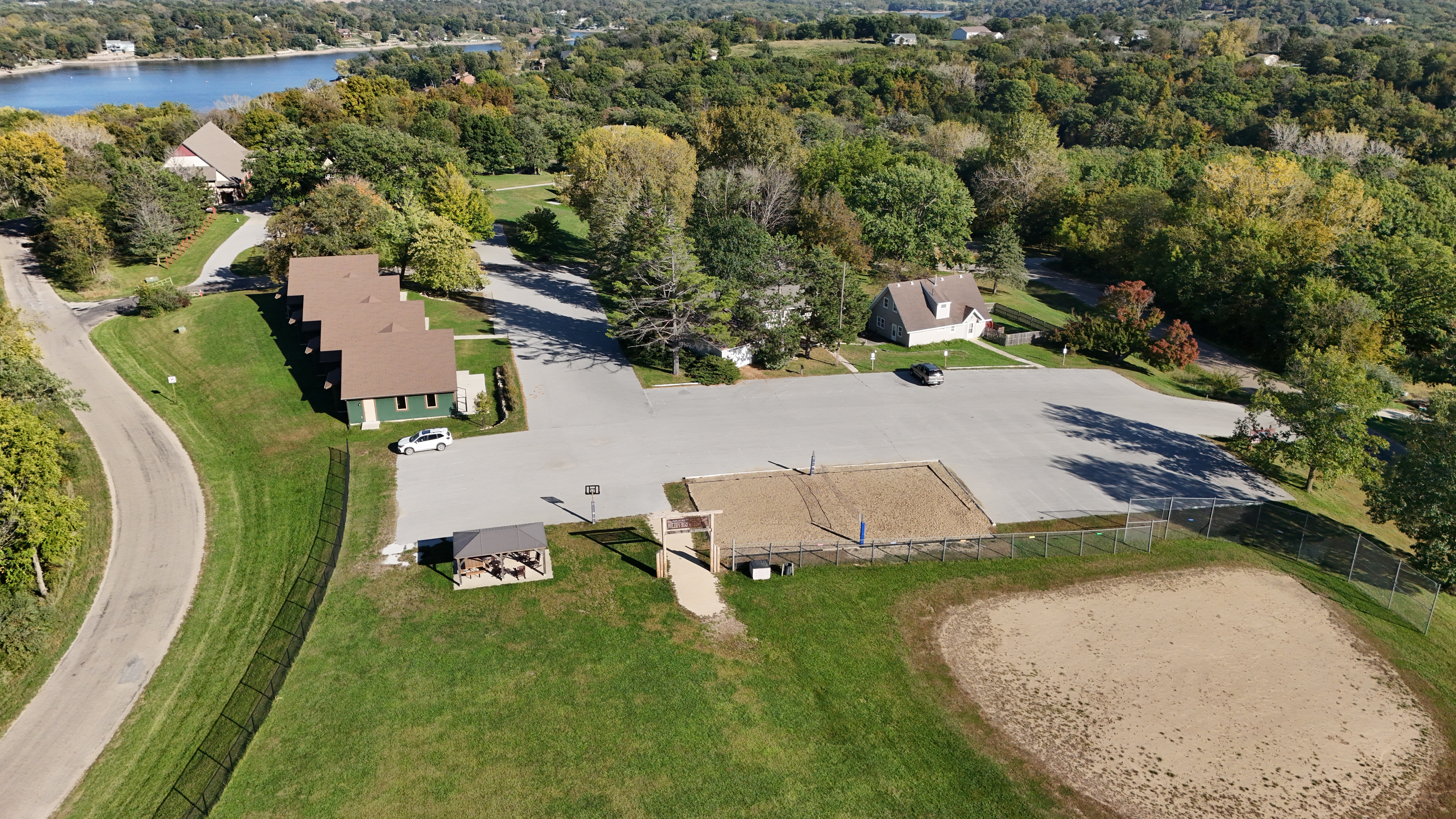
Catholic Youth Camp at Lake Panorama

According to the U.S. Census Bureau, the Lake Panorama CDP has a total area of 8.3 square miles (21.5 km^{2}), of which 6.6 square miles (17.1 km^{2}) are land, and 1.7 square miles (4.3 km^{2}), or 20.19%, are within Lake Panorama, the water body.

== Demographics ==
Historical population
Census	Pop.	Note	%±
2010	1,309		—
2020	1,266		−3.3%
U.S. Decennial Census

=== 2020 census ===
As of the 2020 census, Lake Panorama had a population of 1,266 and a population density of 191.5 inhabitants per square mile (73.9/km^{2}). The median age was 57.8 years. 14.0% of residents were under the age of 18 and 34.4% were 65 years of age or older. For every 100 females, there were 92.7 males, and for every 100 females age 18 and over, there were 92.1 males age 18 and over. The gender makeup of the community was 48.1% male and 51.9% female.

Age distribution was 16.4% under the age of 20, 2.4% from 20 to 24, 14.1% from 25 to 44, and 32.8% from 45 to 64.

0.0% of residents lived in urban areas, while 100.0% lived in rural areas.

There were 588 households and 411 families in the CDP. Of the households, 13.6% had children under the age of 18 living with them, 66.5% were married-couple households, 3.1% were cohabitating couples, 16.5% had a female householder with no spouse or partner present, and 13.9% had a male householder with no spouse or partner present. About 30.1% of all households were non-families, 27.6% were made up of individuals, and 17.2% had someone living alone who was 65 years of age or older.

There were 1,140 housing units at an average density of 172.4 per square mile (66.6/km^{2}), of which 48.4% were vacant. The homeowner vacancy rate was 8.6% and the rental vacancy rate was 4.7%.

Racial composition as of the 2020 census
Race	Number	Percent
White	1,229	97.1%
Black or African American	2	0.2%
American Indian and Alaska Native	1	0.1%
Asian	0	0.0%
Native Hawaiian and Other Pacific Islander	0	0.0%
Some other race	7	0.6%
Two or more races	27	2.1%
Hispanic or Latino (of any race)	10	0.8%

== Local traditions ==
The Annual Merryman Broomball Tournament is a broomball tournament that takes place annually between December and February on Lake Panorama, Iowa.
