= Guthrie County, Iowa =

County in Iowa, United States

- County
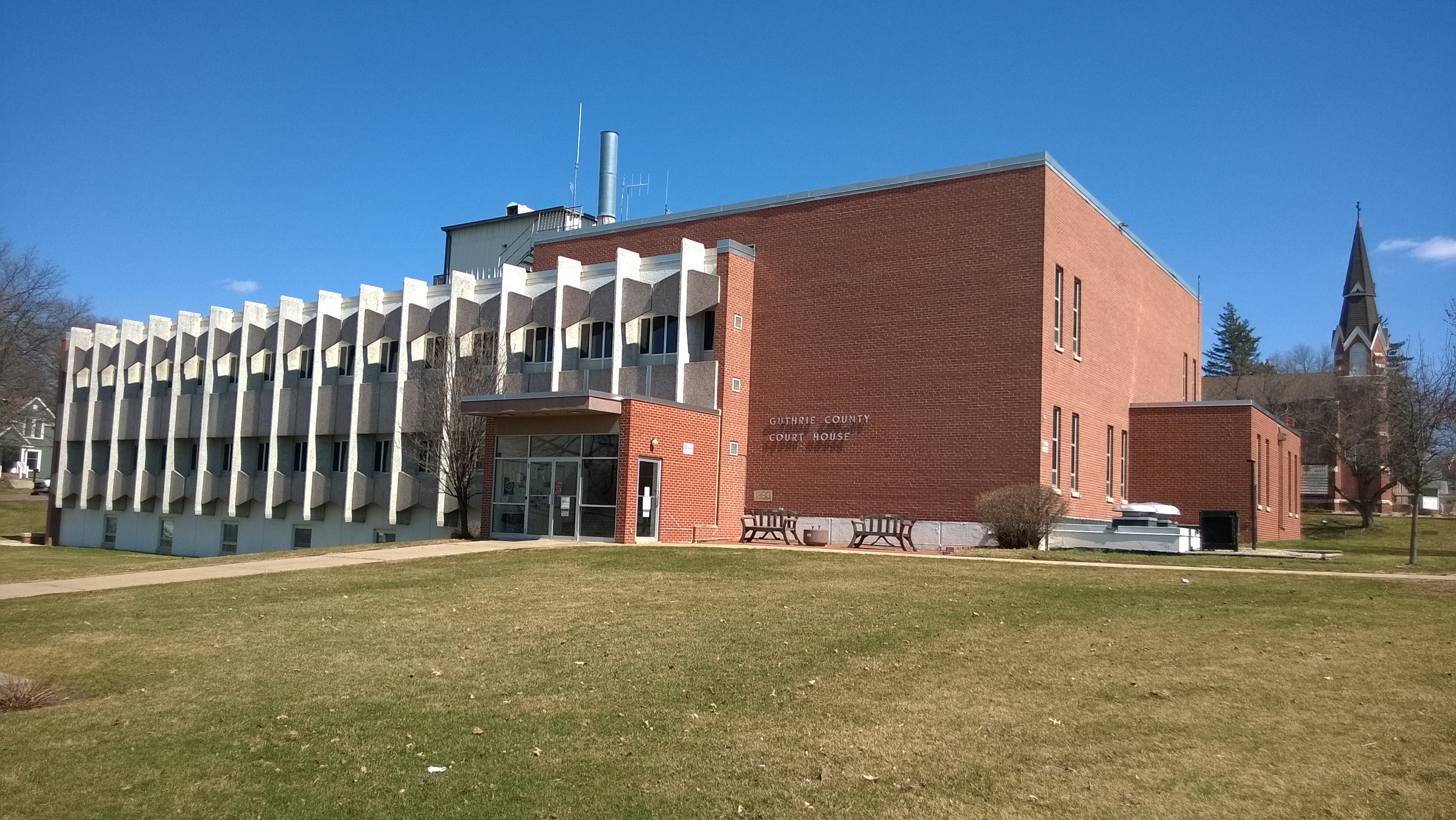
- Guthrie County Courthouse

- Location within the U.S. state of Iowa
- Coordinates: 41°41′00″N 94°30′00″W
- Country: United States
- State: Iowa
- Founded: January 15, 1851
- Seat: Guthrie Center
- Largest city: Guthrie Center

Area
  - Total: 593 sq mi (1,540 km^{2})
  - Land: 591 sq mi (1,530 km^{2})
  - Water: 2.5 sq mi (6.5 km^{2}) 0.4%

Population (2020)
  - Total: 10,623
  - Estimate (2025): 10,782 ▲
  - Density: 18.0/sq mi (6.94/km^{2})
- Time zone: UTC−6 (Central)
  - Summer (DST): UTC−5 (CDT)
- Congressional district: 3rd
- Website: guthriecounty.gov
- Iowa county number 39

Guthrie County is a county located in the U.S. state of Iowa. As of the 2020 census, the population was 10,623. The county seat is Guthrie Center. The county was formed on January 15, 1851, and named after Captain Edwin B. Guthrie, who died in the Mexican–American War. Guthrie County is one of the six counties that make up the Des Moines metropolitan area.

== Geography ==
According to the United States Census Bureau, the county has a total area of 593 square miles (1,540 km^{2}), of which 591 square miles (1,530 km^{2}) is land and 2.5 square miles (6.5 km^{2}) (0.4%) is water.

=== Major highways ===
- Iowa Highway 4
- Iowa Highway 25
- Iowa Highway 44
- Iowa Highway 141

=== Adjacent counties ===
- Greene County (north)
- Dallas County (east)
- Adair County (south)
- Audubon County (west)
- Carroll County (northwest)

== Demographics ==
Historical population
Census	Pop.	Note	%±
1860	3,058		—
1870	7,061		130.9%
1880	14,394		103.9%
1890	17,380		20.7%
1900	18,729		7.8%
1910	17,374		−7.2%
1920	17,596		1.3%
1930	17,324		−1.5%
1940	17,210		−0.7%
1950	15,197		−11.7%
1960	13,607		−10.5%
1970	12,243		−10.0%
1980	11,983		−2.1%
1990	10,935		−8.7%
2000	11,353		3.8%
2010	10,954		−3.5%
2020	10,623		−3.0%
2025 (est.)	10,782	▲	1.5%
U.S. Decennial Census; 1790–1960 1900–1990; 1990–2000 2010–2020

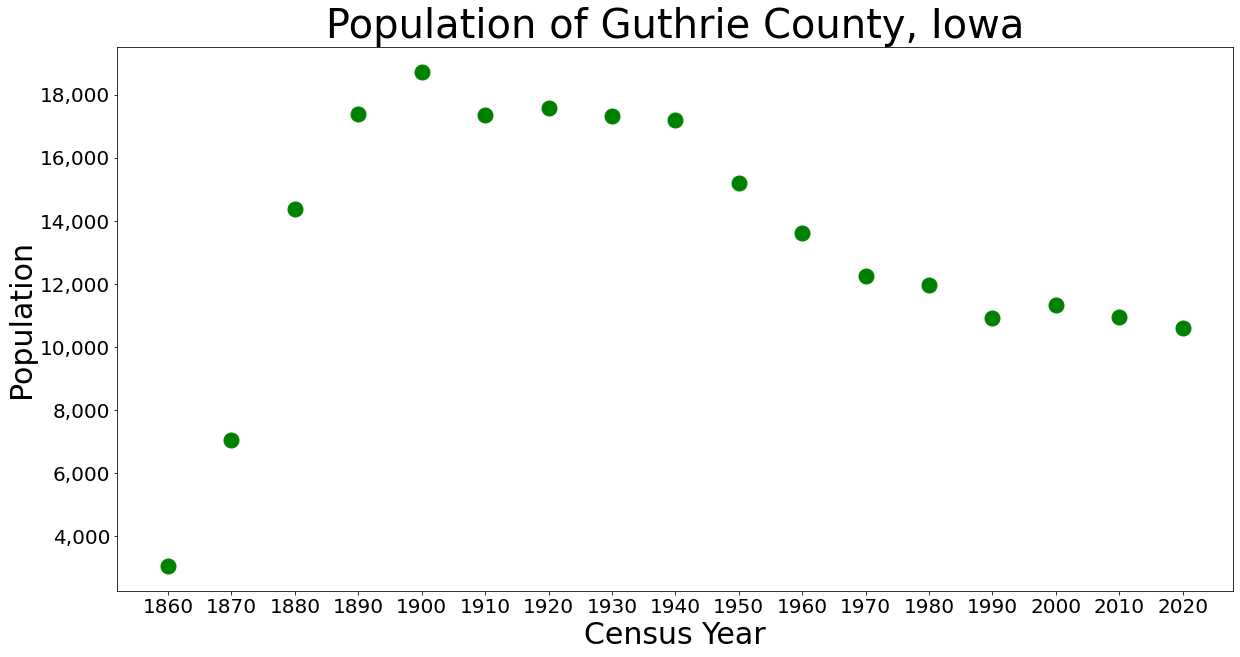
Population of Guthrie County from US census data

=== 2020 census ===
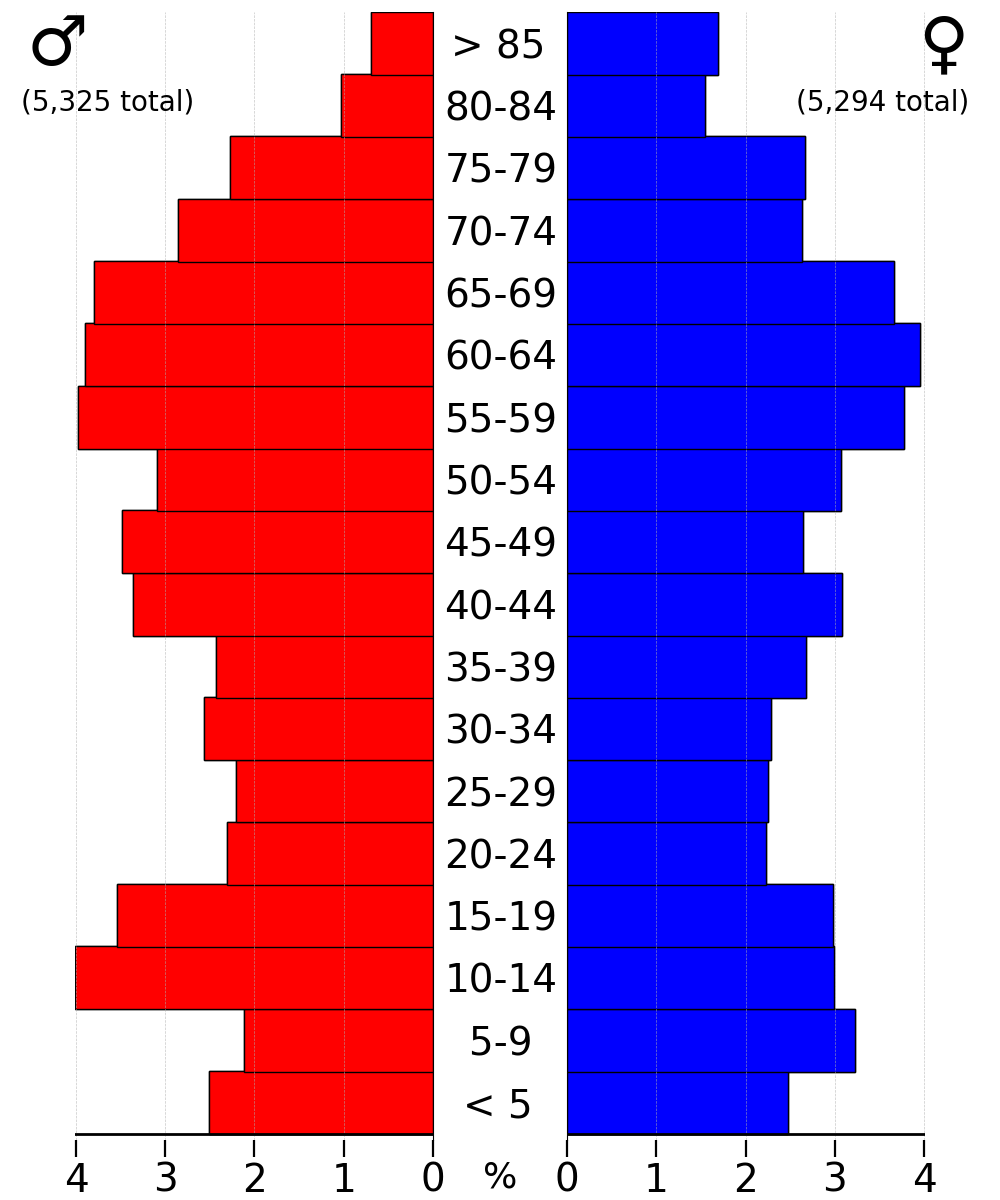
2022 US Census population pyramid for Guthrie County from ACS 5-year estimates

As of the 2020 census, the county had a population of 10,623 and a population density of 17.9/sq mi (6.9/km^{2}). The median age was 46.5 years, 22.5% of residents were under the age of 18, and 23.8% were 65 years of age or older. For every 100 females there were 99.1 males, and for every 100 females age 18 and over there were 97.4 males.

The racial makeup of the county was 94.4% White, 0.3% Black or African American, 0.2% American Indian and Alaska Native, 0.4% Asian, 0.2% Native Hawaiian and Pacific Islander, 1.4% from some other race, and 3.1% from two or more races. Hispanic or Latino residents of any race comprised 2.6% of the population. 96.86% of the population reported being of one race, and 91.86% were non-Hispanic White.

Less than 0.1% of residents lived in urban areas, while 100.0% lived in rural areas.

There were 4,529 households in the county, of which 26.3% had children under the age of 18 living in them. Of all households, 54.1% were married-couple households, 18.1% were households with a male householder and no spouse or partner present, and 21.8% were households with a female householder and no spouse or partner present. About 29.5% of all households were made up of individuals and 15.0% had someone living alone who was 65 years of age or older.

Of the 5,773 housing units, 4,529 were occupied, leaving 21.5% vacant. Among occupied housing units, 80.8% were owner-occupied and 19.2% were renter-occupied. The homeowner vacancy rate was 3.6% and the rental vacancy rate was 12.4%.

=== 2010 census ===
The 2010 census recorded a population of 10,954 in the county, with a population density of 18.5/sq mi (7.2/km^{2}). There were 5,756 housing units, of which 4,544 were occupied.

=== 2000 census ===
At the 2000 census there were 11,353 people, 4,641 households, and 3,248 families in the county. The population density was 19 people per square mile (7.3 people/km^{2}). There were 5,467 housing units at an average density of 9 units per square mile (3.5 units/km^{2}). The racial makeup of the county was 98.61% White, 0.12% Black or African American, 0.05% Native American, 0.14% Asian, 0.04% Pacific Islander, 0.42% from other races, and 0.61% from two or more races. 1.06%. were Hispanic or Latino of any race.

Of the 4,641 households 27.90% had children under the age of 18 living with them, 60.00% were married couples living together, 6.60% had a female householder with no husband present, and 30.00% were non-families. 26.10% of households were one person and 14.10% were one person aged 65 or older. The average household size was 2.39 and the average family size was 2.86.

The age distribution was 23.60% under the age of 18, 6.30% from 18 to 24, 24.80% from 25 to 44, 24.90% from 45 to 64, and 20.50% 65 or older. The median age was 42 years. For every 100 females, there were 97.60 males. For every 100 females age 18 and over, there were 94.30 males.

The median household income was $36,495 and the median family income was $43,601. Males had a median income of $31,018 versus $22,077 for females. The per capita income for the county was $19,726. About 5.80% of families and 8.00% of the population were below the poverty line, including 8.90% of those under age 18 and 8.10% of those age 65 or over.

== Communities ==
=== Cities ===
- Adair
- Bagley
- Bayard
- Casey
- Coon Rapids
- Guthrie Center
- Jamaica
- Menlo
- Panora
- Stuart
- Yale

=== Townships ===
- Baker Township
- Bear Grove Township
- Beaver Township
- Cass Township
- Dodge Township
- Grant Township
- Highland Township
- Jackson Township
- Orange Township
- Penn Township
- Richland Township
- Seely Township
- Stuart Township
- Thompson Township
- Union Township
- Valley Township
- Victory Township

=== Unincorporated communities ===
- Dale City
- Fansler
- Glendon
- Herndon
- Monteith
- Morrisburg
- North Branch
- Wichita

=== Census-designated places ===
- Diamondhead Lake
- Lake Panorama

=== Population ranking ===
The population ranking of the following table is based on the 2020 census of Guthrie County.

† county seat

Rank	City/Town/etc.	Municipal type	Population (2020 Census)
1	† Guthrie Center	City	1,593
2	Lake Panorama	CDP	1,266
3	Panora	City	1,091
4	Stuart (partially in Adair County)	City	1,059 (1,782 total)
5	Bayard	City	405
6	Diamondhead Lake	CDP	371
7	Casey (partially in Adair County)	City	368 (387 total)
8	Menlo	City	345
9	Yale	City	267
10	Bagley	City	233
11	Jamaica	City	195
12	Adair (mostly in Adair County)	City	18 (791 total)
13	Coon Rapids (mostly in Carroll County)	City	0 (1,300 total)

== Politics ==
United States presidential election results for Guthrie County, Iowa
Year	Republican		Democratic		Third party(ies)	
Year	No.	%	No.	%	No.	%
1896	2,541	52.66%	2,220	46.01%	64	1.33%
1900	2,806	59.52%	1,824	38.69%	84	1.78%
1904	2,857	70.54%	1,032	25.48%	161	3.98%
1908	2,560	61.44%	1,532	36.77%	75	1.80%
1912	1,258	30.71%	1,390	33.93%	1,449	35.37%
1916	2,316	55.30%	1,805	43.10%	67	1.60%
1920	5,338	75.19%	1,647	23.20%	114	1.61%
1924	4,314	60.06%	840	11.69%	2,029	28.25%
1928	4,772	67.84%	2,235	31.77%	27	0.38%
1932	2,637	45.37%	3,099	53.32%	76	1.31%
1936	4,155	51.49%	3,619	44.85%	296	3.67%
1940	4,733	57.33%	3,489	42.27%	33	0.40%
1944	4,042	57.93%	2,899	41.55%	36	0.52%
1948	3,389	49.18%	3,392	49.22%	110	1.60%
1952	5,377	70.10%	2,281	29.74%	13	0.17%
1956	4,283	58.91%	2,981	41.00%	6	0.08%
1960	4,046	58.22%	2,896	41.68%	7	0.10%
1964	2,169	35.29%	3,962	64.46%	15	0.24%
1968	3,346	58.18%	2,063	35.87%	342	5.95%
1972	3,655	60.69%	2,258	37.50%	109	1.81%
1976	2,644	46.87%	2,873	50.93%	124	2.20%
1980	3,214	58.29%	1,866	33.84%	434	7.87%
1984	2,783	51.89%	2,517	46.93%	63	1.17%
1988	2,005	40.24%	2,910	58.40%	68	1.36%
1992	1,962	35.98%	2,234	40.97%	1,257	23.05%
1996	2,034	39.57%	2,552	49.65%	554	10.78%
2000	2,840	51.93%	2,493	45.58%	136	2.49%
2004	3,325	55.47%	2,614	43.61%	55	0.92%
2008	3,074	52.56%	2,625	44.88%	150	2.56%
2012	3,171	53.86%	2,569	43.63%	148	2.51%
2016	3,628	63.10%	1,732	30.12%	390	6.78%
2020	4,272	67.05%	1,985	31.16%	114	1.79%
2024	4,446	67.95%	1,974	30.17%	123	1.88%

== See also ==
- National Register of Historic Places listings in Guthrie County, Iowa
- Raccoon River Valley Trail
- Springbrook State Park
