= Diamondhead Lake, Iowa =

- Census-designated place
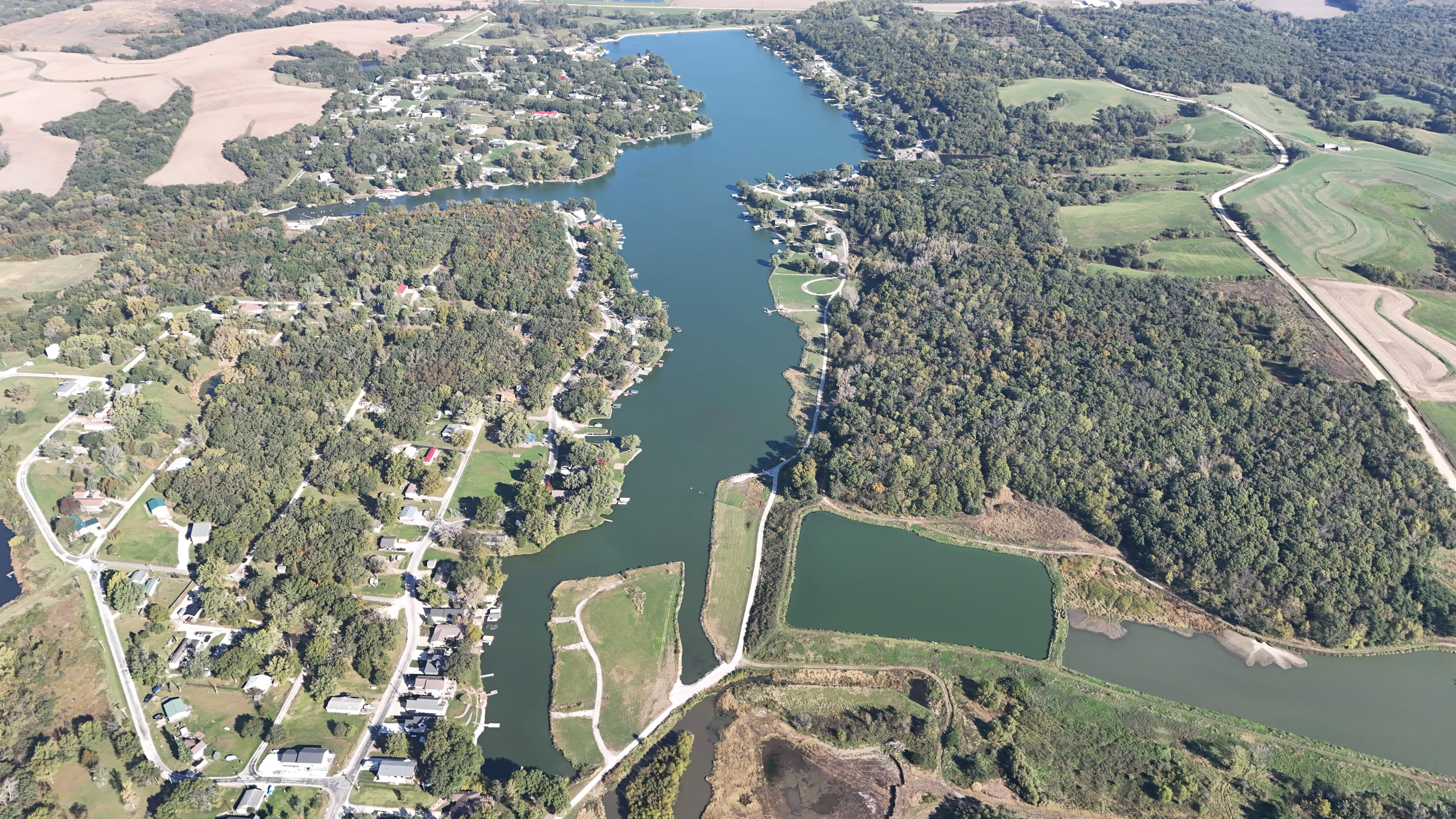
- Looking north across Diamondhead Lake

- Location within Iowa Location within the United States
- Coordinates: 41°33′04″N 94°15′15″W
- Country: United States
- State: Iowa
- County: Guthrie
- Township: Penn

Area
  - Total: 1.13 sq mi (2.93 km^{2})
  - Land: 0.97 sq mi (2.52 km^{2})
  - Water: 0.16 sq mi (0.41 km^{2})
- Elevation: 971 ft (296 m)

Population (2020)
  - Total: 371
  - Density: 381.3/sq mi (147.23/km^{2})
- Time zone: Central (CST)
- FIPS code: 19-21320
- GNIS feature ID: 2629963
- Website: www.diamondheadlakeiowa.com

Diamondhead Lake is an unincorporated community and census-designated place in Penn Township, Guthrie County, Iowa, United States. As of the 2020 census the population was 371.

The CDP consists of a residential community that surrounds Diamondhead Lake, an artificial impoundment just south of the South Raccoon River. The community is located in the southeast corner of Guthrie County, 4 miles (6 km) northwest of Dexter and 6 miles (10 km) northeast of Stuart. It is 38 miles (61 km) west of Des Moines.

According to the U.S. Census Bureau, the CDP has a total area of 0.77 square miles (2.0 km^{2}), of which 0.62 square miles (1.6 km^{2}) are land and 0.15 square miles (0.4 km^{2}), or 20.31%, are the waters of Diamondhead Lake.

== Demographics ==
Historical population
Census	Pop.	Note	%±
2010	366		—
2020	371		1.4%
U.S. Decennial Census

=== 2020 census ===
As of the census of 2020, there were 371 people, 154 households, and 117 families residing in the community. The population density was 381.3 inhabitants per square mile (147.2/km^{2}). There were 226 housing units at an average density of 232.3 per square mile (89.7/km^{2}). The racial makeup of the community was 90.6% White, 0.8% Black or African American, 0.8% Native American, 1.9% Asian, 0.5% Pacific Islander, 0.3% from other races and 5.1% from two or more races. Hispanic or Latino persons of any race comprised 2.4% of the population.

Of the 154 households, 27.3% of which had children under the age of 18 living with them, 69.5% were married couples living together, 3.2% were cohabitating couples, 12.3% had a female householder with no spouse or partner present and 14.9% had a male householder with no spouse or partner present. 24.0% of all households were non-families. 21.4% of all households were made up of individuals, 9.7% had someone living alone who was 65 years old or older.

The median age in the community was 48.9 years. 25.6% of the residents were under the age of 20; 3.0% were between the ages of 20 and 24; 18.1% were from 25 and 44; 31.0% were from 45 and 64; and 22.4% were 65 years of age or older. The gender makeup of the community was 47.7% male and 52.3% female.
