= Beaver Township, Guthrie County, Iowa =

Township in Guthrie County, Iowa, U.S.

Coordinates: 41°34′N 94°25′W

Beaver Township is a township in Guthrie County, Iowa, United States.
