= Adair, Iowa =

- City
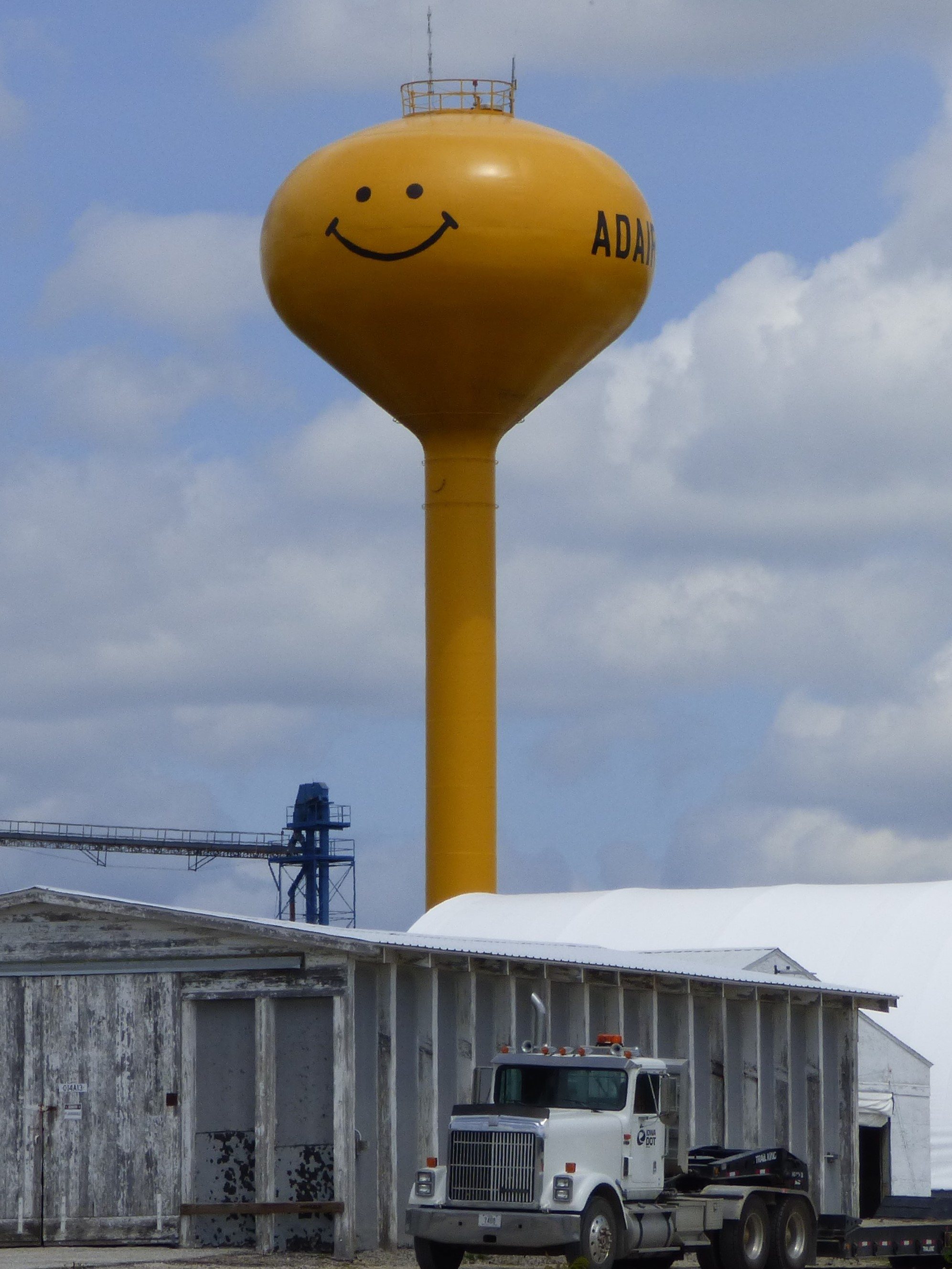
- Water Tower (2018)

- Logo
- Mottoes: "Home of the Bombers", "It'll make you smile!"
- Location in the State of Iowa
- Coordinates: 41°29′50″N 94°38′36″W
- Country: United States
- State: Iowa
- Counties: Adair, Guthrie
- Townships: Summit (Adair County), Grant (Guthrie County)
- Incorporated: August 20, 1872

Area
  - Total: 2.23 sq mi (5.78 km^{2})
  - Land: 2.22 sq mi (5.74 km^{2})
  - Water: 0.015 sq mi (0.04 km^{2})
- Elevation: 1,467 ft (447 m)

Population (2020)
  - Total: 791
  - Density: 357.1/sq mi (137.89/km^{2})
- Time zone: UTC-6 (CST)
  - Summer (DST): UTC-5 (CDT)
- ZIP code: 50002
- Area code: 641
- FIPS code: 19-00370
- GNIS feature ID: 2393880
- Website: adairia.gov

Adair is a city in Adair and Guthrie counties of Iowa in the United States. The population was 791 at the 2020 census.

== History ==
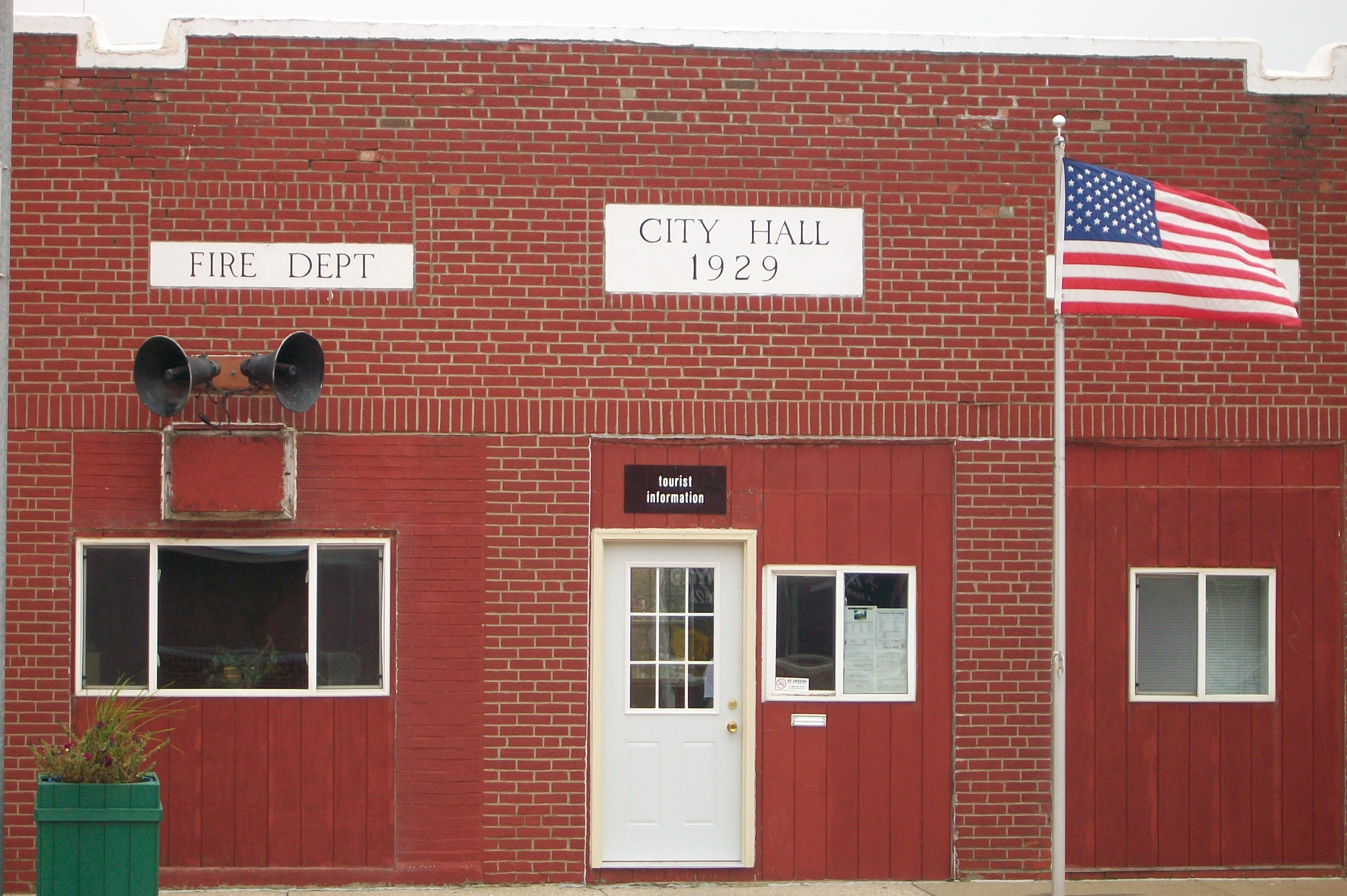
Adair City Hall (2010)

The Rock Island Railroad was built through the area in 1868, which led to the area being known as Summit Cut. This was in reference to the ridge that forms the watershed divide between the Missouri and Mississippi rivers. The town officially became known as Adair on August 20, 1872, when it was incorporated with the county. The town is named after General John Adair, a general in the War of 1812 who later became the eighth governor of Kentucky. Adair was the scene of the first successful train robbery in the American West when on July 21, 1873, the James-Younger Gang (led by Jesse James) took US $3,000 from the Rock Island Express after derailing it southwest of the town. The derailment killed the engineer.

A rare F5 tornado occurred near this town on June 27, 1953, although the damage occurred closer to the town of Anita. One person was killed and two others were injured.

Adair is recognizable from Interstate 80 by its tall yellow "smiley-face" water tower. Its roadsign warmly greets visitors with, "Welcome to Adair; it'll make you smile". Some of the local businesses incorporate the smiley-face tower image into their company logos.

Adair is mentioned in the 2013 Stephen King novel Doctor Sleep.

In February 2024, Adair Police Chief Brad Wendt was convicted on 11 of 15 federal charges, for conspiring to make false statements to the federal Bureau of Alcohol, Tobacco, Firearms and Explosives and illegal possession of a machine gun. "Authorities say he bought machine guns for the police department, then sold them for an almost $80,000 personal profit. Trial evidence showed he bought machine guns for his gun store, including a .50-caliber machine gun he mounted to his own armored Humvee".

== Geography ==
According to the United States Census Bureau, the city has a total area of 2.22 square miles (5.75 km^{2}), of which 2.20 square miles (5.70 km^{2}) is land and 0.02 square miles (0.05 km^{2}) is water.

== Demographics ==
Historical population
Year	Pop.	±%
1870	306	—
1880	722	+135.9%
1890	879	+21.7%
1900	900	+2.4%
1910	952	+5.8%
1920	950	−0.2%
1930	874	−8.0%
1940	827	−5.4%
1950	742	−10.3%
1960	750	+1.1%
1970	883	+17.7%
1980	894	+1.2%
1990	894	+0.0%
2000	839	−6.2%
2010	781	−6.9%
2020	791	+1.3%
Total Population for Iowa's Incorporated Places: 1850-2000; Source: U.S. Decennial Census

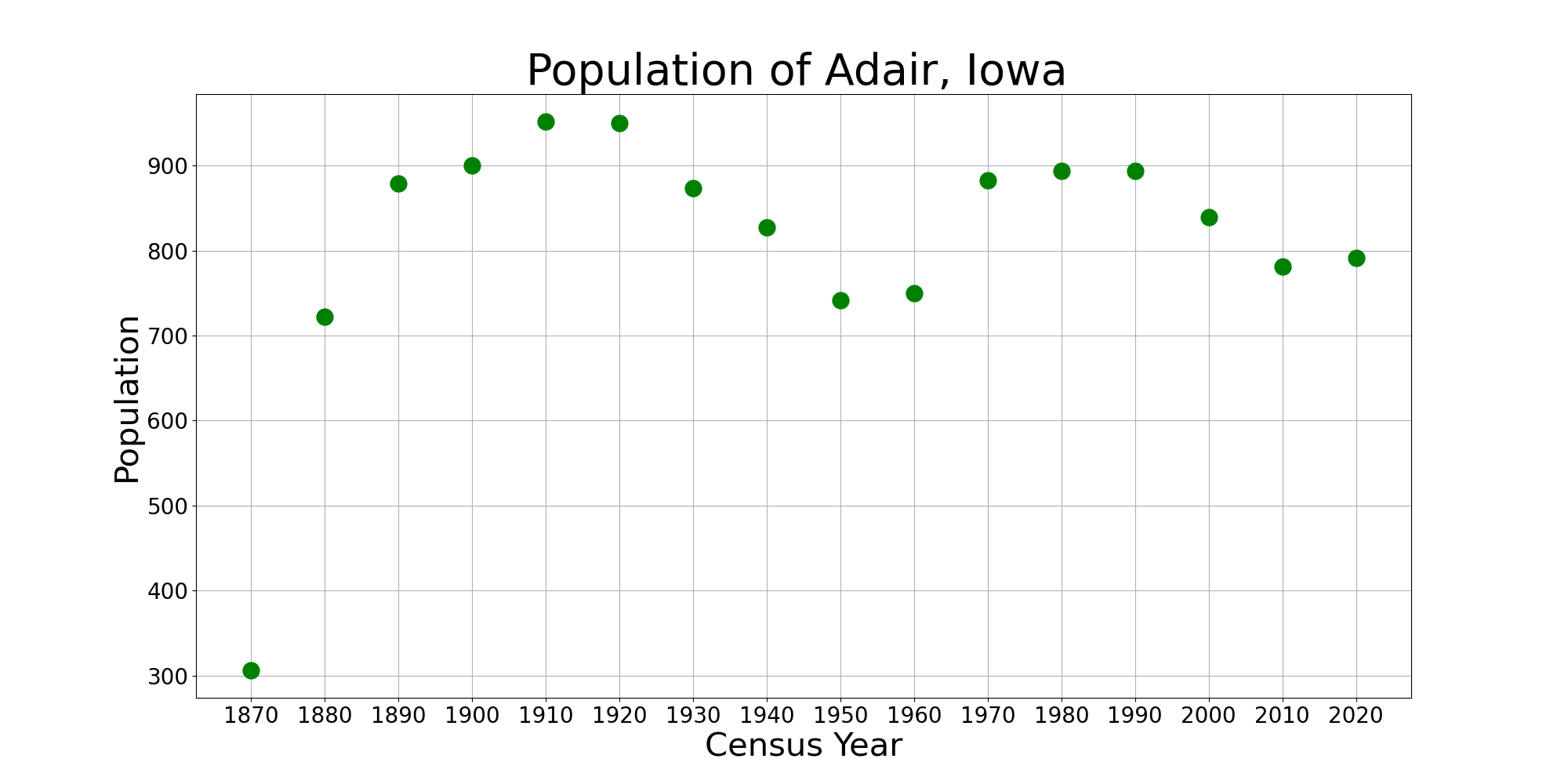
The population of Adair, Iowa from US census data

The Guthrie County portion of Adair is part of the Des Moines metropolitan area.

=== 2020 census ===
As of the census of 2020, there were 791 people, 361 households, and 217 families residing in the city. The population density was 357.1 inhabitants per square mile (137.9/km^{2}). There were 396 housing units at an average density of 178.8 per square mile (69.0/km^{2}). The racial makeup of the city was 93.6% White, 0.8% Black or African American, 0.3% Native American, 0.6% Asian, 0.0% Pacific Islander, 0.4% from other races and 4.4% from two or more races. Hispanic or Latino people of any race comprised 3.4% of the population.

Of the 361 households, 22.2% of which had children under the age of 18 living with them, 45.4% were married couples living together, 6.6% were cohabitating couples, 28.3% had a female householder with no spouse or partner present and 19.7% had a male householder with no spouse or partner present. 39.9% of all households were non-families. 32.1% of all households were made up of individuals, 15.2% had someone living alone who was 65 years old or older.

The median age in the city was 43.8 years. 22.6% of the residents were under the age of 20; 4.0% were between the ages of 20 and 24; 24.7% were from 25 and 44; 29.0% were from 45 and 64; and 19.7% were 65 years of age or older. The gender makeup of the city was 49.7% male and 50.3% female.

=== 2010 census ===
As of the census of 2010, there were 781 people, 361 households, and 208 families living in the city. The population density was 355.0 inhabitants per square mile (137.1/km^{2}). There were 403 housing units at an average density of 183.2 per square mile (70.7/km^{2}). The racial makeup of the city was 98.1% White, 0.1% Native American, 0.5% Asian, 0.8% from other races, and 0.5% from two or more races. Hispanic or Latino of any race were 1.3% of the population.

There were 361 households, of which 24.9% had children under the age of 18 living with them, 48.2% were married couples living together, 7.8% had a female householder with no husband present, 1.7% had a male householder with no wife present, and 42.4% were non-families. 38.8% of all households were made up of individuals, and 19.4% had someone living alone who was 65 years of age or older. The average household size was 2.16 and the average family size was 2.88.

The median age in the city was 41.9 years. 23.2% of residents were under the age of 18; 7.3% were between the ages of 18 and 24; 24.8% were from 25 to 44; 26.9% were from 45 to 64; and 17.8% were 65 years of age or older. The gender makeup of the city was 49.0% male and 51.0% female.

=== 2000 census ===
As of the census of 2000, there were 839 people, 366 households, and 214 families living in the city. The population density was 381.1 inhabitants per square mile (147.1/km^{2}). There were 404 housing units at an average density of 183.5 per square mile (70.8/km^{2}). The racial makeup of the city was 99.05% White, 0.12% Native American, 0.36% Asian, 0.24% from other races, and 0.24% from two or more races. Hispanic or Latino of any race were 1.19% of the population.

There were 366 households, out of which 29.5% had children under the age of 18 living with them, 51.4% were married couples living together, 5.7% had a female householder with no husband present, and 41.5% were non-families. 39.1% of all households were made up of individuals, and 21.0% had someone living alone who was 65 years of age or older. The average household size was 2.97 and the average family size was 3.51.

Age spread: 22.2% under the age of 18, 17.3% from 18 to 24, 24.3% from 25 to 44, 22.5% from 45to 64, and 13.7% who were 65 years of age or older. The median age was 39 years. For every 100 females, there were 97.0 males. For every 100 females age 18 and over, there were 95.5 males.

The median income for a household in the city was $31,319, and the median income for a family was $42,847. Males had a median income of $27,083 versus $22,941 for females. The per capita income for the city was $15,557. About 2.5% of families and 6.5% of the population were below the poverty line, including 6.3% of those under age 18 and 8.6% of those age 65 or over.

== Education ==
Adair is in the Adair–Casey Community School District, and houses Adair–Casey Elementary School and AC/GC Junior High School. Students attend AC/GC High School in Guthrie Center, a school of the Guthrie Center Community School District, under a grade-sharing arrangement.
