= Union Township, Guthrie County, Iowa =

Township in Iowa, USA

Coordinates: 41°44′N 94°41′W

Union Township is a township in Guthrie County, Iowa, United States.
