= Summit Township, Adair County, Iowa =

Township in Iowa, US

Summit Township, Adair County
- Township
- Coordinates: 41°27′45″N 094°38′29″W
- Country: United States
- State: Iowa
- County: Adair

Area
  - Total: 35.59 sq mi (92.18 km^{2})
  - Land: 35.54 sq mi (92.04 km^{2})
  - Water: 0.054 sq mi (0.14 km^{2})
- Elevation: 1,375 ft (419 m)

Population (2010)
  - Total: 967
  - Density: 27/sq mi (10.5/km^{2})
- Time zone: UTC-6 (CST)
  - Summer (DST): UTC-5 (CDT)
- FIPS code: 19-94035
- GNIS feature ID: 0468760

Summit Township is one of seventeen townships in Adair County, Iowa, USA. At the 2010 census, its population was 967.

== History ==
Summit Township was organized in 1871. Summit is named from the ridge it contains that forms the watershed between the Mississippi and Missouri rivers.

A post office named Linwood opened in March 1895. Henry L. Manion was the postmaster. This post office was in Summit Township and was discontinued in 1903.

== Geography ==
Summit Township covers an area of 35.59 square miles (92.2 km^{2}) and contains one incorporated settlement, Adair. According to the USGS, it contains two cemeteries: Saint Johns and Sunny Hill.
