= Glendon, Iowa =

- Unincorporated community
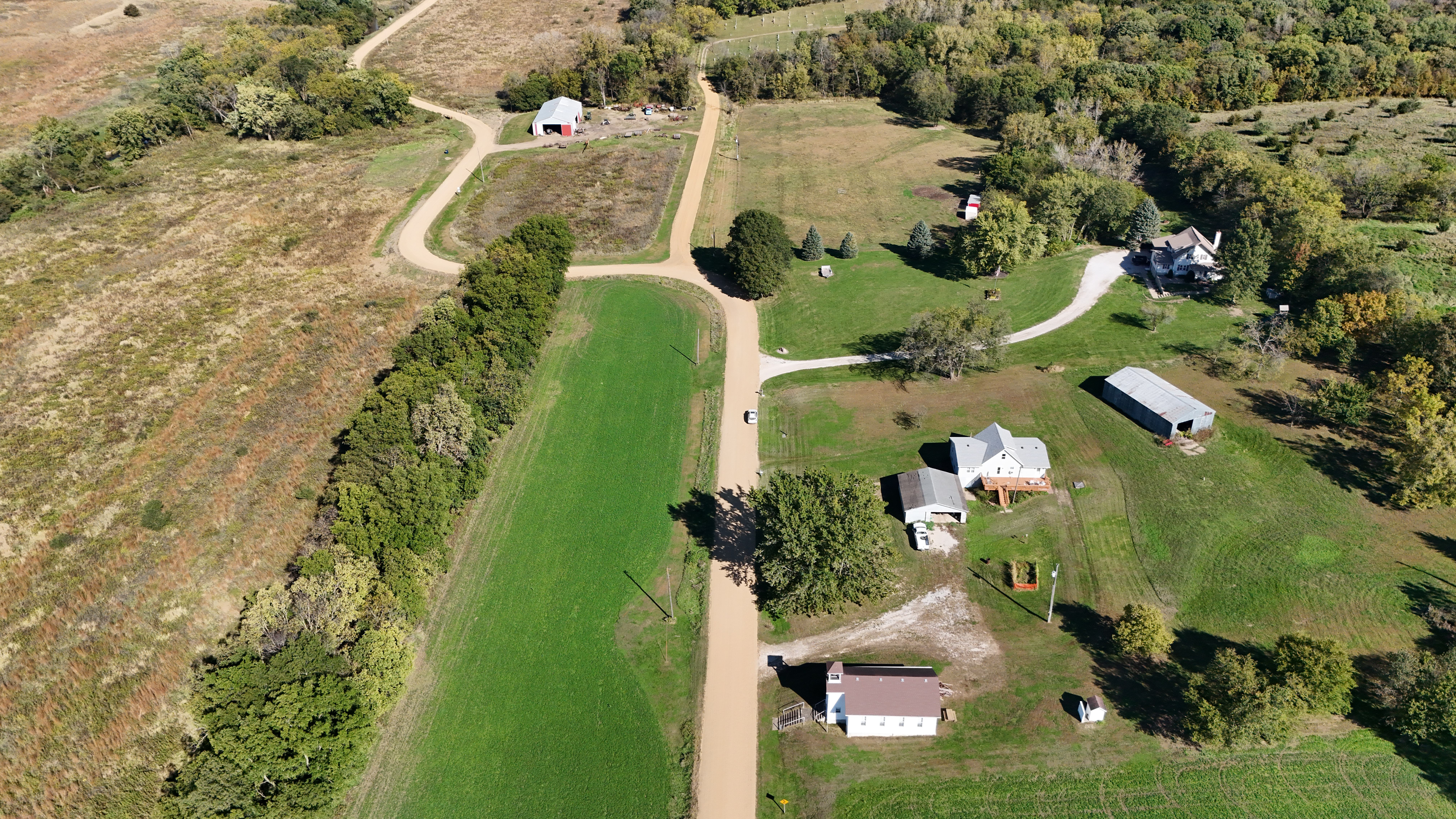
- Looking north as River Trail Road passes through Glendon

- Location within Iowa
- Coordinates: 41°35′40″N 94°24′08″W
- Country: United States
- State: Iowa
- County: Guthrie
- Elevation: 1,043 ft (318 m)
- Time zone: UTC-6 (Central (CST))
  - Summer (DST): UTC-5 (CDT)
- Area code: 641
- GNIS feature ID: 456926

Glendon is an unincorporated community in Guthrie County, Iowa, United States. Glendon is located at 41°35′40″N 94°24′08″W.

== History ==
Glendon was platted in 1880. The population of the community was 61 in 1925. The population was 51 in 1940.
