= Monteith, Iowa =

- Unincorporated community
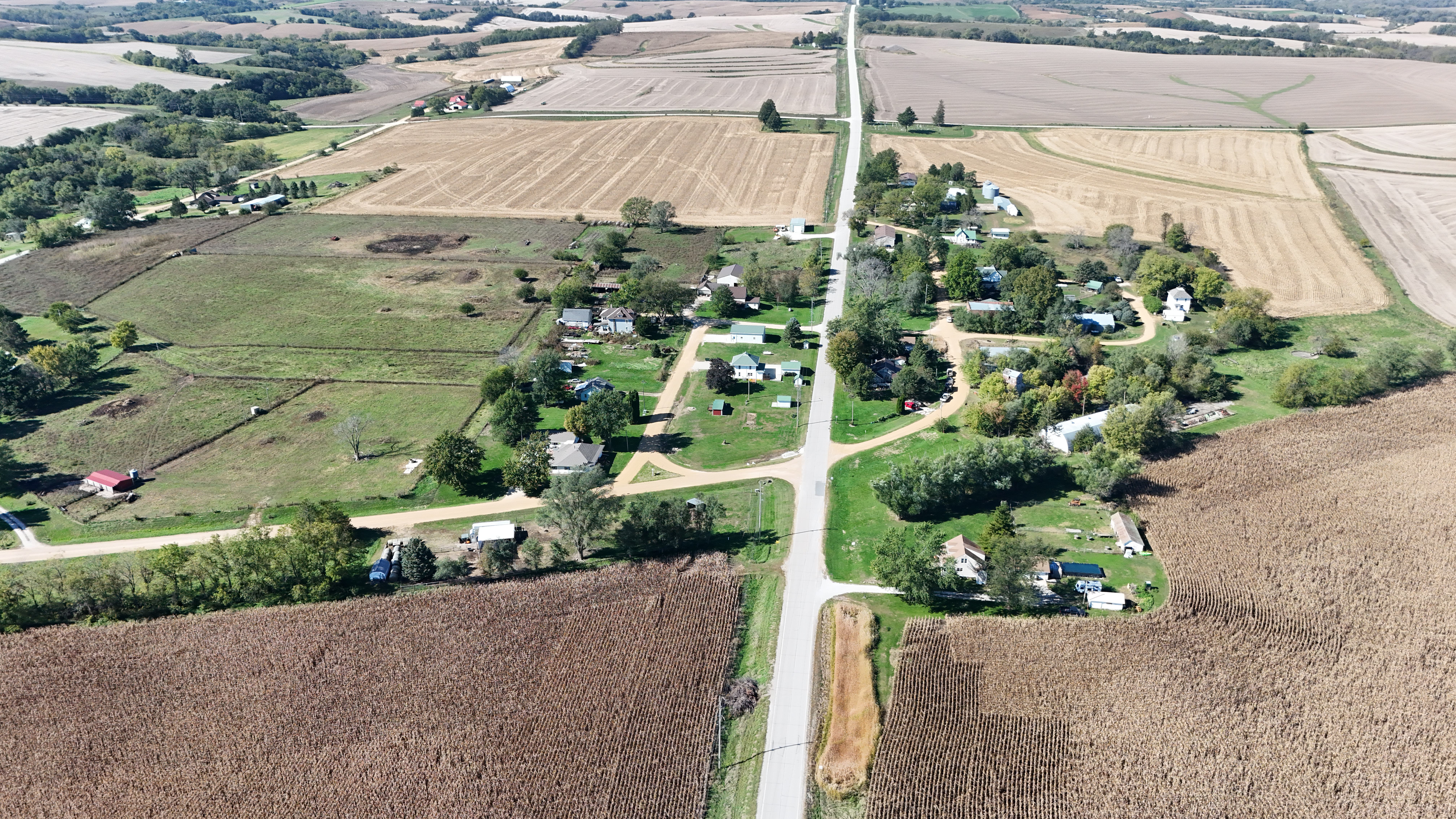
- Looking west along Monteith Road passing through Monteith

- Location within Iowa
- Coordinates: 41°37′53″N 94°25′43″W
- Country: United States
- State: Iowa
- County: Guthrie
- Elevation: 1,060 ft (320 m)
- Time zone: UTC-6 (Central (CST))
  - Summer (DST): UTC-5 (CDT)
- Area code: 641
- GNIS feature ID: 459189

Monteith is an unincorporated community in Guthrie County, Iowa, United States.

== History ==
Monteith got its start in the year 1881, following construction of the railroad through the territory. Monteith's population was 57 in 1902, and 78 in 1925. The population was 78 in 1940.
