= Thomas William Duncan =

Thomas William Duncan (August 15, 1905 – September 15, 1987) was an American writer of circus novels, the most famous of which was Gus the Great (1947).

Born in Casey, Iowa, Duncan was educated at the Drake University and Harvard University. He taught and worked as Director of Public Relations at Grinnell College (from 1942 to 1944).

He was married to Actea Carolyn Young.

He died at the age of 82, in Las Cruces, New Mexico, and was buried in an unmarked grave. His Wife, Actea, died three years later. Their graves were unmarked until July 22, 2015.

== Novels ==
- O Chautauqua (1935)
- "We Pluck This Flower" (1937)
- Ring Horse (1940)
- Gus the Great (1947)
- Big River, Big Man (1959). In 1967 a German translation by Manja Wilkens was published as Mississippi Sinfonie - Menschen am großen Strom.
- Virgo Descending (1961)
- The Labyrinth (1967)
- The Sky and Tomorrow (1974)
