= Baker Township, Guthrie County, Iowa =

Township in Guthrie County, Iowa, U.S.

Coordinates: 41.6450°N 94.5716°W

Baker Township is a township in Guthrie County, Iowa, United States.
