= Highland Township, Guthrie County, Iowa =

Township in Guthrie County, Iowa, U.S.

Coordinates: 41°49′N 94°34′W

Highland Township is a township in Guthrie County, Iowa, United States.
