= Guthrie County Courthouse (Iowa) =

Building in Guthrie Center, Iowa, United States

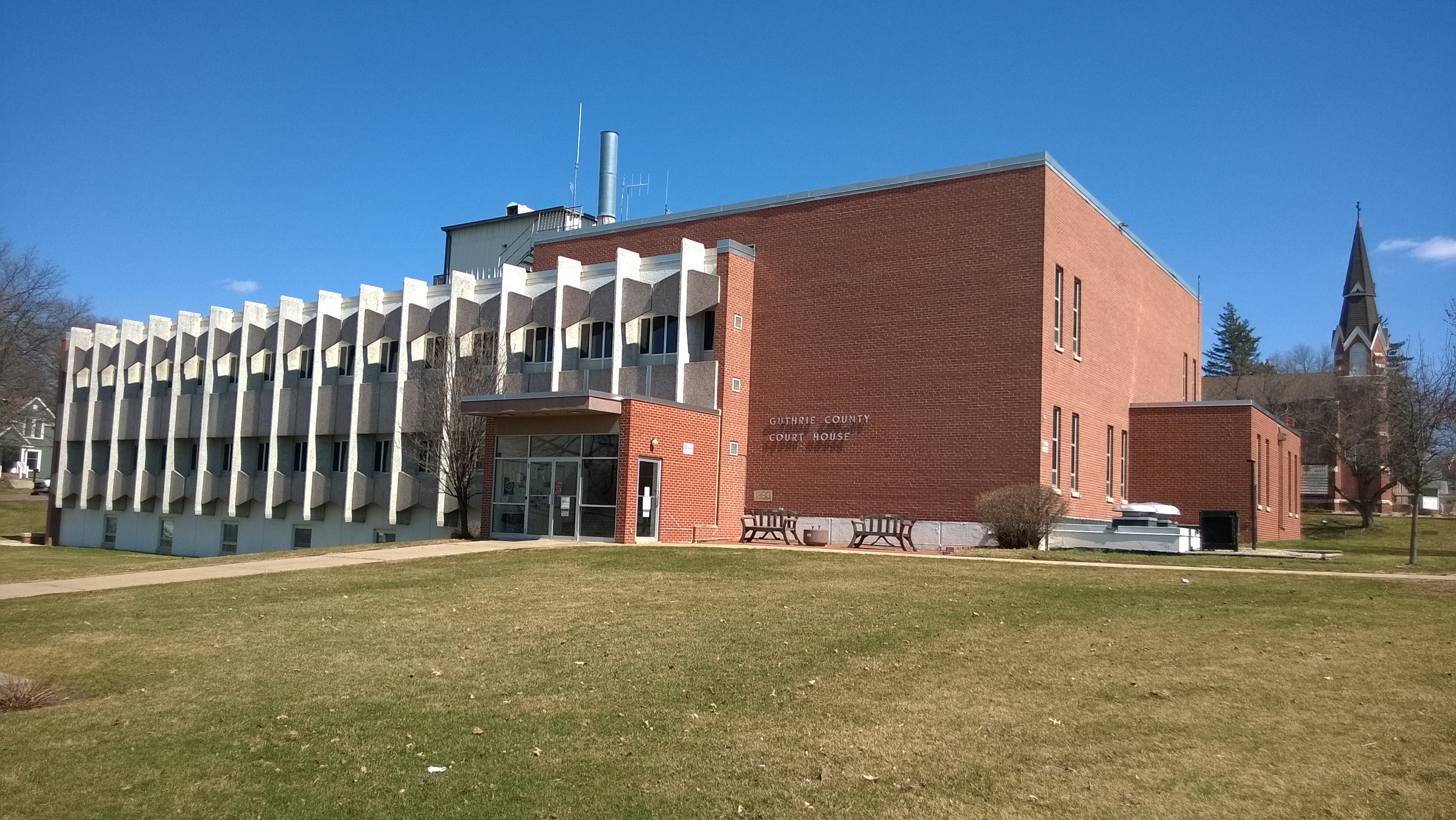
- Guthrie County Courthouse
- Interactive map of the Guthrie County Courthouse area

General information
- Type: Courthouse
- Architectural style: Modern
- Location: 200 N. 5th St., Guthrie Center, Iowa, United States
- Coordinates: 41.678580°N 94.501807°W
- Completed: 1964

Technical details
- Floor count: Three

The Guthrie County Courthouse is located in Guthrie Center, Iowa, United States. The current facility is the fourth structure in Guthrie Center to house county administration and court functions since 1859.

== History ==
Prior to 1859, Panora was the county seat and the county clerk housed the records in his log cabin as there was no courthouse. He sold whiskey and gunpowder from the same building, and in 1857, he accidentally ignited a keg of gunpowder destroying the cabin and all its contents. An order for a courthouse had been issued in 1853, but it had not been built. Another order was issued in 1857, but it was annulled and the contractor was paid $200 in damages. A series of county seat battles ensued between Panora and Guthrie Center with each taking turns as the victor.

The first courthouse for the county was a two-story frame building of native wood built in Panora in 1859. The building was subsequently removed from the center of the public square and it was replaced by a high school. The building itself became an agriculture warehouse. A new brick courthouse that was capped with a dome was completed in 1877 in Guthrie Center. The $22,500 building was paid for by the sale of swamp land in the county. On March 3, 1882, it was destroyed by fire. A clerk saved the county records. The following year, the third courthouse, a three-story, brick Renaissance Revival structure, was built, featuring cut-stone facings and trim. The construction cost was $25,000. This building would serve the county for 80 years. In 1963, the fourth courthouse was under construction in the courtyard next to the third courthouse when the older building was destroyed by fire on November 27, 1963. Luckily some of the records had already been removed from the old building so the loss wasn't as great as prior fires.

The present courthouse is a three-story building that occupies a sloped site exposing the northern part of the ground level. The structure is modern in design and faced with red brick and accented by precast concrete panels. It was completed in 1964 at a total cost of $417,000 and its dedication was held on June 12, 1965.
