= Victory Township, Guthrie County, Iowa =

Township in Guthrie County, Iowa, U.S.

Coordinates: 41°44′N 94°27′W

Victory Township is a township in Guthrie County, Iowa, United States.
