= Morrisburg, Iowa =

- Former community
- Location within Iowa Location within the United States
- Coordinates: 41°36′00″N 94°19′05″W
- Country: United States
- State: Iowa
- County: Guthrie
- Elevation: 1,158 ft (353 m)
- Time zone: UTC-6 (Central (CST))
  - Summer (DST): UTC-5 (CDT)
- Area code: 641
- GNIS feature ID: 465439

Morrisburg is a ghost town in Guthrie County, Iowa, United States.

== History ==
Morrisburg (historically spelled Morrisburgh) was laid out in 1855 by James Moore and Jonathan J. Morris. The town was originally called Fairview, but the name was changed in 1856 when it was discovered that there was already a Fairview in Iowa.
