= Penn Township, Guthrie County, Iowa =

Township in Guthrie County, Iowa, U.S.

Coordinates: 41°32′N 94°18′W

Penn Township is a township in Guthrie County, Iowa, United States.
