= Cass Township, Guthrie County, Iowa =

Township in Guthrie County, Iowa, U.S.

Coordinates: 41°42′N 94°20′W

Cass Township is a township in Guthrie County, Iowa, United States.
