= Thompson Township, Guthrie County, Iowa =

Township in Guthrie County, Iowa, U.S.

Coordinates: 41°33′N 94°32′W

Thompson Township is a township in Guthrie County, Iowa, United States.
