= Grant Township, Guthrie County, Iowa =

Coordinates: 41°33′N 94°39′W

Grant Township
- Interactive map of Grant Township
- Country: United States
- State: Iowa
- Administrative district: Guthrie County

Population (2020)
  - Total: 188
- Time zone: UTC−6 (CST)
  - Summer (DST): UTC−5 (CDT)

Grant Township is a township in Guthrie County, Iowa, United States.

== History ==
The first white settler in what is now Grant Township was John Wickersham, who settled there briefly in 1857; Joel E. James permanently settled there the following year. By 1868, four families lived in the area. Grant Township was organized in October 1869, split off from Thompson Township. The first schoolhouse in the township was constructed in 1866. By 1875, Grant Township had 222 residents; by 1882, there were 8 schools in the township.

The township's German citizens were reported to be very loyal to the United States during World War I.

The township had a population of 261 in 2000, and 188 in 2020.
