= Guthrie Center, Iowa =

- City
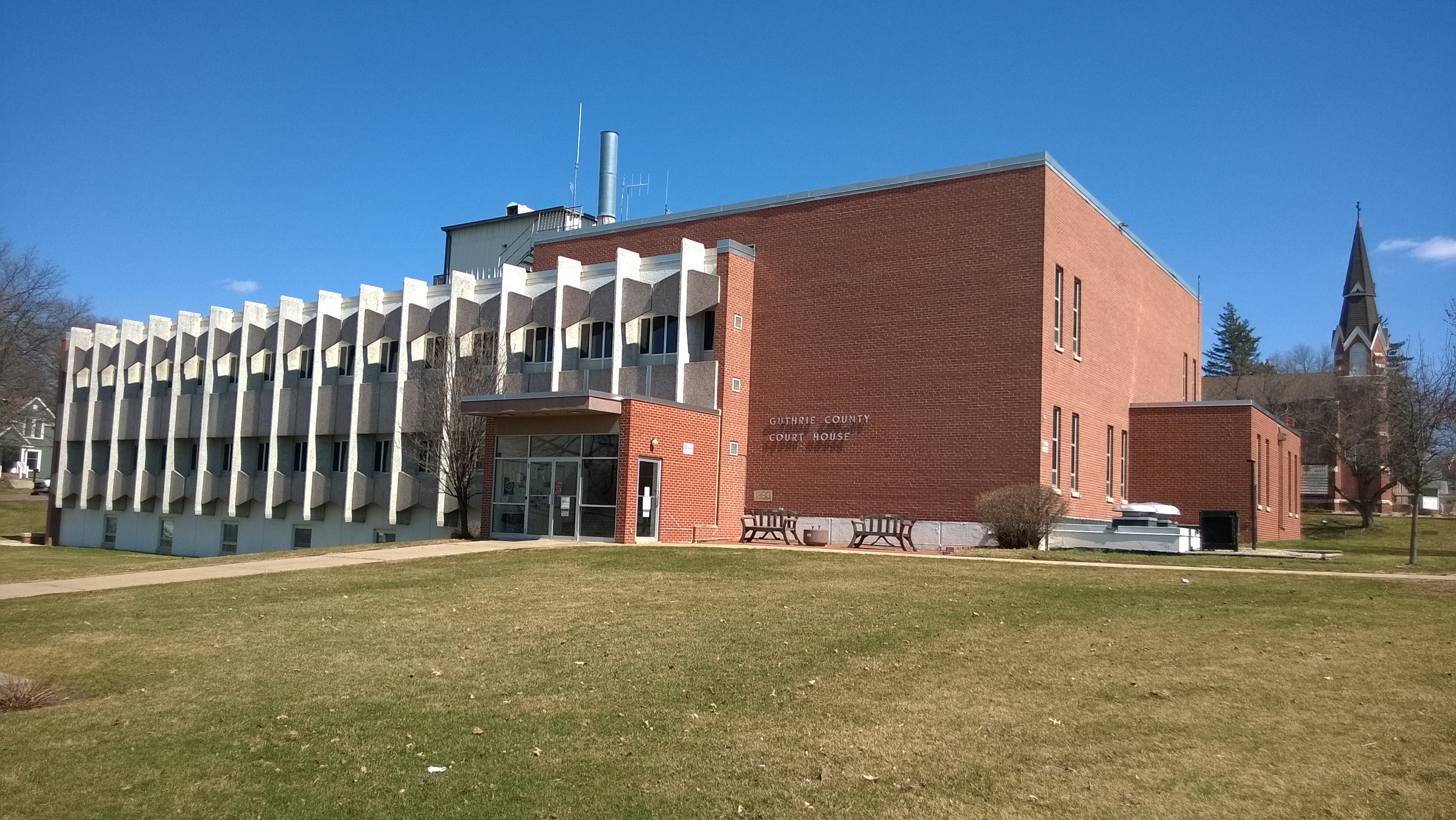
- Guthrie County Courthouse

- Location of Guthrie Center, Iowa
- Coordinates: 41°40′40″N 94°30′12″W
- Country: United States
- State: Iowa
- County: Guthrie

Area
  - Total: 2.38 sq mi (6.16 km^{2})
  - Land: 2.38 sq mi (6.16 km^{2})
  - Water: 0 sq mi (0.00 km^{2})
- Elevation: 1,132 ft (345 m)

Population (2020)
  - Total: 1,593
  - Density: 669.7/sq mi (258.59/km^{2})
- Time zone: UTC-6 (Central (CST))
  - Summer (DST): UTC-5 (CDT)
- ZIP code: 50115
- Area code: 641
- FIPS code: 19-33420
- GNIS feature ID: 2394261
- Website: www.guthriecenter.com

Guthrie Center is a city in Guthrie County, Iowa, United States, along the South Raccoon River. The population was 1,593 at the time of the 2020 census. It is the county seat of Guthrie County.

Guthrie Center is part of the Des Moines metropolitan area.

== History ==
Guthrie Center was platted in 1856. It was named for Capt. Edwin B. Guthrie who was the first justice of the peace at Fort Madison, fought as a volunteer in the Mexican War and, on June 20, 1847, was wounded defending material and more than $350,000 in gold and silver coin. The railroad was built through the settlement in 1879. Guthrie Center was incorporated in 1880.

== Geography ==
According to the United States Census Bureau, the city has a total area of 2.47 square miles (6.40 km^{2}), all of it land.

=== Climate ===
According to the Köppen Climate Classification system, Guthrie Center has a hot-summer humid continental climate, abbreviated "Dfa" on climate maps.

Climate data for Guthrie Center, Iowa, 1991–2020 normals, extremes 1895–present
Month	Jan	Feb	Mar	Apr	May	Jun	Jul	Aug	Sep	Oct	Nov	Dec	Year
Record high °F (°C)	68 (20)	77 (25)	89 (32)	96 (36)	107 (42)	106 (41)	113 (45)	113 (45)	102 (39)	96 (36)	83 (28)	72 (22)	113 (45)
Mean maximum °F (°C)	51.8 (11.0)	57.7 (14.3)	73.2 (22.9)	83.7 (28.7)	89.8 (32.1)	93.8 (34.3)	95.2 (35.1)	93.6 (34.2)	90.7 (32.6)	84.7 (29.3)	69.2 (20.7)	56.5 (13.6)	96.8 (36.0)
Mean daily maximum °F (°C)	29.7 (−1.3)	34.6 (1.4)	47.5 (8.6)	61.0 (16.1)	71.8 (22.1)	81.7 (27.6)	85.1 (29.5)	82.7 (28.2)	76.6 (24.8)	63.6 (17.6)	47.7 (8.7)	34.9 (1.6)	59.7 (15.4)
Daily mean °F (°C)	19.6 (−6.9)	24.2 (−4.3)	36.5 (2.5)	48.7 (9.3)	60.1 (15.6)	70.4 (21.3)	74.1 (23.4)	71.2 (21.8)	63.5 (17.5)	50.7 (10.4)	36.8 (2.7)	25.3 (−3.7)	48.4 (9.1)
Mean daily minimum °F (°C)	9.6 (−12.4)	13.8 (−10.1)	25.5 (−3.6)	36.3 (2.4)	48.4 (9.1)	59.0 (15.0)	63.0 (17.2)	59.8 (15.4)	50.4 (10.2)	37.7 (3.2)	26.0 (−3.3)	15.6 (−9.1)	37.1 (2.8)
Mean minimum °F (°C)	−15.1 (−26.2)	−9.4 (−23.0)	3.8 (−15.7)	19.5 (−6.9)	31.6 (−0.2)	43.6 (6.4)	50.1 (10.1)	47.6 (8.7)	33.1 (0.6)	20.5 (−6.4)	7.4 (−13.7)	−6.6 (−21.4)	−19.0 (−28.3)
Record low °F (°C)	−35 (−37)	−35 (−37)	−29 (−34)	7 (−14)	19 (−7)	35 (2)	40 (4)	36 (2)	19 (−7)	0 (−18)	−16 (−27)	−31 (−35)	−35 (−37)
Average precipitation inches (mm)	0.89 (23)	1.18 (30)	1.88 (48)	4.11 (104)	5.30 (135)	5.23 (133)	4.32 (110)	4.52 (115)	3.61 (92)	2.81 (71)	1.88 (48)	1.41 (36)	37.14 (945)
Average snowfall inches (cm)	5.6 (14)	5.4 (14)	4.8 (12)	1.0 (2.5)	0.0 (0.0)	0.0 (0.0)	0.0 (0.0)	0.0 (0.0)	0.0 (0.0)	0.4 (1.0)	1.6 (4.1)	7.1 (18)	25.9 (65.6)
Average precipitation days (≥ 0.01 in)	4.3	3.8	5.7	9.4	11.0	10.2	8.9	8.6	7.0	7.0	5.7	4.8	86.4
Average snowy days (≥ 0.1 in)	3.4	2.7	1.4	0.5	0.0	0.0	0.0	0.0	0.0	0.1	1.1	3.3	12.5
Source 1: NOAA (precip/snow days, and average precipitation 1981–2010)
Source 2: National Weather Service (mean maxima and minima 1981–2010)

== Demographics ==
Historical populations
Year	Pop.	±%
1880	571	—
1890	1,037	+81.6%
1900	1,193	+15.0%
1910	1,337	+12.1%
1920	1,727	+29.2%
1930	1,813	+5.0%
1940	2,066	+14.0%
1950	2,042	−1.2%
1960	2,071	+1.4%
1970	1,834	−11.4%
1980	1,713	−6.6%
1990	1,614	−5.8%
2000	1,668	+3.3%
2010	1,569	−5.9%
2020	1,593	+1.5%
Source:"U.S. Census website". United States Census Bureau. and Iowa Data Center; Source: U.S. Decennial Census

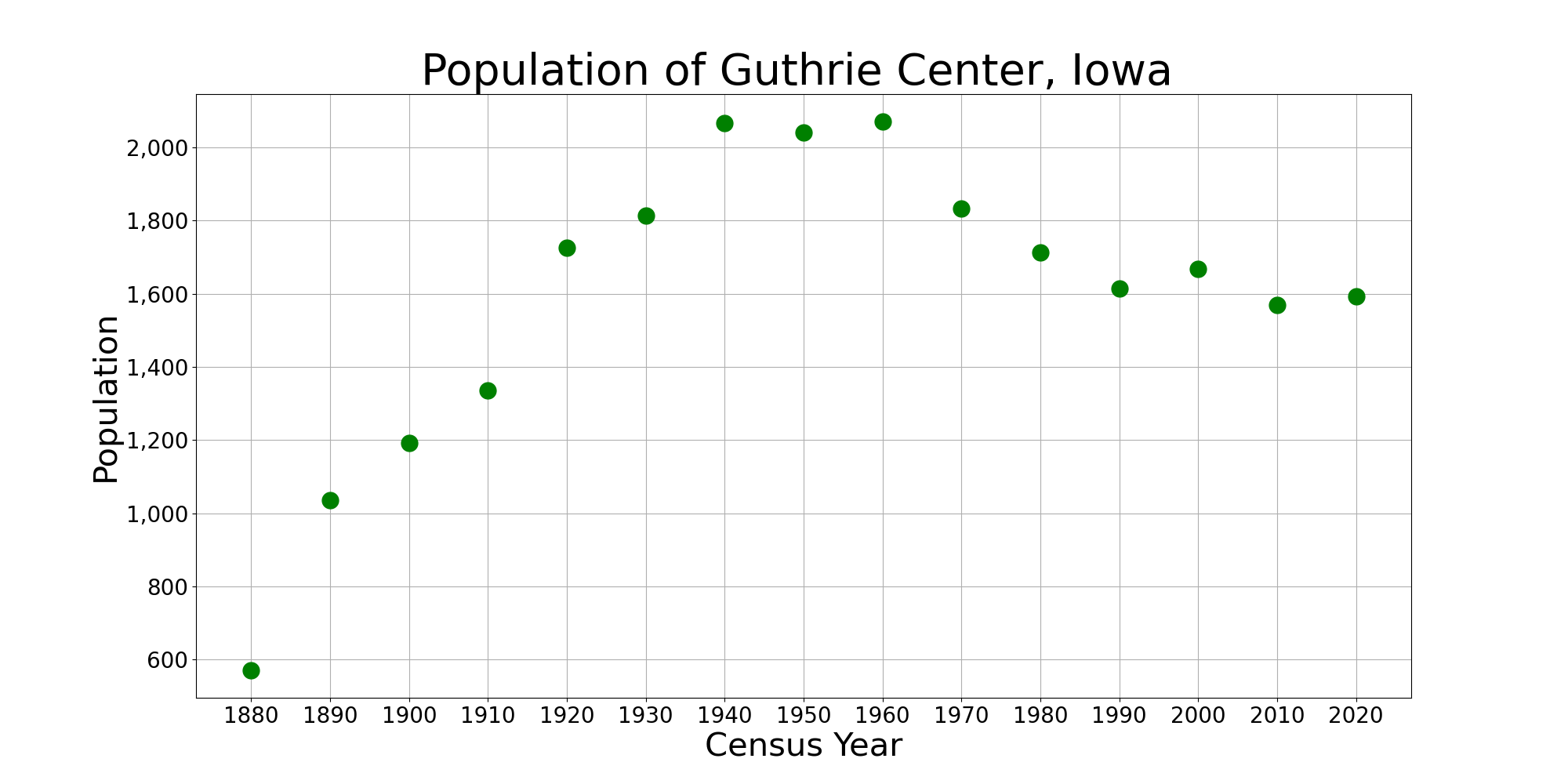
The population of Guthrie Center, Iowa from US census data

=== 2020 census ===
As of the 2020 census, Guthrie Center had a population of 1,593. There were 699 households and 394 families residing in the city. The median age was 44.6 years. 22.2% of residents were under the age of 18 and 25.6% of residents were 65 years of age or older. Of the population, 23.9% were under the age of 20, 4.4% were from 20 to 24, 22.0% were from 25 to 44, 24.1% were from 45 to 64, and 25.6% were 65 years of age or older. For every 100 females there were 92.9 males, and for every 100 females age 18 and over there were 86.9 males age 18 and over.

The population density was 669.7 inhabitants per square mile (258.6/km^{2}). There were 848 housing units at an average density of 356.5 per square mile (137.7/km^{2}). Of all housing units, 17.6% were vacant. The homeowner vacancy rate was 4.0% and the rental vacancy rate was 16.7%.

0.0% of residents lived in urban areas, while 100.0% lived in rural areas.

There were 699 households in Guthrie Center, of which 25.3% had children under the age of 18 living in them. Of all households, 41.1% were married-couple households, 6.2% were cohabiting-couple households, 20.2% were households with a male householder and no spouse or partner present, and 32.6% were households with a female householder and no spouse or partner present. About 43.6% of households were non-families, 37.9% of all households were made up of individuals, and 20.2% had someone living alone who was 65 years of age or older.

Racial composition as of the 2020 census
Race	Number	Percent
White	1,462	91.8%
Black or African American	15	0.9%
American Indian and Alaska Native	2	0.1%
Asian	13	0.8%
Native Hawaiian and Other Pacific Islander	3	0.2%
Some other race	39	2.4%
Two or more races	59	3.7%
Hispanic or Latino (of any race)	66	4.1%

=== 2010 census ===
As of the census of 2010, there were 1,569 people, 677 households, and 387 families residing in the city. The population density was 635.2 inhabitants per square mile (245.3/km^{2}). There were 796 housing units at an average density of 322.3 per square mile (124.4/km^{2}). The racial makeup of the city was 96.0% White, 0.1% African American, 0.4% Native American, 0.2% Asian, 0.1% Pacific Islander, 2.2% from other races, and 0.9% from two or more races. Hispanic or Latino of any race were 3.6% of the population.

There were 677 households, of which 26.3% had children under the age of 18 living with them, 45.2% were married couples living together, 7.8% had a female householder with no husband present, 4.1% had a male householder with no wife present, and 42.8% were non-families. 38.0% of all households were made up of individuals, and 21.6% had someone living alone who was 65 years of age or older. The average household size was 2.22 and the average family size was 2.96.

The median age in the city was 44.9 years. 23.1% of residents were under the age of 18; 6.4% were between the ages of 18 and 24; 20.9% were from 25 to 44; 24% were from 45 to 64; and 25.7% were 65 years of age or older. The gender makeup of the city was 46.6% male and 53.4% female.

=== 2000 census ===
As of the census of 2000, there were 1,668 people, 726 households, and 453 families residing in the city. The population density was 676.0 inhabitants per square mile (261.0/km^{2}). There were 830 housing units at an average density of 336.4 per square mile (129.9/km^{2}). The racial makeup of the city was 98.32% White, 0.06% African American, 0.06% Native American, 0.06% Asian, 1.02% from other races, and 0.48% from two or more races. Hispanic or Latino of any race were 1.32% of the population.

There were 726 households, out of which 27.7% had children under the age of 18 living with them, 49.9% were married couples living together, 9.0% had a female householder with no husband present, and 37.6% were non-families. 34.2% of all households were made up of individuals, and 22.2% had someone living alone who was 65 years of age or older. The average household size was 2.21 and the average family size was 2.80.

Age spread: 24.2% under the age of 18, 5.4% from 18 to 24, 22.7% from 25 to 44, 21.2% from 45 to 64, and 26.6% who were 65 years of age or older. The median age was 43 years. For every 100 females, there were 82.3 males. For every 100 females age 18 and over, there were 77.7 males.

The median income for a household in the city was $30,714, and the median income for a family was $42,308. Males had a median income of $30,446 versus $21,940 for females. The per capita income for the city was $16,662. About 6.3% of families and 7.7% of the population were below the poverty line, including 7.8% of those under age 18 and 10.7% of those age 65 or over.

== Education ==
The Guthrie Center Community School District operates public schools:

- Guthrie Center Elementary School
- AC/GC High School

Under a grade-sharing arrangement with the Adair–Casey Community School District, students attend AC/GC Junior High School in Adair.

== Notable people ==
- James Ellison, actor
- Bridget Flanery, actress
- Jim Flanery, Creighton University women's basketball coach
- Coleman Griffith, pioneer of sports psychology
- Jack Laughery (1935–2006), CEO of Hardee's from 1975 to 1990
- John Taggart, poet
