= Raccoon River Valley Trail =

Rail trail in Iowa, United States

Raccoon River Valley Trail (RRVT) is a rail trail running 56 miles (90 km) from Waukee, Iowa, to Jefferson, Iowa. In 2013, an additional 33.1-mile (53.3 km) north loop was completed on the RRVT, making the RRVT nearly 90 miles (140 km) of paved trails and having a paved interior loop of more than 72 miles (116 km). The 39-mile (63 km) portion of the trail from Waukee to Herndon is part of the American Discovery Trail, which runs between Cape Henlopen State Park in Delaware and Point Reyes near the Bay Area of California. In Iowa, the American Discovery Trail will be concurrent with U.S. Bicycle Route 50 (see United States Numbered Bicycle Routes).

The recreational trail runs through the counties of Polk, Dallas, Guthrie, and Greene in Iowa. It is a paved trail, mainly asphalt, (Note: During the spring and summer of 2020, the 10-mile (16 km) section of the trail between Adel and Redfield had most bridges replaced and widened and the trail paved surface was widened and replaced with a new asphalt overlay.) though three sections are concrete. One concrete section extends from Jefferson south for four miles (6 km). Another concrete section is an eighteen-mile (30 km) section connecting Redfield, Linden, Panora, and Yale. (Note: On Thursday, June 13, 2024, the 6-mile (9.7 km) section of the trail between Linden and Redfield, which had been closed since August 2023 for trail improvements, opened with the five bridges widened and a new wider concrete surface.) Constructed during 2010–2013, the 33.1-mile (53.3 km) North Loop, which runs between Dawson and Waukee through Perry, Minburn, and Dallas Center, is the third concrete section.

Between Yale and Adel, the 31 miles (50 km) of trail is very scenic and mostly tree covered. The north loop between Herndon and Waukee, is wider, nearly flat, and is much more exposed to the sun and wind.

By 2007, the conservation board directors estimated that more than 125,000 people use this trail each year. In 2014, the Dallas County Conservation Department estimated over 330,000 trail users of the RRVT annually. In March 2024, the Dallas County Conservation Director Mike Wallace stated that 150,000 persons used the RRVT in 2023 which was the last year of the annual fee: 2024 is the first year of no daily or annual fee for trail users; however, special permits will be needed for event organizers for events held on the trail.

Since the late 2000s, Snyder & Associates has been the engineering firm which supports development and upkeep of the Raccoon River Valley Trail as well as the High Trestle Trail and the nine-mile connector between the two trails.

== Locations of trailheads ==
Original RRVT (Note: Formerly, Kennedy Station and Ortonville had parking for the trail. Kennedy Station is located along I Avenue in Dallas County 0.8 miles (1.3 km) north of Old Highway US 6 also known as CR F60. Ortonville is located at the intersection of Hickman Road ( US 6) and CR R16 (R Avenue in Dallas County))

- Waukee (41°36′44″N 93°47′46″W)
- Waukee - junction with North Loop (Note: The Waukee trailhead is near Sugar Creek Elementary at the northeast corner of the lighted intersection of Hickman Road ( US 6) and North 10th Street which is also known as CR R22 (U Avenue in Dallas County). In Waukee, 10th Street is the western terminus of Ashworth Drive.) (41°36′55″N 93°53′24″W)
- Adel
- CR P58 (K Avenue in Dallas County) and the Raccoon River Valley Trail
- Redfield
- Linden
- Panora
- Yale
- Herndon - junction with North Loop (41°50′46″N 94°20′59″W)
- Cooper
- Jefferson (42°00′58″N 94°22′05″W)

North Loop RRVT

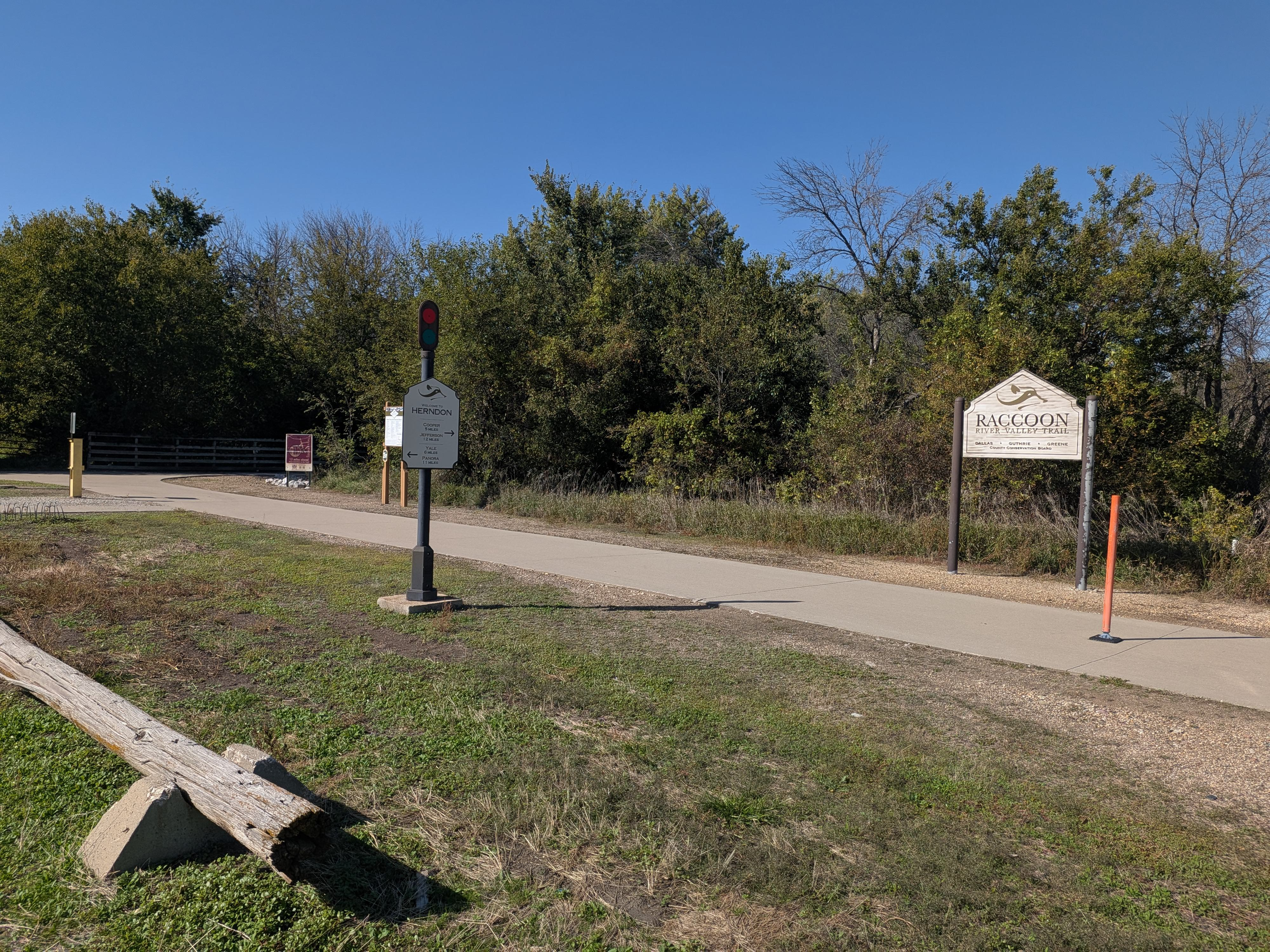
Raccoon River Valley Trail trailhead in Herndon

- Herndon - junction with Original Trail (41°50′46″N 94°20′59″W)
- Jamaica
- Dawson
- Perry
- Forest Park Museum (south of Iowa 141 on K Ave.)
- Minburn
- Dallas Center
- Waukee - junction with Original Trail (41°36′55″N 93°53′24″W)

== History ==
Original RRVT

The RRVT trail between Waukee and Yale runs along the rail line established in 1881 as a narrow-gauge line of the Des Moines Western Railroad, which became part of the Wabash Railroad, and later, the Milwaukee Road, who took over the line and converted it to standard gauge. Passenger service ended along the line in 1952. In 1982, the Chicago & North Western purchased the line. Freight service continued along the line until 1987. In 1987, the Central Iowa Energy Cooperative (CIECO), an affiliate of the Central Iowa Power Company, purchased the line and hundreds of acres of land located south of Panora, Iowa. CIECO intended to build a coal-fired power plant on the land it had acquired south of Panora, near the railroad line. However, plans for this power plant were abandoned. Much of the land that was to have been the site of the power plant was placed in the 1,236-acre (5.00 km^{2}) Lennon Mill Wildlife Area south of Panora. In late 1987, CIECO, Iowa Trails, and the Conservation Boards of Dallas and Guthrie Counties agreed to develop the railroad line as a recreational trail.

On October 7, 1989, the first section of the Raccoon River Valley Trail opened. In 1990, 34 miles (55 km) of this paved trail were opened between Waukee, and Yale. North of Yale, the RRVT lies along an old Union Pacific Railroad line which was abandoned in the late 1990s. In 1997, the trail was extended with a paved trail from Yale to Jefferson. In 1999, the trail was extended with a 5 miles (8.0 km) paved trail link from Waukee to the 11.3 miles (18.2 km) Clive Greenbelt Trail in Clive.

In 2024, the bridge over the North Raccoon River on the east side of Adel was resurfaced and widened from 10 feet to 12 feet which allows emergency vehicles and maintenance equipment better access to the trail. On May 12, 2025, the bridge over the North Raccoon River on the east side of Adel was set on fire which caused the 2025 Raccoon Ride route to be detoured onto Highway 6 eastward for 1.5 miles (2.4 km) from west of the North Raccoon River to Prospect Avenue where the Baccoon Ride route travels northward to the Raccoon River Valley Trail and the Baccoon Ride route resumes eastward on the Raccoon River Valley Trail. The bridge will remain closed until at least May 2026 with the estimated damage to the bridge is approximately $896,000 according to Dallas County Conservation.

On April 8, 2024, Waukee officials discussed a Hickman Road Pedestrian Crossing study which would involve constructing a tunnel for pedestrians and bicyclists under Hickman Road at 10th Street near the RRVT trailhead in Waukee and a bridge or overpass for pedestrians and bicyclists at Warrior Lane over Hickman Road.

North Loop

The 33.1-mile (53.3 km) North Loop is an additional paved branch from Herndon through Perry to Waukee. This paved branch follows the old Union Pacific Railroad line which was abandoned in late 2005. From Herndon, it travels through Jamaica and then northern Dallas County to Dawson, Perry, Minburn, Dallas Center, and then to Waukee. On May 14, 2011, the six mile (10 km) concrete segment from Dawson to Perry opened for use. A six-mile (10 km) concrete segment from Waukee to Dallas Center opened for use on October 15, 2011 On December 15, 2012, the section from Perry through Minburn to Dallas Center was completed.

The remaining sections of the North Loop were completed during early 2013 and opened for use on June 1, 2013.

In downtown Perry at noon on Saturday, June 1, 2013, the grand opening of the new 33 mile "north loop" occurred with Chuck Offenburger as Master of Ceremonies and a keynote speech by Kevin Cooney. (Note: In downtown Perry on Saturday, June 1, 2013, the grand opening of the new 33 mile "north loop" included food and beverage vendors; a bicycle poker run from 9:00 until 12:30 with cards at Waukee, Dallas Center, Minburn, Forest Park Museum, Perry, the bicycle bridge over the North Raccoon River west of Perry, Dawson, and Jamaica. See the "north loop" Grand Opening flyer for more.)

== Connections to other trails ==
=== Clive Greenbelt Trail ===
5 miles (8.0 km) east of Waukee in Polk County, the RRVT connects to the 11.3 miles (18.2 km) Clive Greenbelt Trail in Clive and forms part of the Central Iowa Trails network.

=== High Trestle Trail ===
On August 17, 2024, the 9-mile (14 km) connector between Perry and Woodward opened with a ribbon cutting at the trailhead in Bouton which is located at 110 East 1st Street. This paved concrete trail connects the town of Perry with the 25-mile (40 km) High Trestle Trail.

This connector between the Raccoon River Valley Trail and the High Trestle Trail forms two 100-mile (160 km) recreational trail loops near Des Moines with a continuous 120-mile (190 km) paved loop. The western loop involves the Raccoon River Valley Trail and the Clive Greenbelt Trail. The eastern loop includes the Heart of Iowa Nature Trail, the Chichaqua Valley Trail and the Gay Lea Wilson Trail. The High Trestle Trail connects at Slater to the 32-mile (51 km) Heart of Iowa Nature Trail in Story and Marshall counties. Using the Perry to Woodward connector, the High Trestle Trail, the 28.2-mile (45.4 km) Neal Smith Trail, which is also called the East River Trail, and the connector between Ankeny and the Neil Smith Trail, both Des Moines and Big Creek State Park are accessible along paved trails.

== Connections to state parks ==
The picturesque trail connects Big Creek State Park north of Polk City in Polk County, Ledges State Park south of Boone in Boone County, and Springbrook State Park west of Yale in Guthrie County. Camping is available at both Ledges State Park and Springbrook State Park.

== Future connection to Krushchev in Iowa Trail ==
A connection is planned at Herndon to the 22-mile (35 km) Krushchev in Iowa Trail in northern Guthrie County. This link will give Coon Rapids, Bayard, and Bagley a paved trail connected to the RRVT.

== Winter activities ==
Beginning in February, 2009, when at least 4 inches (10 cm) of snow covers the paved trail, the Raccoon Valley Snow Chasers (RVSC) groom the paved trail. The RRVT between Jefferson and Waukee along with the North Loop is part of a larger winter activities trail network of over 200 miles (320 km). During the winter, this groomed trail is ideal for both cross country skiers and snowmobilers.

=== Raccoon Valley Snow Chasers (RVSC) ===
Search social media pages for "Raccoon Valley Snow Chasers" to get current information for snowmachines on the Raccoon River Valley Trail. Created July 28, 2010, the RVSC social media page contains a timeline of past events.

Raccoon Valley Snow Chasers (RVSC):

- Monthly meetings, usually on the 2nd Thursday at the Lake Panorama Conference Center near Panora
- Summer campouts, often in July at Springbrook State Park near Yale
- Summer outings, often in August, at the main beach, also known as boulder beach, on the east side of Lake Panorama near Panora
- Fall grass drags, often on the 2nd or 3rd Sunday in November or the 1st Sunday in December, at the Flack river farm five miles west of Jefferson—just south of Highway 30 and just west of county road P14
- Winter ice drags, often the 2nd Sunday in February, at the main beach, also known as boulder beach, on the east side of Lake Panorama near Panora
- Winter rides, sometimes in other nearby states: near Cable, Wisconsin at Lake Namekagon during the 2nd week of February in 2014
- DNR-certified Iowa snowmobile safety classes for youths ages 11 to 18, often the 2nd Saturday in December, at the Lake Panorama Association (LPA) Conference Center near Panora

In 2011, RVSC received the ISSA "CLUB OF THE YEAR" award.

== See also ==
- List of rail trails
- Clive Greenbelt Trail
- High Trestle Trail
- Krushchev in Iowa Trail
