= Jordan Carstens =

American football player (born 1981)

No. 67
- Position: Defensive tackle

Personal information
- Born: January 22, 1981 (age 45); Carroll, Iowa, U.S.
- Listed height: 6 ft 5 in (1.96 m)
- Listed weight: 300 lb (136 kg)

Career information
- College: Iowa State
- NFL draft: 2004: undrafted

Career history
- Carolina Panthers (2004–2006)

Awards and highlights
- Second-team All-Big 12 (2002)

Career NFL statistics
- Tackles: 51
- Sacks: 4
- Forced fumbles: 1
- Stats at Pro Football Reference

Jordan Lee Carstens (born January 22, 1981) is an American former professional football player who was a defensive tackle for the Carolina Panthers of the National Football League (NFL). He was an undrafted free agent after playing college football for the Iowa State Cyclones.. Jordan, a native of Bagley, Iowa, farms and enjoys hunting during his time away from the NFL.

== Early life ==
Carstens attended Panorama High School in Panora, Iowa. He was a two-year letterman in football and earned third-team All-State honors from the Des Moines Register as a senior.

== College career ==
In 1999, Jordan walked-on at the 105th spot, which was the last spot for the two-a-days roster, on the Iowa State Cyclones football team, was red-shirted, and became the defensive scout team's player of the year.

In 2000 as a freshman defensiveman, Jordan earned academic first-team All Big 12 Conference honors.

In 2001 as a sophomore defensive tackle with 71 tackles (40 solo), he was selected to the third-team Big 12 Conference team, was an academic first-team All Big 12 Conference, was a CoSIDA/GTE District VII first-team Academic All-American, and was a second-team Verizon Academic All-American with a GPA of 3.52.

In 2002 as a junior defensive tackle with 97 tackles (a team high 13 for loss) and 6 sacks, he was co-captain of the ISU football team, earned a spot on the second-team All Big 12 Conference squad and the academic first-team All Big 12 Conference squad, was a CoSIDA/GTE District VII first-team Academic All-American, and was a first-team Verizon Academic All-American.

In 2003 as a senior defensive tackle, he was co-captain of the ISU football team and was a CoSIDA/GTE District VII first-team Academic All-American, a first-team Verizon Academic All-American, a first-team All-Big 12 Conference defensive lineman, and an academic first-team All Big 12 Conference scholar.

Jordan earned a degree from Iowa State University majoring in Agricultural Business and finished his collegiate football career with 306 tackles (23 for loss) and 10 sacks.

== Professional career ==
Over the 2004–2006 seasons as a defensive lineman with the Carolina Panthers, Jordan played in 29 games and had 50 tackles (35 solo), 4 sacks, and 2 forced fumbles.

Carstens would eventually have to retire as a player due to kidney-related health problems. He often returns to Panora, Iowa, where he attended high school, to give speeches to the Panorama Panthers football team.
