= High Trestle Trail =

Rail trail in central Iowa

Coordinates: 41.867251°N 93.868050°W

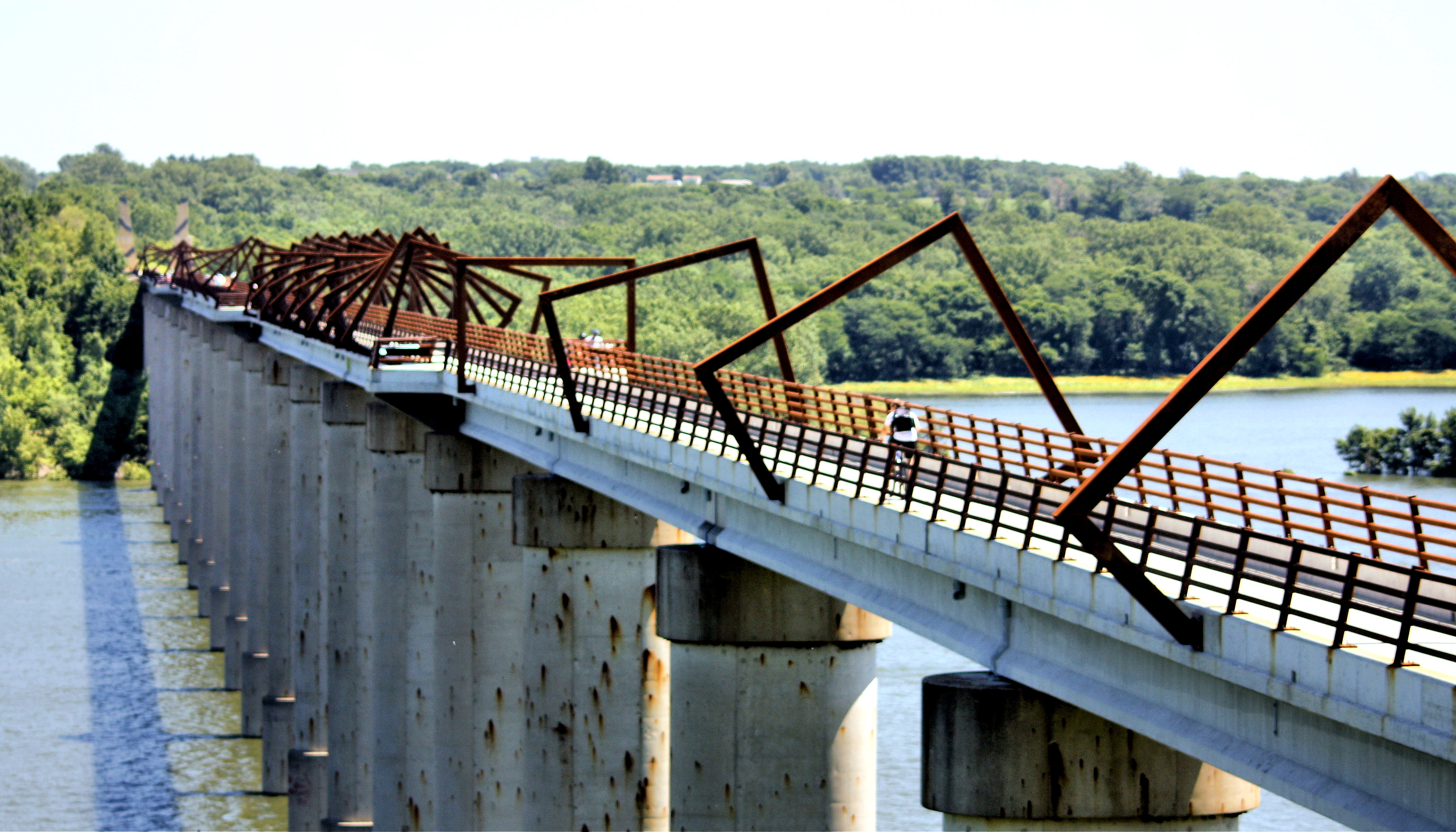
- High Trestle Trail Bridge
- Length: 25 mi (40 km)
- Location: Central Iowa, United States
- Trailheads: Ankeny; Sheldahl; Slater; Madrid; Woodward
- Use: Hiking, biking, equestrian (between Slater and the Des Moines River, and the Des Moines River to Woodward, but not on the bridge itself)
- Surface: Asphalt / concrete
- Right of way: Local governments and/or groups, on land formerly owned by Union Pacific Railroad
Trail map

High Trestle Trail is a rail trail running from Ankeny to Woodward in central Iowa. The recreation trail opened on April 30, 2011. It is a paved recreational trail that runs through the Polk, Story, Boone, and Dallas counties. The trail's name is derived from a former 1913 bridge that spanned the Des Moines River between the towns of Madrid and Woodward.

Conservation board directors and the Iowa Natural Heritage Foundation estimate that more than 3,000 people use this trail each week. The trail is a major component of a planned pair of 100-mile (160 km) loops that will meet near Des Moines.

== Development ==
The High Trestle Trail follows the route of a former Union Pacific Railroad (UPRR) freight line between Woodward and Ankeny, Iowa. UPRR first proposed retiring the line in 2003. The lowa Natural Heritage Foundation (INHF), which had organized other rail-trail projects in Iowa, bought the 439 acres (178 ha) corridor from UPRR in 2005. As part of the transaction, UPRR donated over $3 million of land value. INHF then transferred sections of the land to partner agencies in the five cities and four counties within the corridor.

Construction on the trail, designed by engineering firm Snyder and Associates, Inc. began in early 2006 to include 1,010 feet (310 m) of trail in Woodward. In 2007, bookend projects in Woodward and Ankeny were constructed. The catalyst for construction came from a $5.6 million Congressional appropriation in 2005. With the help of additional state and federal grants, 20 additional miles of trail were completed and opened to the public in 2008.

The last portion to be completed was the high bridge over the Des Moines River. A $1.75 million grant from Vision Iowa, a project of the Iowa Economic Development Authority, helped fund the construction of a new bridge superstructure designed by Shuck-Britson, Inc., and artwork by RDG Dahlquist Art Studio. The project was officially completed with the grand opening of the bridge in April 2011. Following its completion, the trail was awarded a Mid American Energy Trails and Greenways project award that October.

== Trestle bridge ==
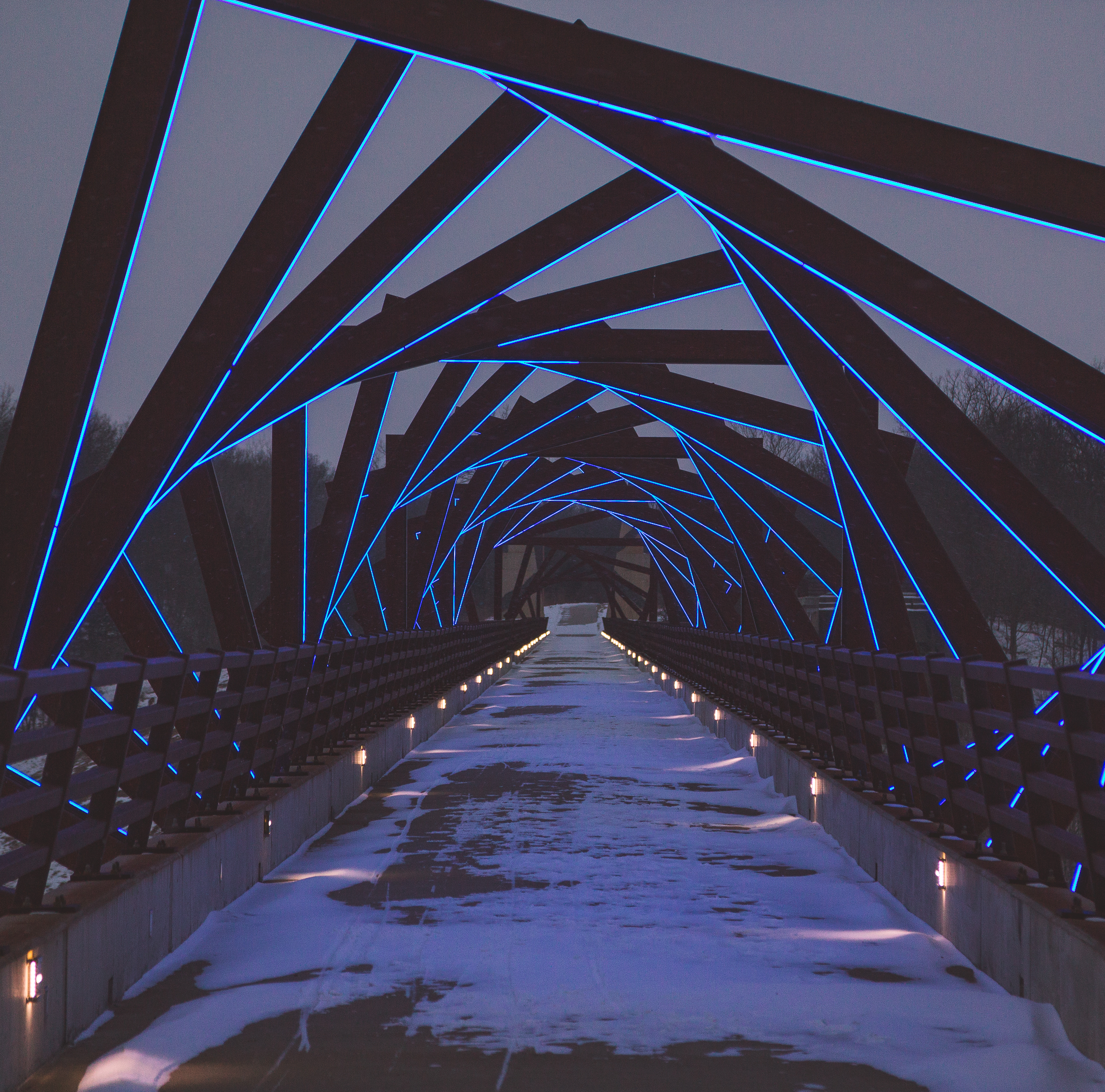
High Trestle Bridge at night

The 13-story-high (40-meter) and nearly half-mile-long (770-meter) trestle bridge provides scenic views of the Des Moines River Valley and is located near mining shafts that were worked by Italian immigrant families and others who settled nearby. The bridge decking incorporates a decorative structure that represents the view through a mine shaft, and its design includes decorative lighting that remains on from dusk until midnight in the summer and until 9:00 pm in the winter.

The bridge was originally built in the 1970s to carry rail traffic on a Milwaukee Road line. With the retirement of that rail line in the early 2000s, the original bridge deck was removed, and its steel I-beams were reused for a new Union Pacific bridge in Boone. However, the piers (or trestles) remained in place, and the original piers now support a new deck designed for pedestrian and bicycle traffic. Between the removal of the original decking and the construction of its replacement, the single-file line of unconnected concrete piers was informally known as "Iowa's Stonehenge".

On April 2, 2015, the BBC showcased the High Trestle Trail Bridge as part of a globe-spanning collection of eight eye-catching footbridges.

== Trailheads ==
These are the trailheads:

- Ankeny
- Sheldahl
- Slater
- Madrid
- Woodward

== Connections to other recreational trails ==
On August 17, 2024, the 9-mile (14 km) connector between Perry and Woodward opened with a ribbon cutting at the trailhead in Bouton which is located at 110 East 1st Street. This paved concrete trail connects the Raccoon River Valley Trail with the High Trestle Trail.

The High Trestle Trail lies between two 100-mile (160 km) recreational trail loops near Des Moines which form a continuous 120-mile (190 km) paved loop. The western loop involves the Raccoon River Valley Trail and the Clive Greenbelt Trail. The eastern loop includes the High Trestle Trail, the Heart of Iowa Nature Trail, the Chichaqua Valley Trail and the Gay Lea Wilson Trail. The High Trestle Trail connects at Slater to the 32-mile (51 km) Heart of Iowa Nature Trail in Story and Marshall counties. With the High Trestle Trail, the 26-mile (42 km) Neal Smith Trail, which generally follows the east bank of the Des Moines River and often is called the East River Trail, and the connector between those two trails which is called the Ankeny connector, both Des Moines and Big Creek State Park are accessible along paved trails.

As of May 2021, a spur trail is planned to connect the High Trestle Trail from Woodward through Granger to the 1,834-acre (742 ha) Jester Park located along the western shore of the 5,950-acre (2,408 ha) Saylorville Lake. The 17-mile (27 km) long Saylorville Lake is located 11 miles (18 km) upstream of Des Moines and has the 28.2-mile (45.4 km) Neil Smith Trail, a paved recreational trail, located near its eastern shore. South of the Saylorville Dam is a trail, which is known as "the connector", that connects the Neil Smith Trail and the Ankeny trails system. The Neil Smith and John Pat Dorrian Trails connect southward along the east side of the Des Moines River from the Big Creek Lake marina, through Polk City, Saylorville Lake, the Birdland Marina, and the Des Moines Botanical Center to the 167-acre (68 ha) Gray's Lake Park located just south of downtown Des Moines in the greater Des Moines trails system. When the Des Moines River is 13 feet (4.0 m) above flood stage between the Saylorville Dam and Des Moines, portions of the Neil Smith trail may be underwater.

== See also ==
- List of rail trails
- Raccoon River Valley Trail
