= Dallas Center, Iowa =

- City
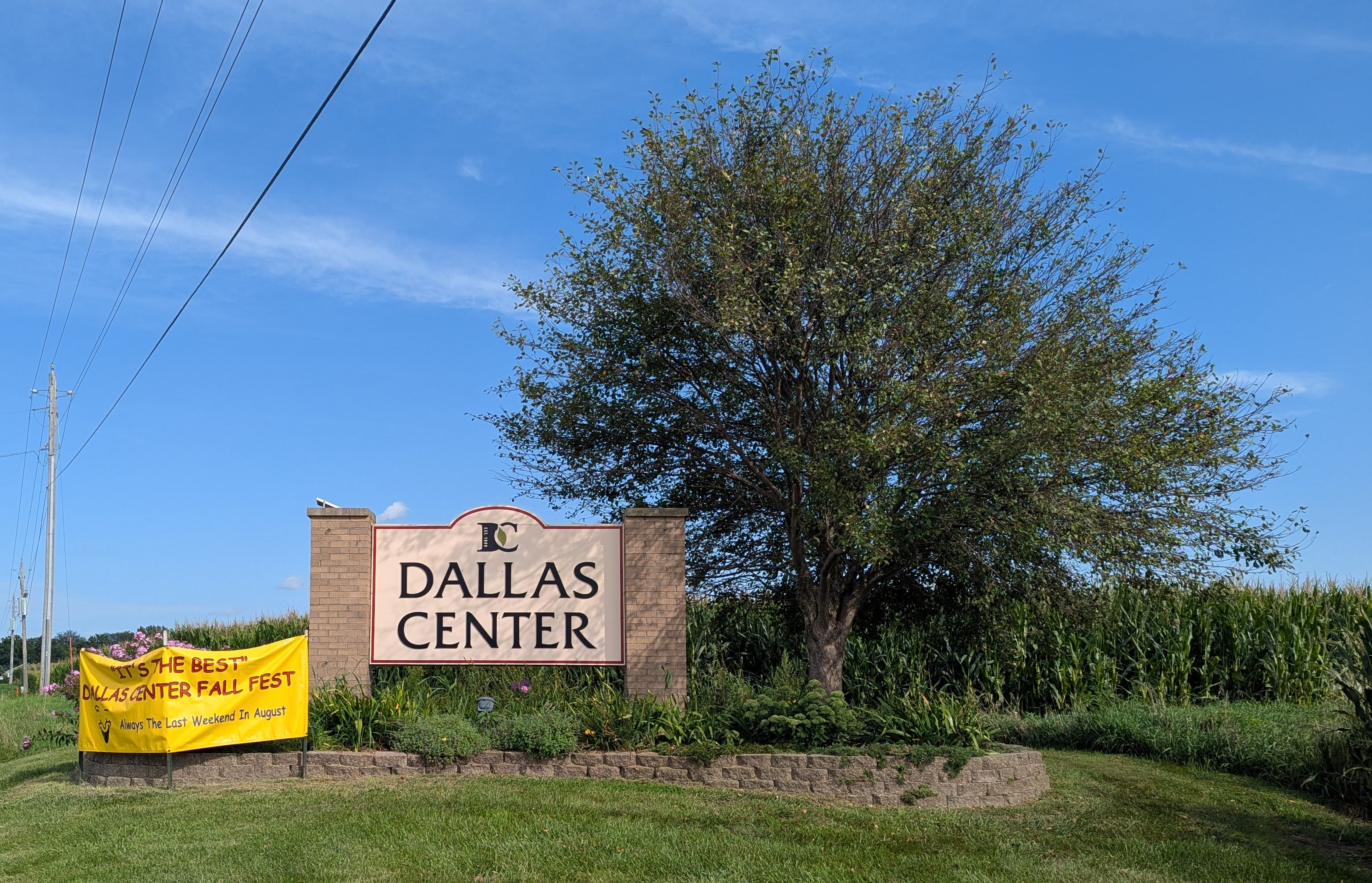
- Welcome sign
- Motto: "Quietly Progressive"
- Location of Dallas Center, Iowa
- Coordinates: 41°41′14″N 94°00′20″W
- Country: United States
- State: Iowa
- County: Dallas

Area
  - Total: 5.27 sq mi (13.66 km^{2})
  - Land: 5.27 sq mi (13.66 km^{2})
  - Water: 0 sq mi (0.00 km^{2})
- Elevation: 1,050 ft (320 m)

Population (2020)
  - Total: 1,901
  - Density: 360.4/sq mi (139.15/km^{2})
- Time zone: UTC-6 (Central (CST))
  - Summer (DST): UTC-5 (CDT)
- ZIP code: 50063
- Area code: 515
- FIPS code: 19-18255
- GNIS feature ID: 2393707
- Website: Official website

Dallas Center is a city in Dallas County, Iowa, United States. The population was 1,901 during the 2020 census. It is part of the Des Moines–West Des Moines Metropolitan Statistical Area.

== History ==
Dallas Center got its start in the year 1869, following construction of the railroad through the territory. It was named for United States Vice President George M. Dallas.

Dallas Center was incorporated on March 22, 1880.

== Geography ==
According to the United States Census Bureau, the city has a total area of 4.58 square miles (11.86 km^{2}), all land.

Dallas Center is located 20 miles (32 km) west-northwest of Des Moines and nine miles (14 km) west of Grimes.

== Demographics ==
Historical populations
| Year | Pop. | ±% |
|---|---|---|
| 1870 | 133 | — |
| 1880 | 450 | +238.3% |
| 1890 | 445 | −1.1% |
| 1900 | 625 | +40.4% |
| 1910 | 769 | +23.0% |
| 1920 | 864 | +12.4% |
| 1930 | 852 | −1.4% |
| 1940 | 865 | +1.5% |
| 1950 | 944 | +9.1% |
| 1960 | 1,083 | +14.7% |
| 1970 | 1,128 | +4.2% |
| 1980 | 1,360 | +20.6% |
| 1990 | 1,454 | +6.9% |
| 2000 | 1,595 | +9.7% |
| 2010 | 1,623 | +1.8% |
| 2020 | 1,901 | +17.1% |
Source:"U.S. Census website". United States Census Bureau. and Iowa Data Center; Source: U.S. Decennial Census

=== 2020 census ===
As of the 2020 census, Dallas Center had a population of 1,901. The median age was 39.4 years. 25.7% of residents were under the age of 18, 3.7% were between the ages of 20 and 24, 26.1% were from 25 to 44, 22.9% were from 45 to 64, and 19.9% were 65 years of age or older. For every 100 females there were 95.6 males, and for every 100 females age 18 and over there were 94.0 males age 18 and over. The gender makeup of the city was 48.9% male and 51.1% female. 0.0% of residents lived in urban areas, while 100.0% lived in rural areas. The population density was 360.7 inhabitants per square mile (139.3/km^{2}).

There were 721 households, of which 34.7% had children under the age of 18 living in them. Of all households, 56.2% were married-couple households, 6.9% were cohabitating couples, 16.0% were households with a male householder and no spouse or partner present, and 20.9% were households with a female householder and no spouse or partner present. 31.8% of all households were non-families; 26.8% were made up of individuals, and 14.0% had someone living alone who was 65 years of age or older.

There were 755 housing units at an average density of 143.3 per square mile (55.3/km^{2}), of which 4.5% were vacant. The homeowner vacancy rate was 1.7% and the rental vacancy rate was 6.0%.

Racial composition as of the 2020 census
| Race | Number | Percent |
|---|---|---|
| White | 1,804 | 94.9% |
| Black or African American | 9 | 0.5% |
| American Indian and Alaska Native | 3 | 0.2% |
| Asian | 8 | 0.4% |
| Native Hawaiian and Other Pacific Islander | 0 | 0.0% |
| Some other race | 11 | 0.6% |
| Two or more races | 66 | 3.5% |
| Hispanic or Latino (of any race) | 38 | 2.0% |

=== 2010 census ===
As of the census of 2010, there were 1,623 people, 630 households, and 434 families residing in the city. The population density was 354.4 inhabitants per square mile (136.8/km^{2}). There were 669 housing units at an average density of 146.1 per square mile (56.4/km^{2}). The racial makeup of the city was 98.2% White, 0.6% African American, 0.2% Native American, 0.1% Asian, 0.1% from other races, and 0.8% from two or more races. Hispanic or Latino of any race were 0.7% of the population.

There were 630 households, of which 33.3% had children under the age of 18 living with them, 56.8% were married couples living together, 8.1% had a female householder with no husband present, 4.0% had a male householder with no wife present, and 31.1% were non-families. 27.3% of all households were made up of individuals, and 12.5% had someone living alone who was 65 years of age or older. The average household size was 2.48 and the average family size was 3.03.

The median age in the city was 40.1 years. 26.5% of residents were under the age of 18; 5.2% were between the ages of 18 and 24; 23.8% were from 25 to 44; 26.9% were from 45 to 64; and 17.7% were 65 years of age or older. The gender makeup of the city was 48.1% male and 51.9% female.

=== 2000 census ===
As of the census of 2000, there were 1,595 people, 591 households, and 433 families residing in the city. The population density was 361.0 inhabitants per square mile (139.4/km^{2}). There were 616 housing units at an average density of 139.4 per square mile (53.8/km^{2}). The racial makeup of the city was 98.50% White, 0.31% African American, 0.25% Native American, 0.06% Asian, 0.69% from other races, and 0.19% from two or more races. Hispanic or Latino of any race were 0.63% of the population.

There were 591 households, out of which 37.2% had children under the age of 18 living with them, 64.8% were married couples living together, 6.8% had a female householder with no husband present, and 26.6% were non-families. 24.0% of all households were made up of individuals, and 11.0% had someone living alone who was 65 years of age or older. The average household size was 2.58 and the average family size was 3.07.

In the city, the population was spread out, with 26.1% under the age of 18, 6.4% from 18 to 24, 28.9% from 25 to 44, 20.8% from 45 to 64, and 17.7% who were 65 years of age or older. The median age was 39 years. For every 100 females, there were 94.3 males. For every 100 females age 18 and over, there were 89.1 males.

The median income for a household in the city was $52,883, and the median income for a family was $56,250. Males had a median income of $34,583 versus $26,055 for females. The per capita income for the city was $20,038. About 2.9% of families and 4.2% of the population were below the poverty line, including 3.6% of those under age 18 and 8.6% of those age 65 or over.

== Parks and recreation ==
The city has two large parks located at each end of the city. Mound park, located on the west, includes sand volleyball courts, a gazebo, shelters, tennis court, playground equipment, and a rollerskating rink which is operational during the summer months. Memorial Park, on the east, contains playground equipment, much open space for flying kites, letting dogs run, a nine-hole disc golf course, and a basketball area.

In 2009, the 33.1-mile (53.3 km) paved north loop of the Raccoon River Valley Trail (RRVT) added Dallas Center, Minburn, Perry, Dawson and Jamaica as new trailheads. The original Raccoon River Valley Trail, now known as the south loop, is a 56-mile (90 km) paved multi-use recreational trail which reaches from the Clive Greenbelt Trail to Jefferson, and passes through Clive, Urbandale, Waukee, Adel, Redfield, Linden, Panora, Yale, Herndon, and Cooper. The RRVT is nearly 90 miles (140 km) of paved trails with a paved interior loop of more than 72 miles (116 km). The shaded trailhead in Dallas Center is at 14th and Walnut and has seasonal restroom facilities, a water fountain, bicycle racks, several benches, and a picnic table.

== Government ==
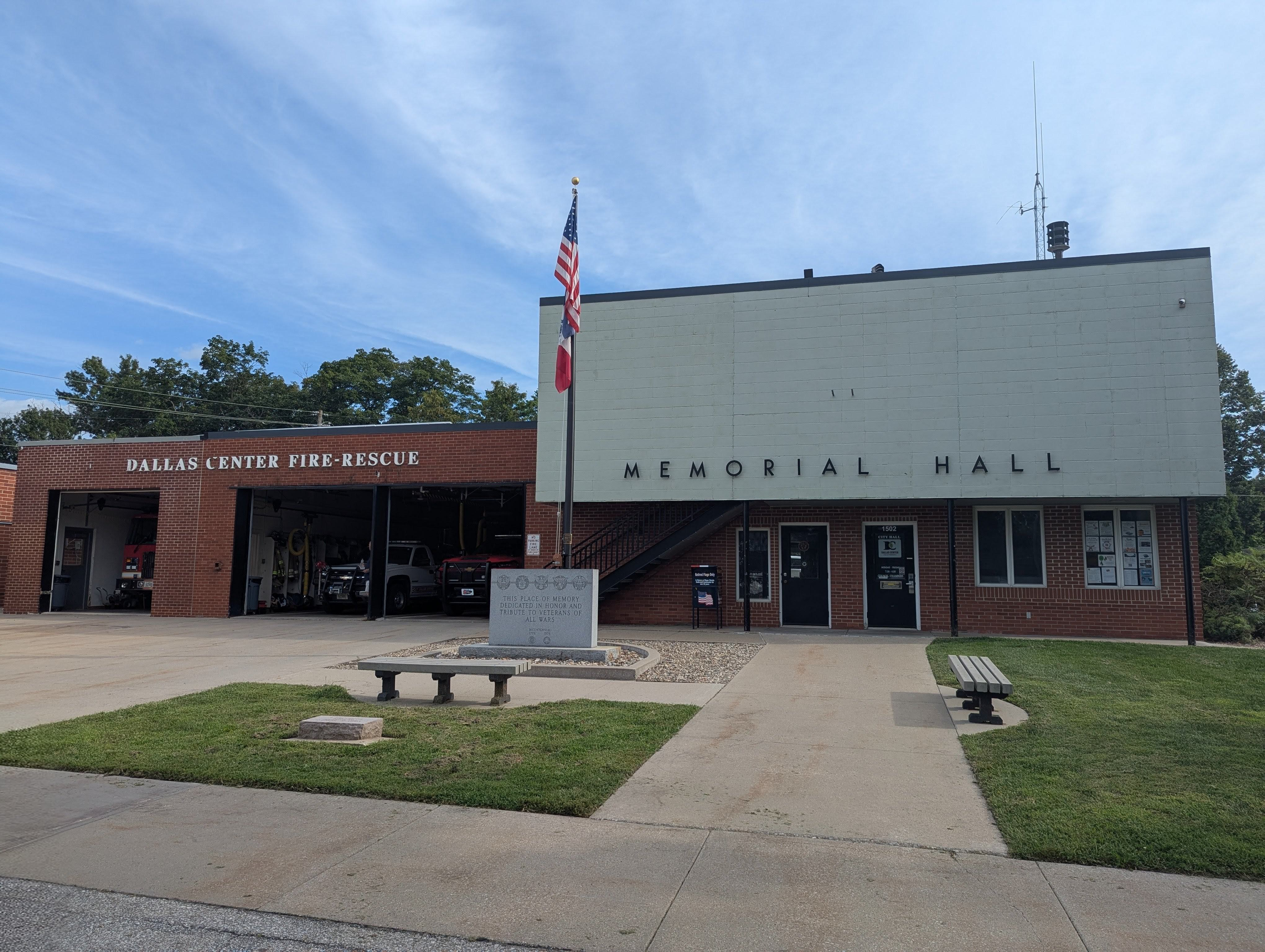
Dallas Center city hall and fire-rescue building

As of 2024 the mayor is Danny Beyer and members of the city council are Daniel Wilrich, Amy Strutt, Angie Beaudet, Beth Wright, and Bret Van De Pol.

== Education ==
The city of Dallas Center is joined with the city of Grimes to make the school district of Dallas Center–Grimes Community School District. The district consists of a middle school (5-6 grades), Dallas Center Elementary School (K-4) in Dallas Center, and the South Prairie Elementary (K–4), North Ridge Elementary (K-4), Oak View Middle School (grades 7–8), Heritage Elementary (K-4), and Dallas Center-Grimes High School + Central Office which are all in Grimes. The school mascot is the Mustangs and their colors are red and white.

== See also ==
- Raccoon River Valley Trail
