= Panora, Iowa =

- City
- Location of Panora, Iowa
- Coordinates: 41°41′17″N 94°22′25″W
- Country: USA
- State: Iowa
- County: Guthrie

Area
  - Total: 1.81 sq mi (4.69 km^{2})
  - Land: 1.81 sq mi (4.69 km^{2})
  - Water: 0 sq mi (0.00 km^{2})
- Elevation: 1,070 ft (330 m)

Population (2020)
  - Total: 1,091
  - Density: 602.4/sq mi (232.59/km^{2})
- Time zone: UTC-6 (Central (CST))
  - Summer (DST): UTC-5 (CDT)
- ZIP code: 50216
- Area code: 641
- FIPS code: 19-61320
- GNIS feature ID: 2396137
- Website: www.cityofpanora.com

Panora is a city in Guthrie County, Iowa, United States. The population was 1,091 at the time of the 2020 census. It is part of the Des Moines metropolitan area.

== History ==
Panora was platted in 1851. Panora is the oldest community in Guthrie County and was its county seat until 1876 when Guthrie Center became the county seat.

== Geography ==
Panora is located along the Middle Raccoon River.

According to the United States Census Bureau, the city has a total area of 1.80 square miles (4.66 km^{2}), all land.

== Demographics ==
Historical populations
Year	Pop.	±%
1860	314	—
1870	504	+60.5%
1880	795	+57.7%
1890	809	+1.8%
1900	958	+18.4%
1910	1,080	+12.7%
1920	966	−10.6%
1930	1,014	+5.0%
1940	1,169	+15.3%
1950	1,062	−9.2%
1960	1,019	−4.0%
1970	982	−3.6%
1980	1,211	+23.3%
1990	1,100	−9.2%
2000	1,175	+6.8%
2010	1,124	−4.3%
2020	1,091	−2.9%
Source:"U.S. Census website". United States Census Bureau. and Iowa Data Center; Source: U.S. Decennial Census

=== 2020 census ===
As of the 2020 census, there were 1,091 people, 449 households, and 296 families residing in the city. The population density was 602.4 inhabitants per square mile (232.6/km^{2}). There were 495 housing units at an average density of 273.3 per square mile (105.5/km^{2}).

The median age in the city was 42.4 years. 26.2% of residents were under the age of 18. 27.9% of residents were under the age of 20; 3.8% were between the ages of 20 and 24; 21.0% were from 25 to 44; 24.9% were from 45 to 64; and 22.5% were 65 years of age or older. The gender makeup of the city was 46.5% male and 53.5% female. For every 100 females there were 86.8 males, and for every 100 females age 18 and over there were 85.5 males age 18 and over.

Of all households, 30.1% had children under the age of 18 living with them, 50.3% were married-couple households, 5.1% were cohabiting couple households, 27.8% had a female householder with no spouse or partner present, and 16.7% had a male householder with no spouse or partner present. About 34.1% of all households were non-families. 31.2% of all households were made up of individuals, and 14.9% had someone living alone who was 65 years old or older.

Of all housing units, 9.3% were vacant. The homeowner vacancy rate was 1.5% and the rental vacancy rate was 4.1%. 0.0% of residents lived in urban areas, while 100.0% lived in rural areas.

Racial composition as of the 2020 census
Race	Number	Percent
White	1,039	95.2%
Black or African American	6	0.5%
American Indian and Alaska Native	0	0.0%
Asian	1	0.1%
Native Hawaiian and Other Pacific Islander	0	0.0%
Some other race	19	1.7%
Two or more races	26	2.4%
Hispanic or Latino (of any race)	32	2.9%

=== 2010 census ===
As of the census of 2010, there were 1,124 people, 460 households, and 286 families residing in the city. The population density was 624.4 inhabitants per square mile (241.1/km^{2}). There were 522 housing units at an average density of 290.0 per square mile (112.0/km^{2}). The racial makeup of the city was 98.5% White, 0.2% African American, 0.4% Asian, 0.1% from other races, and 0.9% from two or more races. Hispanic or Latino of any race were 1.4% of the population.

There were 460 households, of which 32.2% had children under the age of 18 living with them, 49.3% were married couples living together, 10.0% had a female householder with no husband present, 2.8% had a male householder with no wife present, and 37.8% were non-families. 34.1% of all households were made up of individuals, and 18.1% had someone living alone who was 65 years of age or older. The average household size was 2.31 and the average family size was 2.96.

The median age in the city was 43.2 years. 26.1% of residents were under the age of 18; 4.3% were between the ages of 18 and 24; 22% were from 25 to 44; 25.5% were from 45 to 64; and 22.2% were 65 years of age or older. The gender makeup of the city was 44.8% male and 55.2% female.

=== 2000 census ===
As of the census of 2000, there were 1,175 people, 470 households, and 287 families residing in the city. The population density was 652.1 inhabitants per square mile (251.8/km^{2}). There were 504 housing units at an average density of 279.7 per square mile (108.0/km^{2}). The racial makeup of the city was 97.87% White, 0.43% African American, 0.09% Native American, 0.43% Pacific Islander, and 1.19% from two or more races. Hispanic or Latino of any race were 0.77% of the population.

There were 470 households, out of which 29.4% had children under the age of 18 living with them, 49.1% were married couples living together, 8.5% had a female householder with no husband present, and 38.9% were non-families. 33.8% of all households were made up of individuals, and 19.1% had someone living alone who was 65 years of age or older. The average household size was 2.32 and the average family size was 2.97.

Age spread: 24.5% under the age of 18, 7.4% from 18 to 24, 24.5% from 25 to 44, 19.7% from 45 to 64, and 23.9% who were 65 years of age or older. The median age was 40 years. For every 100 females, there were 92.6 males. For every 100 females age 18 and over, there were 86.7 males.

The median income for a household in the city was $35,000, and the median income for a family was $41,583. Males had a median income of $28,558 versus $22,692 for females. The per capita income for the city was $15,510. About 4.8% of families and 10.0% of the population were below the poverty line, including 7.6% of those under age 18 and 14.9% of those age 65 or over.

== Economy ==
Nutriom operates a facility in Panora which converts the equivalent of approximately 24 million eggs each year into a powder which can later be combined with water and heated to create scrambled eggs.

== Arts and culture ==
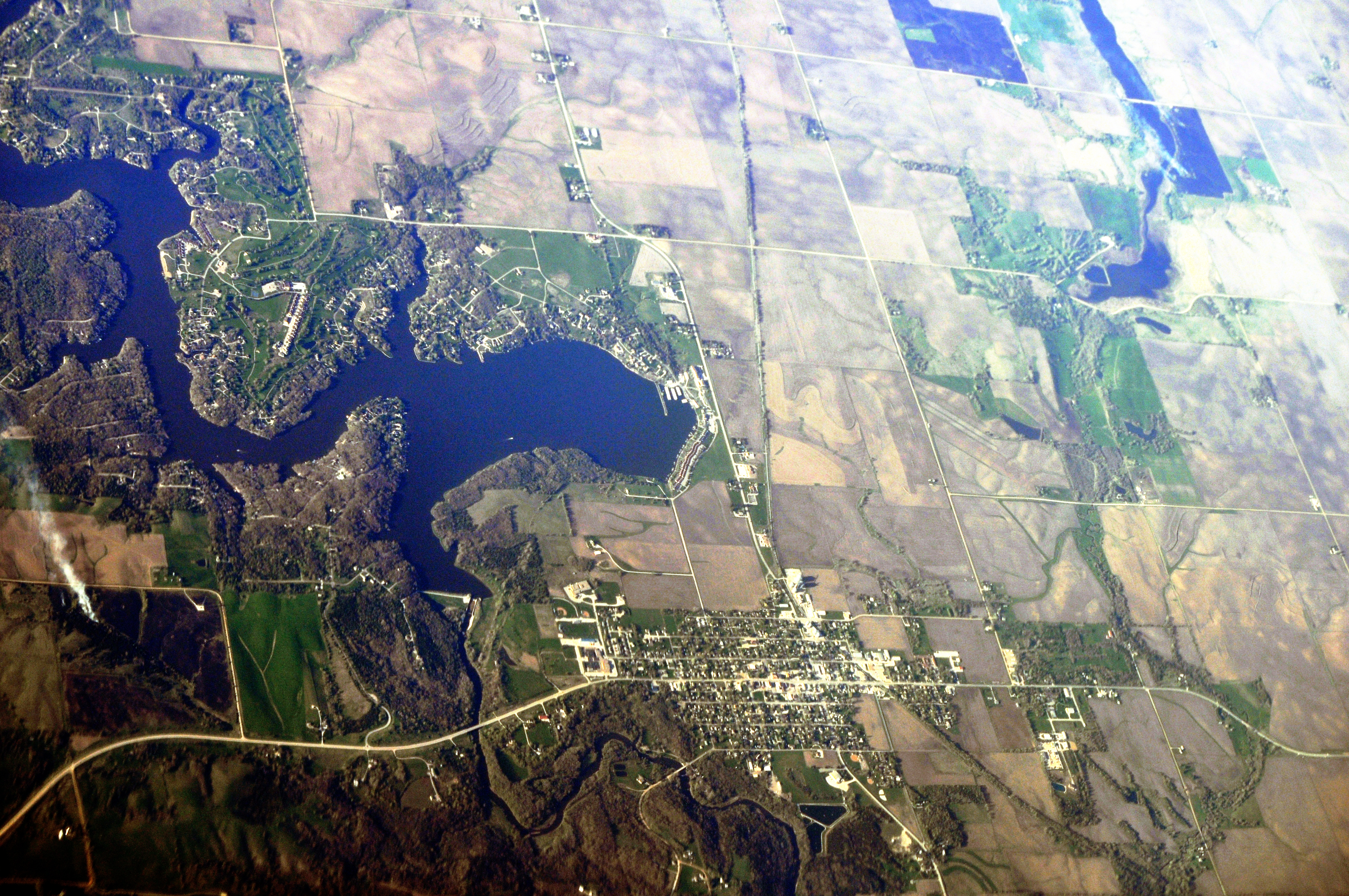
Aerial view of Panora and part of Lake Panorama

The Guthrie County Historical Village and Museum is a 4.5-acre (1.8 ha) museum in Panora, which includes historic buildings, implements, and rail cars.

Art in the Village Square occurs in Panora's Town Square Park in June, and includes live music and artwork.

Lake Panorama Days occurs each August, and includes a parade, street dance, and water skiing show at Lake Panorama.

== Parks and recreation ==
Lenon Mill Park campgrounds, located on the Middle Raccoon River, is part of the larger 1,236-acre (5.00 km^{2}) Lenon Mill Park and Wildlife Area.

The trailhead for the Raccoon River Valley Trail is located at in Panora.

Veterans Auditorium was built during the 1930s, and was dedicated by WHO radio sports announcer Ronald Reagan. Veterans Auditorium is the only extant structure of the original Panora-Linden High School building, which was removed from the National Listing of Historic Places upon its destruction in 1991. The Panora Community Center is attached to Veterans Auditorium.

== Government ==
In August 2023, councilmember Curtis Thornberry became interim mayor.

== Education ==
Panorama Community School District provides co-ed classes for grades K–12 to the towns of Panora, Linden, Yale, Jamaica, Bagley, and Lake Panorama. Schools located in Panora include Panorama Elementary School, which serves grades K–5, and Panorama Middle School/High School, which opened in 1974, and serves grades 6–12.

== Notable people ==
- William L. Carberry, college football player and coach.
- Aubrey W. Dirlam, served as Speaker, Majority Leader, and Minority Leader in the Minnesota House of Representatives.
- Kip Janvrin, American decathlete, who set the World Masters Athletics (M40) decathlon world record in 2005.
- Ralph Nichols, American college football coach and politician.

== See also ==
- Raccoon River Valley Trail
- Lemonade Ride
