= Cooper, Iowa =

- Unincorporated community
- Location within Iowa Location within the United States
- Coordinates: 41°55′N 94°21′W
- Country: United States
- State: Iowa
- County: Greene
- ZIP code: 50059
- Area code: 515

Cooper is an unincorporated community in Greene County, Iowa, United States.

== History ==
Cooper was founded in 1881 with the arrival of the railroad, and was named after Des Moines railroad executive F.M. Hubbell's father-in-law, Isaac Cooper. Cooper's population reached a high point of about 250 in 1900.

A fire in 1921 leveled much of Cooper's business district.

The population was 157 in 1940.

The Cooper School District was merged with nearby Jefferson in 1959; the Franklin Township School closed that summer and the junior high school building closed in the 1970s.

In late July, 1980, the Des Moines Register's Annual Great Bicycle Ride Across Iowa (RAGBRAI) brought 5,000 cyclists pedaling through town. As the cyclists approached from the west, a cannon was fired and a recording of the 1812 Overture was repeatedly played.

== Arts and culture ==
In 1981 an international search to adopt the 51st citizen of this small town landed residents on The Tonight Show Starring Johnny Carson. The publicity which followed generated a crowd of nearly 12,500 for the weekend event.

== See also ==
- Raccoon River Valley Trail
