= Iowa Employer Benefits Study =

The Iowa Employer Benefits Study is an annual survey of Iowa employers conducted to determine the types and amounts of employee benefits offered by organizations in Iowa. The information collected in this research allows employers to understand the value of their benefit plans compared to state and industry averages. Iowa benefits can also be compared to those offered nationally. The Iowa Employer Benefits Study is recognized to be a trustworthy and credible resource on employee benefits offered in this state.

== History ==
Prior to 1999, Iowa did not have ongoing employee benefits information that would allow employers to compare their benefit offering with other similar employers. A study was therefore developed by David P. Lind & Associates, L.C. (now d.b.a. David P. Lind Benchmark) of Clive, Iowa with survey assistance from Data Point Research, Inc., an Iowa-based social policy research firm. David P. Lind Benchmark conducts the Iowa Employer Benefits Study in order to help employers make educated and informed decisions based on relevant and credible data. In 2001, the concept of the Consumer Driven Health Plan (CDHP) was introduced to the study, asking how likely employers were to offer a CDHP in the future. Subsequent study years asked more in-depth questions about the details of CDHPs offered in addition to the likelihood of offering in the future. In 2005, Rural-Urban Continuum Codes were added to the collected data to outline differences in benefit offering by rural and urban organizations. In response to the Patient Protection and Affordable Care Act, the Iowa Employer Benefits Study included the first module on employer views of Health Care Reform in 2010.

== Methods ==
The method used is a stratified random sample of organizations and statistically sound survey methodology and weighting; the study does not use “samples of convenience”.

== Use Within the Community ==
Throughout the Iowa Employer Benefits Study's 18-year history, many public and private organizations have used its findings and consulted David P. Lind Benchmark about employer benefits and the healthcare field.

Data collected in the study were cited in the Real Iowans Research Initiative report released in 2010, which was a collaboration of the University of Iowa College of Public Health, University of Iowa Healthier Workforce Center for Excellence, State Public Policy Group, David P. Lind & Associates, and Data Point Research.

Findings from the study were included in a 2012 State of Iowa report about its current health care coverage. This report outlined the status of health coverage in consideration of an insurance exchange being created in compliance with Health Care Reform.

The study's Health and Wellness Initiative module was underwritten by the University of Iowa’s Healthier Workforce Center for Excellence in 2013. This same year, David P. Lind Benchmark released 'Our Health Care River,' an infographic illustrating the complexity of the health care system in Iowa and the United States. This infographic has been used in presentations offered by Wellmark Blue Cross Blue Shield and the Iowa Insurance Commissioner.

A new way to gauge overall employer satisfaction with local hospital and doctor services was integrated into the 2013 study. Assigning a separate grade to 12 measures, employers gave "local hospital care" two Ds, eight Cs, two Bs and no As, while "doctors' services" received one D, eight Cs, three Bs and no As.

The 2014 American College of Occupational and Environment Medicine survey, Employment Status Matters: A Statewide Survey of Quality-of-Life, Prevention Behaviors, and Absenteeism and Presenteeism, included findings from the 2010 and 2012 studies.

Contrary to what many critics of the 2010 Affordable Care Act anticipated, the most recent study found that employers have not dropped insurance coverage for their employees. The percentage of employers offering coverage increased four percentage points between 2013 and 2014, from 77 to 81 percent. The study also found that premium rate increases have slowed over the past few years.
