= Herndon, Iowa =

- Unincorporated community
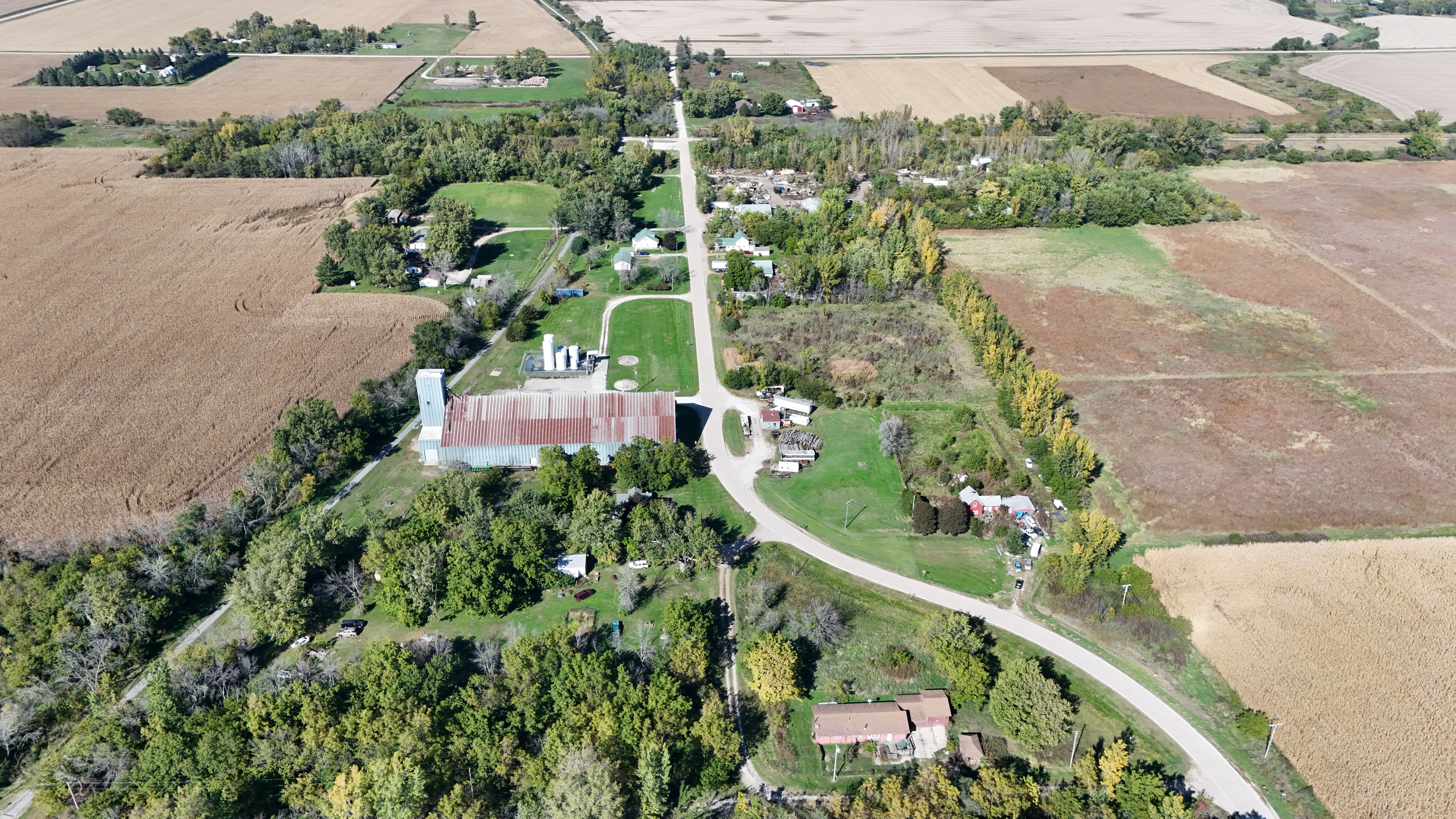
- Looking north along Herndon Road as it passes through Herndon

- Location within Iowa
- Coordinates: 41°50′44″N 94°20′58″W
- Country: United States
- State: Iowa
- County: Guthrie
- Elevation: 1,060 ft (320 m)
- Time zone: UTC-6 (Central (CST))
  - Summer (DST): UTC-5 (CDT)
- Area code: 641
- GNIS feature ID: 457403

Herndon is an unincorporated community in Guthrie County, Iowa, United States.

== History ==
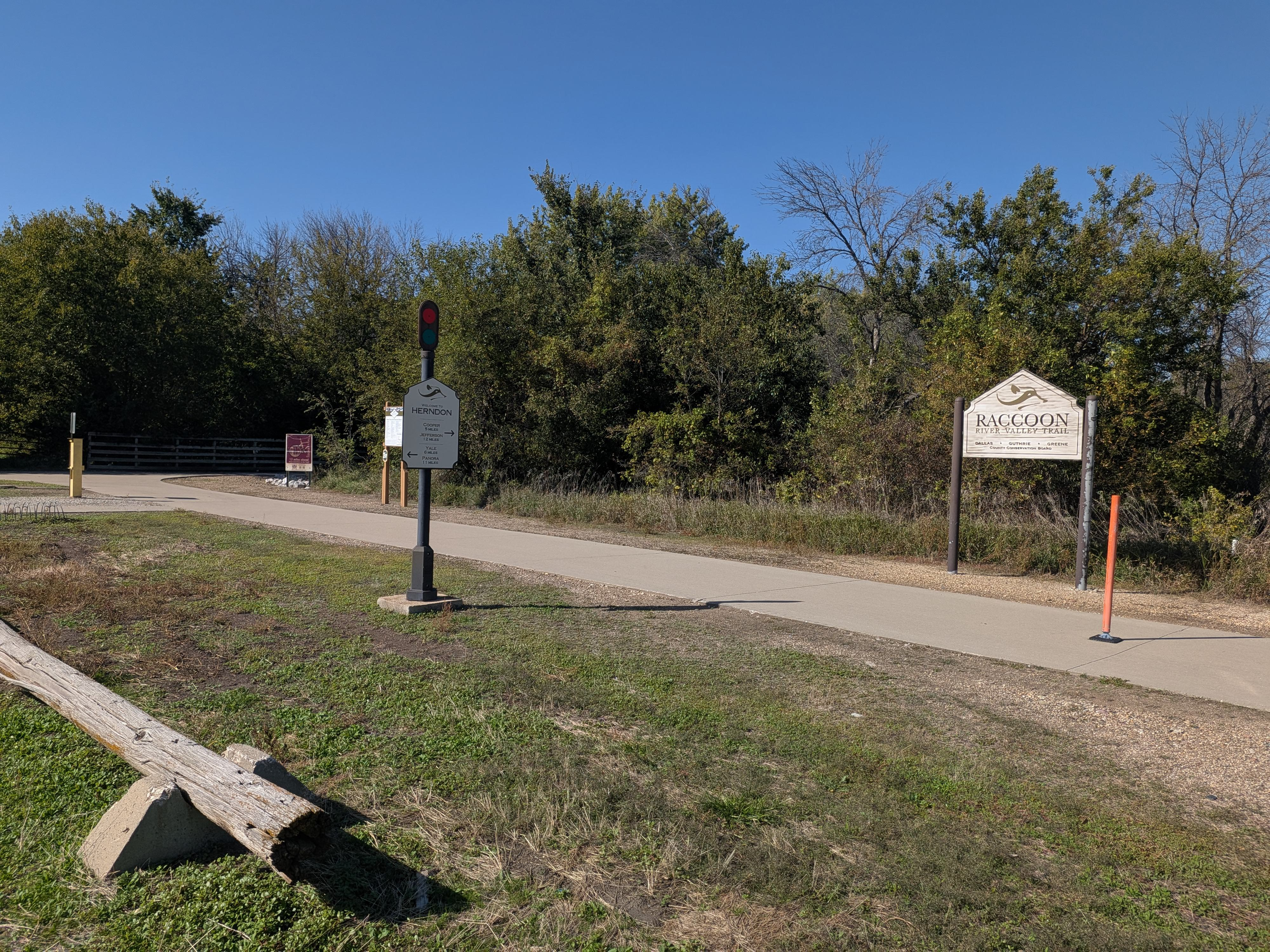
Raccoon River Valley Trail trailhead in Herndon

Herndon was laid out in 1881. The population was 112 in 1940.

== See also ==
- Raccoon River Valley Trail
- Krushchev in Iowa Trail
