= Khrushchev in Iowa Trail =

Planned rail trail in Iowa, United States

Khrushchev in Iowa Trail is a planned rail trail running 17.5 miles (28.2 km) from Herndon, Iowa, to Coon Rapids, Iowa. It is a planned part of the American Discovery Trail.

Originally known as the Corn Diplomacy Trail, the Krushchev in Iowa Trail is to be a paved recreational trail that runs through the counties of Guthrie and Carroll along an abandoned Burlington Northern Santa Fe rail line.

== Trailheads ==
Planned trailheads:

- Herndon
- Bagley
- Bayard
- Coon Rapids

== Connections to other recreational trails ==
A connection is planned at Herndon to the 90 miles (140 km) Raccoon River Valley Trail in Guthrie county. A connection is planned to Carroll, which is a terminus of the 33 miles (53 km) Sauk Rail Trail in Carroll and Sac counties. A third connection is planned between Coon Rapids and Audubon, which is a terminus of the 21.2 miles (34.1 km) T-Bone Trail in Audubon and Cass counties.

== Lemonade Ride ==
The annual 68 miles (109 km) Lemonade Ride is held between Panora and Coon Rapids along portion of the Raccoon River Valley Trail and the Krushchev in Iowa Trail.

== See also ==
- List of rail trails
