= Woodward, Iowa =

- City
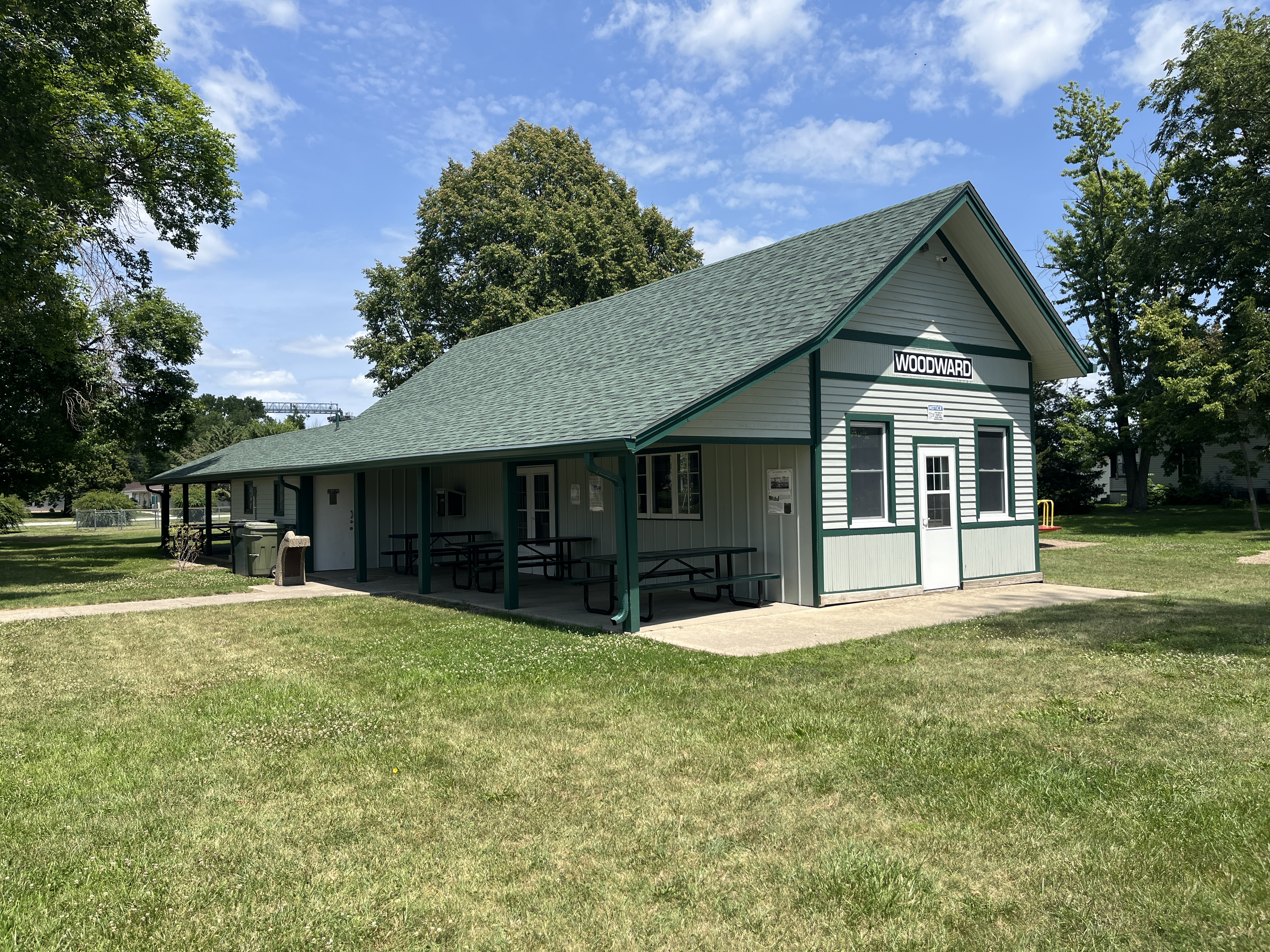
- Railroad depot

- Location of Woodward, Iowa
- Coordinates: 41°51′19″N 93°55′14″W
- Country: United States
- State: Iowa
- County: Dallas

Area
  - Total: 3.65 sq mi (9.46 km^{2})
  - Land: 3.65 sq mi (9.46 km^{2})
  - Water: 0 sq mi (0.00 km^{2})
- Elevation: 1,060 ft (320 m)

Population (2020)
  - Total: 1,346
  - Density: 368.4/sq mi (142.24/km^{2})
- Time zone: UTC-6 (Central (CST))
  - Summer (DST): UTC-5 (CDT)
- ZIP code: 50276
- Area code: 515
- FIPS code: 19-86970
- GNIS feature ID: 2397375
- Website: www.woodwardia.org

Woodward is a city in Dallas County, Iowa, United States. The population was 1,346 at the time of the 2020 census. It is part of the Des Moines–West Des Moines Metropolitan Statistical Area. Woodward is also home to the Woodward-Granger Community School District's middle school and high school, the elementary school being located in Granger.

== History ==
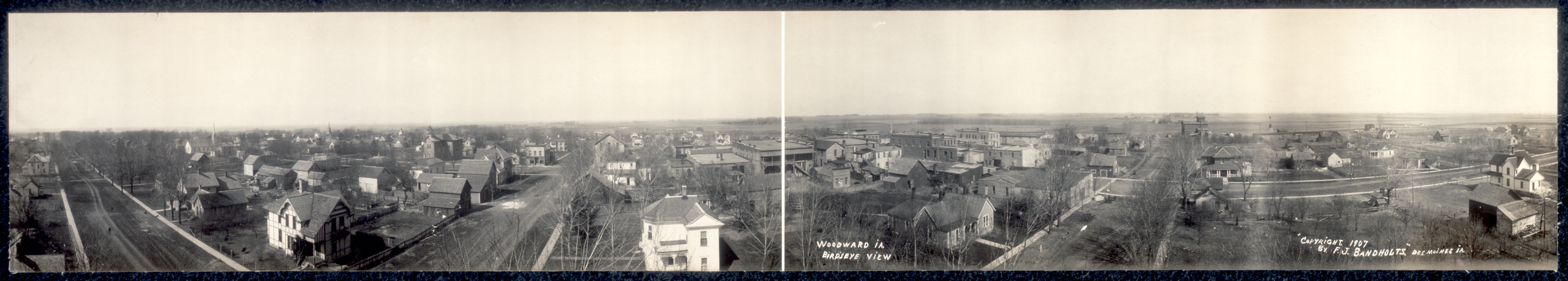
Birds-eye view of the city in 1907

"The town of Woodward was born when the Chicago, Milwaukee, and St. Paul Railway Co reconstructed its lines through the community the depot was constructed. The original name for the town was decided upon as Colton, another town had already adopted the name so the name was changed to Woodward. The City was incorporated in August 1883. The first Council meeting was on December 18, 1883 called to order by Mayor W.S. Craft."

An F-2 tornado struck Woodward, the city of Ames, and several other small Iowan communities on November 12, 2005, devastating many homes in the southeast and east parts of town. There were no deaths in Woodward, although there was one in Stratford. Discovery Channel's series Destroyed In Seconds showed the natural disaster in one of its episodes. During the first season of Dirty Jobs they visited a pig farmer from Woodward in the episode.

== Geography ==
According to the United States Census Bureau, the city has a total area of 2.46 square miles (6.37 km^{2}), all land.

== Demographics ==
Historical populations
Year	Pop.	±%
1890	328	—
1900	550	+67.7%
1910	712	+29.5%
1920	868	+21.9%
1930	901	+3.8%
1940	895	−0.7%
1950	908	+1.5%
1960	967	+6.5%
1970	1,010	+4.4%
1980	1,212	+20.0%
1990	1,197	−1.2%
2000	1,200	+0.3%
2010	1,024	−14.7%
2020	1,346	+31.4%
Source:"U.S. Census website". United States Census Bureau. and Iowa Data Center; Source: U.S. Decennial Census

=== 2020 census ===
As of the 2020 census, there were 1,346 people, 439 households, and 265 families residing in the city. The population density was 368.4 inhabitants per square mile (142.2/km^{2}). There were 491 housing units at an average density of 134.4 per square mile (51.9/km^{2}).

0.0% of residents lived in urban areas, while 100.0% lived in rural areas.

Among households, 25.3% had children under the age of 18 living with them, 44.6% were married couples living together, 10.3% were cohabitating couples, 24.1% had a female householder with no spouse or partner present, and 21.0% had a male householder with no spouse or partner present. 39.6% were non-family households. Of all households, 30.1% were made up of individuals, and 12.5% had someone living alone who was 65 years old or older.

Of housing units, 10.6% were vacant. The homeowner vacancy rate was 3.7% and the rental vacancy rate was 11.3%.

The median age in the city was 34.9 years. 32.9% of residents were under the age of 20; 4.5% were between the ages of 20 and 24; 23.6% were from 25 and 44; 24.1% were from 45 and 64; and 14.9% were 65 years of age or older. 30.1% of residents were under the age of 18. The gender makeup of the city was 57.4% male and 42.6% female. For every 100 females, there were 134.9 males, and for every 100 females age 18 and over there were 113.9 males age 18 and over.

Racial composition as of the 2020 census
Race	Number	Percent
White	1,124	83.5%
Black or African American	82	6.1%
American Indian and Alaska Native	8	0.6%
Asian	9	0.7%
Native Hawaiian and Other Pacific Islander	0	0.0%
Some other race	58	4.3%
Two or more races	65	4.8%
Hispanic or Latino (of any race)	83	6.2%

=== 2010 census ===
As of the census of 2010, there were 1,024 people, 455 households, and 274 families residing in the city. The population density was 416.3 inhabitants per square mile (160.7/km^{2}). There were 503 housing units at an average density of 204.5 per square mile (79.0/km^{2}). The racial makeup of the city was 95.3% White, 1.1% African American, 0.6% Native American, 0.9% Asian, 0.1% from other races, and 2.1% from two or more races. Hispanic or Latino of any race were 2.2% of the population.

There were 455 households, of which 28.4% had children under the age of 18 living with them, 45.3% were married couples living together, 9.2% had a female householder with no husband present, 5.7% had a male householder with no wife present, and 39.8% were non-families. 34.3% of all households were made up of individuals, and 12.1% had someone living alone who was 65 years of age or older. The average household size was 2.25 and the average family size was 2.86.

The median age in the city was 40.4 years. 22.8% of residents were under the age of 18; 8.1% were between the ages of 18 and 24; 24.9% were from 25 to 44; 31.2% were from 45 to 64; and 13.1% were 65 years of age or older. The gender makeup of the city was 47.4% male and 52.6% female.

=== 2000 census ===
As of the census of 2000, there were 1,200 people, 490 households, and 309 families residing in the city. The population density was 1,319.1 inhabitants per square mile (509.3/km^{2}). There were 528 housing units at an average density of 580.4 per square mile (224.1/km^{2}). The racial makeup of the city was 97.33% White, 0.08% African American, 0.33% Native American, 0.83% Asian, 1.00% from other races, and 0.42% from two or more races. Hispanic or Latino of any race were 1.17% of the population.

There were 490 households, out of which 34.9% had children under the age of 18 living with them, 47.8% were married couples living together, 11.4% had a female householder with no husband present, and 36.9% were non-families. 32.2% of all households were made up of individuals, and 14.3% had someone living alone who was 65 years of age or older. The average household size was 2.39 and the average family size was 3.06.

In the city, the population was spread out, with 28.3% under the age of 18, 7.2% from 18 to 24, 29.3% from 25 to 44, 21.8% from 45 to 64, and 13.3% who were 65 years of age or older. The median age was 37 years. For every 100 females, there were 83.8 males. For every 100 females age 18 and over, there were 82.6 males.

The median income for a household in the city was $35,647, and the median income for a family was $43,333. Males had a median income of $29,500 versus $23,625 for females. The per capita income for the city was $19,501. About 4.7% of families and 6.9% of the population were below the poverty line, including 9.3% of those under age 18 and 11.5% of those age 65 or over.

== Government ==
Mr. Brian Devick has served as Mayor since 2011. As of May 2011 the city council members are Ashvin Patel, Jesse A. Purvis, Richard Hartwig, Paul Thompson and Craig DeHoet.

=== Public safety ===
Woodward is served by a volunteer fire department, which has served since 1883.

== Education ==
The Woodward-Granger Community School District operates local public schools.

== Nearby organizations ==
- Woodward State Resource Center is located in Woodward.
- Woodward Academy, located in Woodward, is a boot camp for teenage boys who have been convicted of various crimes.

== See also ==
- High Trestle Trail
