= Bayard, Iowa =

- City
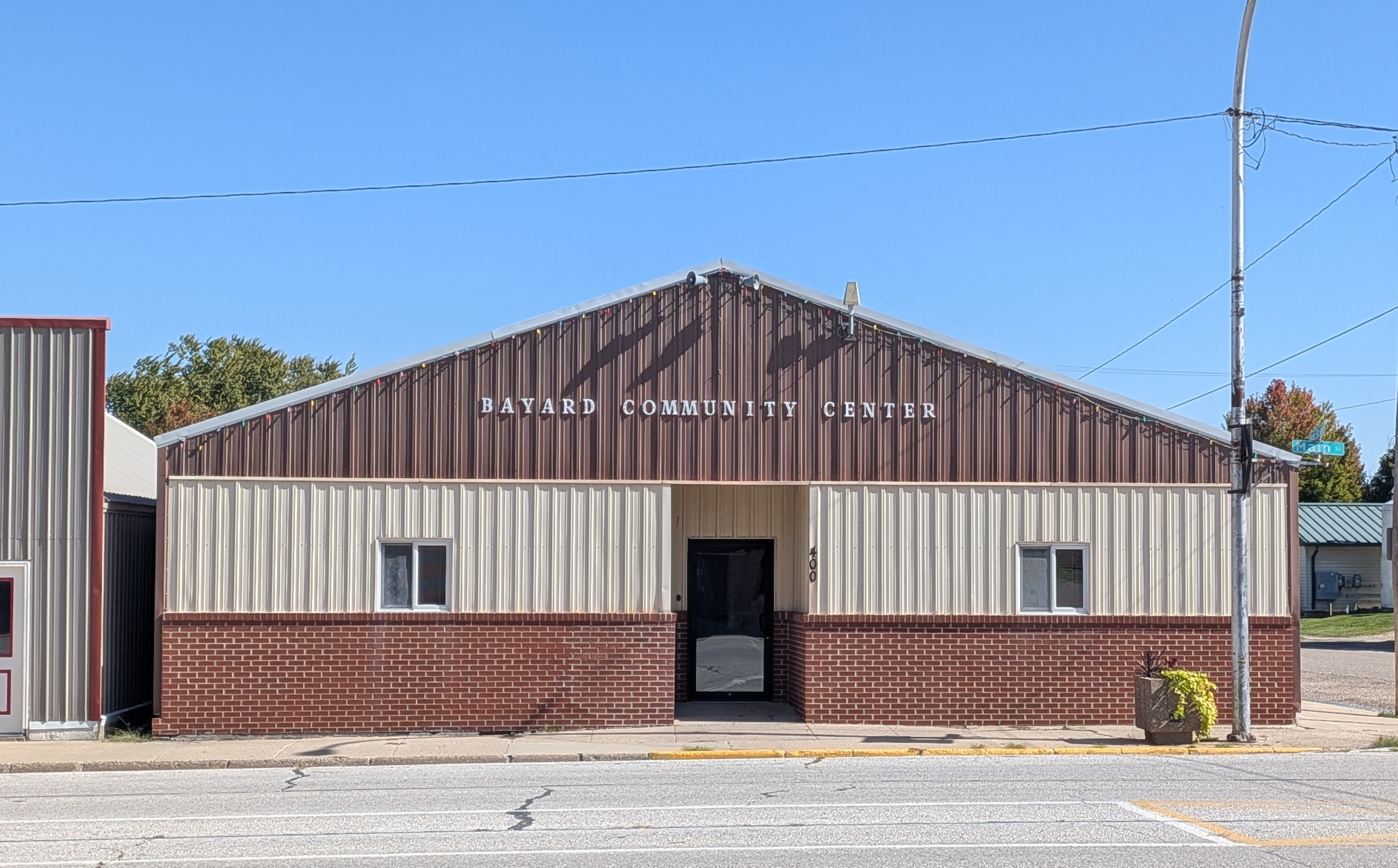
- Bayard Community Center

- Location of Bayard, Iowa

- Location within Iowa Location within the United States Location within North America
- Coordinates: 41°51′8″N 94°33′31″W
- Country: United States
- State: Iowa
- County: Guthrie
- Incorporated: June 14, 1883

Area
  - Total: 0.44 sq mi (1.15 km^{2})
  - Land: 0.44 sq mi (1.15 km^{2})
  - Water: 0 sq mi (0.00 km^{2})
- Elevation: 1,135 ft (346 m)

Population (2020)
  - Total: 405
  - Density: 913.9/sq mi (352.87/km^{2})
- Time zone: UTC-6 (Central (CST))
  - Summer (DST): UTC-5 (CDT)
- ZIP code: 50029
- Area code: 712
- FIPS code: 19-04960
- GNIS feature ID: 2394088
- Website: cityofbayardiowa.com

Bayard is a city in Guthrie County, Iowa, United States. The population was 405 in the 2020 census, a decline from 536 in 2000 census. It is part of the Des Moines–West Des Moines Metropolitan Statistical Area.

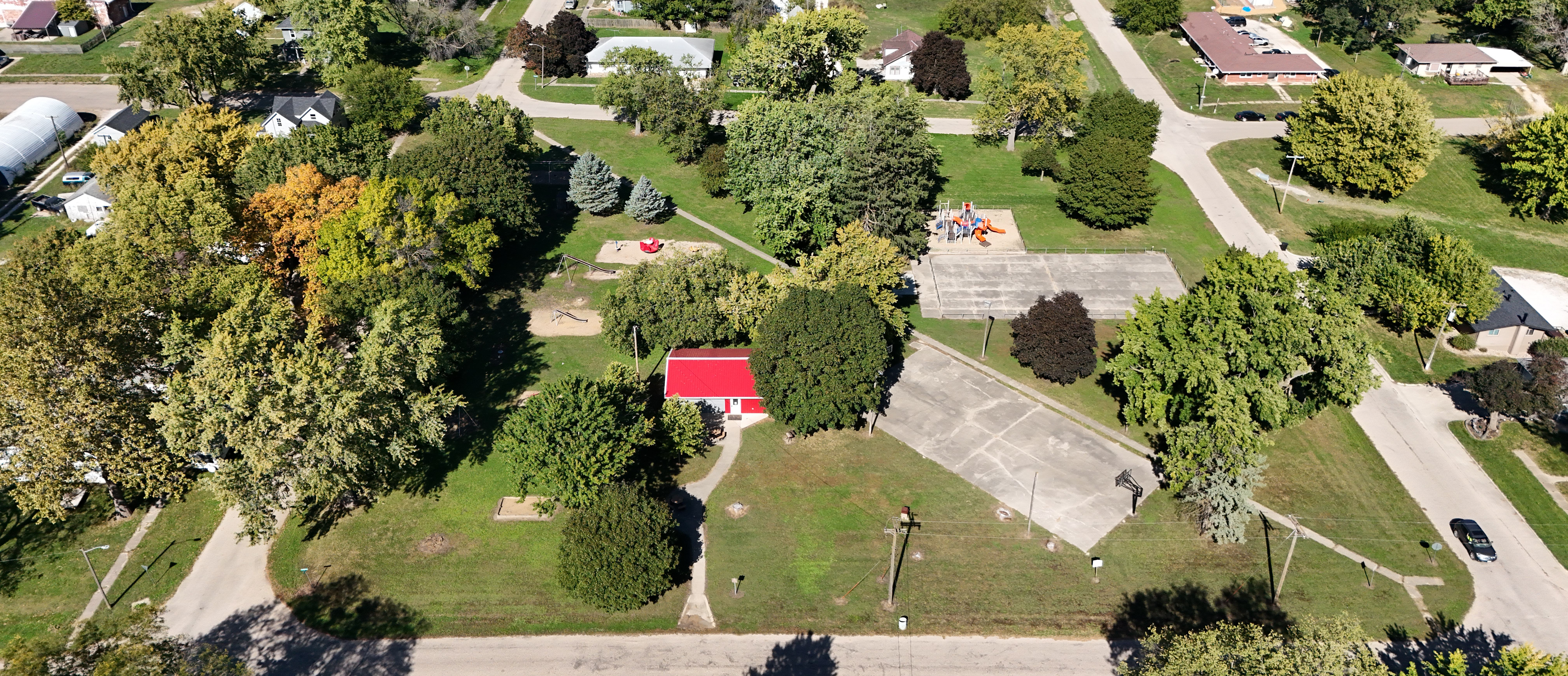
Bayard city park

== History ==
Bayard was platted in 1882.

== Geography ==
According to the United States Census Bureau, the city has a total area of 0.46 square miles (1.19 km^{2}), all of it land.

== Demographics ==
Historical population
| Census | Pop. | Note | %± |
|---|---|---|---|
| 1890 | 348 | | — |
| 1900 | 494 | | 42.0% |
| 1910 | 488 | | −1.2% |
| 1920 | 505 | | 3.5% |
| 1930 | 477 | | −5.5% |
| 1940 | 703 | | 47.4% |
| 1950 | 634 | | −9.8% |
| 1960 | 597 | | −5.8% |
| 1970 | 628 | | 5.2% |
| 1980 | 637 | | 1.4% |
| 1990 | 511 | | −19.8% |
| 2000 | 536 | | 4.9% |
| 2010 | 471 | | −12.1% |
| 2020 | 405 | | −14.0% |
U.S. Decennial Census

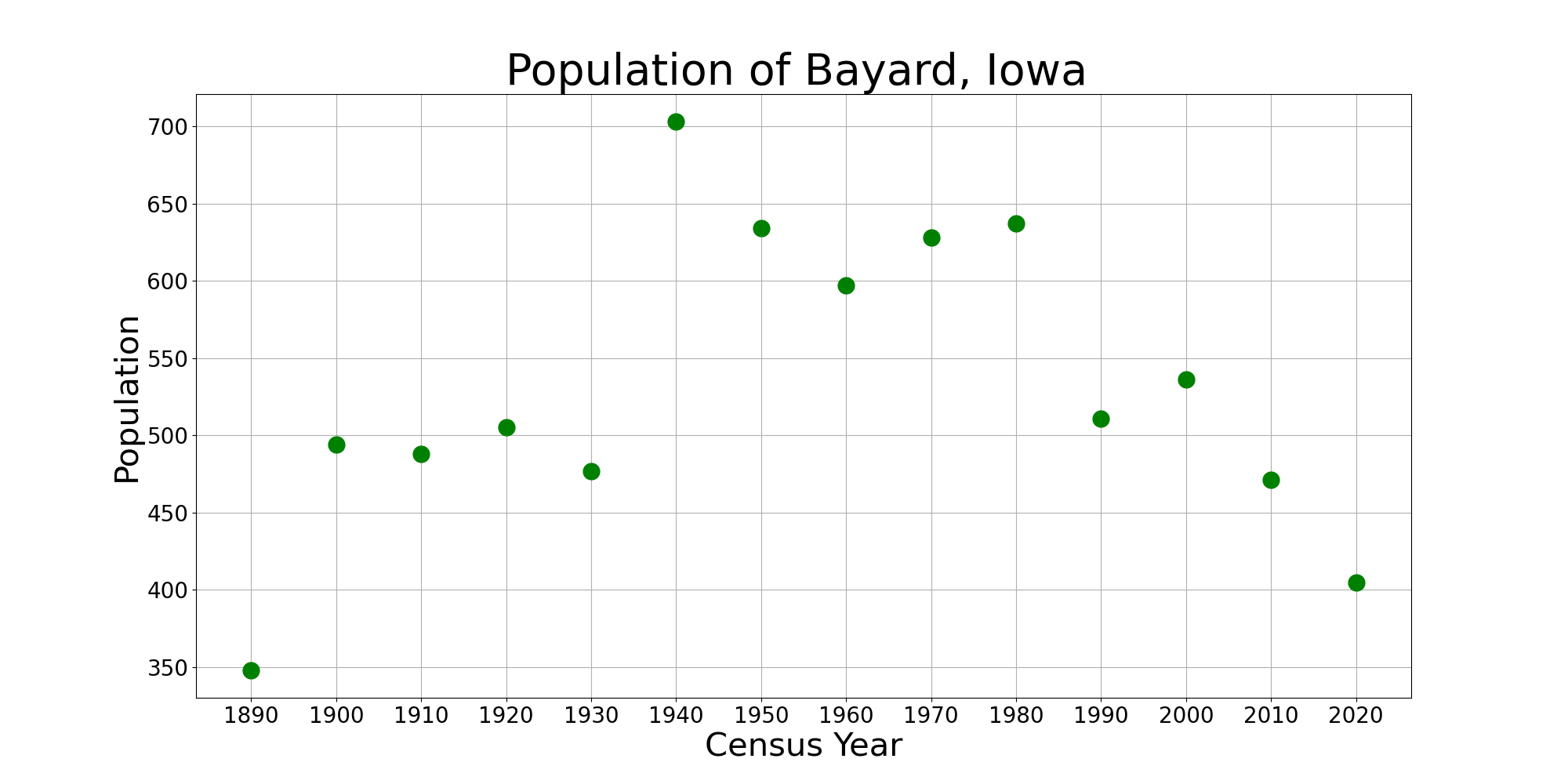
The population of Bayard, Iowa from US census data

=== 2020 census ===
As of the census of 2020, there were 405 people, 183 households, and 110 families residing in the city. The population density was 913.9 inhabitants per square mile (352.9/km^{2}). There were 218 housing units at an average density of 491.9 per square mile (189.9/km^{2}). The racial makeup of the city was 91.4% White, 0.0% Black or African American, 0.2% Native American, 0.2% Asian, 0.5% Pacific Islander, 3.0% from other races and 4.7% from two or more races. Hispanic or Latino persons of any race comprised 3.0% of the population.

Of the 183 households, 28.4% of which had children under the age of 18 living with them, 42.6% were married couples living together, 8.2% were cohabitating couples, 25.1% had a female householder with no spouse or partner present and 24.0% had a male householder with no spouse or partner present. 39.9% of all households were non-families. 35.5% of all households were made up of individuals, 18.0% had someone living alone who was 65 years old or older.

The median age in the city was 41.7 years. 26.4% of the residents were under the age of 20; 6.2% were between the ages of 20 and 24; 22.7% were from 25 and 44; 22.0% were from 45 and 64; and 22.7% were 65 years of age or older. The gender makeup of the city was 51.4% male and 48.6% female.

=== 2010 census ===
As of the census of 2010, there were 471 people, 202 households, and 121 families living in the city. The population density was 1,023.9 inhabitants per square mile (395.3/km^{2}). There were 232 housing units at an average density of 504.3 per square mile (194.7/km^{2}). The racial makeup of the city was 98.7% White, 0.2% African American, 0.4% Asian, and 0.6% from two or more races. Hispanic or Latino of any race were 1.1% of the population.

There were 202 households, of which 28.2% had children under the age of 18 living with them, 48.5% were married couples living together, 5.9% had a female householder with no husband present, 5.4% had a male householder with no wife present, and 40.1% were non-families. 35.6% of all households were made up of individuals, and 15.9% had someone living alone who was 65 years of age or older. The average household size was 2.29 and the average family size was 2.95.

The median age in the city was 39.8 years. 25.1% of residents were under the age of 18; 8.3% were between the ages of 18 and 24; 21.5% were from 25 to 44; 26.5% were from 45 to 64; and 18.7% were 65 years of age or older. The gender makeup of the city was 53.3% male and 46.7% female.

=== 2000 census ===
As of the census of 2000, there were 536 people, 221 households, and 135 families living in the city. The population density was 1,124.9 inhabitants per square mile (434.3/km^{2}). There were 244 housing units at an average density of 512.1 per square mile (197.7/km^{2}). The racial makeup of the city was 99.07% White, 0.19% Native American, 0.19% Asian, and 0.56% from two or more races. Hispanic or Latino of any race were 1.12% of the population.

There were 221 households, out of which 26.7% had children under the age of 18 living with them, 48.4% were married couples living together, 9.5% had a female householder with no husband present, and 38.5% were non-families. 35.7% of all households were made up of individuals, and 23.5% had someone living alone who was 65 years of age or older. The average household size was 2.29 and the average family size was 2.97.

In the city, the population was spread out, with 24.1% under the age of 18, 7.6% from 18 to 24, 19.6% from 25 to 44, 19.4% from 45 to 64, and 29.3% who were 65 years of age or older. The median age was 44 years. For every 100 females, there were 91.4 males. For every 100 females age 18 and over, there were 81.7 males.

The median income for a household in the city was $24,444, and the median income for a family was $32,344. Males had a median income of $27,143 versus $16,477 for females. The per capita income for the city was $13,073. About 16.8% of families and 23.2% of the population were below the poverty line, including 34.3% of those under age 18 and 20.6% of those age 65 or over.

== Government ==
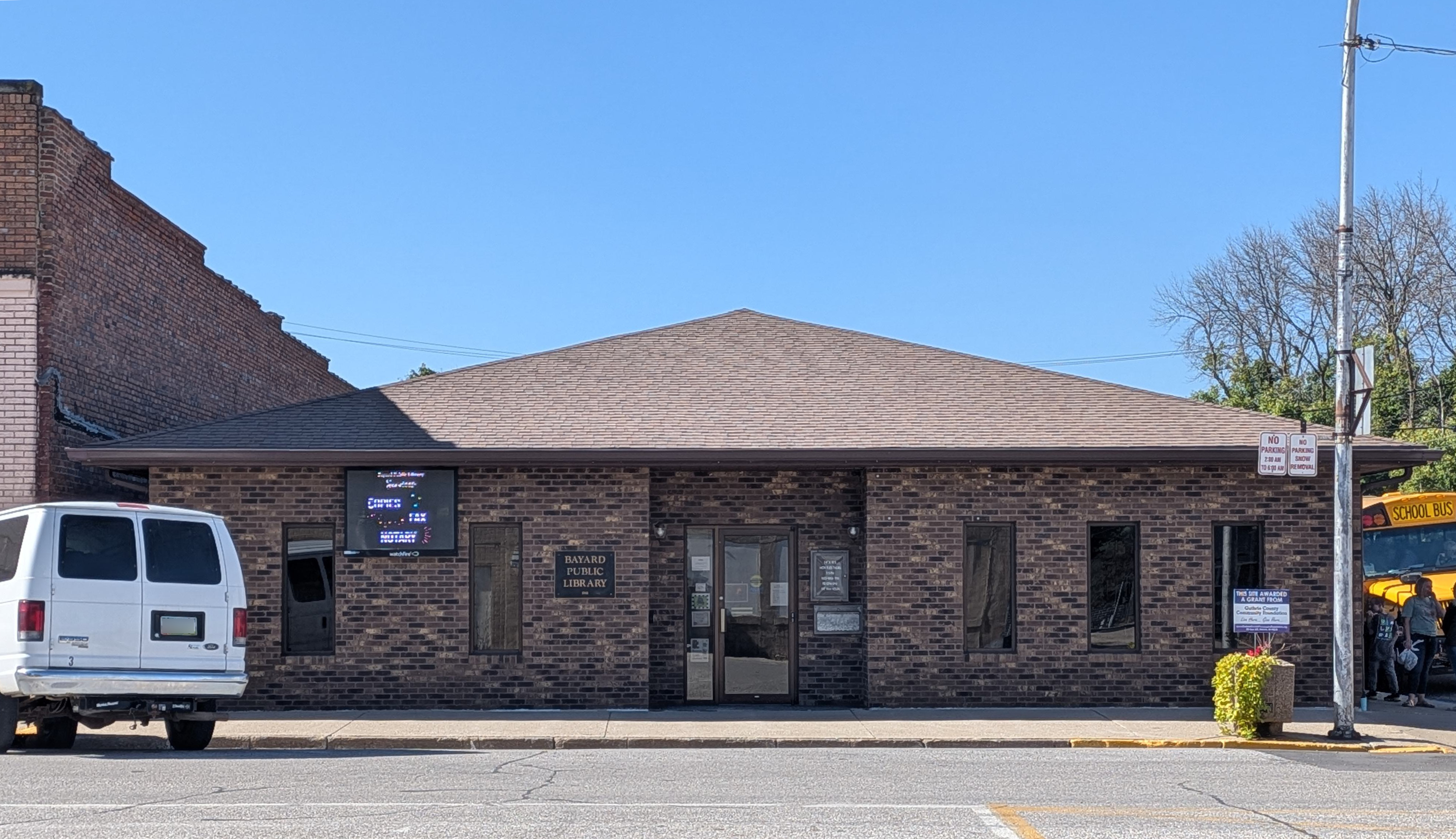
Bayard Public Library

Allen Long was elected mayor in 2015 and will serve until 2019.

Thomas Wardyn was elected mayor in 2020 and will serve until 2024

== Education ==
It is in the Coon Rapids–Bayard Community School District. The district was established on July 1, 1988, by the merger of the Bayard and Coon Rapids school districts.

== See also ==
- Krushchev in Iowa Trail
- Lemonade Ride
