= Clive, Iowa =

- City
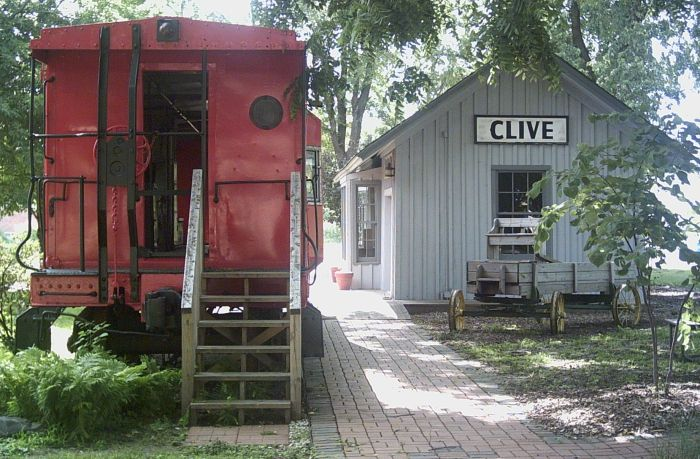
- Restored railroad depot in Clive

- Logo
- Motto: "Distinct by Nature"
- Location of Clive in Iowa
- Coordinates: 41°36′53″N 93°47′53″W
- Country: United States
- State: Iowa
- Counties: Polk, Dallas
- Townships: Walnut (Polk County); Walnut (Dallas County)
- Settled: 1882
- Incorporated (city): August 18, 1956

Government
  - Mayor: John Edwards

Area
  - Total: 7.73 sq mi (20.03 km^{2})
  - Land: 7.64 sq mi (19.80 km^{2})
  - Water: 0.089 sq mi (0.23 km^{2}) 1.56%
- Elevation: 889 ft (271 m)

Population (2020)
  - Total: 18,601
  - Rank: 25th in Iowa
  - Density: 2,433.2/sq mi (939.46/km^{2})
- Time zone: UTC-6 (CST)
  - Summer (DST): UTC-5 (CDT)
- ZIP code: 50325
- Area code: 515
- FIPS code: 19-14520
- GNIS feature ID: 2393573
- Website: www.cityofclive.com

Clive is a city in Dallas and Polk counties in the U.S. state of Iowa. As of the 2020 Census, the population was 18,601. It is part of the Des Moines metropolitan area. Clive is known for its Greenbelt Park and trail system running through the community. Clive serves as the axis of the western Des Moines suburbs, between Urbandale, Waukee and West Des Moines along the major transportation corridors of I-35, I-80 and I-235. The City of Urbandale is to the north to northwest, the City of West Des Moines is to the southeast to southwest, the City of Waukee in Dallas County is to the west.

== History ==
Clive was platted in 1882 but did not incorporate as a city until August 18, 1956. While the exact origin of the city's name is unknown, it is believed to have been named after Robert Clive.

In its early days, Clive was a coal mining town and a railroad shipping point along the St. Louis – Des Moines Northern Railway. The railroad depot, which dates back from 1882, has been restored while the neighboring Swanson House, dating back from 1911, serves as the headquarters for the Clive Historical Society.

After incorporation in 1956, Clive has served as a mostly residential suburb of Des Moines, and the city has grown in both land area and population since that time. Most of Clive's businesses are along 86th Street, Hickman Road (which forms most of the boundary with Urbandale), and University Avenue (which forms the boundary with West Des Moines). Clive has been part of the West Des Moines School District since 1962; the portion of Clive that is in Dallas County is part of the Waukee School District.

== Geography ==
According to the United States Census Bureau, the city has an area of 7.71 square miles (19.97 km^{2}), of which 7.59 square miles (19.66 km^{2}) is land and 0.12 square miles (0.31 km^{2}) is water.

== Demographics ==
Historical populations
Year	Pop.	±%
1960	752	—
1970	3,005	+299.6%
1980	6,064	+101.8%
1990	7,462	+23.1%
2000	12,855	+72.3%
2010	15,447	+20.2%
2020	18,601	+20.4%
Source:"U.S. Census website". United States Census Bureau. and Iowa Data Center; Source: U.S. Decennial Census

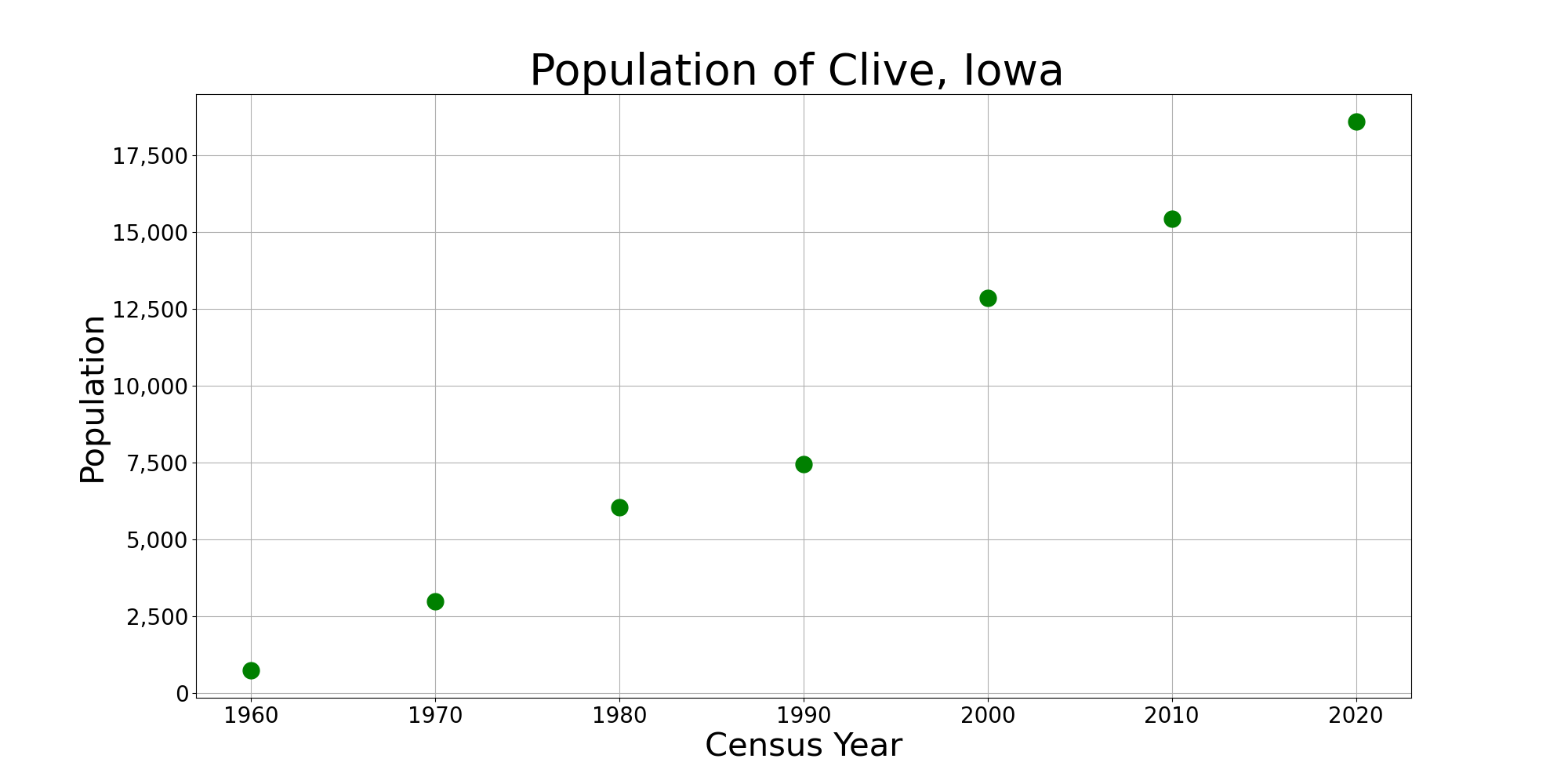
The population of Clive, Iowa from US census data

=== 2020 census ===
As of the 2020 census, Clive had a population of 18,601 with 6,992 households and 5,132 families; the population density was 2,433.2 inhabitants per square mile (939.5/km^{2}).

The median age was 38.9 years; 27.2% of residents were under the age of 18 and 15.6% were 65 years of age or older. Overall, 29.4% were under the age of 20, 4.4% were between the ages of 20 and 24, 25.3% were from 25 to 44, and 25.4% were from 45 to 64. The gender makeup was 49.4% male and 50.6% female; for every 100 females there were 97.7 males, and for every 100 females age 18 and over there were 94.5 males age 18 and over.

99.8% of residents lived in urban areas, while 0.2% lived in rural areas.

Of the 6,992 households, 37.4% had children under the age of 18 living in them, 62.3% were married-couple households, 4.7% were cohabitating couples, 19.7% had a female householder with no spouse or partner present, and 13.3% had a male householder with no spouse or partner present. 26.6% of all households were non-families, 22.5% were made up of individuals, and 10.1% had someone living alone who was 65 years of age or older.

There were 7,270 housing units at an average density of 951.0 per square mile (367.2/km^{2}); 3.8% were vacant. The homeowner vacancy rate was 1.3% and the rental vacancy rate was 6.0%.

Racial composition as of the 2020 census
Race	Number	Percent
White	14,730	79.2%
Black or African American	767	4.1%
American Indian and Alaska Native	57	0.3%
Asian	1,355	7.3%
Native Hawaiian and Other Pacific Islander	11	0.1%
Some other race	505	2.7%
Two or more races	1,176	6.3%
Hispanic or Latino (of any race)	1,371	7.4%

=== 2010 census ===
As of the census of 2010, there were 15,447 people, 5,754 households, and 4,321 families living in the city. The population density was 2,035.2 inhabitants per square mile (785.8/km^{2}). There were 6,077 housing units at an average density of 800.7 per square mile (309.2/km^{2}). The racial makeup of the city was 88.1% White, 2.2% African American, 0.2% Native American, 4.0% Asian, 3.4% from other races, and 2.1% from two or more races. Hispanic or Latino of any race were 7.5% of the population.

There were 5,754 households, of which 39.1% had children under the age of 18 living with them, 64.3% were married couples living together, 7.1% had a female householder with no husband present, 3.8% had a male householder with no wife present, and 24.9% were non-families. 19.0% of all households were made up of individuals, and 5.7% had someone living alone who was 65 years of age or older. The average household size was 2.68 and the average family size was 3.09.

The median age in the city was 37.9 years. 28.3% of residents were under the age of 18; 6% were between the ages of 18 and 24; 27.1% were from 25 to 44; 28.7% were from 45 to 64; and 10% were 65 years of age or older. The gender makeup of the city was 49.8% male and 50.2% female.

=== 2000 census ===
As of the census of 2000, there were 12,855 people, 4,752 households, and 3,630 families living in the city. The population density was 1,778.7 inhabitants per square mile (686.8/km^{2}). There were 4,902 housing units at an average density of 678.3 per square mile (261.9/km^{2}). The racial makeup of the city was 93.05% White, 1.24% African American, 0.08% Native American, 2.88% Asian, 0.01% Pacific Islander, 1.25% from other races, and 1.49% from two or more races. Hispanic or Latino of any race were 2.59% of the population.

There were 4,752 households, out of which 41.9% had children under the age of 18 living with them, 68.9% were married couples living together, 5.5% had a female householder with no husband present, and 23.6% were non-families. 18.2% of all households were made up of individuals, and 2.8% had someone living alone who was 65 years of age or older. The average household size was 2.70 and the average family size was 3.12.

Age spread: 29.5% under the age of 18, 6.1% from 18 to 24, 32.9% from 25 to 44, 26.0% from 45 to 64, and 5.6% who were 65 years of age or older. The median age was 35 years. For every 100 females, there were 98.5 males. For every 100 females age 18 and over, there were 96.0 males.

The median income for a household in the city was $74,127, and the median income for a family was $90,863. Males had a median income of $59,444 versus $34,533 for females. The per capita income for the city was $40,053. About 1.6% of families and 3.5% of the population were below the poverty line, including 3.4% of those under age 18 and 1.6% of those age 65 or over.

== Education ==
West Des Moines Community School District serves a section of Clive. Many of the youth in the Clive area attend the public elementary school, Clive Learning Academy, as a part of the West Des Moines Community School District. Some of the other children attend Crossroads Park Elementary and various private schools. Students living in the Dallas County portion of the city are served by the Waukee Community School District.

== Transportation ==
Transit in the city is provided by Des Moines Area Regional Transit. Routes 3, 52, 72, 74, 92 and 93 provide bus service connecting the city to the region.

== Notable people ==
- Chris Broussard, sports commentator and analyst
- Rocky Lombardi, NFL Quarterback with the Cincinnati Bengals
- Gene Maddox, Iowa state legislator and lawyer, served as mayor of Clive from 1977 until 1992.
- Mick Thomson, Guitarist with Grammy Award-winning band Slipknot.

== See also ==
- Clive Greenbelt Trail
- Iowa Employer Benefits Study
