= Bagley, Iowa =

- City
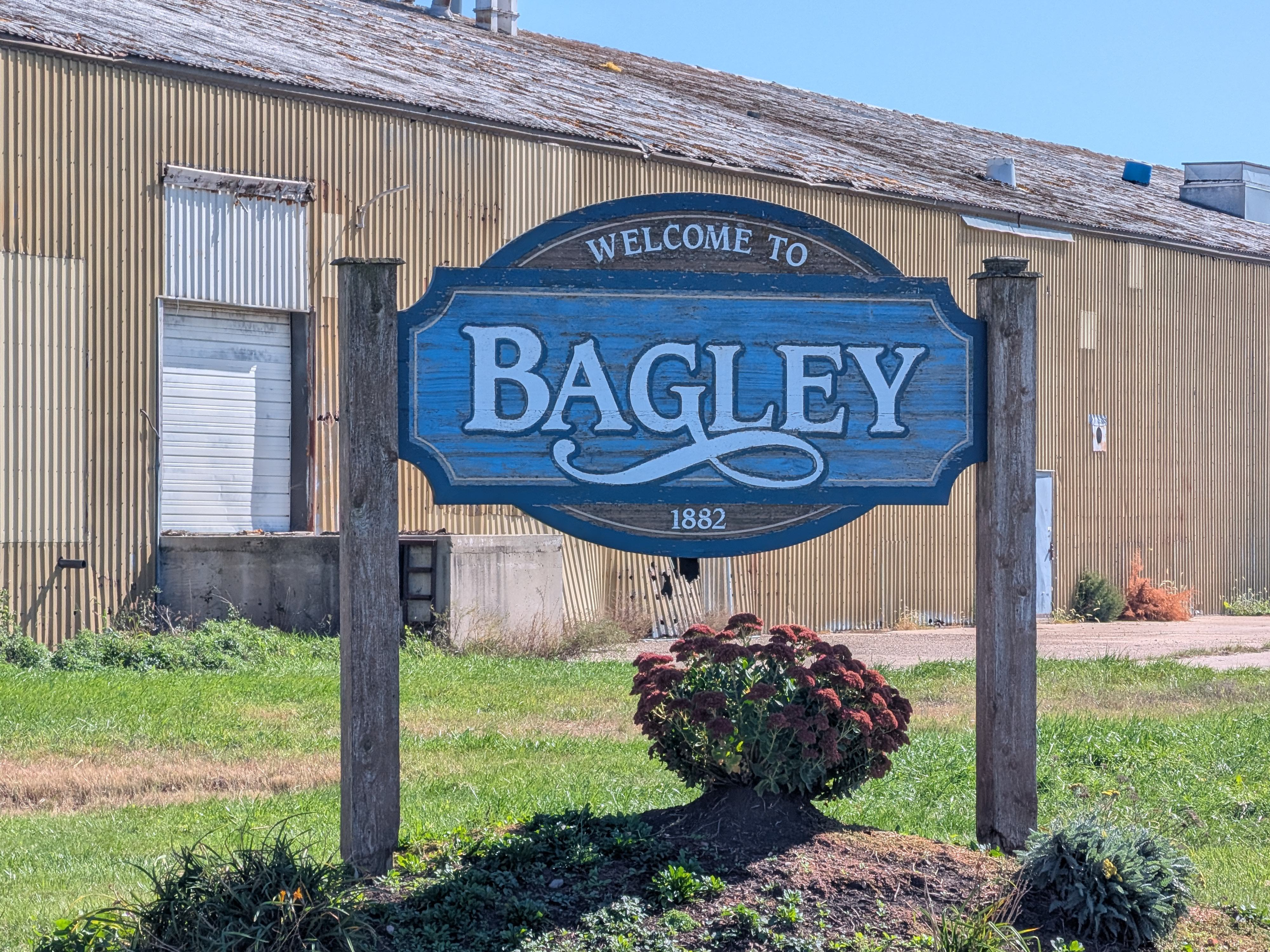
- Bagley welcome sign

- Location of Bagley, Iowa
- Coordinates: 41°50′47″N 94°25′49″W
- Country: United States
- State: Iowa
- County: Guthrie
- Incorporated: June 16, 1891

Area
  - Total: 0.31 sq mi (0.81 km^{2})
  - Land: 0.31 sq mi (0.81 km^{2})
  - Water: 0 sq mi (0.00 km^{2})
- Elevation: 1,109 ft (338 m)

Population (2020)
  - Total: 233
  - Density: 743.9/sq mi (287.22/km^{2})
- Time zone: UTC-6 (Central (CST))
  - Summer (DST): UTC-5 (CDT)
- ZIP code: 50026
- Area code: 641
- FIPS code: 19-04240
- GNIS feature ID: 2394052
- Website: cityofbagley.com

Bagley is a city in Guthrie County, Iowa, United States. The population was 233 in the 2020 census, a decline from 354 in 2000 census. It is part of the Des Moines–West Des Moines Metropolitan Statistical Area.

== History ==
Bagley had its start in the year 1881 by the building of the Chicago, Milwaukee & St. Paul railroad through that territory.

== Geography ==
According to the United States Census Bureau, the city has a total area of 0.31 square miles (0.80 km^{2}), all of it land.

== Demographics ==
Historical population
Census	Pop.	Note	%±
1900	355		—
1910	483		36.1%
1920	505		4.6%
1930	477		−5.5%
1940	427		−10.5%
1950	392		−8.2%
1960	406		3.6%
1970	365		−10.1%
1980	370		1.4%
1990	303		−18.1%
2000	354		16.8%
2010	303		−14.4%
2020	233		−23.1%
U.S. Decennial Census

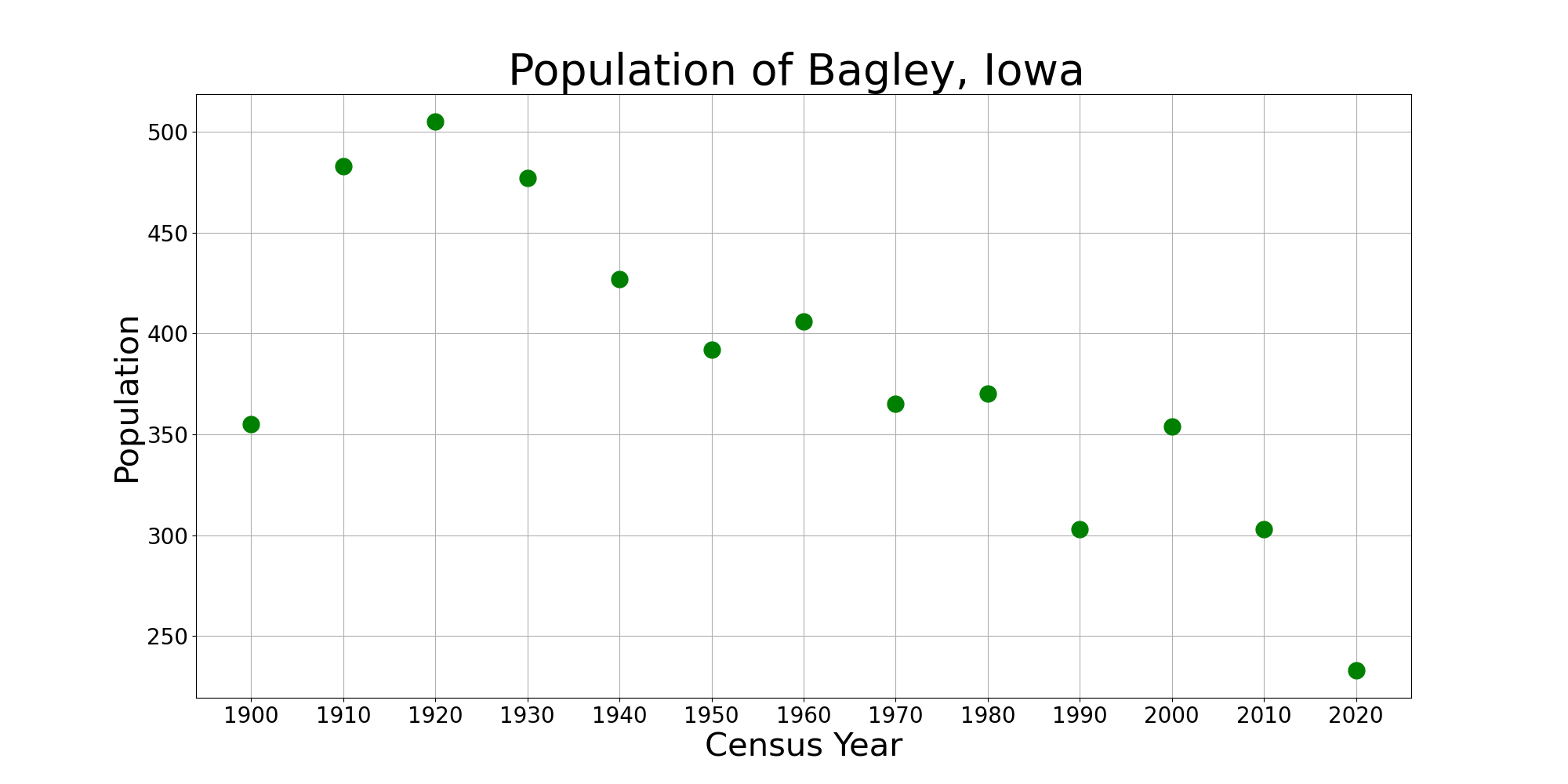
The population of Bagley, Iowa from US population data

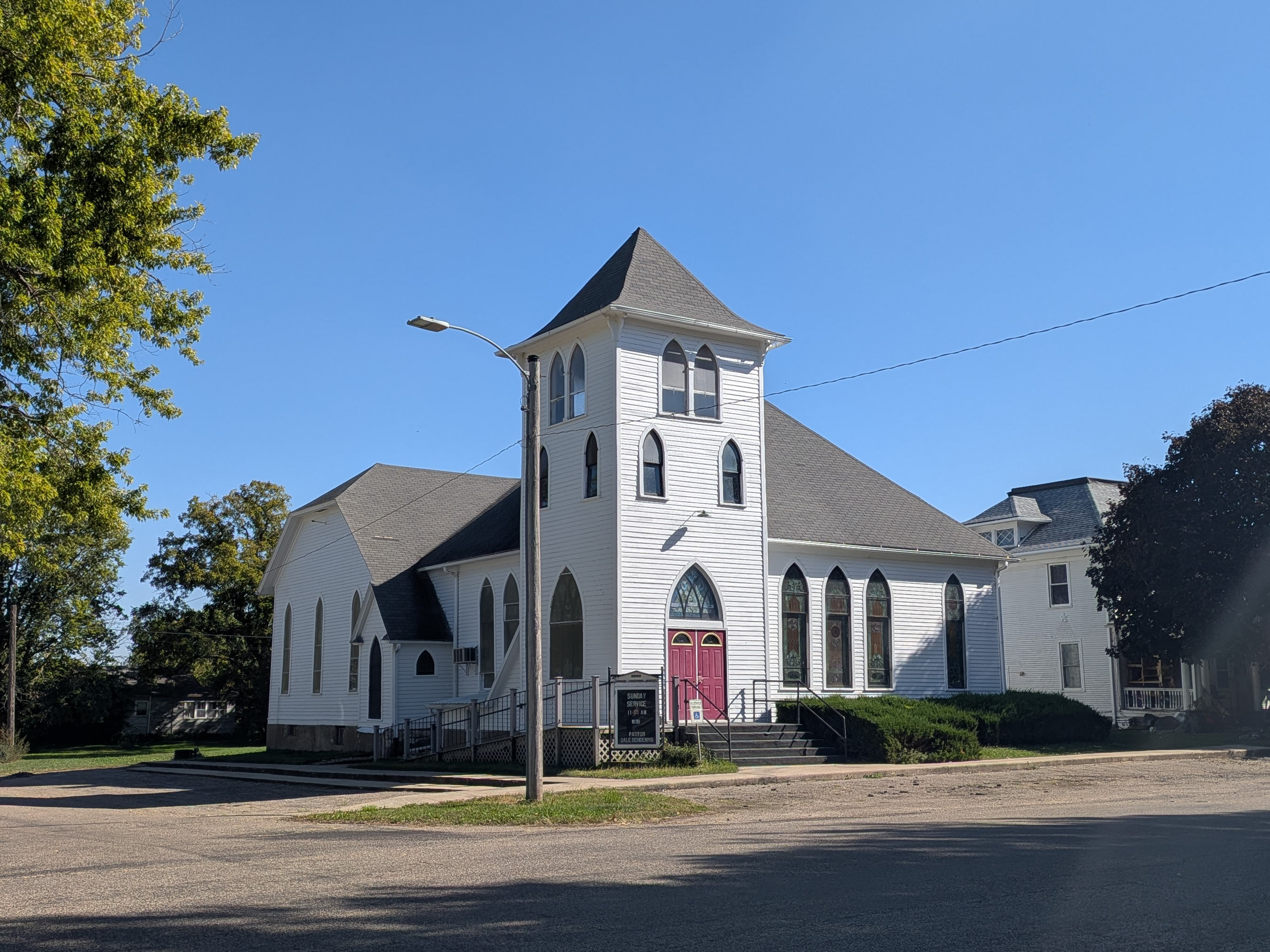
Bagley United Methodist Church

=== 2020 census ===
As of the census of 2020, there were 233 people, 105 households, and 57 families residing in the city. The population density was 743.9 inhabitants per square mile (287.2/km^{2}). There were 143 housing units at an average density of 456.6 per square mile (176.3/km^{2}). The racial makeup of the city was 93.6% White, 1.3% Black or African American, 0.4% Native American, 0.0% Asian, 0.0% Pacific Islander, 1.3% from other races and 3.4% from two or more races. Hispanic or Latino persons of any race comprised 5.2% of the population.

Of the 105 households, 26.7% of which had children under the age of 18 living with them, 41.0% were married couples living together, 8.6% were cohabitating couples, 26.7% had a female householder with no spouse or partner present and 23.8% had a male householder with no spouse or partner present. 45.7% of all households were non-families. 41.0% of all households were made up of individuals, 23.8% had someone living alone who was 65 years old or older.

The median age in the city was 48.5 years. 22.3% of the residents were under the age of 20; 3.9% were between the ages of 20 and 24; 21.0% were from 25 and 44; 27.5% were from 45 and 64; and 25.3% were 65 years of age or older. The gender makeup of the city was 49.8% male and 50.2% female.

=== 2010 census ===
As of the census of 2010, there were 303 people, 123 households, and 81 families living in the city. The population density was 977.4 inhabitants per square mile (377.4/km^{2}). There were 147 housing units at an average density of 474.2 per square mile (183.1/km^{2}). The racial makeup of the city was 93.4% White, 1.7% Native American, 0.3% Asian, 2.3% from other races, and 2.3% from two or more races. Hispanic or Latino of any race were 7.3% of the population.

There were 123 households, of which 28.5% had children under the age of 18 living with them, 51.2% were married couples living together, 7.3% had a female householder with no husband present, 7.3% had a male householder with no wife present, and 34.1% were non-families. 29.3% of all households were made up of individuals, and 9.8% had someone living alone who was 65 years of age or older. The average household size was 2.46 and the average family size was 2.99.

The median age in the city was 41.4 years. 25.4% of residents were under the age of 18; 9% were between the ages of 18 and 24; 21.1% were from 25 to 44; 29.5% were from 45 to 64; and 15.2% were 65 years of age or older. The gender makeup of the city was 53.1% male and 46.9% female.

=== 2000 census ===
As of the census of 2000, there were 354 people, 144 households, and 96 families living in the city. The population density was 1,158.2 inhabitants per square mile (447.2/km^{2}). There were 157 housing units at an average density of 513.6 per square mile (198.3/km^{2}). The racial makeup of the city was 96.89% White, 0.28% African American, 2.26% from other races, and 0.56% from two or more races. Hispanic or Latino of any race were 5.93% of the population.

There were 144 households, out of which 29.9% had children under the age of 18 living with them, 51.4% were married couples living together, 9.7% had a female householder with no husband present, and 33.3% were non-families. 30.6% of all households were made up of individuals, and 16.7% had someone living alone who was 65 years of age or older. The average household size was 2.46 and the average family size was 3.01.

In the city, the population was spread out, with 27.1% under the age of 18, 9.6% from 18 to 24, 26.3% from 25 to 44, 19.2% from 45 to 64, and 17.8% who were 65 years of age or older. The median age was 37 years. For every 100 females, there were 87.3 males. For every 100 females age 18 and over, there were 84.3 males.

The median income for a household in the city was $29,219, and the median income for a family was $38,036. Males had a median income of $26,875 versus $16,429 for females. The per capita income for the city was $13,754. About 9.7% of families and 16.1% of the population were below the poverty line, including 14.1% of those under age 18 and 9.8% of those age 65 or over.

== Government ==
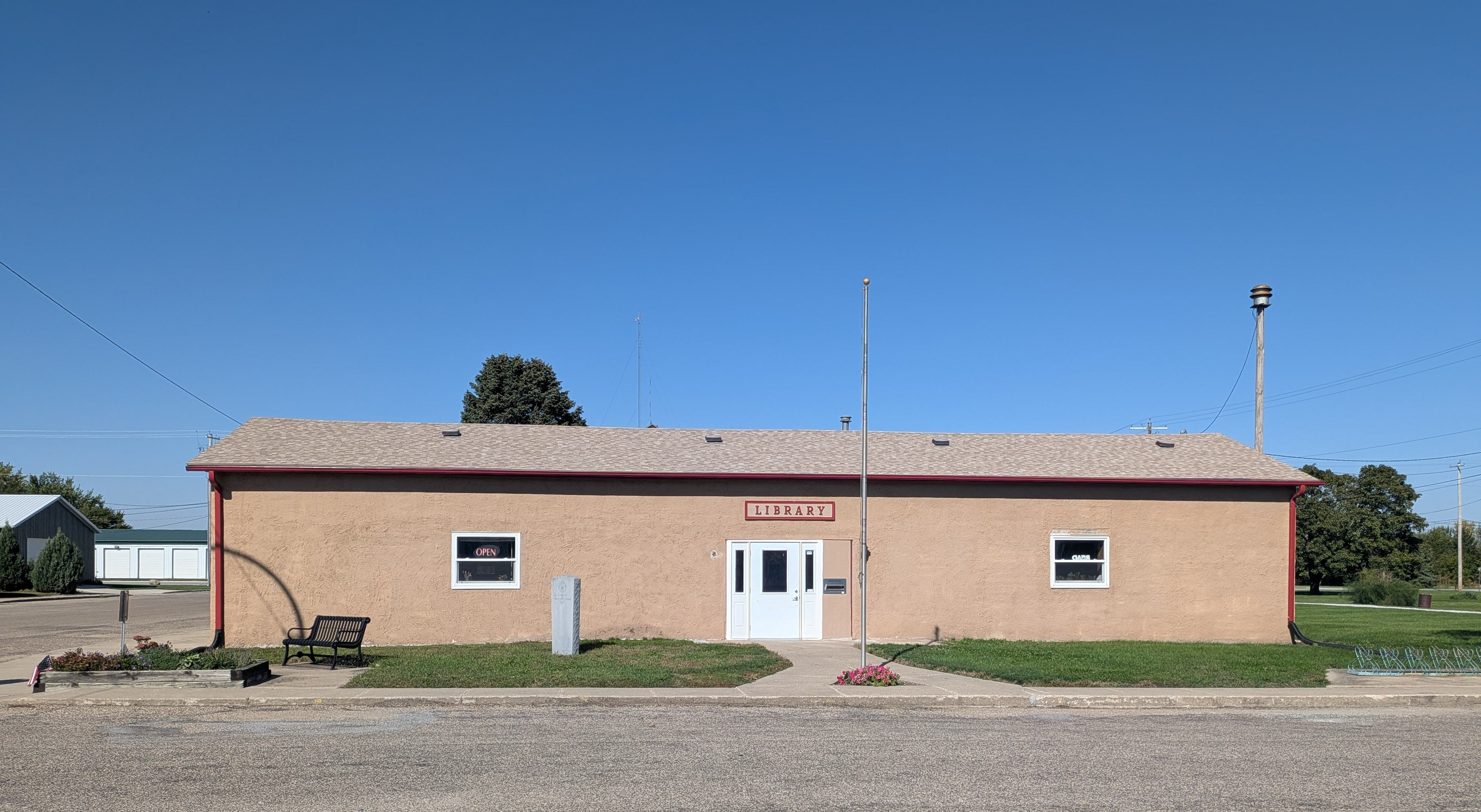
Bagley Public Library

As of November 2025, Amanda Waltz is Mayor. The City Council consists of Emily Chapman-Olesen as Mayor Pro Tempore, Janet Bennett, Kylie Carmichael, Steven Joy, and Mark Mozingo.

== Education ==
Panorama Community School District serves the community. The district formed on July 1, 1989, as a merger of the Panora-Linden and Y-J-B school districts.

== Notable people ==
- Jordan Carstens (1981– ) American football player for the NFL's Carolina Panthers

== See also ==
- Krushchev in Iowa Trail
- Lemonade Ride
