= Clive Greenbelt Trail =

Urban recreational trail in Clive, Iowa, US

Coordinates: 41.6088°N 93.7456°W

Clive Greenbelt Trail is an 11.3 miles (18.2 km) urban recreational trail in Clive, Iowa, and forms part of the Central Iowa Trails network. This very busy recreational trail runs through Polk and Dallas Counties in Iowa. It is a curvy, paved asphalt and concrete trail.

== Route ==
The trail begins at 73rd Street and Walnut Creek at the Walmart in Windsor Heights. It meanders along the north bank of Walnut Creek for 5.5 miles (8.9 km) to Country Club Blvd. Between the Lake Country Club dam and 142nd Street, the trail is on the street near the northshore of Lake Country Club for 0.75 miles (1.21 km). For the next 1.7 miles (2.7 km), the trail travels between 1900 142nd Street (at Lakeview Drive) and Lions Park, which is near Eason Elementary School in Waukee. In western Clive, more trails are being developed north of Hickman Road. Additional links and branches bring the total trail mileage to 11.3 miles (18.2 km). You are able to access many of the parks, libraries, and the aquatic center by way of these trails. There are mile markers and helpful route directions to help you on your way.

== Some access points ==
Parking is available at

- 73rd Street at the Walmart parking lot
- 1400 86th Street - west side of 86th street
- 10490 Maddox Parkway (restrooms): west of 100th Street and south of 7 Flags Fitness & Racquet Club
- 1750 114th Street: Clive Aquatic Center, Clive City Hall, Clive Library
- 11900 Hickman Road: truck stop
- 3904 123rd Street: Campbell Recreation Area
- 15166 Wildwood Drive: Wildwood Park
- 1700 156th Street: Lions Park

Other access points include (addresses are approximate, parking is either limited or not available)

- 7750 University Avenue
- 9250 Swanson Blvd
- east of 100th Street near Play It Again Sports
- 10200 Lincoln Avenue
- Rio Valley Park: 10450 Sunset Terrace or 1750 Rio Valley Drive
- 10500 Greenbelt Drive
- 10800 Lincoln Avenue
- 2000 114th Street
- 2103 128th Street at Walnut Creek Drive
- Raccoon River Valley Trail link
- 13200 Lakeshore Drive
- 13200 Woodlands Parkway
- 1634 Country Club Blvd: south of the spillway for the Lake Country Club dam and across from the boat ramp
- 1900 142nd Street at Lakeview Drive
- 1910 149th Street at Woodcrest Drive and Lakeview Drive
- 600 Woodcrest Drive
- 605 SE Boone Drive at 156th Street: Eason Elementary School, Waukee

== Connections to other trails ==
- Waukee

West of Campbell Recreation Area in Clive, a 2.6 miles (4.2 km) link connects this trail to Waukee and the 56 miles (90 km) Raccoon River Valley Trail, which is part of the American Discovery Trail.

Additionally, Lions Park at 1700 156th Street in Clive links westward to the Waukee trails system.

- West Des Moines

Southward along the eastside of 128th Street, this trail links to the West Des Moines trail system via the sidewalk along the eastside of 60th Street in West Des Moines.

Additionally, from Campbell Recreation Area, this trail links to the West Des Moines trail system via southward along 123rd Street in Clive and West Lakes Parkway in West Des Moines to the sidewalk along the southside of Westtown Parkway in West Des Moines. This connection between the two trail systems has less traffic and is an easier climb.

- Windsor Heights and Urbandale

At 73rd Street and Walnut Creek, this trail connects to the Windsor Heights trail system and a recreational trail north to the Urbandale trail system.

Northside of Little Walnut Creek in western Clive, westside of 156th Street, along 133rd Street, and westside of 100th Street provide connections to the Urbandale trail system.

Future connections from Clive to the Urbandale trails system will be along Douglas Parkway, 149th Street, 142nd Street, and westside of Little Walnut Creek near 128th Street.

- Des Moines and Valley Junction in West Des Moines

East of 73rd Street, the Clive Greenbelt Trail is linked to the Des Moines trail system and Valley Junction in West Des Moines via Walmart and Colby Park in Windsor Heights.

== Detour during construction on Interstate 80/35 near Hickman Road ==
On September 24, 2024, the Clive Greenbelt Trail at Walnut Creek and Interstate 80/35 near the Interstate 80/35 Hickman Road exit closed due to the construction of a new Interstate 80/35 interchange at Hickman Road which includes the construction of a new Interstate 80/35 bridge over Walnut Creek. During this construction, the Clive Greenbelt Trail is closed between NW 114th Street and the Campbell Recreation Park, which is east of NW 128th Street and located at 12853 Woodlands Parkway in Clive. Announced in September 2024, the detour route for bicyclists on the Clive Greenbelt Trail will be generally north and south along the bicycle trail in Urbandale's Timberline Park then generally east and west along both Douglas Parkway and Douglas Avenue between 138th Street and 100th Street in Urbandale then north and south along 100th Street. On the morning of Saturday July 12, 2025, a bicyclist died near 134th Street and Douglas Parkway while riding a bicycle along this detour in Urbandale. The death was due to injuries sustained from a falling Oak tree which struck the bicyclist on the bicycle trail. Following this tragic event, Urbandale officials closed the Timberline Park Trail until further notice while police investigated the cause of the fallen Oak tree.

== See also ==
- List of rail trails
- Raccoon River Valley Trail
