= Titanic: The Complete Story =

Television series

Titanic: Death of a Dream re-released as: Titanic: The Complete Story
- Original film poster
- Directed by: Melissa Jo Peltier
- Written by: Melissa Jo Peltier
- Produced by: Melissa Jo Peltier; Craig Haffner; Donna E. Lusitana
- Narrated by: David McCallum
- Edited by: Yann Debonne
- Music by: Zeljko Marasovich; Christopher L. Stone
- Production companies: A&E Television Networks; Greystone Communications
- Release date: July 24, 1994 (United States)
- Running time: 200 minutes (in four parts)
- Country: United States
- Language: English

Titanic: The Complete Story is a 1994 American two-part documentary chronicling the story of the ocean liner RMS Titanic which sank on its maiden voyage in 1912. It is a compilation of a four-hour documentary special produced by A&E Television Networks in 1994. A&E Home Video originally sold the entire documentary in a 4-tape VHS set and later a DVD release. It is considered by many critics and historians to be the definitive documentary regarding the Titanic. It is most famous for being one of the few Titanic documentaries to feature survivors.

== The documentary ==
The documentary is narrated by actor David McCallum (who played survivor Harold Bride in the 1958 film A Night to Remember) and begins with a quote from first-class passenger Jack Thayer, about how the world's mindset was forever altered by the sinking. Rare interviews with some of the few remaining Titanic survivors, including Edith Brown, Eva Hart, Ruth Becker (who had already died in 1990), Millvina Dean, and Michel Marcel Navratil; discussions with leading historical authorities on the sinking, including Charles Haas, John Eaton, Ken Marschall, Don Lynch and Robert Ballard; and excerpts from survivor's writings and newspaper articles accompany McCallum's telling of the story.

The documentary is presented in two parts:

=== Titanic: Death of a Dream ===
The first half, Titanic: Death of a Dream, encapsulates the first two hours. It tells the story of the RMS Titanic's origins, from its conception and construction, to its maiden voyage, leading up to the initial collision with the iceberg that would ultimately sink the ship.

=== Titanic: The Legend Lives On ===
The second half, Titanic: The Legend Lives On, concentrates on the ship's sinking, its immediate aftermath, and its discovery in 1985 by Dr. Robert Ballard, along with Titanic's continuing legacy.

== Special edition ==
In 2002, the documentary was re-released on DVD as Titanic: The Complete Story – Special Commemorative Edition, supplemented by a third film - the 1998 documentary Beyond Titanic, which is narrated by Victor Garber, who portrayed Titanic designer Thomas Andrews in the 1997 film Titanic. Beyond Titanic tells of the cultural influence of the ship and its sinking, and how its story has continued to be retold through the years through different forms of media.

In 2012, the documentary was again re-released on DVD as simply Titanic: The Complete Story, and included the 2007 documentary Titanic's Achilles Heel. Produced by the History Channel, Titanic's Achilles Heel follows Titanic researchers and historians exploring theories of whether the ship had a fatal design flaw that contributed to its sinking, investigating the wreck of the ship itself, as well as its sunken sister ship, Britannic.

== Cast ==
- David McCallum as Narrator
- Millvina Dean ... Titanic survivor
- Edith Haisman ... Titanic survivor
- Dot Kendle ... Daughter of Edith Brown Haisman
- Eva Hart ... Titanic survivor
- Ruth Becker Blanchard ... Titanic survivor
- Wyn Wade ... Author
- Michael McCaughan ... Ulster Folk and Transport Museum (curator of maritime history)
- Walter Lord ... Author
- Ken Marschall ... Historian, artist
- John P. Eaton ... Author
- Charles A. Haas ... Author
- Frances John Parkinson Jr. ... Son of Titanic woodworker
- Don Lynch ... Historian, author
- Donald Hyslop ... First Southampton City Council (senior oral historian)
- Brian Ticehurst ... British Titanic Society
- Edward S. Kamuda ... Titanic Historical Society (founder and president)
- George Behe ... Titanic Historical Society (vice-president), historian, author
- Michel 'Momon' Navratil ... Titanic survivor
- Leslie Harrison ... Author
- Stanley Tutton Lord ... Son of Stanley Phillip Lord, captain of SS Californian
- Dr. Robert Ballard ... Woods Hole Oceanographic Institution, Center for Marine Exploration (director)
- Jean-Louise Michel ... IFREMER (engineer)
- Arnie Geller ... RMS Titanic, Inc.
- George Tulloch ... RMS Titanic, Inc.
- Paul-Henri Nargeolet ... IFREMER (commander)
- Dr. Stephen Deucher ... National Maritime Museum (head of exhibitions)

== Reception ==
The film received a positive review from DVD Magazine.

=== Awards and nominations ===
- 1995, Nominated for 1995 CableACE Award for "Editing a Documentary Special or Series"
- 1994, Won News & Documentary Emmy Awards 1994 for "Outstanding Achievement in a Craft in News and Documentary Programming"
