= Titanic International Society =

Historical society dedicated to Titanic

- The logo profiles the Titanic, SS Normandie, and SS United States
- Founded: 1989; 37 years ago
- Purpose: Preservation of the history of the Titanic and other ocean liners
- Location: Midland Park, New Jersey, US
- President: Charles A. Haas
- Treasurer: Robert Bracken
- Website: titanicinternationalsociety.org
- Formerly called: Titanic International

The Titanic International Society is an American 501(c)(3) non-profit organization dedicated to preserving the history of the Titanic and the events surrounding its sinking on April 15, 1912, when more than 1,500 people died. The society holds biennial conventions and occasional special events, such as memorial ceremonies at sites associated with the Titanic and a tribute to Titanic writer Walter Lord in his Baltimore hometown. It is one of several organizations worldwide dedicated to the memory of the Titanic.

The society publishes Voyage, an illustrated quarterly journal. In addition to stories about the Titanic and her passengers and crew, other ships related to the Titanic disaster are also covered, such as the SS Californian and the rescue ship RMS Carpathia. Although Titanic is the Society's primary focus, issues of Voyage have also featured other famous ocean liners. The Society's logo reflects these multiple interests, with silhouettes depicting the Titanic, the acclaimed French vessel SS Normandie, and SS United States, the world's fastest liner.

== History ==
=== Founding ===
The Titanic International Society began in 1989 to perpetuate the memory of Titanic. Initially called Titanic International, the newly-formed organization had 50 members in its first year. Among its founding members were Dr. Robert M. DiSogra, Michael Findlay, and Charles A. Haas, all of whom later served as Society presidents. The group desired to promote greater knowledge of the circumstances surrounding the ill-fated White Star Liner's disastrous maiden voyage and the people who sailed aboard her. Haas and another founding member, John P. Eaton, had co-authored Titanic: Triumph and Tragedy in 1986. Titanic International's inaugural meeting took place on Saturday, April 15, 1989, at the Philadelphia Maritime Museum (now the Independence Seaport Museum), with Titanic survivor Louise Kink Pope as guest of honor.

=== 1990s ===
In 1991, Louise Pope again attended the Society's convention in Rochelle Park, New Jersey, which included her visit to the old Pier 54 in Manhattan, where Carpathia had docked with the Titanic survivors. She also participated in that convention's "Dream of Freedom" ceremony at Ellis Island, where the Society presented the Ellis Island National Museum of Immigration with a plaque in memory of the immigrants traveling to America in Third Class on the Titanic, who died at sea when Titanic foundered. The plaque remembered those, "...who never made it to safety and were lost at sea".

Other Titanic survivors attending Society conventions were Edith Haisman, Eleanor Ileen Johnson, Millvina Dean, Michel Navratil, Marjorie Newell Robb, and Frank Philip Aks. Morro Castle survivors Agnes Prince Margolis, Ruth Prince Coleman, and Dolly McTigue, and Andrea Doria survivor Jerome Reinert were honored guests at the 1991 and 1992 conventions, respectively.

==== Memorials to victims ====
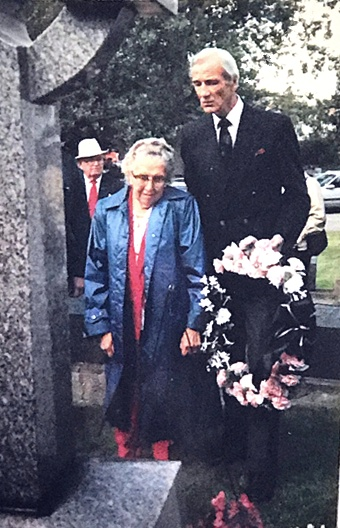
Titanic survivor Louise Pope and Halifax Mayor Ronald Wallace prepare to place a wreath at the graves of Titanic victims, 1991

In 1990–1991, the Society worked to identify six Titanic disaster victims buried in unmarked graves at Fairview Lawn Cemetery in Halifax, Nova Scotia, so that their headstones could be inscribed with their names. In September 1991, more than 50 society members joined a cruise to Halifax aboard the Cunard Line's Queen Elizabeth 2. While there, Society members attended the unveiling of the newly inscribed gravestones, made possible by the society's research. Titanic survivor Louise Pope joined Halifax Mayor Ronald Wallace at the Fairview Lawn Cemetery unveiling ceremonies (pictured). The event was attended by hundreds of Halifax residents and televised by the Canadian Broadcasting Corporation. The QE2's Captain, Robin Woodall, also participated, expressing to the assemblage the Cunard Line's pride in Carpathia's vital role in rescuing the survivors.

In cemeteries in the northeastern U.S., the Society has also provided headstones for the previously unmarked graves of Titanic second-class passenger Marshall Drew; U.S. Sea Post officer John Starr March; third-class passengers Oscar Palmquist and Catherine Buckley; and Robert J. Hopkins, an able seaman aboard Titanic.

In 1993, the society presented a plaque to the Smithsonian Institution's National Postal Museum in Washington, D.C., in memory of the American and British postal service workers who died when Titanic sank. At a New Jersey cemetery where an American Titanic postal worker is buried, a headstone was added by the Society to commemorate his death in the line of duty aboard Titanic, which an existing grave marker omitted. A "Salute to Walter Lord" was held in nearby Baltimore, Maryland, the hometown of the celebrated author. He was feted for his seminal work, A Night to Remember, the narrative of the Titanic disaster which inspired television and film adaptations and led to renewed interest in the ship's fate. Also that year, Society founding members Haas and Eaton made dives to the Titanic's wrecksite. The then 67-year old Eaton was said to be the oldest person at the time to do so. Haas said later that seeing the sunken ocean liner's great size and the devastation at the bottom of the Atlantic Ocean was "emotionally overwhelming". Haas, then a New Jersey high school English and journalism teacher, and Eaton wrote first-person accounts of their expedition experiences for Voyage.

The Cunard Line's former Pier 54 site in Manhattan was revisited in 1997 for an 85th anniversary memorial service. By then, membership had grown to 900 individuals in 24 countries. Producers of the Tony Award-winning musical, Titanic, consulted the Society's archives for accurate portrayal of the play's characters before the show's Broadway debut in 1997. In early 1998, the trustees voted to amend the organization's name to "Titanic International Society". On July 28, 1999, the Society returned to Halifax's Fairview Lawn Cemetery and presented a ceremony "For the Children," remembering the 53 children under age 14 who perished in the disaster.

==== Support for recovery efforts ====
The Society was an early supporter of the efforts by RMS Titanic Inc. to recover, conserve, and exhibit Titanic artifacts, by providing historical information to the company and publishing multiple articles in Voyage about its activities. The Society believes it is important to retrieve artifacts from the disaster before they disintegrate completely and are gone forever, for future generations to see firsthand. Some members served in an advisory capacity as consultants. In 1990, the Society's first full year of operation, it published a featured article, "Recovery and Exploration: The 1987 Titanic expedition offers new insights into its operations, plans", describing the anticipated recovery and exhibition plans. The Society defends the recovery of such artifacts as spoons, luggage, wine bottles, and a portion of Titanic's hull from the wreckage, despite criticism. The Society's journal, Voyage featured the recovery with photos in the Winter 2003 issue.

When George Tulloch, one of the founders of RMS Titanic Inc. died early in 2004, then-Titanic International Society president Michael Findlay lauded his work, saying, "He has done more to preserve the memory of Titanic than anyone else". Shortly before his death, Tulloch had written in Voyage of his hope that future generations would "... understand the reverence and dedication for this tragic story" motivating the salvagers. By 2013, more than 25 million people had visited the Titanic exhibits in Orlando, Atlanta, Los Angeles, Las Vegas, and elsewhere, said Premier Exhibitions (the affiliate of RMS Titanic Inc.).

The Society has occasionally been contacted to authenticate various Titanic-related items. A dollar bill signed by the Titanic's barber, for example, was verified by Society co-founder Michael Findlay and displayed on television by his colleague Charles Haas.

=== 2000–present ===
At its 2003 convention in Newport, Rhode Island, the Society's guest of honor was Lusitania survivor Barbara McDermott. In 2004, the Society's journal, Voyage, featured a cover story on the life of William MacQuitty, who died in February of that year at age 98. MacQuitty was the British producer of the 1958 film, A Night to Remember, which recreated the story of the sinking of the Titanic. As a six-year old, he had witnessed her launch in Belfast. The Voyage cover was headlined, "A gentleman to remember".

At the 2008 convention, members toured sites connected to the White Star Line in New York City, the intended destination of Titanic. In 2011, the Society journeyed to Ireland, where sites connected to the Titanic saga were on the itinerary, in a joint gathering with the Belfast Titanic Society marking the 100th anniversary of the Titanic's launch there in 1911. Included was a visit to the Thomas Andrews Memorial Hall, built in Comber to honor the memory of the Titanic's designer, a tour of the Harland and Wolff shipyard, a visit to the Ulster Folk and Transport Museum to view its Titanic exhibit, and a banquet at Belfast City Hall, attended by 300 guests.

In April, 2012, members of the Society presented lectures to participants aboard two cruise ships sailing to the place in the Atlantic Ocean where Titanic sank a century before, 400 miles (640 km) off the coast of Newfoundland. Aboard the MV Balmoral, Society members were among the 1,309 passengers who sailed from Southampton on April 8, re-tracing Titanic's fateful route across the Atlantic. The Society's Winter 2012 Voyage magazine cover story, "The 2012 Titanic Memorial Cruises", gave extensive illustrated coverage to the centennial commemoration. Charles Haas described the poignant onboard memorial service held on April 15 over the place where Titanic sank. Addressing the Balmoral assemblage, retired Cunard Commodore Ron Warwick said:

"We come together in a spirit of remembrance to give thanks for the lives of the 1,503 men, women, and children lost to the freezing Atlantic 100 years ago tonight, when the Titanic met its end under these stars and on this very spot ... Darkness was on the face of the deep. We remember the families torn apart by this tragedy ..."

At exactly 2:20 am, the moment when the great ship foundered, the Balmoral's whistle gave a sustained blast. As a White Star Line burgee flew from the ship's fantail, three wreaths of remembrance were lowered to the ocean's surface and the crowd sang Eternal Father, Strong to Save, with much emotion, Haas wrote.

A highlight in 2013 was the recovery of a long-lost memorial plaque dedicated to the eight members of Titanic's orchestra, all of whom played to the very end as she sank and went down with the ship. Inscribed on the bronze plaque, commissioned in 1912 by the Musical Mutual Protective Union in New York City, is the legend: "A tribute to the bandsmen of the Titanic. When the order was ‘each man for himself,’ these heroes remained on board and played till the last". It lists bandleader Wallace Hartley and the names of the other seven musicians, surmounted by a figure in relief holding a laurel wreath over the ocean's waves, in tribute to their selfless heroism. Found in a scrap yard, the recovered plaque was rededicated and put on public display at the Titanic The Experience exhibit in Orlando, Florida, on August 15, at a reception co-hosted by the Society and RMS Titanic. The plaque was subsequently acquired in 2016 by the American Federation of Musicians Local 802 in New York City, where it is now displayed in their headquarters lobby.

== Current leadership and activities ==
The Society is led by an eleven-member board of trustees, elected by the membership to three-year terms. From among their number, the trustees elect the Society's three officers – president, treasurer and corporate secretary – and appoint the Society's historian. Officers’ responsibilities are enumerated in the Society's bylaws. Members occasionally make multimedia presentations about the Titanic to the public. As of 2025, Charles Haas is president, and Michael Beatty is treasurer. Like many members, former Treasurer Robert Bracken first became interested in the Titanic after reading Walter Lord's book, A Night to Remember. At the time, he was just in junior high school, reported NJTV. Past-president and founding member Michael Findlay likewise became fascinated by the Titanic saga after doing a book report for school on A Night to Remember, as a 9-year old. Haas told the Saturday Evening Post magazine in 2020 that the Society regularly surveys its members to encourage group affinity.

Co-founder John P. ("Jack") Eaton (1926–2021) was the Society's historian until his death on January 29, 2021. He was an authority on Titanic research, as detailed in the multiple printings of his co-authored book, Titanic: Triumph and Tragedy. Eaton made frequent appearances on television documentaries sharing his wealth of knowledge about the disaster and was an advisor for Titanic-related exhibitions and the National Geographic.

Fall 2018 Voyage cover — the rows of Titanic victims' graves in Halifax, visited during the Society's convention in Nova Scotia's capital

One of the society's principal endeavors is publication of a quarterly journal, Voyage, containing illustrated articles pertaining to the Titanic, her sister ship RMS Olympic, and other famous vessels, and those who sailed them. The controversial role of SS Californian and the rescue ship RMS Carpathia have been covered in depth. Although the Titanic is the Society's primary focus, Voyage has also covered other notable ocean liner disasters, such as those involving the Morro Castle, RMS Lusitania, and the SS City of Benares, which was torpedoed by a German submarine in World War II and sunk while evacuating children from Great Britain to Canada. Past issues have featured other iconic ships as well, such as the Cunard liners Queen Mary and Queen Elizabeth 2.

Conventions are now held every two years, with guest speakers and authors sharing their expert knowledge on maritime subjects (in earlier years, the Society's gatherings were an annual event). In 2007, several worldwide Titanic-interest groups came together in Halifax, Nova Scotia, for the 95th anniversary of the ship's sinking. The British Titanic Society took the lead in planning the event, which the Titanic International Society co-sponsored. Representatives from the Scandinavian Titanic Society, Swiss Titanic Society, German Titanic Society ("Der Deutsche Titanic-Verein"), and the Irish Titanic Historical Society attended. The Society had joint conventions with the Belfast Titanic Society in 2011 and the Titanic Society of Atlantic Canada in 2018. Because of the COVID-19 pandemic, the Society's 2020 convention, planned for Boston, Massachusetts, was rescheduled tentatively for June 2022.

The Society participates in the Coast Guard's annual observance of the disaster, placing a commemorative wreath over the vessel's watery grave in the Atlantic Ocean. On April 15, 2010, the traditional wreath laying in the Atlantic Ocean was preceded by a special memorial service at Fairview Lawn Cemetery in Halifax.

== In the media ==
The society and its individual members are frequently consulted by the news media regarding aspects of the Titanic disaster, especially when the ill-fated liner is in the news, with various trustees responding to queries. On the eve of the December, 1997, release of the film Titanic, Charles Haas was asked about predictions that it would flop, accurately predicting that the film would be a box office hit.

On the 75th anniversary of Titanic's sinking in 1987, Haas explained the public's ongoing fascination with the disaster: "We admire the great display of courage and heroism — latent qualities in people not often seen in this hurry-up world". In a 2020 interview with the Saturday Evening Post magazine, Haas said that the almost three hours it took for the Titanic to sink allowed time for the tragic drama to unfold, "where we see human behavior at its best and its worst". Both Haas and John Eaton appeared in the acclaimed television documentary, Titanic: The Complete Story, produced by A&E Television Networks in 1994 and Haas narrated the Discovery Channel program Titanic: Untold Stories, which featured footage taken during his second dive to the wreck in 1996.

In 2007, the identity of "The Unknown Child" buried in Fairview Lawn Cemetery was finally established by DNA evidence to be Sidney Leslie Goodwin, after having been thought by researchers to be another toddler. The Society had been following the ongoing research closely, having previously published an article, "The Identity of Titanic's Unknown Child", in its Fall 2002 Voyage journal. Haas was asked by USA Today for comment on the new finding. He said, "Science is a fluid thing, it's not set in concrete".

When the last living Titanic survivor, Millvina Dean, died in 2009, Haas called her a "remarkable, sparkling lady". Speaking for the Society, he told the Chicago Tribune, "She knew her place in history and was always willing to share her story with others". The BBC also interviewed him about the death of Dean, whom he had met several times. He told the British audience: "She had a marvelous approach to life. It is almost as if God gave her the gift and she really took advantage of it".

Another book by Eaton and Haas, Titanic: Destination Disaster: The legends and the reality, was subsequently cited by Stephen Brown, et al., in the academic publication, Journal of Consumer Research. In their journal article, "Titanic: Consuming the Myths and Meanings of an Ambiguous Brand", the authors examined the public's fascination with all aspects of the Titanic story and its marketing, while separating fact from fiction. They referred to the book's factual recounting of the ship's construction and launching at the Harland and Wolff shipyards.

In November 2020, two Society trustees appeared on the History Channel's program Titanic: Lost Evidence, one of the History's Mysteries episodes on U.S. television. Also that month, some Society members appeared on the PBS television program, Abandoning the Titanic, part of the Secrets of the Dead series. The show discussed a disputed theory that the Canadian Pacific steamship Mount Temple, and not the Californian, was the “mystery ship” observed in the distance from the decks of the sinking Titanic and that the Californian's captain, Stanley Lord, was wrongly made the scapegoat for failing to reach Titanic before she went down. Although the show was co-produced by Senan Molony, who is a Society member, the controversial claim is not one the Society has endorsed. In other endeavors by individual Society members, three are leading a team designing Titanic: Honor and Glory, a virtual reality game with highly realistic graphics set aboard Titanic.

The Society was approached by the news media when Australian tycoon Clive Palmer announced plans to build and sail a replica, dubbed Titanic II. Haas doubted the likelihood of commercial success such a reincarnation of the original Titanic would have, telling the New York Times, "As good as the Titanic was in her day, it would be a practical and financial disaster", due to the relative lack of onboard activities and amenities today's traveling public expects, such as theaters, casinos, and waterslides. Commenting on the project's appropriateness, Scientific American quoted him as saying, "It's a matter of sensitivity, respect and thoughtfulness ... We commemorate tragedies and those lost in them, not duplicate them".

== See also ==
- International Ice Patrol
- List of maritime disasters
- Passengers of the Titanic
- Titanic Historical Society
