= Haisman =

Haisman is a surname. Notable people with the surname include:

- Edith Haisman (1896–1997), South African-British Titanic survivor
- Gary Haisman (1958–2018), English singer
- Mervyn Haisman (1928–2010), British screenwriter
