= Esther Hart =

Esther Hart may refer to:

- Esther Hart (singer) (born 1970), Dutch singer
- Esther Hart (Titanic survivor) (1863–1928), survivor of the sinking of the RMS Titanic
