= Titanic Historical Society =

Historical society dedicated to the ship

The Titanic Historical Society
- Founded: July 7, 1963; 63 years ago
- Founders: Edward S. Kamuda (1939–2014) and five others
- Purpose: Preservation of the history of the famous ocean liner RMS Titanic
- Location: Indian Orchard, Massachusetts
- Members: 5,000 (as of 1997)
- Historian: Don Lynch
- Vice President: Paul Phaneuf
- Website: www.titanichistoricalsociety.org
- Formerly called: Titanic Enthusiasts of America

The Titanic Historical Society, Inc. (THS) is a non-profit organization founded on July 7, 1963, whose purpose is the preservation of the history of the famous ocean liner RMS Titanic, which sank in 1912, in one of the greatest maritime disasters in history.

The Society publishes a quarterly online magazine, The Titanic Commutator, and operates a museum in Indian Orchard, Massachusetts, featuring artifacts donated by Titanic survivors and other memorabilia collected by founder Edward S. Kamuda. A highlight for the Society members is an annual convention where experts present in-depth information about various aspects of the Titanic catastrophe and memorabilia is available.

== Founding and development ==
Headquartered in Indian Orchard, Massachusetts (United States), the group was formed on July 7, 1963, by Edward S. Kamuda and five others as the Titanic Enthusiasts of America. Besides Kamuda as President, the other founding officers were: Joseph Carvalho - Vice President, Bob Gibbons - Treasurer, Frank Casilio - Secretary, and John Eaton - Historian. In 1968, membership numbered 125 persons, ranging in age from teenagers to almost 90 years of age. Many became interested in the fabled ship after reading of her disastrous fate in Walter Lord's book, A Night to Remember. Membership grew slowly in the early years, reportedly just 300 a decade later in 1973. By 1977, the organization had adopted its current name and membership had increased to 1,476 persons, along with 35 then still-living survivors of the disaster. Twenty years later in 1997, the Society had grown to 5,000 members.

For many years, the remaining survivors of the Titanic's ill-fated maiden voyage were honored guests at the society's conventions. In 1992, the Society commemorated the 80th anniversary of the disaster in Boston, Massachusetts. The event brought together several living survivors, including Eva Hart, Louise Pope, Michel Marcel Navratil, and Beatrice Sandstrom, who enthralled those in attendance with their vivid first-person accounts of the night the Titanic foundered in the north Atlantic Ocean. Walter Lord, author of his seminal Titanic work, A Night to Remember, was another featured guest. Other presenters at Society conventions include artist Ken Marschall and Robert Ballard, who discovered the wreckage of Titanic in 1985.

== Current activities ==
Principal activities of the Titanic Historical Society include:

- Quarterly publication of an online magazine, The Titanic Commutator.
- The Titanic Museum in Indian Orchard featuring an extensive collection of artifacts donated by Titanic survivors, called by the Tampa Tribune: "... the largest collection of non-salvaged Titanic artifacts and memorabilia in the world".
- An annual membership convention where experts present in-depth information about various aspects of the Titanic catastrophe and memorabilia is available.

The Society also endeavors to preserve the history of other ocean liners, especially the Titanic's sister ships, the White Star Line's Olympic and Britannic (which sank after hitting an enemy mine in World War I), and the Cunard ship Lusitania. The society also publishes articles about various other famous ships, such as the Queen Mary and Normandie, in The Titanic Commutator.

The media frequently seeks comment and advice when Titanic is in the news. On the 75th anniversary of her sinking, the Society's then-President Haas explained the public's ongoing fascination with the disaster: "We admire the great display of courage and heroism — latent qualities in people not often seen in this hurry-up world". Both Kamuda and Society Historian Don Lynch appeared in the acclaimed television documentary, Titanic: The Complete Story, produced by A&E Television Networks in 1994. In 1997, the Society participated in the filming of James Cameron's hit film Titanic and some members appeared on-screen as extras.

Although the Society supports exploration of the Titanic wreck site, it opposes salvage of items from the ship, stating in a 2005 Commutator issue, "the wreck is a gravesite to those that died that night and should be treated as a memorial" to the lives lost. Both the Titanic Historical Society and the Titanic International Society, formed in 1989 by former Titanic Historical Society officers Charles Haas and John Eaton, participate with the U.S. Coast Guard and the International Ice Patrol in the annual April 15 wreath-drop ceremony over the Atlantic Ocean where the Titanic now rests.

=== Titanic Museum ===
The Society maintains the Titanic Museum in Indian Orchard, Massachusetts, featuring an extensive collection of artifacts donated by Titanic survivors. Started by Ed Kamuda, it has been called by the Tampa Tribune: "... the largest collection of non-salvaged Titanic artifacts and memorabilia in the world".

=== The Titanic Commutator magazine ===
The Titanic Commutator

Since its founding in 1963, the Society has regularly distributed a journal to members, The Titanic Commutator. Initially a mimeographed newsletter sent to 200 subscribers, the publication steadily increased in scope and depth over the years, eventually printed quarterly as a full-color illustrated magazine of some 50 pages, reporting on Titanic research and passenger stories, along with other notable ships from the "Golden Age" of transatlantic steamship travel. At the time of the production of James Cameron's film, Titanic, the Commutator provided extensive, behind-the-scenes coverage of set construction and details not shown in the final movie release. Following the February–April 2020 issue, the Society discontinued the print edition of the Commutator, although an online version continues to be available behind a paywall to members. Kamuda's widow, Karen, continues as editor.

== See also ==
- Titanic International Society
