= Edward Kamuda =

Edward S. Kamuda

Edward Stephen Kamuda (November 10, 1939 – April 13, 2014) was an American historian who specialized in the study of the RMS Titanic. The Titanic sank on April 15, 1912, after striking an iceberg in the north Atlantic Ocean. Kamuda devoted much of his life to the preservation of the Titanic's legacy as the founder and president of the Titanic Historical Society. Much of his research focused on the biographies of the crew and passengers of the RMS Titanic.

Kamuda first became interested in the Titanic disaster as a teenager, when he saw the 1953 film Titanic at his father's movie theater in Indian Orchard, Springfield, Massachusetts. Later, when the film A Night to Remember played at the theater in 1958, he obtained the publicity package accompanying the film, which included a contact list of survivors. Using the list, Kamuda began collecting their letters of first-person accounts and other donated memorabilia.

On July 7, 1963, he co-founded the Titanic Historical Society with five other people at his Indian Orchard home. According to Kamuda, he started the society after he'd met one of the survivors of the sinking, and was corresponding with him when he'd died and the survivor's remaining family members threw all of his keepsakes, including materials relating to the Titanic, in the local dump, and Kamuda realized a group needed to be founded to preserve other crucial Titanic materials and accounts from survivors. The society was originally called the Titanic Enthusiasts of America, but Kamuda changed its name after a widow of a Titanic passenger questioned their "enthusiasm" for the disaster which killed 1,517 people, including her husband. Kamuda, who served as the president of the Titanic Historical Society, saw the society's membership grow to thousands during his lifetime. Under his leadership, the Titanic Historical Society became one of the world's leading centers for the research of the RMS Titanic, as well as its passengers and crew.

Kamuda and other members of the society served as consultants for the 1997 film, Titanic, directed by James Cameron. Kamuda helped Cameron with the historical details of the set and story. In return, Cameron cast Kamuda and his wife, society vice president Karen Kamuda, as extras in the film. Before shooting their scene, James Cameron told the assembled Titanic cast and crew, "Because of these two people we are here today." The director also introduced Kamuda to several actors, telling them, "Here's the man who made it all possible." Ed and Karen Kamuda can be seen in the background on the ship's promenade while Leonardo DiCaprio (who plays Jack Dawson) teaches Kate Winslet (Rose DeWitt Bukater) how to spit. Edward Kamuda, who was initially reluctant to appear onscreen in the film, later described the experience on set in a 1997 interview with The Republican, "To look at the books for 40 years and then to walk the decks of the ship - it was a dream come true."

In 2012, Kamuda, on behalf of the Titanic Historical Society, presented the city of Springfield, Massachusetts, with the Titanic Centennial Memorial, a 10,000 pound, black granite monument to commemorate the 100th anniversary of the disaster. The Titanic Centennial Memorial, which was dedicated in the Oak Grove Cemetery, includes the names of two Springfield residents who died on the Titanic: Jane Carr, 47, a third class passenger and Milton C. Long, 29, a first class passenger and son of a Springfield mayor and judge.

Ed Kamuda died from a long illness at his home on April 13, 2014, at the age of 74. He was survived by his wife, Karen Kamuda. Kamuda is buried at Oak Grove Cemetery in Springfield, Massachusetts.
