= Louise Kink =

Swiss-American Titanic survivor (1908–1992)

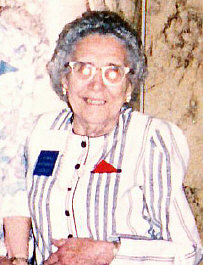
- Kink at the 80th Anniversary Convention of the Titanic Historical Society
- Born: April 8, 1908; Zürich, Switzerland
- Died: August 25, 1992 (aged 84); Milwaukee, Wisconsin, U.S.
- Spouse: Harold Pope (m. 1932, divorced)
- Parent(s): Anton Kink and Luise Heilmann

Louise Gretchen Kink Pope (April 8, 1908 – August 25, 1992), or Louise Kink, was a Swiss-American woman who was one of the last remaining survivors of the sinking of RMS Titanic on April 15, 1912.

== Early life ==
Louise Kink was born on April 8, 1908, in Zürich, Switzerland, to storekeeper Anton Kink and his wife, Luise Heilmann. In 1912, the Kinks decided to immigrate to Milwaukee, Wisconsin, United States, along with Anton's brother, Vinzenz, and sister, Maria.

== Aboard Titanic ==
Louise and her parents boarded RMS Titanic as third-class passengers on April 10, 1912, at Southampton, England. Anton and his brother were in a cabin on G-Deck while his wife, sister, and daughter occupied a cabin at the ship's stern.

Anton and Vinzenz were awoken by Titanic's collision with an iceberg at 11:40 pm on April 14, and viewed the iceberg upon running to the ship's well deck. They returned to their cabin and dressed, barely finishing before water began to pour into their cabin. Anton ran to his wife's cabin and woke its occupants. The entire Kink family made their way to deck, but Maria and Vinzenz were lost in the crowd. Louise and her mother were loaded into Lifeboat No. 2, but Anton had to remain on the deck. At the last minute, Anton jumped into the lifeboat as it was being lowered. In an interview appearing on April 24 in the Milwaukee Journal, he was quoted as saying:

"A sailor took my child and handed her into one of them [lifeboats]. My wife was also helped in by the sailors. I was touched upon the shoulder and asked to step back, whereupon my wife and child cried at the top of their voices at my being left behind. I ducked down, broke through those standing about and jumped into the boat as it was lowered."

All three survived and were picked up by the rescue ship RMS Carpathia. Vinzenz and Maria both died during the sinking and their bodies, if recovered, were never identified.

Louise and her parents arrived in New York City aboard the Carpathia on April 18 and spent the first four days in St. Vincent's Hospital. Anton's uncle sent the family money to purchase train tickets to Milwaukee and they departed New York City on April 22, arriving two days later. Upon arriving home, Anton rented a farm where he and his family lived. In 1919, Anton and Luise divorced and Anton returned to his native Austria, where he remarried. Luise herself remarried, but refused to discuss the Titanic disaster with anyone.

== Marriage ==
In 1932, Kink married Harold Pope and the couple had four children. They divorced shortly after the birth of their fourth child.

== Later years ==
In her later years, Kink became more involved in Titanic-related activities. Shortly after the wreck was discovered in 1985 at the bottom of the Atlantic, she testified before the U.S. House of Representatives Committee on Merchant Marine and Fisheries, urging protection of the site as a memorial.

In 1987, Kink joined several survivors at a convention in Wilmington, Delaware, commemorating the 75th anniversary of the sinking. In 1988, she was present at another convention organized by the Titanic Historical Society held in Boston, Massachusetts, and was guest of honor in 1989 at the inaugural convention of the Titanic International Society in Philadelphia, Pennsylvania. In 1990, Kink was guest of honor on Ellis Island as a plaque remembering those lost immigrating to the U.S. was formally dedicated. In September 1991, she joined Halifax Mayor Ronald Wallace at the Fairview Lawn Cemetery in Halifax, Nova Scotia, Canada, for ceremonies commemorating the Titanic International Society's identification of six previously unknown Titanic victims buried there.

Despite having had tuberculosis, arthritis, and breast cancer, Kink returned to Boston yet again in 1992 to participate in the Titanic Historical Society's convention marking the 80th anniversary of the maritime disaster. In April 1992, she was guest of honor in New Jersey at a Titanic-related play.

== Death ==
Kink died on August 25, 1992, from lung cancer in Milwaukee, Wisconsin. She was 84 years old. She is buried next to her mother at Sunnyside Cemetery in Menomonee Falls. On the front of their gravestones are the following words: "American Immigrants, Survivors of the Titanic Disaster, April 15, 1912".
