= Eva Hart =

British survivor of RMS Titanic (1905–1996)

Eva Hart MBE
- Hart in 1993
- Born: 31 January 1905; Ilford, Essex, England
- Died: 14 February 1996 (aged 91); London, England
- Known for: Being a surviving passenger of the Titanic and one of the last to recall the event.
- Parents: Benjamin Hart (father); Esther Ada Bloomfield (mother)

Eva Miriam Hart MBE (31 January 1905 – 14 February 1996) was an English Titanic survivor and one of the last remaining passengers to recall the sinking of RMS Titanic on 15 April 1912. She was seven years old at the time of the disaster, travelling as a second-class passenger with her parents, Benjamin and Esther Hart. Her father perished in the sinking while Eva and her mother survived.

Hart became a prominent voice in Titanic history, known for her vivid though often contradictory recollections and outspoken advocacy for maritime safety. She was awarded an MBE in 1974 for public and political service and remained active in public life until her death in 1996.

== Early life ==
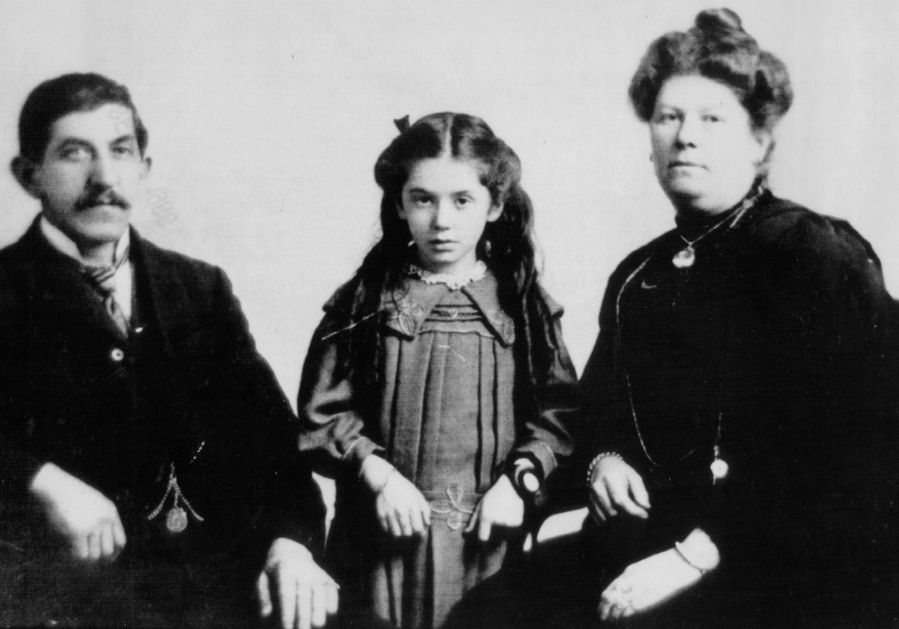
Hart (centre), with her father Benjamin (left) and her mother Esther (right)

Eva Miriam Hart was born on 31 January 1905 in Ilford, Essex (now part of Greater London), England. Her parents were Benjamin Hart and his wife Esther Ada (née Bloomfield). Eva was their only child.

Esther had been previously married to George Hossack Arthur Brooke and had nine children from her first marriage, but none of them survived. Esther remarried to Benjamin Hart in 1900. Eva was educated at St. Mary's Convent (later St. Mary's Hare Park) in Gidea Park, London.

In early 1912, Benjamin decided his family would emigrate to Winnipeg, Manitoba, Canada. He was influenced by his brother, who already lived there, and by economic recessions in England at that time, in his decision to emigrate.

== Aboard Titanic ==
Eva was seven years old when she and her parents boarded Titanic as second-class passengers on 10 April 1912. They had been booked on the SS Philadelphia, but a coal strike at Southampton that spring kept her from sailing and many of her passengers were transferred to Titanic. Eva's mother allegedly felt uneasy about Titanic and feared that some catastrophe would happen; the hubris of calling a ship unsinkable was, in her mind, flying in the face of God. With such fear, Eva's mother slept only during the day and stayed awake in their cabin at night fully dressed.

Eva was sleeping when Titanic struck an iceberg at 11:40 pm on 14 April. Her mother was awake at the time and felt "a slight bump". She immediately asked her husband to investigate the disturbance and he reluctantly left the cabin. Upon his return, he alerted her and Eva to the collision and, after wrapping Eva in a blanket, he carried her to the boat deck. Eva's father placed his wife and daughter in Lifeboat No. 14 and told her to "be a good girl and hold Mummy's hand". It was the last thing he ever said to her and the last time she ever saw him; he perished in the sinking and his body, if recovered, was never identified. Eva and her mother were rescued the following morning by the rescue ship RMS Carpathia.

== Later life ==
Soon after arriving in New York City on 18 April, Eva and her mother returned to England, because her mother never wanted to set sail for New York in the first place. Esther and Eva lived in Chadwell Heath, near London, with Esther's parents. Esther Hart died from cancer on 7 September 1928, in Romford, London, England at age 65.

Hart was plagued with nightmares following the disaster. After the death of her mother, when she was 23, Hart confronted her fears head-on by booking a ticket on a passenger ship heading to Singapore, upon which she locked herself in her cabin for four straight days until the nightmares went away.

Hart had several jobs during her life. She was a professional singer in Australia, a Conservative Party organiser, and a magistrate. As a volunteer in the Second World War, Hart organised entertainment for the troops and distributed emergency supplies to people after The Blitz. She was a member of Soroptimist International of East London until her death in 1996, serving as club president during 1970–71 and as a member for 34 years.

In the 1974 New Year Honours List, Hart was appointed a Member of the Order of the British Empire (MBE) "for political and public services in London." It was presented to her by the Duke of Kent during the Three-Day Week.

=== Commentary about the disaster ===
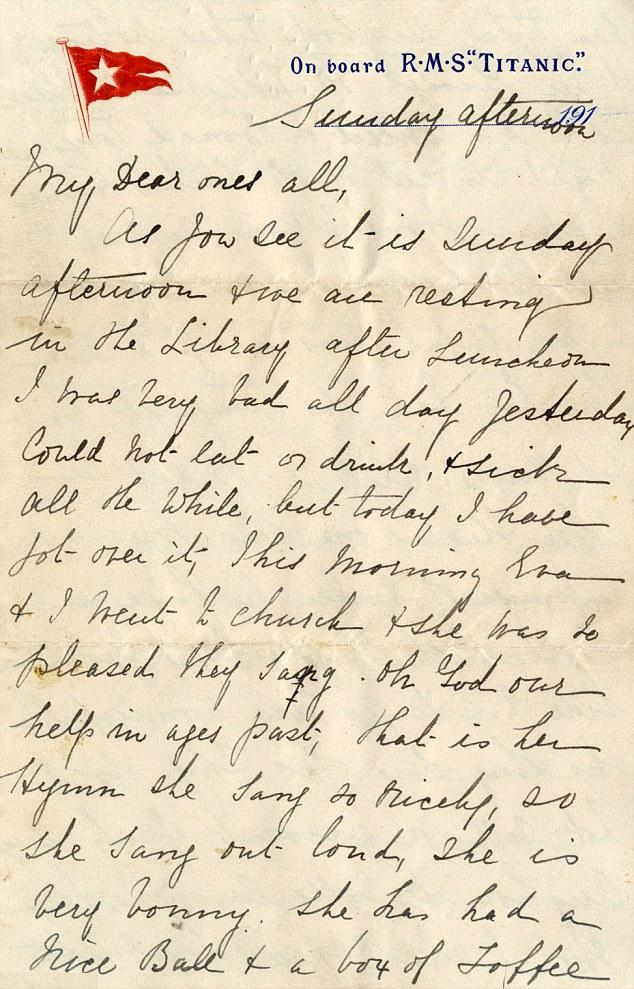
Letter written by Eva and her mother Esther, to Eva's grandmother, on the night of the sinking. It was auctioned in April 2014 for the price of £119,000. It only survived because it had been placed in Benjamin Hart's jacket which was given to her to keep her warm. It is reported to be the last written communication from the RMS Titanic.

Hart frequently criticised the White Star Line for failing to provide enough lifeboats for all aboard Titanic: "If a ship is torpedoed, that's war. If it strikes a rock in a storm, that's nature. But just to die because there weren't enough lifeboats, that's ridiculous." The official report of the British Inquiry suggests, however, that additional boats would not necessarily have made any difference; the crew did not properly launch all of the boats it had in the available time, and there was no advance information given to the crew on what should be done in the event of emergency.

Hart initially stated that she did see the ship sink but later changed her story, saying that the ship had broken in half, She was also adamant regarding the controversy surrounding SS Californian, a ship that was only a few miles from Titanic and yet failed to respond to distress rockets and calls for help. Hart claimed the vessel was less than 10 miles (16 km) from Titanic, not 19 miles (31 km) as was previously believed:

I saw [the Californian]. It was terribly close...I didn't see a ship nineteen miles away. I saw a ship that was so close; and they said at the time it was less than nine miles away, [and yet] now they're trying to say it was nineteen... I saw it you know, and it wasn't just 'lights on the horizon' – you could see it was a ship. And I saw our rockets being fired, which that ship must have seen. Well, this inquiry says that they did see it but they didn't think it was a portent of danger. I would have thought in the middle of the Atlantic in the middle of the night that rockets must mean trouble.

When salvaging efforts at the wreck site began in 1987, Hart was quick to note that Titanic was a gravesite and should be treated as such. She often decried the "insensitivity and greed" and labelled the salvagers "fortune hunters, vultures, pirates, and grave robbers." In Titanic: The Complete Story, she stated:

I hope severely that they will never attempt to raise part of it. I do hope they will remember this is a grave – a grave of 1,500 people who should never have died, and I don't think you should go down there and rob graves and I'm very much opposed to it.

Hart remained active in Titanic-related activities well into her 80s. In 1982, she returned to the US and joined several other survivors at a Titanic Historical Society convention commemorating the 70th anniversary of the sinking. She participated in three more conventions in 1987, 1988, and in 1992. In 1994, she wrote an autobiography, Shadow of the Titanic – A Survivor's Story, in which she described her experiences aboard the ship and the lasting implications of its sinking. On 15 April 1995, the 83rd anniversary of the disaster, she and fellow second-class Titanic survivor Edith Brown dedicated a memorial garden plaque on the grounds of the National Maritime Museum in London.

In April 2012, an audio walking guide to Titanic memorials in Southampton was produced, featuring audio clips of Hart talking about her experience. The guide takes the listener on a walking route around Southampton, where Titanic set sail on her maiden voyage. Being seven years old at the time of the sinking, she maintained several vivid memories:

We went on the day on the boat train. I was 7, I had never seen a ship before. It looked very big. Everybody was very excited. We went down to the cabin and that's when my mother said to my father that she had made up her mind quite firmly that she would not go to bed in that ship. She would sit up at night. She decided that she wouldn't go to bed at night and she didn't! One fact about the beautiful Titanic is that some said the Titanic was 'unsinkable' but now it went world wide that the Titanic has sunk and there were an estimated 700-1,500 survivors. "I saw that ship sink," Hart said in a 1993 interview. "I never closed my eyes. I didn't sleep at all. I saw it, I heard it, and nobody could possibly forget it. I can remember the colours, the sounds, everything... The worst thing I can remember are the screams. It seemed as if once everybody had gone, drowned, finished, the whole world was standing still. There was nothing, just this deathly, terrible silence in the dark night with the stars overhead. Hart recalled hearing the ship's band playing "Nearer My God to Thee" as the ship succumbed to the ocean.

== Death ==
Hart died from cancer on 14 February 1996, at a hospice in London, at the age of 91. Her death left eight remaining survivors. In her memory, near to where she lived in Japan Road, is a pub called "The Eva Hart."

== In popular culture ==
Hart's connection to the Titanic and her active involvement in later years made her popular in numerous forms of media, including mentions in non-fiction books, museums and exhibitions.

- Several Titanic documentaries, including Titanica in 1995, feature interviews with Hart.
- Shadow of the Titanic, published by Chadwell Publishers in 1994, is the biography of Hart written by Professor Ronald C. Denney in collaboration with her. Various republications have been released since its first publication, with minor changes.
- Eva and Little Kitty on the Titanic, is a children's book published by Sidsel Media in 2012, based on Hart's account of the disaster.
- James Cameron's 1997 film Titanic features a scene where a father says to his daughter, "You hold Mummy's hand and be a good little girl"; this is a reference to Hart's father, Benjamin, who spoke similar words the night of the disaster, when she was put into a lifeboat. An interview with her was also included in a behind-the-scenes documentary about the 1997 film.
- Hart was portrayed by Tanya Cohen in the 1998 TV documentary Titanic: Secrets Revealed.

On 26 April 2014, a letter written by Esther on that fateful day was sold at an auction for the price of £119,000. It only survived because it had been placed in the husband's jacket, which was given to her to keep her warm. It is reported to be the last written communication from the RMS Titanic.
