= Don Lynch =

RMS Titanic researcher

Don Lynch is a historian with the Titanic Historical Society. He co-authored the book Titanic: An Illustrated History in 1992 with Ken Marschall and later co-authored Ghosts of the Abyss. Lynch has an extensive collection of Titanic memorabilia and even more extensive knowledge of the subject, having researched the RMS Titanic along with Marschall since the early 1970s. His research includes interviews with survivors of the maritime disaster and dives to the Titanic shipwreck at the bottom of the Atlantic Ocean. He has collaborated with several other authors and documentary filmmakers as a consultant and archival material supplier. Lynch has appeared on several television documentaries about the sinking of the Titanic.

Lynch assisted James Cameron during the production of the film Titanic in 1997 and also appears, uncredited, in the film as passenger Frederic Spedden. In his scene he watches his character's son spin a top on the boat deck. He also played the ship's designer Thomas Andrews for re-enactment scenes in Ghosts of the Abyss.

At one time Lynch also worked as Controller for a division of a major defense company.

== Other works ==
- Images of America - West Adams by Don Lynch, Suzanne Tarbell Cooper, and John Kurtz.
