= Ken Marschall =

American painter and illustrator

- Born: October 28, 1950 (age 75); United States
- Occupations: Painter, illustrator

Ken Marschall (born October 28, 1950) is an American painter and illustrator notable for his paintings of famous ocean liners, such as the RMS Titanic, RMS Lusitania, and HMHS Britannic, and other transportation vessels including the Bismarck, LZ 127 Graf Zeppelin and LZ 129 Hindenburg. His paintings have been used in many books about the Titanic, most notably his depictions of the sinking, of which no photographs that could be used were taken.

In 1992, Marschall co-authored the book Titanic: An Illustrated History with Don Lynch. This book later served as the blueprint for the movie Titanic. Marschall has also served as consultant to many works about the Titanic, including James Cameron's Ghosts of the Abyss, as well as Cameron's film of the same name, the two-part A&E television specials Death of a Dream and The Legend Lives On, and the video game Titanic: Honor and Glory.
