= Titanic (1997 film) =

1997 film by James Cameron

- Theatrical release poster
- Directed by: James Cameron
- Written by: James Cameron
- Produced by: James Cameron; Jon Landau
- Starring: Leonardo DiCaprio; Kate Winslet; Billy Zane; Kathy Bates; Frances Fisher; Bernard Hill; Jonathan Hyde; Danny Nucci; David Warner; Bill Paxton
- Cinematography: Russell Carpenter
- Edited by: Conrad Buff; James Cameron; Richard A. Harris
- Music by: James Horner
- Production companies: Paramount Pictures; 20th Century Fox; Lightstorm Entertainment
- Distributed by: Paramount Pictures (United States and Canada); 20th Century Fox (International)
- Release dates: November 1, 1997 (Tokyo); December 19, 1997 (United States)
- Running time: 195 minutes
- Country: United States
- Language: English
- Budget: $200 million
- Box office: $2.264 billion

Titanic is a 1997 American historical romance film written and directed by James Cameron. Incorporating both historical and fictional aspects, it is based on accounts of the sinking of RMS Titanic in 1912. Leonardo DiCaprio and Kate Winslet star as members of different social classes who fall in love during the ship's ill-fated maiden voyage. The ensemble cast includes Billy Zane, Kathy Bates, Frances Fisher, Bernard Hill, Jonathan Hyde, Danny Nucci, David Warner and Bill Paxton.

Cameron's inspiration came from his fascination with shipwrecks. He felt a love story interspersed with human loss would be essential to convey the emotional impact of the disaster. Production began on September 1, 1995, when Cameron shot footage of the Titanic wreck. The modern scenes were shot on board the Shirshov Institute of Oceanology research vessel Akademik Mstislav Keldysh, which Cameron had used as a base when filming the wreck. Scale models, computer-generated imagery (CGI), and a reconstruction of the Titanic built at Baja Studios were used to recreate the sinking. Titanic was initially in development at 20th Century Fox, but delays and a mounting budget resulted in Fox partnering with Paramount Pictures for financial help. It was the most expensive film ever made at the time, with a production budget of $200 million. Filming took place from July 1996 to March 1997.

Titanic premiered at the Tokyo International Film Festival on November 1, 1997, and was released in the United States on December 19. It was distributed by Paramount Pictures in the United States and Canada and by 20th Century Fox in other territories. It was praised for its visual effects, performances (particularly those of DiCaprio, Winslet, and Gloria Stuart), production values, direction, score, cinematography, story, and emotional depth. Among other awards, the film received fourteen nominations at the 70th Academy Awards and won eleven, including Best Picture and Best Director. In doing so, it tied both All About Eve (1950) for the record for the most Academy Award nominations, and Ben-Hur (1959) for the most Academy Awards won by a film, making Titanic the most successful individual film in Academy Award history. (Note: These records would be matched by La La Land (2016) and The Lord of the Rings: The Return of the King (2003) respectively, although the nomination record was surpassed by Sinners (2025) in 2026).)

With an initial worldwide gross of over $1.84 billion, becoming the highest-grossing film of 1997, Titanic was the first film to reach the billion-dollar mark, (Note: Jurassic Park (1993) would later become the earliest-released film to achieve this feat, via subsequent re-releases) and was the highest-grossing film of all time until Cameron's next film, Avatar (2009), surpassed it in 2010. Income from the initial theatrical release, retail video, and soundtrack sales and US broadcast rights exceeded $3.2 billion. Re-releases pushed the worldwide theatrical total to $2.264 billion, making Titanic the second film to gross more than $2 billion worldwide after Avatar; as of 2026, it is the fifth-highest-grossing film. In 2017, the Library of Congress selected it for preservation in the United States National Film Registry as "culturally, historically, or aesthetically significant".

== Plot ==
In 1996, aboard the research vessel Akademik Mstislav Keldysh, treasure hunter Brock Lovett and his team explore the wreck of RMS Titanic, hoping to find a necklace known as the Heart of the Ocean. Instead, they recover a safe containing a drawing of a young woman wearing the necklace. The sketch is dated April 14, 1912, the day the Titanic struck an iceberg and sank, resulting in about 1,500 deaths. (Note: Although the Titanic hit the iceberg on April 14, it did not sink until the early hours of April 15.) After seeing a television report about the discovery, centenarian Rose Dawson Calvert contacts Lovett, revealing she is the woman in the drawing. Hoping she can help locate the necklace, Lovett brings Rose and her granddaughter aboard the Keldysh, where Rose recounts her experience on Titanic.

In 1912, 17-year-old Rose DeWitt Bukater boards the Titanic in Southampton with her wealthy fiancé, Cal Hockley, and her mother, Ruth. Rose is unhappy in the loveless engagement, but Ruth stresses that the marriage will resolve their financial problems. Rose contemplates suicide by jumping from the ship's stern, but is stopped by Jack Dawson, a poor nomadic artist. Jack and Rose form a friendship, and Jack confesses his feelings for her. Though initially resistant, Rose realizes she has fallen in love with Jack, despite Cal's and Ruth's disapproval.

Rose brings Jack to her stateroom and asks him to draw her nude, wearing only the necklace. Afterward, they evade Cal's valet, Spicer Lovejoy, and have sex in a car in the cargo hold. On the forward deck, they witness the ship's collision with an iceberg and overhear officers discussing the severity of the situation. When Cal discovers Jack's sketch of Rose, he has Lovejoy plant the necklace on Jack, framing him for theft. Jack is arrested and locked in the master-at-arms' office, and Cal pockets the necklace.

As Titanic sinks, women and children are prioritized for the lifeboats. Rose rescues Jack, and they return to the deck, where Cal urges Rose to board a lifeboat, claiming he and Jack will board another. Cal unwittingly wraps his coat, containing the necklace, around her. As her lifeboat is lowered, Rose jumps back onto the ship, unwilling to leave Jack behind. Enraged, Cal grabs a pistol and chases them through the flooding ship, but gives up when they escape. Cal joins a lifeboat by pretending to be a child's father.

As the flooded bow sinks, the stern rises into the air, and Jack and Rose cling to the railing. The ship splits in two, and the stern sinks into the freezing water with the remaining passengers. Jack helps Rose onto floating debris and makes her promise to survive and live a full life. Jack dies from hypothermia, but Rose is saved by a returning lifeboat and rescued by the RMS Carpathia. Rose hides from Cal and her mother and gives her name as Rose Dawson on her arrival in New York City.

In the present, Rose reveals that Cal committed suicide after losing his fortune in the 1929 stock market crash. She tells the Keldysh crew that Jack saved her in every possible way, and laments that her memories are all that she has left of him. Touched by her account, Lovett abandons his search for the necklace. Alone at night on the stern of the Keldysh, Rose, who has kept the necklace in her possession, drops it into the sea above the wreck. Later, as she lies in her bed, photographs on her dresser depict a life of freedom and adventure inspired by Jack. Aboard the pristine Titanic, a young Rose reunites with Jack at the Grand Staircase, applauded by the passengers and crew who died in the sinking.

== Cast ==
=== Fictional characters ===
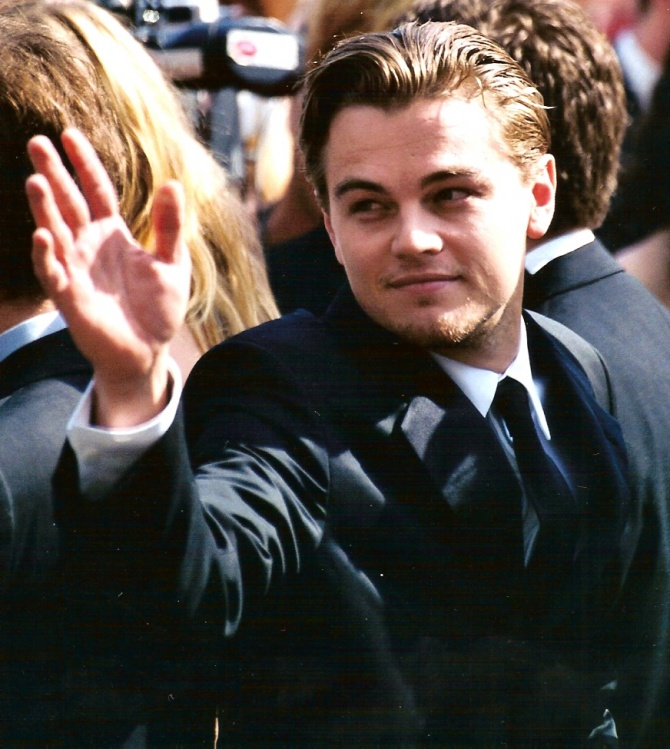
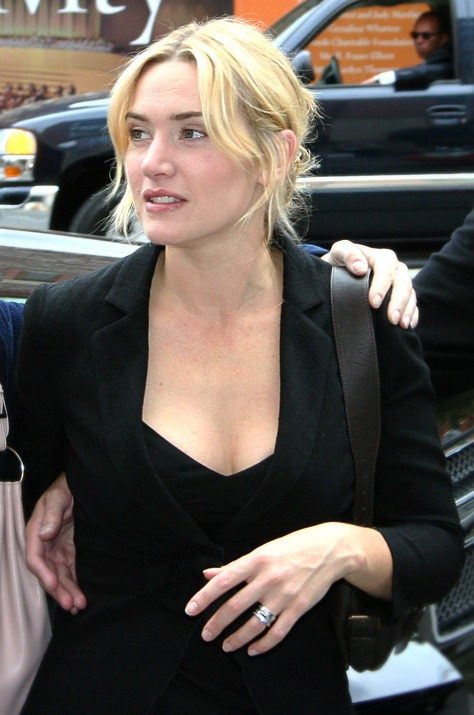
Leonardo DiCaprio (pictured in 2002), who portrayed Jack Dawson, and Kate Winslet (in 2006), who portrayed Rose DeWitt Bukater
- Leonardo DiCaprio as Jack Dawson, an itinerant, poor orphan from Chippewa Falls, Wisconsin, who has travelled the world, including Paris. He wins two third-class tickets for the Titanic in a poker game and travels with his friend Fabrizio. He is attracted to Rose at first sight. Her fiancé's invitation to dine with them the next evening enables Jack to mix with first-class passengers for a night. Cameron's original choice for the role was River Phoenix; however, he died in 1993. Although Jack was a fictional character, in Fairview Cemetery in Halifax, Nova Scotia, where 121 Titanic victims are buried, there is a grave labeled "J. Dawson". The producers did not know of the real J. Dawson until after the film was released.
- Kate Winslet as Rose DeWitt Bukater, a 17-year-old girl from Philadelphia, who is forced into an engagement to billionaire Cal Hockley so she and her mother, Ruth, can maintain their high-class status after her father's death left the family debt-ridden. Rose boards Titanic with Cal and Ruth as a first-class passenger and meets Jack.
- Gloria Stuart as the modern-day Rose Dawson Calvert. Rose narrates the film in a framing device. The elderly Rose was partly inspired by the American artist Beatrice Wood.
- Billy Zane as Caledon "Cal" Hockley, Rose's arrogant and snobbish 30-year-old fiancé, who is the heir to a Pittsburgh steel fortune. He is resentful of Rose's affection for Jack.
- Frances Fisher as Ruth DeWitt Bukater, Rose's widowed mother, who arranges Rose's engagement to Cal to maintain her family's high-society status. Like many aristocratic passengers portrayed in the film, her disposition is elitist and frivolous. She loves her daughter but believes that social position is more important than having a loving marriage. She strongly dislikes Jack, even though he saved her daughter's life.
- Bill Paxton as Brock Lovett, a treasure hunter looking for the Heart of the Ocean in the wreck of the Titanic in the present. Time and funding for his expedition are running out. He reflects at the conclusion that, despite thinking about Titanic for three years, he has never understood it until he hears Rose's story.
- Suzy Amis as Elizabeth "Lizzy" Calvert, Rose's granddaughter, who accompanies her when she visits Lovett on the ship and learns of her grandmother's romantic past with Jack Dawson.
- Danny Nucci as Fabrizio De Rossi, Jack's Italian best friend, who boards Titanic with him after Jack wins two tickets in a poker game. Fabrizio fails to board a lifeboat when the Titanic sinks and is killed when one of the ship's funnels breaks and crashes into the water, crushing him and several other passengers to death.
- David Warner as Spicer Lovejoy, an ex-Pinkerton constable and Cal's English valet and bodyguard. He monitors Rose and is suspicious about the circumstances surrounding Jack rescuing her. He dies when the Titanic splits in half, causing him to fall into a massive opening. Warner also appeared in the 1979 TV miniseries S.O.S. Titanic, portraying passenger Lawrence Beesley.
- Jason Barry as Tommy Ryan, an Irish third-class passenger who befriends Jack and Fabrizio. Tommy is killed when he is accidentally pushed forward and shot by a panicked First Officer Murdoch.
- Alexandrea Owens-Sarno as Cora Cartmell, a young third-class girl who dances with Jack at the Irish party. In a deleted scene, Cora and her family drown after they are trapped at the locked third-class gate.
- Camilla Overbye Roos as Helga Dahl, a Norwegian immigrant and third-class passenger who falls in love with Fabrizio. While most of her scenes were cut and the secondary significance of her character was drastically reduced from the original screenplay to the final theatrical cut, Helga is most notably seen clinging onto the rail of the ship's stern with Jack and Rose before slipping into the frigid waters below.
- Amy Gaipa as Trudy Bolt, Rose's personal maid.
- Lewis Abernathy as Lewis Bodine, a member of Brock's expedition.

=== Historical characters ===
Although not intended to be an entirely accurate depiction of events, the film includes portrayals of various historical figures:

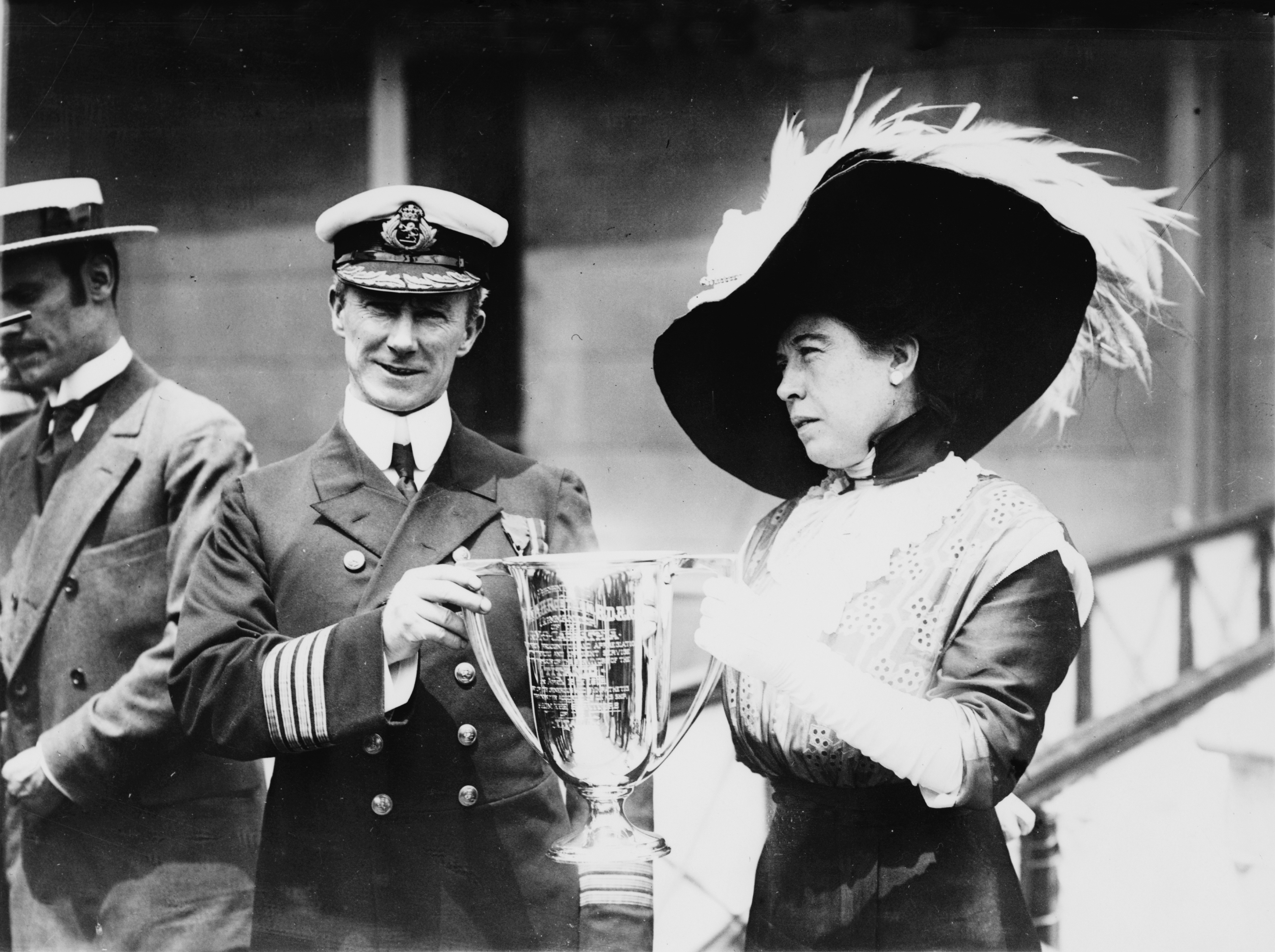
The real Margaret Brown (right) providing Captain Arthur Henry Rostron with an award for his service in the rescue of Titanic's surviving passengers

- Kathy Bates as Margaret "Molly" Brown. Brown is looked down upon by other first-class women, including Ruth, as "vulgar" and "new money". She is friendly to Jack and lends him a suit of evening clothes (bought for her son) when he is invited to dinner in the first-class dining saloon. She was dubbed the Unsinkable Molly Brown by historians because, with the support of other women, she commandeered Lifeboat 6 from Quartermaster Robert Hichens. Some aspects of this altercation are portrayed in Cameron's film.
- Victor Garber as Thomas Andrews, the ship's builder. Andrews is portrayed as a kind, decent man who is modest about his grand achievement. After the collision, he tries to convince the others, particularly Ismay, that it is a "mathematical certainty" that the ship will sink. He is depicted during the sinking of the ship as standing next to the clock in the first-class smoking room, lamenting his failure to build a strong and safe ship. Although this has become one of the most famous legends of the sinking of the Titanic, this story, which was published in a 1912 book (Thomas Andrews: Shipbuilder) and thereafter perpetuated, came from John Stewart, a steward on the ship who in fact left the ship in boat no.15 at approximately 1:40 a.m. There were testimonies of sightings of Andrews after that moment. It appears that Andrews stayed in the smoking room for some time to gather his thoughts; he then continued assisting with the evacuation.

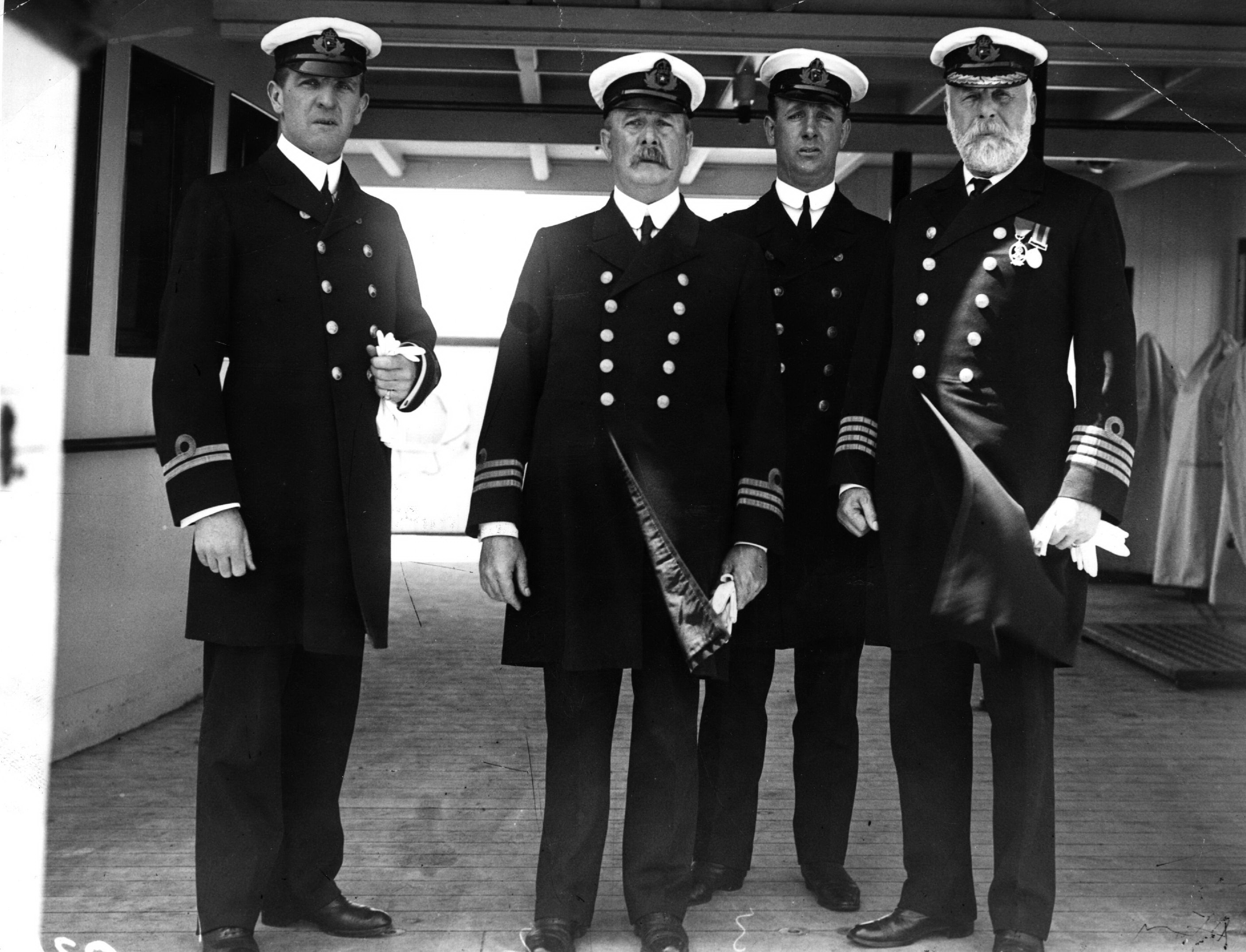
Crew of the Olympic, 1911. Left: First Officer William M. Murdoch. Right: Captain Edward J. Smith.

- Bernard Hill as Captain Edward John Smith. Smith planned to make the Titanic his final voyage before retiring. He retreats into the wheelhouse on the bridge as the ship sinks, dying when the windows burst from the water pressure whilst he clings to the ship's wheel. There are conflicting accounts as to whether he died in this manner or later froze to death in the water near the capsized collapsible lifeboat B.
- Jonathan Hyde as J. Bruce Ismay, White Star Line's ignorant, boorish managing director. With the prospect of an earlier arrival in New York and favorable press attention, Ismay influences Captain Smith to go faster; although this situation appears in popular portrayals of the disaster, it is unsupported by evidence. After the collision, he struggles to comprehend that his "unsinkable" ship is doomed. Ismay later boards Collapsible C (one of the last lifeboats to leave the ship) just before it is lowered. He was branded a coward by the press and public for surviving the disaster while many women and children drowned.
- Eric Braeden as John Jacob Astor IV, a first-class passenger and the richest man on the ship. Rose introduces Jack to Astor and his 18-year-old wife, Madeleine (Charlotte Chatton), in the first-class dining saloon. During the introduction, Astor asks whether Jack is connected to the "Boston Dawsons", a question Jack deflects by saying that he is instead affiliated with the Chippewa Falls Dawsons. Astor is last seen as the glass dome over the Grand Staircase implodes and water surges in.
- Bernard Fox as Colonel Archibald Gracie IV. The film depicts Gracie making a comment to Cal that "women and machinery don't mix" and congratulating Jack for saving Rose from falling off the ship, unaware that Jack saved Rose from a suicide attempt. He is later seen offering to lead Jack and Rose to the remaining lifeboats during the sinking. Fox portrayed Frederick Fleet in the 1958 film A Night to Remember.
- Michael Ensign as Benjamin Guggenheim, a mining magnate traveling in first class. He shows off his French mistress, Madame Aubert (Fannie Brett), to his fellow passengers while his wife and three daughters wait for him at home. When Jack joins the first-class passengers for dinner after rescuing Rose, Guggenheim refers to him as a "bohemian". Guggenheim is seen in the flooding Grand Staircase during the sinking, saying he is prepared to go down as a gentleman.

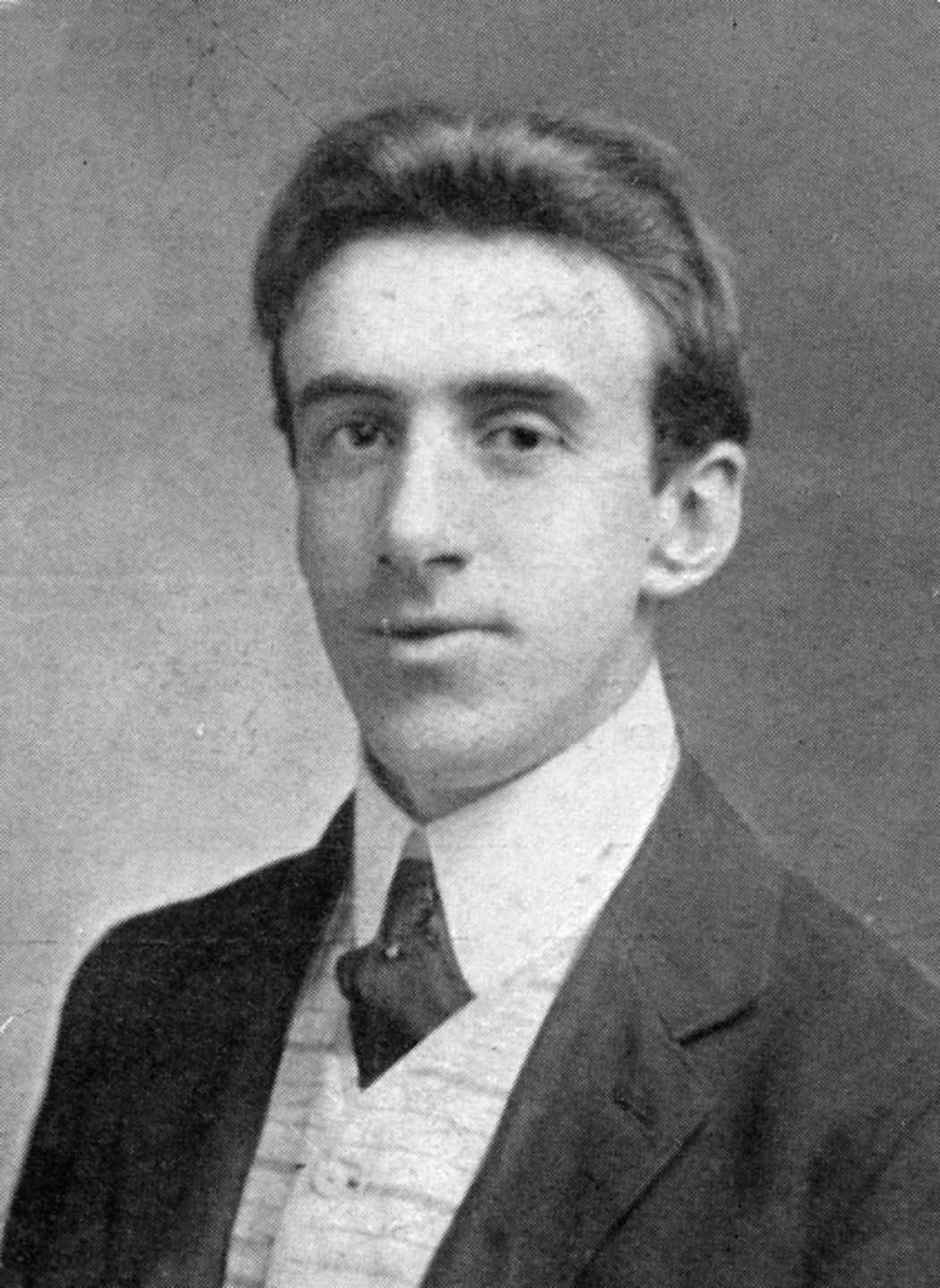
Wallace Hartley, Titanic's bandmaster and violinist

- Jonathan Evans-Jones as Wallace Hartley, the ship's bandmaster and violinist, who plays uplifting music with his colleagues on the boat deck as the ship sinks. As the final plunge begins, he leads the band in a final performance of "Nearer, My God, to Thee", to the tune of "Bethany", and dies in the sinking.
- Mark Lindsay Chapman as Chief Officer Henry Wilde, the ship's chief officer, who lets Cal board a lifeboat because he has a child in his arms. Before he dies, he tries to get boats to return to the sinking site to rescue passengers by blowing his whistle. After he freezes to death, Rose uses his whistle to attract the attention of Fifth Officer Lowe, leading to her rescue.
- Ewan Stewart as First Officer William Murdoch, the officer in charge of the bridge when the Titanic struck an iceberg. During a rush for the lifeboats, Murdoch shoots Tommy Ryan, as well as another passenger, in a momentary panic, and then commits suicide by shooting himself in the head. When Murdoch's nephew Scott saw the film, he objected to his uncle's portrayal, seeing it as damaging to Murdoch's heroic reputation. A few months later, Fox vice president Scott Neeson went to Dalbeattie, Scotland, where Murdoch lived, to deliver a personal apology, and also presented a £5000 donation to Dalbeattie High School to boost the school's William Murdoch Memorial Prize. Cameron apologized on the DVD commentary, but stated that there were officers who fired gunshots to enforce the "women and children first" policy. According to Cameron, his depiction of Murdoch is that of an "honorable man", not of a man "gone bad" or of a "cowardly murderer". He added, "I'm not sure you'd find that same sense of responsibility and total devotion to duty today. This guy had half of his lifeboats launched before his counterpart on the port side had even launched one. That says something about character and heroism."
- Jonathan Phillips as Second Officer Charles Lightoller. Lightoller took charge of the port side evacuation. In the film, Lightoller informs Captain Smith that it will be difficult to see icebergs without breaking water and, after the collision, suggests that the crew begin boarding women and children in the lifeboats. He is seen brandishing a gun and threatening to use it to keep order. He can be seen on top of Collapsible B when the first funnel collapses. Lightoller was the most senior officer to survive the disaster.
- Film producer Kevin De La Noy as Third Officer Herbert Pitman, who survived the sinking and manned Lifeboat 5.
- Simon Crane as Fourth Officer Joseph Boxhall, the officer in charge of firing flares and manning Lifeboat 2 during the sinking. He is shown on the bridge wings helping the seamen firing the flares.
- Ioan Gruffudd as Fifth Officer Harold Lowe, the only officer to lead a lifeboat to retrieve survivors of the sinking from the icy waters. The film depicts Lowe rescuing Rose.
- Edward Fletcher as Sixth Officer James Moody, the only junior officer to have died in the sinking. The film depicts Moody admitting Jack and Fabrizio onto the ship only moments before it departs from Southampton. Moody is later shown following Murdoch's orders to put the ship to full speed ahead, and informs Murdoch about the iceberg. He is last seen clinging to one of the davits on the starboard side after having unsuccessfully attempted to launch collapsible A.
- James Lancaster as Father Thomas Byles, a second-class passenger and a Catholic priest from England. He is portrayed praying and consoling passengers during the ship's final moments.
- Lew Palter and Elsa Raven as Isidor and Ida Straus. Isidor is a former owner of R.H. Macy and Company, a former congressman from New York, and a member of the New York and New Jersey Bridge Commission. During the sinking, the couple were offered seats on a lifeboat together. Isidor refused to go before all women and children had been evacuated, and urged his wife Ida to go ahead. Ida is portrayed refusing to board the lifeboat, saying that she will honor her wedding pledge by staying with Isidor. They are last seen lying on their bed, embracing each other as water fills their stateroom; the real Isidor and Ida Straus were also seen in an embrace, but were actually seated on chairs in the A Deck before being swept by waves as the ship made its final plunge.
- Martin Jarvis as Sir Cosmo Duff-Gordon, a Scottish baronet who is rescued in Emergency Boat No. 1. Boats 1 and 2 were emergency boats with a capacity of 40. Situated at the forward end of the boat deck, these were kept ready to launch in case of a person falling overboard. On the night of the disaster, Lifeboat 1 was the fourth to be launched, with 12 people aboard, including Duff-Gordon, his wife and her secretary. The baronet was much criticized for his conduct during the incident. It was suggested that he had boarded the emergency boat in violation of the "women and children first" policy, and that the boat had failed to return to rescue those struggling in the water. He offered five pounds to each of the lifeboat's crew, which those critical of his conduct viewed as a bribe. The Duff-Gordons at the time (and his wife's secretary in a letter written at the time and rediscovered in 2007) stated that there had been no women or children waiting to board in the vicinity of the launching of their boat; there is confirmation that lifeboat 1 of the Titanic was almost empty, and that First Officer Murdoch and Fifth Officer Lowe allowed Duff-Gordon and his wife and her secretary a place (simply to fill it) after they had asked if they could get on, alone with two other passengers. Duff-Gordon denied that his offer of money to the lifeboat crew represented a bribe. The British Board of Trade's inquiry into the disaster accepted Duff-Gordon's denial of bribing the crew, but maintained that, if the emergency boat had rowed towards the people who were in the water, it might very well have been able to rescue some of them.
- Rosalind Ayres as Lady Duff-Gordon, a world-famous fashion designer and Sir Cosmo's wife. She is rescued in Lifeboat 1 with her husband. They never lived down rumors that they had forbidden the lifeboat's crew to return to the wreck site in case they would be swamped. Jarvis and Ayres are husband and wife in real life.
- Rochelle Rose as Noël Leslie, Countess of Rothes. The Countess is shown to be friendly with Cal and the DeWitt Bukaters. Despite being of a higher status in society than Sir Cosmo and Lady Duff-Gordon, she is kind, and helps row the boat and even looks after the steerage passengers.
- Scott G. Anderson as Frederick Fleet, the lookout who saw the iceberg. Fleet escapes the sinking ship aboard Lifeboat 6.
- Paul Brightwell as Quartermaster Robert Hichens, one of the six quartermasters and at the ship's wheel at the time of collision. He is in charge of lifeboat 6. He refuses to go back and pick up survivors after the sinking.
- Martin East as Reginald Lee, the other lookout in the crow's nest. He survives the sinking.

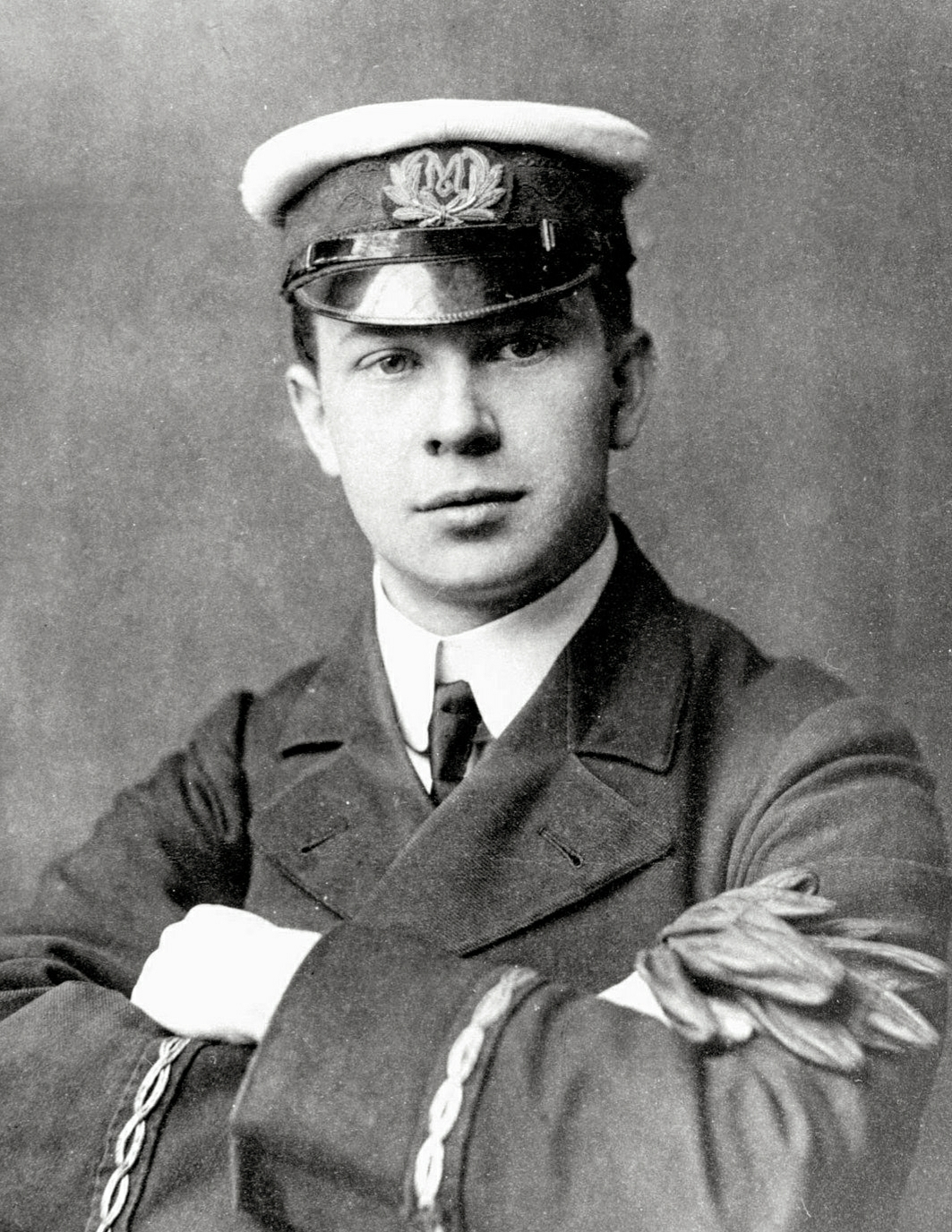
Jack Phillips, Titanic's chief wireless operator

- Gregory Cooke as Jack Phillips, the senior wireless operator whom Captain Smith ordered to send the distress signal upon learning of the ship's foundering.
- Craig Kelly as Harold Bride, Titanic's second wireless operator.
- Liam Tuohy as Chief Baker Charles Joughin. The baker appears helping Rose stand up after she falls, following her and Jack to the ship's stern, and finally hanging onto the ship's railing as it sinks, drinking brandy from a flask. According to the real Joughin's testimony, he rode the ship down and stepped into the water without getting his hair wet. He also admitted to hardly feeling the cold, attributing this to alcohol (though alcohol, in reality, worsens risk of hypothermia). In a deleted scene, he is shown throwing deckchairs overboard, before taking a drink from his bottle.
- Terry Forrestal as Chief Engineer Joseph G. Bell: Bell and his men worked throughout the sinking to keep the lights and the power on in order for distress signals to get out. The film portrays Bell and all of the engineers as having died in the bowels of the Titanic; however, there is evidence to suggest that at least some of the engineers were released to come on deck when the flooding became severe. Greaser Frederick Scott testified to seeing eight engineers between approximately 1:50 and 1:55 a.m. standing up against the electric crane on the starboard Boat Deck; by then, all the lifeboats had gone.
- Derek Lea as Frederick Barrett: Barrett was the leading stoker aboard the Titanic; he took overall charge of Lifeboat #13, which was nearly crushed by Lifeboat #15 as they were simultaneously lowered.

=== Cameos ===
Several crew members of the Akademik Mstislav Keldysh appear, including Anatoly Sagalevich, the creator and pilot of the Mir self-propelled Deep Submergence Vehicle. Van Ling portrayed real-life Chinese survivor Fang Lang; his backstory inspired Cameron to produce a documentary The Six, based on a group of Chinese survivors who survived the sinking. Anders Falk, who filmed a documentary about the film's sets for the Titanic Historical Society, makes a cameo as a Swedish immigrant whom Jack Dawson meets when he enters his cabin; Edward Kamuda and Karen Kamuda, then President and Vice President of the Society, who served as film consultants, were cast as extras.

== Production ==
=== Pre-production ===
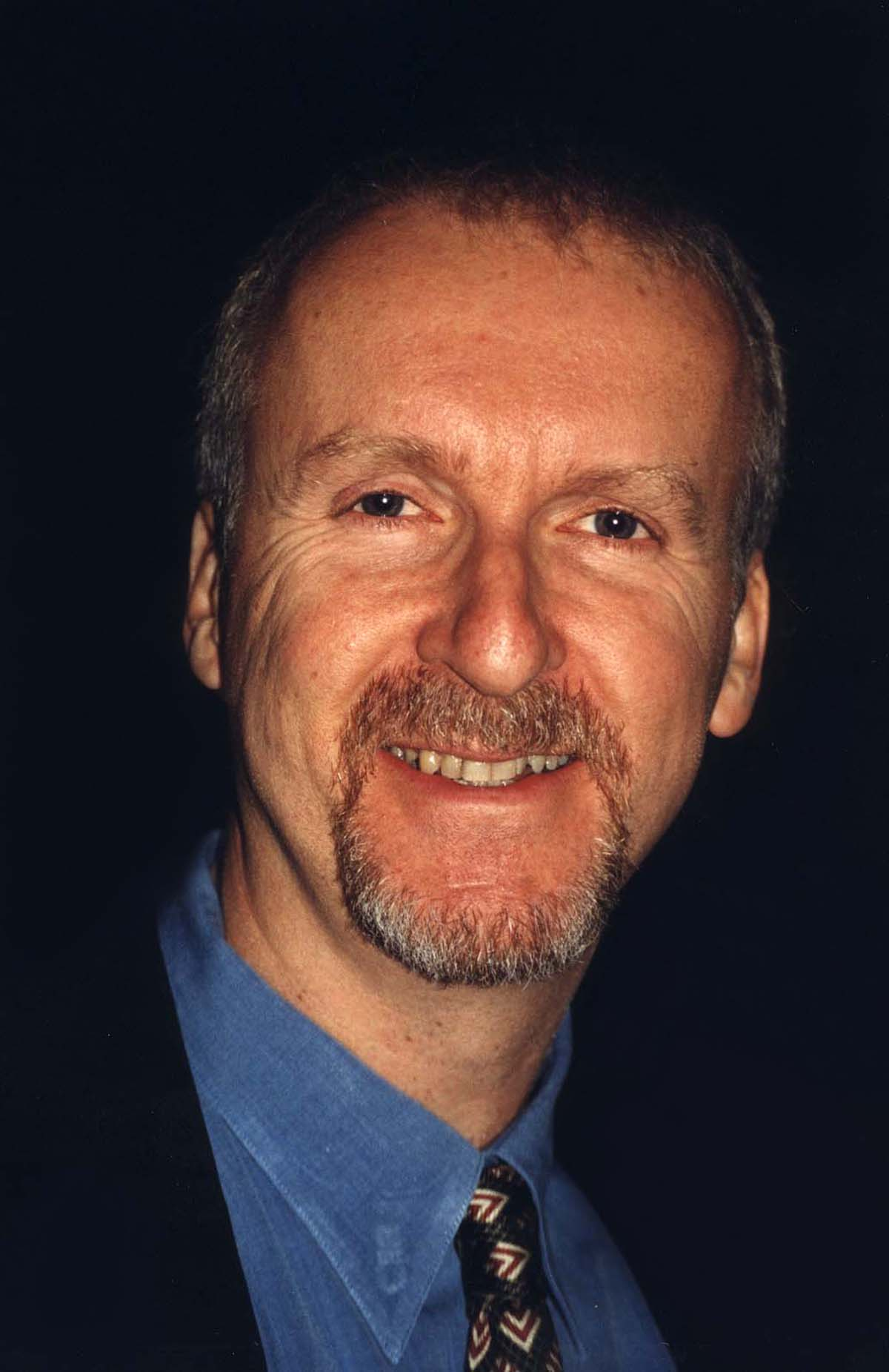
Director, writer and producer James Cameron (pictured in 2000)

The story could not have been written better had it been fiction ...The juxtaposition of rich and poor, the gender roles played out unto death (women first), the stoicism and nobility of a bygone age, the magnificence of the great ship matched in scale only by the folly of the men who drove her hell-bent through the darkness. And above all the lesson: that life is uncertain, the future unknowable ... the unthinkable possible.

— James Cameron

Cameron had long been fascinated by shipwrecks and felt Titanic was "the Mount Everest of shipwrecks". He was almost past the point in his life when he felt he could consider an undersea expedition, but was restless to explore the life he had turned away from when he switched from the sciences to the arts in college. After an IMAX film, Titanica (1992), was made from footage of the Titanic wreck, Cameron sought Hollywood funding for his own expedition. He said he was more motivated by a desire to see the shipwreck than to make a film.

Cameron wrote a scriptment for a Titanic film, met 20th Century Fox executives including Peter Chernin, and pitched it as "Romeo and Juliet on the Titanic". Cameron said the executives were unconvinced of the commercial potential, and had instead hoped for action scenes similar to his previous films. They approved the project as they hoped for a long-term relationship with Cameron.

Cameron convinced Fox to promote the film based on the publicity afforded by shooting the Titanic wreck, and organized several dives over two years. He also convinced Fox that shooting the real wreck, instead of simulating it with special effects, would provide value: "We can either do [the shots] with elaborate models and motion control shots and CG and all that, which will cost X amount of money – or we can spend X plus 30 per cent and actually go shoot it at the real wreck."

=== Undersea footage ===
The crew shot at the wreck, which lies in the Atlantic Ocean, 12 times in 1995. The work was risky, as the water pressure could kill the crew if there were even the tiniest flaw in the submersible structure. Additionally, adverse conditions prevented Cameron from getting footage. During one dive, one of the submersibles collided with Titanic's hull, damaging both and leaving fragments of the submersible's propeller shroud scattered around the superstructure. The external bulkhead of the captain's quarters collapsed, exposing the interior, and the area around the entrance to the Grand Staircase was damaged.

Descending to the site emphasized to the crew that the Titanic disaster was not simply a story of fiction, but a real event with real loss of life. Cameron said: "Working around the wreck for so much time, you get such a strong sense of the profound sadness and injustice of it, and the message of it." He felt a "great mantle of responsibility" to convey the emotional message of the story, as he was aware there might never be another filmmaker to visit the wreck.

=== Writing ===
After filming the underwater shots, Cameron began writing the screenplay. He wanted to honor the people who died, and spent six months researching the Titanic's crew and passengers. He created a detailed timeline of the events of the voyage and sinking and had it verified by historical experts. From the beginning of the shoot, the team had "a very clear picture" of what happened on the ship. Cameron said, "That set the bar higher in a way – it elevated the movie in a sense. We wanted this to be a definitive visualization of this moment in history as if you'd gone back in a time machine and shot it." Cameron was influenced by A Night to Remember, the 1958 British film about the Titanic which he had seen as a youth. He liberally copied some dialogue and scenes, including the lively party of the passengers in steerage, and the musicians playing on the deck during the sinking.

Cameron felt the Titanic sinking was "like a great novel that really happened", but that the event had become a mere morality tale; the film would give audiences the experience of living the history. The treasure hunter Brock Lovett represented those who never connected with the human element of the tragedy. He believed that the romance of Jack and Rose would be the most engaging element: when their love is finally destroyed, the audience would mourn the loss. He said: "All my films are love stories, but in Titanic I finally got the balance right. It's not a disaster film. It's a love story with a fastidious overlay of real history." Cameron created the character of the modern-day Rose, a survivor of the Titanic, to "see the present and the past" and "connects us in a way through history". He framed the romance with the elderly Rose to make the intervening years palpable and poignant. While Winslet and Stuart believed Rose dies at the end, Cameron said, "The answer has to be something you supply personally, individually."

=== Scale modeling ===
The reconstruction of Titanic. The blueprints were supplied by the original ship's builder and Cameron tried to make the ship as detailed and accurate as possible.

Harland & Wolff, Titanic's builders, opened their private archives to the crew, sharing blueprints that were previously thought lost. Fox acquired 40 acres (16 ha) of waterfront south of Playas de Rosarito in Mexico and began building a new studio on May 31, 1996. A horizon tank of 17 million US gallons (64 million litres) was built for the exterior of the reconstructed ship, providing 270 degrees of ocean view. The ship was built to full scale, but Lamont removed redundant sections on the superstructure and forward well deck for the ship to fit in the tank, with the remaining sections filled with digital models. The lifeboats and funnels were shrunk by ten percent. The boat deck and A-deck were working sets, but the rest of the ship was steel plating. Within was a 50-foot (15 m) lifting platform for the ship to tilt during the sinking sequences. The 60-foot (18 m) 1/8th scale model of the stern section was designed by the naval architect Jay Kantola using plans of the Titanic's sister ship RMS Olympic. Above the model was a 162-foot-tall (49 m) tower crane on 600 feet (180 m) of rail track, acting as a combined construction, lighting, and camera platform.

Production designers faithfully reconstructed the interior rooms of the Titanic based on authentic blueprints and period photographs. The central Grand Staircase, a prominent focal point, was built to a high standard of craftsmanship; however, it was structurally reinforced with steel framework and scaled 30% wider than the original vessel to enhance the visual grandeur and facilitate filming. Craftsmen from Mexico and Britain sculpted the ornate paneling and plasterwork based on Titanic's original designs. The carpeting, upholstery, pieces of furniture, light fixtures, chairs, cutlery and crockery with the White Star Line crest on each piece were among the objects recreated according to original designs. For the ship's interiors, production designer Peter Lamont's team looked for artifacts from the era. The newness of the ship meant every prop had to be made from scratch. Cameron hired two Titanic historians, Don Lynch and Ken Marschall, to authenticate the historical detail.

=== Casting ===
Cameron said he needed the cast to feel they were really on the Titanic, to relive its liveliness, and "to take that energy and give it to Jack ... an artist who is able to have his heart soar". Established actors including Chris O'Donnell and Stephen Dorff were considered, but Cameron felt they were too old for the part of a 20-year-old. Tom Cruise was interested, but his asking price was too high. Cameron considered Jared Leto, but he refused to audition. Billy Crudup was on the shortlist and was asked to audition, but he turned it down as he was not interested and chose to star in Without Limits (1998) instead. In 2000, Crudup said that the film would not be as successful if he had starred in it. Jeremy Sisto filmed a series of screen tests with Winslet and three other actresses vying for the role of Rose. Mark Wahlberg met Cameron to discuss the part but Cameron was not interested. Matthew McConaughey, Ethan Hawke, Christian Bale, and Paul Rudd also auditioned. McConaughey was disregarded because he refused to change his Southern drawl.

Leonardo DiCaprio, then 21 years old, was brought to Cameron's attention by the casting director, Mali Finn. Initially, DiCaprio did not want the role and refused to read his first romantic scene. Cameron said, "He read it once, then started goofing around, and I could never get him to focus on it again. But for one split second, a shaft of light came down from the heavens and lit up the forest." Cameron believed in DiCaprio's ability and told him, "Look, I'm not going to make this guy brooding and neurotic. I'm not going to give him a tic and a limp and all the things you want." Cameron envisioned the character as like those played by James Stewart or Gregory Peck. After she screen-tested with DiCaprio, Winslet was so impressed she whispered to Cameron, "He's great. Even if you don't pick me, pick him." DiCaprio turned down the lead role in Boogie Nights (1997) to star in Titanic. In 2025, he said he regretted this decision, saying Boogie Nights was "a profound movie of my generation".

Cameron described Rose as "an Audrey Hepburn type". As with DiCaprio, Finn brought Winslet to Cameron's attention. Gwyneth Paltrow, Winona Ryder, Claire Danes (who had worked with DiCaprio in Romeo + Juliet the previous year), Gabrielle Anwar, and Reese Witherspoon were considered for the role. (Note: Attributed to multiple references:) When they turned it down, with Paltrow choosing to star in Great Expectations (1998) instead and Danes feeling it was not right for her, Winslet campaigned for the role. She sent Cameron daily notes from England, which led Cameron to invite her to Hollywood for auditions. He was initially uncertain even after her screen test impressed him. Winslet sent Cameron a single rose with a card signed, "From Your Rose", and lobbied him by phone. "You don't understand!" she pleaded one day when she reached him by mobile phone in his Humvee. "I am Rose! I don't know why you're even seeing anyone else!" Her persistence and talent eventually convinced him to cast her. Cameron said Winslet "had the thing that you look for" and that there was "a quality in her face, in her eyes" that he "just knew people would be ready to go the distance with her". Winslet said of Rose: "She has got a lot to give, and she's got a very open heart. And she wants to explore and adventure the world, but she [feels] that's not going to happen."

At 87, Gloria Stuart had to be made up to look older for the role of the elderly Rose. Cameron instructed Finn to "find retired actresses from the Golden Age of the thirties and forties". Cameron did not know who Stuart was. Fay Wray was also considered, but Cameron said, "[Stuart] was just so into it, and so lucid, and had such a great spirit. And I saw the connection between her spirit and [Winslet's] spirit. I saw this joie de vivre in both of them, that I thought the audience would be able to make that cognitive leap that it's the same person."

Cameron considered Michael Biehn for the role of Cal Hockley, whom he had previously collaborated with on The Terminator, Aliens, and The Abyss, before offering it to Matthew McConaughey. Rob Lowe said he also pursued it. Reba McEntire turned down the role of Margaret Brown because it conflicted with her touring schedule.

=== Filming ===
Principal photography began on July 31, 1996, at Dartmouth, Nova Scotia. The modern-day expedition scenes were shot aboard the Akademik Mstislav Keldysh. In September, the production moved to the newly built Fox Baja Studios in Rosarito, Mexico, where a full-scale Titanic replica had been constructed. The poop deck was built on a hinge that could rise from zero to 90 degrees in a few seconds, just as the ship's stern rose during the sinking. For the safety of the stuntmen, many props were made of foam rubber. By November 15, the boarding scenes were being shot. Cameron built his Titanic on the starboard side as a study of weather data revealed it was a prevailing north-to-south wind, which blew the funnel smoke aft. This posed a problem for shooting the ship's departure from Southampton, as it was docked on its port side. Implementation of written directions, as well as props and costumes, had to be reversed; for example, if someone walked to their right in the script, they had to walk left during shooting. In post-production, the film was flipped to the correct direction. A full-time etiquette coach was hired to instruct the cast in the manners of the upper class gentility in 1912. Despite this, several critics noted anachronisms.

Cameron's sketch of Rose wearing the Heart of the Ocean. The scene was one of the first shot, as the main set was not ready.

Cameron sketched Jack's portrait of Rose; Winslet posed in a bathing suit. Cameron felt the scene had a backdrop of repression and freedom: "You know what it means for her, the freedom she must be feeling. It's kind of exhilarating for that reason," he said. The sketching scene was DiCaprio and Winslet's first scene together. Cameron said: "It wasn't by any kind of design, although I couldn't have designed it better. There's a nervousness and an energy and a hesitance in them. They had rehearsed together, but they hadn't shot anything together. If I'd had a choice, I probably would have preferred to put it deeper into the body of the shoot." Cameron said he and his crew "were just trying to find things to shoot" because the big set "wasn't ready for months, so we were scrambling around trying to fill in anything we could get to shoot." Cameron felt the final scene worked well.

The shoot was an arduous experience that "cemented Cameron's formidable reputation as 'the scariest man in Hollywood". He became known as an "uncompromising, hard-charging perfectionist" and a "300-decibel screamer, a modern-day Captain Bligh with a megaphone and walkie-talkie, swooping down into people's faces on a 162 ft crane." Winslet chipped a bone in her elbow during filming and worried that she would drown in the 17-million-gallon (64-million-litre) water tank in which the ship would sink. She said she was sometimes afraid of Cameron's temper and that he would shout angrily at crew members. Bill Paxton was familiar with Cameron's work ethic from his earlier experience, and said: "There were a lot of people on the set. Jim is not one of those guys who has the time to win hearts and minds." The crew felt Cameron had an evil alter ego and nicknamed him "Mij" (Jim spelled backwards). In response to the criticism, Cameron said, "Film-making is war. A great battle between business and aesthetics." More than 800 crew members worked on the film.

On August 9, 1996, during the Akademik Mstislav Keldysh shoot in Canada, an unknown person, suspected to be a crew member, put the dissociative drug PCP into the soup that Cameron and various others ate one night in Dartmouth, Nova Scotia. It sent more than 50 people to the hospital. Paxton and Cameron ate the soup and went to the hospital, however, Paxton decided to leave, telling Cameron, "Jim, I'm not gonna hang out here, this is bedlam. I'm gonna ... wander back down to the set and just drink a case of beer." The actor Lewis Abernathy said "there were people just rolling around, completely out of it. Some of them said they were seeing streaks and psychedelics." Cameron vomited before the drug took a full hold. Abernathy was shocked at the way he looked. "One eye was completely red, like the Terminator eye. A pupil, no iris, beet red. The other eye looked like he'd been sniffing glue since he was four." The Nova Scotia Department of Health confirmed that the soup had contained PCP on August 27, and the Halifax Regional Police Service announced a criminal investigation the next day. The investigation was closed in February 1999. Though Cameron suggest it might have been a fired crew member that was behind the poisoning, the person was never caught.

The filming schedule was intended to last 138 days but grew to 160 (filming officially wrapped on March 23, 1997). Many cast members came down with colds, flu, or kidney infections after spending hours in cold water, including Winslet. She decided she would not work with Cameron again unless she earned "a lot of money". Several others left the production, and three stuntmen broke their bones, but the Screen Actors Guild decided, following an investigation, that nothing was inherently unsafe about the set. DiCaprio said there was no point when he felt he was in danger during filming. Cameron believed in a passionate work ethic and never apologized for the way he ran his sets. He said:

I'm demanding, and I'm demanding on my crew. In terms of being kind of militaresque, I think there's an element of that in dealing with thousands of extras and big logistics and keeping people safe. I think you have to have a fairly strict methodology in dealing with a large number of people.

The filming costs reached $200 million, around $1 million per minute of screen time. Fox executives panicked and suggested an hour of cuts from the three-hour film. They argued the extended length would mean fewer showings, thus less revenue, even though long epics are more likely to win Oscars. Cameron refused, telling Fox, "You want to cut my movie? You're going to have to fire me! You want to fire me? You're going to have to kill me!" The executives did not want to start over, because it would mean the loss of their entire investment. They initially rejected Cameron's offer to forfeit his share of the profits as an empty gesture, as they predicted profits would be unlikely. Instead, they accepted his offer to give up his $8 million salary and his share of the initial gross profits. Cameron said: "The short version is that the film cost proportionally much more than T2 and True Lies. Those films went up seven or eight percent from the initial budget. Titanic also had a large budget to begin with, but it went up a lot more. As the producer and director, I take responsibility for the studio that's writing the checks, so I made it less painful for them. I did that on two different occasions. They didn't force me to do it; they were glad that I did." In July 2024, Cameron said that the co-producer Jon Landau "bore the brunt of the studio pressure" when Titanic was made. According to Cameron, Landau "gave his all to provide the time and resources for me to make the film I saw in my head".

Worried about the mounting costs, Fox wanted to find a partner studio to co-finance the film. Fox first approached Universal Pictures, as they had picked up the international distribution rights to Cameron's True Lies (1994) when production costs began to mount; however, Universal would turn Fox down. Instead, Fox and Paramount Pictures came together in May 1996 following the success both studios had collaborating on the distribution for Mel Gibson's Braveheart (1995), and they agreed to co-finance the film and split the distribution rights. In an effort to recoup their $135 million investment, Fox sold the domestic rights to Paramount in return for Paramount providing Fox an additional $65 million for production, while retaining international rights; Fox remained responsible for any further budget overruns, but they would retain all profits from any merchandise as part of the deal with Paramount. Amidst the film's successful box-office run, the Fox executive William Mechanic said: "Jim Cameron told us we could have an expensive bad movie or a more expensive potentially great movie. We made our judgment. And we made the best choice."

=== Post-production ===
==== Effects ====
Cameron wanted to push the boundary of special effects, and enlisted Digital Domain and Pacific Data Images to continue the developments in digital technology he pioneered on The Abyss and Terminator 2: Judgment Day. Many previous films about Titanic shot water in slow motion, which did not look wholly convincing. Cameron encouraged his crew to shoot their 45-foot-long (14 m) miniature of the ship as if "we're making a commercial for the White Star Line". Afterwards, digital water and smoke were added, as were extras captured on a motion capture stage. Visual effects supervisor Rob Legato scanned the faces of many actors, including himself and his children, for the digital extras and stuntmen. There was also a 65-foot-long (20 m) model of the ship's stern that could break in two repeatedly, the only miniature to be used in water. For scenes set in the ship's engines, footage of the SS Jeremiah O'Brien's engines were composited with miniature support frames, and actors shot against a greenscreen. To save money, the first-class lounge was a miniature set incorporated into a greenscreen backdrop behind the actors. The miniature of the lounge was crushed to simulate the destruction of the room and a scale model of a first-class corridor flooded with jets of water while the camera pans out.

Unlike previous films, Titanic showed the ship breaking in two before sinking. The scenes were an account of the most likely outcome.

An enclosed 5,000,000-US-gallon (19,000,000 L) tank was used for sinking interiors, in which the entire set could be tilted into the water. To sink the Grand Staircase, 90,000 US gallons (340,000 L) of water were dumped into the set as it was lowered into the tank. Unexpectedly, the waterfall ripped the staircase from its steel-reinforced foundations, although no one was hurt. The 744-foot-long (227 m) exterior of Titanic had its first half lowered into the tank, but as the heaviest part of the ship it acted as a shock absorber against the water; to get the set into the water, Cameron had much of the set emptied and smashed some of the promenade windows himself. After submerging the dining saloon, three days were spent shooting Lovett's ROV traversing the wreck in the present. The scenes in the freezing Atlantic were shot in a 350,000-US-gallon (1,300,000 L) tank. The frozen corpses were created by applying on actors a powder that crystallized when exposed to water, and wax was coated on hair and clothes.

The climactic scene, which features the breakup of the ship directly before it sinks and its plunge to the bottom of the Atlantic, involved a tilting full-sized set, 150 extras, and 100 stunt performers. Cameron criticized previous Titanic films for depicting the liner's final plunge as a graceful slide underwater. He "wanted to depict it as the terrifyingly chaotic event that it really was". The actors needed to fall off the increasingly tilting deck, plunging hundreds of feet below and bouncing off railings and propellers on the way down. A few attempts to film this sequence with stunt actors resulted in minor injuries, and Cameron halted the more dangerous stunts. The risks were eventually minimized "by using computer-generated people for the dangerous falls". A Linux-based operating system was used for the effects.

==== Editing ====
Cameron said there were aspects of the Titanic story that seemed important in pre- and post-production but became less important as the film evolved. He omitted the SS Californian, the ship that was close to the Titanic the night she sank but had turned off its radio for the night, did not hear her crew's SOS calls, and did not respond to their distress flares. A scene involving the Californian was cut, according to Cameron, "because it focuses you back onto that world. If Titanic is powerful as a metaphor, as a microcosm, for the end of the world in a sense, then that world must be self-contained." He said its omission was not "a compromise to mainstream filmmaking" but "about emphasis, creating an emotional truth to the film".

During the first assembly cut, Cameron altered the ending. In the original version, Brock and Lizzy see the elderly Rose at the stern of the boat and fear she is about to commit suicide. Rose reveals that she has possessed the Heart of the Ocean diamond all along but never sold it, to live on her own without Cal's money. She allows Brock to hold it but tells Brock that life is priceless and throws the diamond into the ocean. After accepting that treasure is worthless, Brock laughs at his stupidity. Cameron decided that the audience would no longer be interested in Lovett and cut the scene, so that Rose is alone when she drops the diamond. He also did not want to disrupt the audience's melancholy after the Titanic's sinking. Paxton agreed that his scene with Brock's epiphany and laugh was unnecessary, saying: "I would have shot heroin to make the scene work better ... Our job was done by then ... If you're smart and you take the ego and the narcissism out of it, you'll listen to the film, and the film will tell you what it needs and what it does not need."

The version used for the first test screening featured a fight between Jack and Lovejoy after Jack and Rose escape into the flooded dining saloon. The scene was written to add suspense, and had Cal offering to give Lovejoy, his valet, the Heart of the Ocean if he can get it from Jack and Rose. Lovejoy goes after the pair in the sinking first-class dining room. Jack attacks him and smashes his head against a window; this is why Lovejoy has a gash later. Cameron cut the scene for pacing reasons, and as test audiences found it unrealistic to risk one's life for wealth. Many other scenes were cut for pacing reasons.

==== Heart of the Ocean ====
For the Heart of the Ocean design, London-based jewelers Asprey & Garrard used cubic zirconias set in white gold to create an Edwardian-style necklace to be used as a prop. The studio designed and produced three variations, very similar but unique and distinguishable in character. The third went unused until after the film had been released. The three necklaces are commonly known as the original prop, the J. Peterman necklace and the Asprey necklace.

The third and final design was not used. After the film's success, Asprey & Garrard were commissioned to create an authentic Heart of the Ocean necklace using the original design. The result was a platinum-set, 171-carat (34.2 g) heart-shaped Ceylon sapphire surrounded by 103 diamonds. This design featured a much larger inverted pear-shaped Ceylon sapphire with a subtle cleft to resemble a heart. The chain for this necklace also featured a mix of round, pear, and marquise cut white diamonds. The bail also featured a heart cut white diamond with another round cut diamond attached to an inverted pear shape diamond which was then attached to the cage of the main stone. The necklace was donated to Sotheby's auction house in Beverly Hills for an auction benefiting the Diana, Princess of Wales Memorial Fund and Southern California's Aid For AIDS. It was sold to an unidentified Asprey client for $1.4 million (equivalent to $2.77 million in 2025), under the agreement that Dion would wear it two nights later at the 1998 Academy Awards ceremony.

== Soundtrack ==
Cameron wrote Titanic while listening to the work of the Irish new-age musician Enya. After Enya declined an invitation to compose for the film, Cameron chose James Horner. The two had parted ways after a tumultuous working experience on Aliens, but Titanic cemented a successful collaboration that lasted until Horner's death. For the vocals heard throughout the film, Horner chose the Norwegian singer Sissel Kyrkjebø, commonly known as "Sissel". Horner knew Sissel from her album Innerst i sjelen, and particularly liked how she sang "Eg veit i himmerik ei borg" ("I Know in Heaven There Is a Castle"). He tried around 30 singers before choosing Sissel.

Horner wrote the end theme, "My Heart Will Go On", in secret with Will Jennings, because Cameron did not want any songs in the film. Céline Dion agreed to record a demo at the persuasion of her husband René Angélil. Horner waited until Cameron was in an appropriate mood before presenting him with the song. After playing it several times, Cameron declared his approval, although worried that he would have been criticized for "going commercial at the end of the movie". Cameron also wanted to appease anxious studio executives and "saw that a hit song from his movie could only be a positive factor in guaranteeing its completion". The soundtrack was the best-selling album of 1998, with sales of over 27 million.

== Release ==
=== Theatrical ===
Distribution for Titanic was split between Paramount Pictures and 20th Century Fox; Paramount handling the domestic distribution, and Fox handling the foreign release. Both studios expected Cameron to complete it for release on July 2, 1997, "to exploit the lucrative summer season ticket sales when blockbuster films usually do better". In April, Cameron said the special effects were too complicated and that releasing the film on that date would not be possible. The studios considered pushing it to late July or the first week of August. Harrison Ford is reported to have informed Paramount, which had produced his lucrative Indiana Jones and Jack Ryan franchises, that he would never work with them again if they released Titanic so close to his film Air Force One, due on July 25.

On May 29, 1997, Paramount postponed Titanic to December 19, 1997. Its new release date would be shared by James Bond's Tomorrow Never Dies and Mouse Hunt. This led many to speculate that Titanic was poorly made. Studio executives wanted other summer blockbusters to maximize their profits, most notably Hercules, Face/Off, The Lost World: Jurassic Park, My Best Friend's Wedding, Speed 2: Cruise Control, Con Air, Batman & Robin, Men in Black, Air Force One, and Conspiracy Theory. To make up for Titanic's delay, Paramount moved up the opening of Event Horizon to August to position it as a desperately needed summer season release. A preview screening of Titanic in Minneapolis on July 14, 1997, was received positively, and favorable word of mouth spread online, creating more positive media coverage.

Cameron refused to hold the world premiere in Los Angeles. Paramount disagreed, but Fox acquiesced and held the premiere on November 1, 1997, at the Tokyo International Film Festival, where reaction was described as "tepid" by The New York Times. Positive reviews started to appear in the United States. The Hollywood premiere occurred on December 14, 1997, where "the big movie stars who attended the opening were enthusiastically gushing about the film to the world media". Titanic had a London premiere as a Royal Film Performance attended by Prince Charles.

=== Home media ===
Titanic was released worldwide in widescreen and pan and scan formats on VHS on September 1, 1998. There are two separate cassettes on this release, as the film is divided into two parts. More than $50 million was spent to market the home video release. Both VHS formats were also made available in a deluxe boxed gift set with a mounted filmstrip and six lithograph prints from the movie. In the first 3 months, the film sold 25 million copies in North America with a total sales value of $500 million, becoming the best selling live-action video, beating Independence Day. In that time, it sold 58 million copies worldwide, outselling The Lion King for a total worldwide revenue of $995 million. By March 2005, Titanic had sold 8 million DVD and 59 million VHS units. In the United Kingdom, it sold 1.1 million copies on its first day of release, making it the country's fastest-selling home video release. It held this record until May 2002, when Harry Potter and the Sorcerer's Stone sold 1.2 million home video units on its first day. Titanic remained the fastest-selling DVD in the United Kingdom until Mamma Mia! took it in 2008. Within the first week of release, Titanic quickly beat The Full Monty, selling a total of 1.8 million home video copies. NBC acquired the US television broadcast rights for $30 million, which was considered a bargain.

A DVD version was released on August 31, 1999, in a widescreen-only (non-anamorphic) single-disc edition with no special features other than a theatrical trailer. Cameron stated at the time that he intended to release a special edition with extra features later. This release became the best-selling DVD of 1999 and early 2000. Along with The Matrix, it became the first DVD ever to sell one million copies. At the time, less than 5% of all U.S. homes had a DVD player. "When we released the original Titanic DVD, the industry was much smaller, and bonus features were not the standard they are now," said Meagan Burrows, Paramount's president of domestic home entertainment, which made the DVD performance even more impressive.

Titanic was re-released to DVD on October 25, 2005, when a three-disc Special Collector's Edition was made available in the United States and Canada. This edition contained a newly restored transfer, a 6.1 DTS-ES Discrete surround sound mix and various special features. In PAL regions, two-disc and four-disc variants were released, marketed as the Special Edition and Deluxe Collector's Edition respectively. They were released in the United Kingdom on November 7, 2005. A limited 5-disc Deluxe Limited Edition was also only released in the United Kingdom with only 10,000 copies manufactured. The fifth disc contains Cameron's documentary Ghosts of the Abyss, which was distributed by Walt Disney Pictures. Unlike the individual release of Ghosts of the Abyss, which contained two discs, only the first disc was included in the set. In 2007, for the film's tenth anniversary, a 10th Anniversary Edition was released on DVD, which consists of the first two discs from the three-disc 2005 set containing the movie and the special features on those discs.

Titanic was released by Paramount Home Entertainment on Blu-ray and Blu-ray 3D on September 10, 2012. The 3D presentation is split over two discs and is also THX-certified. Special features on another disc included many of those featured on the 2005 Special Collector's Edition DVD along with two new documentaries titled "Reflections on Titanic" and "Titanic: The Final Word with James Cameron". The latter aired on National Geographic on April 9, 2012, and was executively produced by Cameron. A 4K release was released on December 5, 2023, on both digital and Ultra HD Blu-ray.

After being made available on the Amazon Prime Video streaming service in the U.S. in April 2023, Titanic became available on Netflix in July 2023; social media users noticed that the film's release on the streaming platform occurred shortly after the Titan submersible implosion, which occurred just the previous month. It became available on Paramount+ in October 2023 and returned to Prime Video for a period starting in April 2024 and April 2025. It was announced as coming to Hulu in February 2025. It was available on the free ad-supported streaming service Pluto TV in June 2023.

== Reception ==
=== Box office ===
Including revenue from the 2012, 2017 and 2023 reissues, Titanic earned $674.3 million in North America and $1.590 billion in other countries, for a worldwide total of $2.264 billion. It became the highest-grossing film of all time worldwide in 1998, beating Jurassic Park (1993). The film remained so for twelve years, until Avatar (2009), also written and directed by Cameron, surpassed it in 2010. It would hold the record for being Paramount's highest-grossing film domestically until it was dethroned by Top Gun: Maverick (2022) twenty-five years later. On March 1, 1998, it became the first film to earn more than $1 billion worldwide and on the weekend April 13–15, 2012—a century after the original vessel's foundering, Titanic became the second film to cross the $2 billion threshold during its 3D re-release. Box Office Mojo estimates that Titanic is the fifth-highest-grossing film of all time in North America when adjusting for ticket price inflation. The site also estimates that the film sold over 128 million tickets in the US in its initial theatrical run.

The 1998 North American box office set a record year for the film industry with a combined grand total of $7 billion from Titanic and numerous in-year releases including Armageddon, Saving Private Ryan, Godzilla, A Bug's Life, There's Something About Mary, The Waterboy, Deep Impact, Rush Hour, Dr. Dolittle, and Lethal Weapon 4.

Titanic was the first foreign-language film to succeed in India, which claims to have the largest movie-going audience in the world. A Hindustan Times report attributes this to its similarities and shared themes with most Bollywood films.

==== Initial theatrical run ====
Titanic received steady attendance after opening in North America on Friday, December 19, 1997. By the end of the weekend, theaters were beginning to sell out. The film earned $8,658,814 on its opening day and $28,638,131 over the opening weekend from 2,674 theaters, averaging to about $10,710 per venue, and ranking number one at the box office, ahead of Mouse Hunt, Scream 2, and Tomorrow Never Dies. It would go on to break The Godfather Part III's record for having the highest Christmas Day gross, generating a total of $9.2 million. For its second weekend, the film made $35.6 million, making it the biggest December weekend gross, replacing Scream 2. By New Year's Day, Titanic had made over $120 million, had increased in popularity and theaters continued to sell out. In just 44 days, it became the fastest film to approach the $300 million mark at the domestic box office, surpassing the former record held by Jurassic Park, which took 67 days to do so. Titanic would hold this record until 1999 when it was taken by Star Wars: Episode I – The Phantom Menace. Additionally, the film reached the $400 million mark within 66 days, which was the fastest at the time, a record matched by Spider-Man in 2002. Both films were surpassed in 2004 by Shrek 2.

Titanic's highest-grossing day was Saturday, February 14, 1998, on which it earned $13,048,711, more than eight weeks after its North American debut. On March 14, it surpassed Star Wars as the highest-grossing film ever in North America. It stayed at number one for 15 consecutive weeks in North America. This was a record for any film, beating both Tootsie and Beverly Hills Cop for having the highest number of consecutive weeks at the top of the box office. By April 1998, the film's number one spot was overtaken by Lost in Space. It stayed in theaters in North America for almost 10 months before finally closing on Thursday, October 1, 1998, with a final domestic gross of $600,788,188, equivalent to $1205 million in 2025. Outside North America, the film made double its North American gross, generating $1,242,413,080 and accumulating a grand total of $1,843,201,268 worldwide from its initial theatrical run.

==== Commercial analysis ====
Various film critics predicted Titanic would be a major commercial failure, especially since it was the most expensive film ever made at the time. When it was shown to the press in late 1997, "it was with massive forebodings", since the "people in charge of the screenings believed they were on the verge of losing their jobs – because of this great albatross of a picture on which, finally, two studios had to combine to share the great load of its making". Cameron also thought he was "headed for disaster" at one point during filming. "We labored the last six months on Titanic in the absolute knowledge that the studio would lose $100 million. It was a certainty." As the film neared release, "particular venom was spat at Cameron for what was seen as his hubris and monumental extravagance". A critic for the Los Angeles Times wrote that "Cameron's overweening pride has come close to capsizing this project" and that the film was "a hackneyed, completely derivative copy of old Hollywood romances".

It's hard to forget the director on the stage of the Shrine Auditorium in LA, exultant, pumping a golden Oscar statuette into the air and shouting: "I'm the king of the world!" As everyone knew, that was the most famous line in Titanic, exclaimed by Leonardo DiCaprio's character as he leaned into the wind on the prow of the doomed vessel. Cameron's incantation of the line was a giant "eff off", in front of a television audience approaching a billion, to all the naysayers, especially those sitting right in front of him.

— Christopher Goodwin of The Times on Cameron's response to Titanic's criticism

Titanic was playing on 3,200 screens ten weeks after it opened, and out of its fifteen straight weeks on top of the charts, jumped 43% in total sales in its ninth week of release. It earned over $20 million for each of its first 10 weekends, and after 14 weeks was still bringing in more than $1 million on weekdays. 20th Century Fox estimated that seven percent of American teenage girls had seen Titanic twice by its fifth week. Although young women who saw the film several times and subsequently caused "Leo-Mania" were often credited for taking it to its all-time box office record, other reports have attributed the success to positive word of mouth and repeat viewership due to the love story combined with the ground-breaking special effects. The Hollywood Reporter estimated that after a combined production and promotion cost of $487 million, Titanic turned a net profit of $1.4 billion, with a modern profit of as much as $4 billion after ancillary sources.

Titanic's impact on men has also been especially credited. It is considered one of the films that make men cry, with MSNBC's Ian Hodder stating that men admire Jack's sense of adventure and his ambitious behavior to win over Rose, which contributes to their emotional attachment to Jack. This was parodied in the 2009 film Zombieland, where character Tallahassee (Woody Harrelson), when recalling the death of his young son, states: "I haven't cried like that since Titanic."

Scott Meslow of The Atlantic stated while Titanic initially seems to need no defense, given its success, it is considered a film "for 15-year-old girls" by its main detractors. He argued that dismissing Titanic as fodder for teenage girls fails to consider the film's accomplishment: "that [this] grandiose, 3+ hour historical romantic drama is a film for everyone—including teenage boys." Meslow stated that though the film is ranked high by males under the age of 18, matching the ratings for teenage boy-targeted films like Iron Man, it is common for boys and men to deny liking Titanic. He acknowledged his own rejection of the film as a child while secretly loving it. "It's this collection of elements—the history, the romance, the action—that made (and continues to make) Titanic an irresistible proposition for audiences of all ages across the globe," he stated. "Titanic has flaws, but for all its legacy, it's better than its middlebrow reputation would have you believe. It's a great movie for 15-year-old girls, but that doesn't mean it's not a great movie for everyone else too."

Quotes in the film aided its popularity. Titanic's catchphrase "I'm the king of the world!" became one of the film industry's more popular quotations. According to Richard Harris, a psychology professor at Kansas State University, who studied why people like to cite films in social situations, using film quotations in everyday conversation is similar to telling a joke and a way to form solidarity with others. "People are doing it to feel good about themselves, to make others laugh, to make themselves laugh", he said.

Cameron explained the success as having significantly benefited from the experience of sharing. "When people have an experience that's very powerful in the movie theatre, they want to go share it. They want to grab their friend and bring them, so that they can enjoy it," he said. "They want to be the person to bring them the news that this is something worth having in their life. That's how Titanic worked." Media Awareness Network stated, "The normal repeat viewing rate for a blockbuster theatrical film is about 5%. The repeat rate for Titanic was over 20%." The box office receipts "were even more impressive" when factoring in "the film's 3-hour-and-14-minute length meant that it could only be shown three times a day compared to a normal movie's four showings". In response to this, "[m]any theatres started midnight showings and were rewarded with full houses until almost 3:30 am".

Titanic held the record for box office gross for 12 years. Cameron's follow-up film, Avatar, was considered the first film with a genuine chance at surpassing its worldwide gross, and did so in 2010. Various explanations for why Avatar was able to challenge Titanic were given. For one, "Two-thirds of Titanic's haul was earned overseas, and Avatar [tracked] similarly ... Avatar opened in 106 markets globally and was no. 1 in all of them" and the markets "such as Russia, where Titanic saw modest receipts in 1997 and 1998, are white-hot today" with "more screens and moviegoers" than ever before. Brandon Gray, president of Box Office Mojo, said that while Avatar may beat Titanic's revenue record, the film is unlikely to surpass Titanic in attendance. "Ticket prices were about $3 cheaper in the late 1990s." In December 2009, Cameron had stated, "I don't think it's realistic to try to topple Titanic off its perch. Some pretty good movies have come out in the last few years. Titanic just struck some kind of chord." In a January 2010 interview, he gave a different take on the matter once Avatar's performance was easier to predict, saying "It's gonna happen. It's just a matter of time".

Author Alexandra Keller, when analyzing Titanic's success, stated that scholars could agree that its popularity "appears dependent on contemporary culture, on perceptions of history, on patterns of consumerism and globalization, as well as on those elements experienced filmgoers conventionally expect of juggernaut film events in the 1990s – awesome screen spectacle, expansive action, and, more rarely seen, engaging characters and epic drama."

=== Critical response ===
==== Initial ====
Titanic garnered mostly positive reviews from film critics, and was positively reviewed by audiences and scholars, who commented on its cultural, historical, and political impacts. On the review aggregator website Rotten Tomatoes, it has an approval rating of 88% based on 255 reviews, with an average rating of 8.1/10. The site's critical consensus reads, "A mostly unqualified triumph for James Cameron, who offers a dizzying blend of spectacular visuals and old-fashioned melodrama." Metacritic, which assigned a weighted average score of 75 out of 100, based on 35 critics, reports the film has "generally favorable reviews". Audiences polled by CinemaScore gave it a rare "A+" grade, one of fewer than 60 films in the history of the service from 1982 to 2011 to earn the score.

With regard to the overall design, Roger Ebert stated: "It is flawlessly crafted, intelligently constructed, strongly acted, and spellbinding ... Movies like this are not merely difficult to make at all, but almost impossible to make well." He credited the "technical difficulties" with being "so daunting that it's a wonder when the filmmakers are also able to bring the drama and history into proportion" and "found [himself] convinced by both the story and the sad saga". He named it his ninth-best film of 1997. The television program Siskel & Ebert gave Titanic "two thumbs up" and praised its accuracy in recreating the ship's sinking; Ebert described it as "a glorious Hollywood epic" and "well worth the wait," and Gene Siskel found Leonardo DiCaprio "captivating".

James Berardinelli stated: "Meticulous in detail, yet vast in scope and intent, Titanic is the kind of epic motion picture event that has become a rarity. You don't just watch Titanic, you experience it." It was named his second best film of 1997. Joseph McBride of Boxoffice Magazine concluded: "To describe Titanic as the greatest disaster movie ever made is to sell it short. James Cameron's recreation of the 1912 sinking of the 'unsinkable' liner is one of the most magnificent pieces of serious popular entertainment ever to emanate from Hollywood." In a four out of five review, Jay Stone of Ottawa Citizen said, "The verdict: As big and glorious as the ship itself, unwieldy, unstoppable, packed with all the corny histrionics of the grand old Hollywood blockbusters and culminating in the most breathtaking maritime disaster since Waterworld."

The romantic and emotionally charged aspects were equally praised. Andrew L. Urban of Urban Cinefile said: "You will walk out of Titanic not talking about budget or running time, but of its enormous emotive power, big as the engines of the ship itself, determined as its giant propellers to gouge into your heart, and as lasting as the love story that propels it." Owen Gleiberman of Entertainment Weekly described the film as "a lush and terrifying spectacle of romantic doom. Writer-director James Cameron has restaged the defining catastrophe of the early 20th century on a human scale of such purified yearning and dread that he touches the deepest levels of popular moviemaking." Janet Maslin of The New York Times commented that "Cameron's magnificent Titanic is the first spectacle in decades that honestly invites comparison to Gone With the Wind." Adrian Turner of Radio Times awarded it four stars out of five, stating "Cameron's script wouldn't have sustained Clark Gable and Vivien Leigh for 80 minutes, but, somehow, he and his magical cast revive that old-style studio gloss for three riveting hours. Titanic is a sumptuous assault on the emotions, with a final hour that fully captures the horror and the freezing, paralysing fear of the moment. And there are single shots, such as an awesome albatross-like swoop past the steaming ship, when you sense Cameron hugging himself with the fun of it all."

Titanic suffered backlash in addition to its success. Some reviewers felt that while the visuals were spectacular, the story and dialogue were weak. Richard Corliss of Time magazine wrote a mostly negative review, criticizing the lack of interesting emotional elements. Kenneth Turan's review in the Los Angeles Times was particularly scathing. Dismissing the emotive elements, he stated, "What really brings on the tears is Cameron's insistence that writing this kind of movie is within his abilities. Not only is it not, it is not even close." He later argued that the only reason that the film won Oscars was because of its box office total. Barbara Shulgasser of The San Francisco Examiner gave Titanic one star out of four, citing a friend as saying, "The number of times in this unbelievably badly written script that the two [lead characters] refer to each other by name was an indication of just how dramatically the script lacked anything more interesting for the actors to say."

Of the seven surviving passengers who were still living at the time of the film's release, two are known to have watched it. Eleanor Ileen Johnson, who had met with Cameron during filming, watched the film a total of three times, including a special screening with critics Siskel and Ebert, said she cried on each occasion and found the experience "emotionally draining". In fact, she said she found the depiction of the tragedy "so realistic" that it was "difficult to watch". Michel Marcel Navratil, meanwhile, viewed the film later, in the privacy of his home. His daughter Élisabeth recalled that her father was moved by the film. He enjoyed seeing the ship race through the ocean and break the waves the way that he remembered seeing it as a child. Reacting to the scene of passengers freezing to death in the icy waters, he stated that he hoped his own father had not suffered for too long before dying.

==== Retrospective ====
According to Dalin Rowell of /Film, "With complaints about its lengthy runtime, observations that certain characters could have easily fit onto pieces of floating furniture, and jokes about its melodramatic nature, Titanic is no stranger to modern-day criticism." In 2002, filmmaker Robert Altman called it "the most dreadful piece of work I've ever seen in my entire life". Similarly, French New Wave director and former Cahiers du Cinéma editor Jacques Rivette referred to it as "garbage" in a 1998 interview with Frédéric Bonnaud and was particularly critical of Winslet's performance, who he said was "unwatchable, the most slovenly girl to appear on the screen in a long, long time." In 2003, Titanic topped a poll of "Best Film Endings", but it also topped a poll by Film 2003 as "the worst movie of all time".

In 1998, Cameron responded to the backlash, and Kenneth Turan's review in particular, by writing "Titanic is not a film that is sucking people in with flashy hype and spitting them out onto the street feeling let down and ripped off. They are returning again and again to repeat an experience that is taking a 3-hour and 14-minute chunk out of their lives, and dragging others with them, so they can share the emotion." Cameron emphasized that people from all ages (ranging from 8 to 80) and from all backgrounds were "celebrating their own essential humanity" by seeing it. He described the script as earnest and straightforward, and said it intentionally "incorporates universals of human experience and emotion that are timeless – and familiar because they reflect our basic emotional fabric" and that the film was able to succeed in this way by dealing with archetypes. He did not see it as pandering. "Turan mistakes archetype for cliché," he said. "I don't share his view that the best scripts are only the ones that explore the perimeter of human experience, or flashily pirouette their witty and cynical dialogue for our admiration."

In 1998, the Chinese president Jiang Zemin praised the film during an address to the National People's Congress in order to demonstrate his endorsement of Western cultural imports.

In 2000, Almar Haflidason of the BBC wrote that "the critical knives were out long before James Cameron's Titanic was complete. Spiralling costs that led to it becoming the most expensive motion picture of the 20th Century, and a cast without any big stars seemed to doom the film before release. But box office and audience appreciation proved Cameron right and many critics wrong." He added that "the sinking of the great ship is no secret, yet for many exceeded expectations in sheer scale and tragedy" and that "when you consider that [the film] tops a bum-numbing three-hour running time, then you have a truly impressive feat of entertainment achieved by Cameron". Empire eventually reinstated its original five-star rating, writing: "It should be no surprise then that it became fashionable to bash James Cameron's Titanic at approximately the same time it became clear that this was the planet's favourite film. Ever."

In his 2012 study of the lives of the passengers on the Titanic, historian Richard Davenport-Hines said, "Cameron's film diabolized rich Americans and educated English, anathematizing their emotional restraint, good tailoring, punctilious manners and grammatical training, while it made romantic heroes of the poor Irish and the unlettered." The British film magazine Empire reduced their rating from the maximum five stars and an enthusiastic review, to four stars with a less positive review in a later edition, to accommodate its readers' tastes, who wanted to disassociate themselves from the hype, and the reported activities of its fans, such as those attending multiple screenings. In addition to this, positive and negative parodies and other such spoofs abounded and circulated on the internet, often inspiring passionate responses from fans of various opinions. Benjamin Willcock of DVDActive.com did not understand the backlash or the passionate hatred. "What really irks me ...," he said, "are those who make nasty stabs at those who do love it." Willcock stated, "I obviously don't have anything against those who dislike Titanic, but those few who make you feel small and pathetic for doing so (and they do exist, trust me) are way beyond my understanding and sympathy."

In 2017, on the 20th anniversary of its release, Titanic was selected for preservation in the United States National Film Registry by the Library of Congress as being "culturally, historically, or aesthetically significant". The same year, Cameron reviewed the accuracy of the film for the National Geographic program Titanic: 20 Years Later with James Cameron.

The climax has sparked many debates about whether both Jack and Rose should have been able to fit on the floating door and survive, becoming among the most talked about aspects of the film. At the film's 20th anniversary, Cameron stated that it was "kind of silly, really, that we're having this discussion 20 years later". In 2023 he conducted a study for the film's 25th anniversary that aired as part of an updated National Geographic retrospective, which suggested it was possible but unlikely and depended on numerous variables, after a previous test had been conducted in 2012 by MythBusters.

Titanic was listed among the 100 best films in an Empire poll and in a later poll of members of the film industry. In 2021, Dalin Rowell of /Film ranked it the third-best film of Cameron's career, stating that it is "easily one of his best films, simply because it defied the odds", and considering it "a legitimately remarkable achievement — one that, despite its large budget, has a humble, earnest center. Even with all of the jokes the Internet loves to throw its way, Titanic demonstrates that Cameron is truly capable of everything he can imagine."

In 2024, Looper ranked it number 44 on its list of the "50 Best PG-13 Movies of All Time", writing:

Cameron's immersive visuals, achieved using groundbreaking special effects, transport viewers back in time to the opulence of the Titanic and the heart-wrenching chaos of its final hours. The sheer grandness of the film, combined with its tragic tale, pushed the boundaries of storytelling and visual effects, paving the way for future blockbusters.

In 2025, The Hollywood Reporter listed Titanic as having the best stunts of 1997.

== Accolades ==
At the Golden Globes, Titanic won Best Motion Picture – Drama, Best Director, Best Original Score, and Best Original Song. Winslet and Stuart were also nominated. At the 70th Academy Awards, Titanic garnered fourteen Academy Award nominations, tying the record set in 1950 by Joseph L. Mankiewicz's All About Eve and won eleven: Best Picture (the second film about the Titanic to win that award, after 1933's Cavalcade), Best Director, Best Art Direction, Best Cinematography, Best Visual Effects, Best Film Editing, Best Costume Design, Best Sound (Gary Rydstrom, Tom Johnson, Gary Summers, Mark Ulano), Best Sound Effects Editing, Best Original Dramatic Score, and Best Original Song. Winslet, Stuart and the make-up artists were nominated, but lost to Helen Hunt in As Good as It Gets, Kim Basinger in L.A. Confidential, and Men in Black respectively. Titanic was the second film to receive eleven Academy Awards, after Ben-Hur (1959). The Lord of the Rings: The Return of the King matched the record in 2004. In 2017, La La Land would tie the record for having the most Academy Award nominations. The number of nominations would be surpassed by Sinners in 2026.

Titanic won the 1997 Academy Award for Best Original Song, as well as four Grammy Awards for Record of the Year, Song of the Year, Best Song Written Specifically for a Motion Picture or Television, and Best Female Pop Vocal Performance. The soundtrack became the best-selling primarily orchestral soundtrack of all time, spending sixteen weeks at number-one in the United States, and was certified diamond for over eleven million copies sold in the United States alone. It was also the best-selling album of 1998 in the US. "My Heart Will Go On" won the Grammy Awards for Best Song Written Specifically for a Motion Picture or for Television.

Titanic also won various awards outside the United States, including the Awards of the Japanese Academy as the Best Foreign Film of the Year. It eventually won nearly ninety awards and had an additional forty-seven nominations from various award-giving bodies around the world. The book about the making of the film was at the top of The New York Times' bestseller list for several weeks, "the first time that such a tie-in book had achieved this status".

Titanic has appeared on the American Film Institute's award-winning 100 Years ... series six times.

AFI's 100 Years ... 100	Rank	Source	Notes
Thrills	25		A list of the top 100 thrilling films in American cinema, compiled in 2001.
Passions	37		A list of the top 100 love stories in American cinema, compiled in 2002.
Songs	14		A list of the top 100 songs in American cinema, compiled in 2004. Titanic ranked 14th for Céline Dion's "My Heart Will Go On".
Movie quotes	100		A list of the top 100 film quotations in American cinema, compiled in 2005. Titanic ranked 100th for Jack Dawson's yell of "I'm the king of the world!"
Movies	83		A 2007 (10th anniversary) edition of 1997's list of the 100 best films of the past century. Titanic was not eligible when the original list was released.
AFI's 10 Top 10	6		The 2008 poll consisted of the top ten films in ten different genres. Titanic ranked as the sixth-best epic film.

== Legacy and re-releases ==
=== 3D conversion ===
A 2012 3D re-release was created by re-mastering the original to 4K resolution and post-converting to stereoscopic 3D format. The Titanic 3D version took 60 weeks and $18 million to produce, including the 4K restoration. The 3D conversion was performed by Stereo D. Digital 2D and 2D IMAX versions were also struck from the new 4K master created in the process. The only scene entirely redone for the re-release was Rose's view of the night sky at sea on the morning of April 15, 1912. The scene was replaced with an accurate view of the night-sky star pattern, including the Milky Way, adjusted for the location in the North Atlantic Ocean in April 1912. The change was prompted by the astrophysicist Neil deGrasse Tyson, who had criticized the unrealistic star pattern. He agreed to send Cameron a corrected view of the sky, which was the basis of the new scene.

The 3D version of Titanic premiered at the Royal Albert Hall in London on March 27, 2012, with James Cameron and Kate Winslet in attendance, and entered general release on April 4, 2012, six days before the centenary of Titanic embarking on her maiden voyage.

Rolling Stone film critic Peter Travers rated the reissue 3 1/2 stars out of 4, explaining he found it "pretty damn dazzling". He said, "The 3D intensifies Titanic. You are there. Caught up like never before in an intimate epic that earns its place in the movie time capsule." Writing for Entertainment Weekly, Owen Gleiberman gave the film an A grade. He wrote, "For once, the visuals in a 3-D movie don't look darkened or distracting. They look sensationally crisp and alive." Richard Corliss of Time, who was very critical in 1997, remained in the same mood: "I had pretty much the same reaction: fitfully awed, mostly water-logged." In regards to the 3D effects, he noted the "careful conversion to 3D lends volume and impact to certain moments ... [but] in separating the foreground and background of each scene, the converters have carved the visual field into discrete, not organic, levels." Ann Hornaday for The Washington Post found herself asking "whether the film's twin values of humanism and spectacle are enhanced by Cameron's 3-D conversion, and the answer to that is: They aren't." She added that the "3-D conversion creates distance where there should be intimacy, not to mention odd moments in framing and composition."

The film grossed an estimated $4.7 million on the first day of its re-release in North America (including midnight preview showings) and went on to make $17.3 million over the weekend, finishing in third place behind The Hunger Games and American Reunion. Outside North America it earned $35.2 million, finishing second, and it improved on its performance the following weekend by topping the box office with $98.9 million. China has proven to be its most successful territory, where it earned $11.6 million on its opening day, going on to earn a record-breaking $67 million in its opening week and taking more money in the process than it did in the entirety of its original theatrical run.

The reissue earned $343.4 million worldwide, with $145 million coming from China and $57.8 million from Canada and the United States. With a worldwide box office of nearly $350 million, the 3D re-release of Titanic remains the highest grossing re-released film of all time, ahead of The Lion King, Star Wars, and Avatar.

The 3D conversion of the film was also released in the 4DX format in selected international territories, which allows the audience to experience the film's environment using motion, wind, fog, lighting, and scent-based special effects.

=== 20th anniversary ===
For the 20th anniversary of the film, Titanic was re-released in cinemas in Dolby Vision (in both 2D and 3D) for one week beginning December 1, 2017.

=== 25th anniversary ===
Titanic was re-released in theaters by Paramount domestically and Walt Disney Studios Motion Pictures (through the 20th Century Studios and Buena Vista International labels) internationally on February 10, 2023, in a remastered 3D 4K HDR render, with high frame rate, as part of the film's 25th anniversary. For this version, the international prints update 20th Century's logo with the studio's current name, as a result of Disney's 2019 acquisition of the studio.

=== Titanic Live ===
Titanic Live was a live performance of Horner's original score by a 130-piece orchestra, choir and Celtic musicians, accompanying a showing of the film. In April 2015, Titanic Live premiered at the Royal Albert Hall, London, where the 2012 3D re-release had premiered.

== Representation in other media ==
- In 1998, an official tie-in computer game was released, titled James Cameron's Titanic Explorer. The educational game covered the history of the vessel's construction, maiden voyage and sinking, as well as the discovery and exploration of the wreck. The game included deleted footage from the film and extensive 360-degree video footage of the film's sets.
- In 2020, a board game based on the film, titled Titanic: The Game, was released by Spin Master Games.
- Scenes from Titanic have been the basis for multiple Internet memes, including one called "It's been 84 years", which features a screenshot or GIF of a close-up of modern-day, elderly Rose and is used to "express impatience with the pace of things".
- In 2017, a parody jukebox musical based on the film called "Titanique" premiered in Los Angeles, written by Marla Mindelle, Tye Blue and Constantine Rousouli, and featured the songs of Celine Dion (who sang the film's theme song). The musical later transferred Off-Broadway in 2018 and later transferred to Broadway in 2026. A West End production opened in 2024.

== See also ==
- List of Academy Award records
- List of films by box office admissions
- List of films about the Titanic
