= Edith Haisman =

Titanic survivor (1896–1997)

- Haisman c. 1994
- Born: Edith Eileen Brown; 27 October 1896; Worcester, Cape Colony
- Died: 20 January 1997 (aged 100); Southampton, England, UK
- Known for: Centenarian and one of the oldest survivors of Titanic
- Spouse: Frederick Haisman (m. 1917; died 1977)
- Children: 10
- Parent(s): Thomas Brown; Elizabeth Ford

Edith Eileen Haisman (née Brown; 27 October 1896 – 20 January 1997) was a South African and British woman who was one of the last remaining and oldest survivors of the sinking of RMS Titanic in April 1912. She was the last survivor born in the nineteenth century and therefore the last survivor who was an adolescent at the time of the sinking, although seven younger child survivors outlived her.

== Early life ==
She was born on 27 October 1896 in Worcester, Cape Colony (now South Africa) to British immigrant Thomas William Solomon Brown and his native South African wife, Elizabeth Catherine (née Ford) who owned and operated a hotel in Worcester. She had one sister who died of diphtheria at eight years of age in 1906, as well as four half-siblings from her father's first marriage to whom she was not close. Thomas Brown saw the downturn in the South African economy, and he and his wife eventually decided they would emigrate to Seattle, where Elizabeth's sister Josephine Acton lived and where Thomas planned to open another hotel. They sailed aboard the Saxon to England, where Thomas booked tickets for his family aboard the RMS Titanic.

== Aboard the Titanic ==
Edith was 15 years old when she and her parents boarded Titanic in Southampton, England, as second-class passengers. The ship's hold contained tableware, furnishings, and 1,000 rolls of bed linen for the intended hotel.

Edith and her family became dining companions with Reverend Carter and his wife, Lillian. She and her mother enjoyed the ship's library while Thomas enjoyed the smoking room. Edith and Elizabeth later recalled meeting a woman in the library who was not at ease whatsoever about the voyage, despite sailing across the Atlantic Ocean before. Edith never learned the woman's name or what became of her. Additionally, they also encountered Captain Edward Smith, to whom Edith told that the Titanic was "the best ship we've ever been on!".

Edith remembered clearly when the ship struck the iceberg at 11:40 p.m. on 14 April 1912. In a series of interviews in her later years and a biography, A Lifetime on the Titanic, published in 1995, she gave a vivid account of its final moments, although some details have been called into question.

Father appeared a few minutes later. He told us, 'You'd better put on your life jackets and something warm, it's cold on deck. It's just a precaution. We've struck an iceberg, it's nothing much. The steward in the corridor says it's nothing to worry about.' We waited for ages on the boat deck for someone to tell us what to do. The ship's band was playing ragtime. They played to keep our spirits up. Everybody kept saying, 'She's unsinkable. She won't go down.' Father kissed us and saw us into Lifeboat 14. Up to fifty people got in as it swung perilously over the side. One man jumped into the boat dressed as a woman. As we rowed away from the ship, we could still hear the band playing, but now it was hymns. We were almost six hours in the lifeboat and during that time we had no water and nothing to eat. I kept wondering if my father had gotten off the ship, that's all I could think of. – 1995

Edith's and Elizabeth's feet were drenched in the lifeboat after a leak sprung up and began taking in water, eventually leaving them numb. Along with other passengers, they were transferred to another boat by Fifth Officer Harold Lowe, who returned to the wrecksite with Boat No. 14 with a small crew to assist him. Both of them were rescued by RMS Carpathia the next morning; however, they had difficulty walking and waited for the circulation to return to their feet. They rushed to the rail each time a new lifeboat was picked up, in hopes that Thomas had been saved.

Her father did not survive, and his body, if recovered, was never identified. Her last memory of him was that he was dressed in an Edwardian dinner jacket while smoking a cigar and sipping brandy on the deck, as she and her mother were being lowered in the lifeboat. Upon arrival in New York City, they stayed at the Junior League House before traveling to Seattle to live with her aunt, Josephine Acton. They soon returned to Cape Town, where she lived with relatives after her mother remarried, and moved to Rhodesia.

== Marriage and children ==
In May 1917, at the age of 20, Edith met Frederick Thankful Haisman, and they were married six weeks later, on 30 June. Their first child, a boy, was born in August 1918 and would be followed by nine more children. They lived in South Africa and Australia before settling in Southampton. Frederick died in 1977, shortly after he and Edith celebrated their diamond wedding anniversary at Rhinefield House in the New Forest. She was survived by six of her children (four sons and two daughters) and more than 30 grandchildren and great-grandchildren.

== Memorials ==
On 15 April 1995, Haisman, aged 98, was present with fellow survivor Eva Hart, aged 90, at the opening of a memorial garden at the National Maritime Museum in Greenwich, London, where a granite monument commemorating the 83rd anniversary of the sinking was erected.

In August 1996, at the age of 99, she joined fellow survivors Michel Marcel Navratil and Eleanor Johnson on a cruise to the location of the Titanic's wreck, where attempts were made to bring a large portion of its hull to the surface. Before leaving the site, she threw a rose into the ocean where her father had died 84 years earlier. There is also a road named after her in Freemantle, Southampton, England. In 1991, George Tullock of RMS Titanic Inc. presented her with her father's pocket watch, which had been retrieved from the sea bed. She had last seen it on 15 April 1912, when he waved goodbye to his wife and daughter as they left aboard lifeboat 14. They never saw him again, and he presumably went down with the ship. The watch was lent to Haisman "for life"; when she died five years later, it was reclaimed by RMS Titanic Inc.

== Death ==
Edith died on 20 January 1997 in a Southampton nursing home at the age of 100. By her bed stood a photograph of her father in a straw boater, stiff collar, and bow tie. She was one of the longest-lived Titanic survivors, with Mary Davies Wilburn holding the record, having died in 1987, at the age of 104.

== Portrayals ==
- Nicole Torrence (1998) – Titanic: Secrets Revealed (TV documentary)

== Bibliography ==
- Haisman, David (2009). Titanic - The Edith Brown Story. United Kingdom: AuthorHouse. ISBN 978-1-4389-6182-8.

Honorary titles
Preceded by Eva Hart	Oldest living survivor of the RMS Titanic; 14 February 1996 – 20 January 1997	Succeeded by Winnifred van Tongerloo
