= Titanica =

1992 Canadian documentary film by Stephen Low

- Directed by: Stephen Low
- Written by: Alexander Low
- Produced by: Pietro L. Serapiglia
- Starring: Eva Hart
- Narrated by: Cedric Smith; Leonard Nimoy
- Music by: Stephen Edwards
- Distributed by: IMAX
- Release dates: 1992; 1995; 1997 (edited)
- Running time: 95 minutes 40 minutes (edited general release version); 67 minutes (edited video version)
- Country: Canada
- Language: English

Titanica is a 1992 IMAX documentary film about the RMS Titanic. The film was directed by Stephen Low and narrated by Cedric Smith, Anatoly Sagalevich and Ralph White. The film mostly focuses on footage taken at the wreck of the RMS Titanic, also featuring footage of the expedition crew searching the wreck as well as interviews with Titanic survivors Frank John William Goldsmith and Eva Hart. Using Eva and the crew members, Low conveys the voice of the documentary by showing the Titanic's wreckage as a graveyard which is to be respected and treated with caution and care. It was the second feature-length IMAX film released, following Stones at the Max in 1991. An edited 40 minute version of the film was also later released for IMAX theatres in 1995; this version had new narration by Leonard Nimoy, though it retains most of White's narration. This edited version later became the basis for another edited version released in 1997, featuring 27 more minutes of interviews with Ralph White, Emory Kristof, and other experts.

== Production ==
The expedition crew was composed of a Russian, American and Canadian who were operating off the Russian research ship Akademik Mstislav Keldysh. Footage of the wreck was obtained by two Mir submersibles, sometimes working together, that had been equipped with IMAX cameras and lights that consumed 150,000 watts, capable of clearly lighting up the ocean floor. Footage of the wreckage is often compared with historical photos, showing the full impact of the tragedy.

In the film, Eva Hart comments that prior to the Titanic striking the iceberg, her mother had commented that calling the ship 'unsinkable' was "flying in the face of the Almighty."

== Reception ==
The film holds a 60% approval rating on Rotten Tomatoes based on 5 reviews. Roger Ebert gave the film 3½ stars out of 4, stating the footage "achieve[d] a remarkable intimacy" with the Titanic's wreck, though also stating he would have liked to see more footage of the Titanic and less of the expedition crew. Margaret McGurk from The Cincinnati Enquirer gave a positive review in 2000, particularly praising the detail and size of the footage, stating it was "an instance when the oversized Imax film format truly lives up to its potential." Edward Johnson-Ott from NUVO spoke favourably of both the footage of the wreck and the crew, stating the crew added "welcome humor while maintaining the dignity such an excursion demands."

Eva Hart, who had expressed concern about looting of the Titanic's wreck, commended the IMAX film, stating "The IMAX Titanic expedition weren't going down to plunder it. I think it's splendid."

Watching Titanica gave James Cameron the idea for incorporating Mir submersibles in his 1997 film Titanic. He contacted the same submersible crew that worked on Titanica after viewing the documentary and they agreed be part of his upcoming film.
