= Arktika 2007 =

Russian expedition involving a crewed descent to the ocean bottom at the North Pole

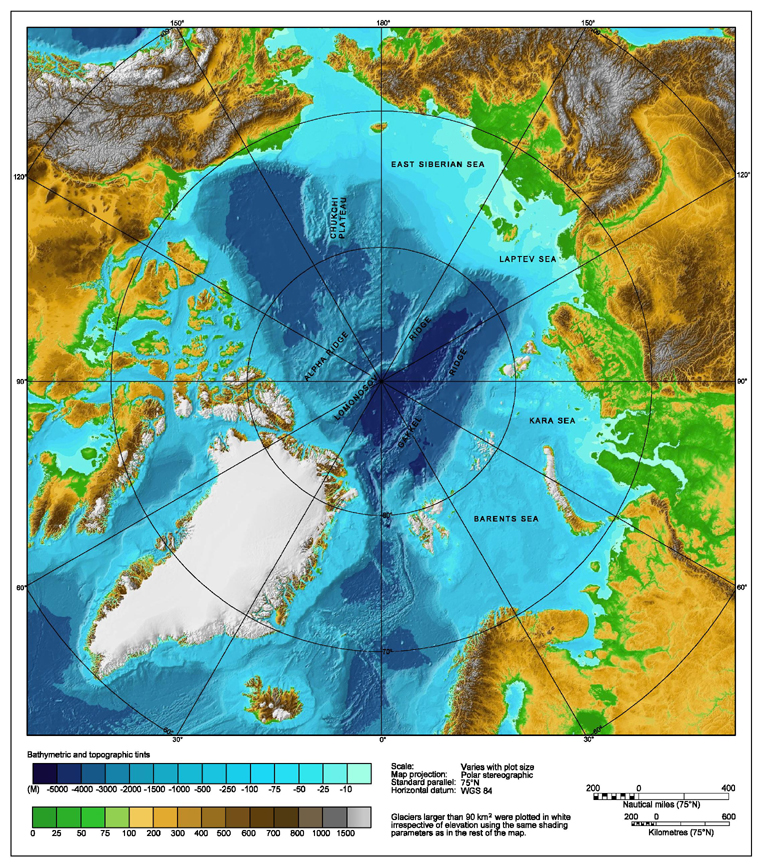
Arctic topography

Arktika 2007 (Russian: Российская полярная экспедиция "Арктика-2007") was a 2007 expedition in which Russia performed the first ever crewed descent to the ocean bottom at the North Pole, as part of research related to the 2001 Russian territorial claim, one of many territorial claims in the Arctic, made possible, in part, because of Arctic shrinkage. As well as dropping a titanium tube containing the Russian flag, the submersibles collected specimens of Arctic flora and fauna and apparently recorded video of the dives. The "North Pole-35" (abbreviated as "NP-35") manned drifting ice station was established.

On January 10, 2008, three expedition members who performed the descent to the ocean bottom at the North Pole, (Anatoly Sagalevich, Yevgeny Chernyaev, and Artur Chilingarov) were awarded the title Hero of the Russian Federation "for courage and heroism showed in extremal conditions and successful completion of High-Latitude Arctic Deep-Water Expedition."

== Program ==
The expedition, part of the Russian program for the 2007–2008 International Polar Year, used the Akademik Fedorov research ship, with both MIR submersibles on board and the nuclear-powered icebreaker Rossiya led it through the Arctic ice. The ships had two Mi-8 helicopters and geological probe devices, and Il-18 aircraft with gravimetric devices. Its aim was to investigate the structure and evolution of the Earth's crust in the Arctic regions neighbouring Eurasia, such as the regions of Mendeleev Ridge, Alpha Ridge and Lomonosov Ridge, to discover whether they are linked with the Siberian shelf.

== Expedition ==
The base ship Akademik Fedorov left Saint Petersburg on July 10, 2007, for the expedition. Off Baltiysk, it took aboard the two MIR Deep Submergence Vehicles manufactured by the Finnish company Rauma Oceanics from Akademik Mstislav Keldysh On July 22 the vessel arrived at Murmansk, and sailed for the North Pole three days later, behind the nuclear icebreaker Rossiya. After five hours, the Akademik Fedorov began drifting in the Barents Sea because the electric motor driving its propeller failed. The Rossiya, 20 hours ahead by that time, turned to help. Nine hours later the crew of Akademik Fedorov repaired the motor and the ship continued its voyage, staying close to the Rossiya. On July 27 The icebreaker landed a group of marine biologists on the Kheysa island, the site of Russia's Krenkel observatory to conduct research for the International Polar Year.

=== First stage: high-latitude deep-water Arctic expedition ===
==== Test descent ====
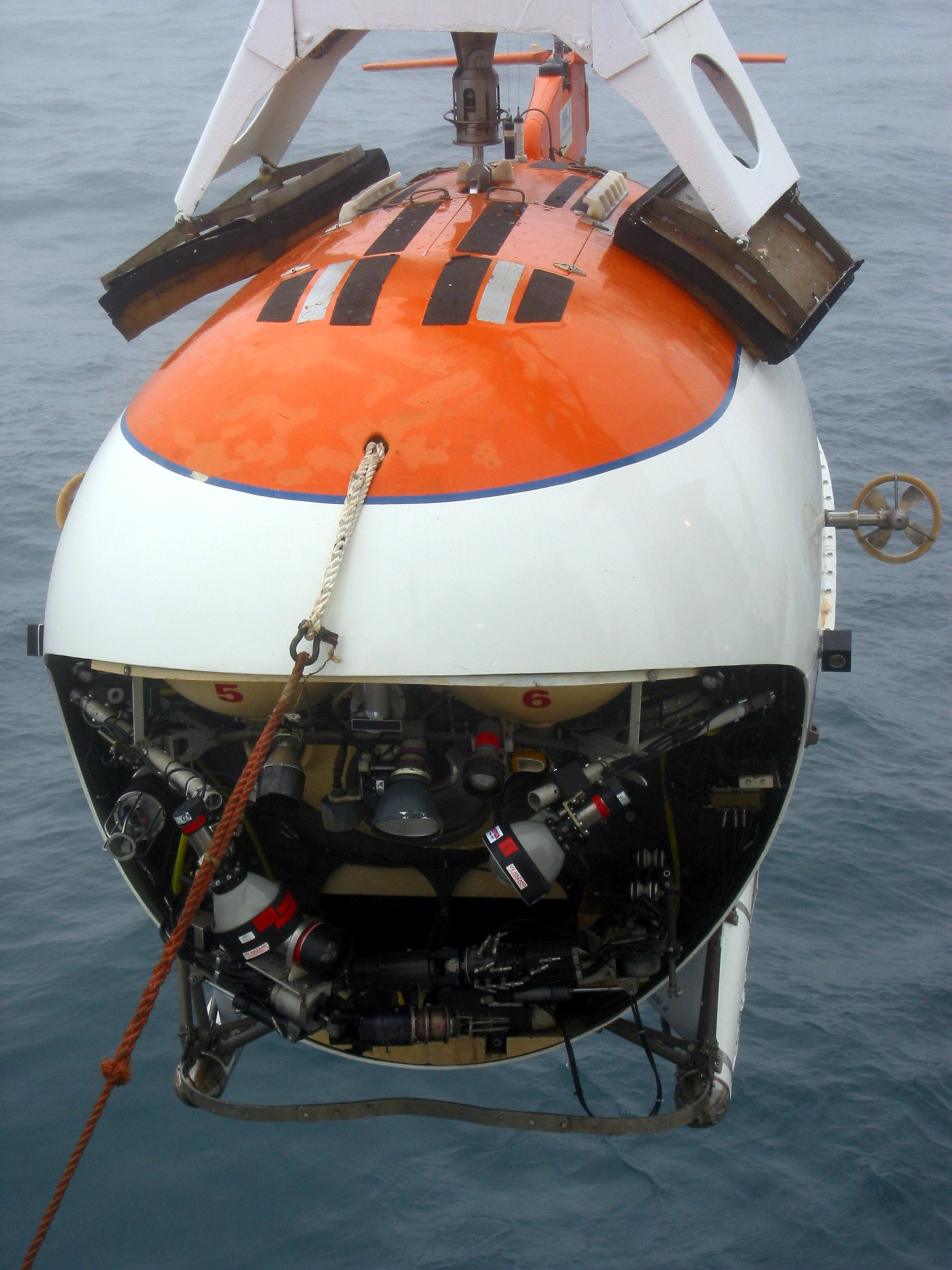
MIR submersible.

On July 29 the Akademik Fedorov approached a large ice-hole, surrounded by thick ice at 82°29′N 64°28′E, 47 miles (76 km) north of Franz Josef Land. There, the submersibles, each with one person on board, performed test dives. Anatoly Sagalevich took the MIR-1 down at 9:36 Moscow Time and Yevgeny Chernyaev followed at the controls of MIR-2 at 10:00. At 10:32 MIR-1 reached the seabed at a depth of 1,311 metres (4,301 ft), and by 11:10 MIR-2 also was at the ocean bottom. Both surfaced at 14:20.

==== North Pole descent ====
Descents were carried out on August 2, 2007, in both MIR Deep Submergence Vehicles. The MIR-1's crew consisted of pilot Anatoly Sagalevich (researcher of the Oceanology Institute), Russian polar explorer Arthur Chilingarov and businessman Vladimir Gruzdev. The MIR-2's crew comprised pilot Yevgeny Chernyaev of Russia, Australian adventurer Mike McDowell, and Swede Frederik Paulsen Jr., head of Ferring Pharmaceuticals).

MIR-1 began its dive at 9:28 Moscow Time and at 12:08 reached the seabed 4,261 metres (13,980 ft) below the North Pole. MIR-2 began its dive at 9:47 and at 12:35 reached the seabed 4,302 metres (14,114 ft) down. At 12:35 the bathyscaphes were 500 metres (1,600 ft) apart and MIR-1 moved near MIR-2. At 13:46 both submersibles began to ascend, with MIR-1 surfacing at 18:08 and MIR-2 at 19:15.

On the seabed, 4,261 metres (13,980 ft) below the Polar ice, MIR-1 planted a 1-metre (3 ft 3 in) tall titanium Russian flag, made at Kaliningrad's "Fakel" 'design bureau.' It also left a time capsule, containing a message for future generations and a flag of the pro-President Vladimir Putin United Russia party. Soil and water samples of the seabed were taken during the mission.

According to the USS Nautilus measurements, the sea depth at the North Pole in 1958 was only 4,087 metres (13,409 ft)

==== Controversy over TV images ====
Russian state broadcaster Rossiya had enhanced footage of the Arktika expedition with sequences taken by MIR submersibles for the 1997 film Titanic, as an illustration of the submarines in action, in which the Finnish-built bathyscaphes had explored the wrecked liner on the Atlantic seabed. The same images were rebroadcast by Reuters, which mistook them as actual footage of part of the expedition.

It was later recognized, that the submersibles used in the voyage to the bottom of the sea as appearing in sequences director James Cameron's Oscar-winning drama. International news agency Reuters had on August 10 admitted it had wrongly captioned video it took from Russia's Rossiya Television and which it had disseminated worldwide, London's Guardian reported. The agency, the daily reported, had admitted: it had “mistakenly identified this file footage as originating from the Arctic, and not the North Atlantic where the footage was shot. This footage was taken during the search for the Titanic and copyright is held by Rossiya."

==== Finish of the first stage ====
On its way back to Franz Josef Land to collect marine biologists, the Akademik Fedorov on August 4 met the French Tara expedition. The ship's MI-8 helicopter landed near the yacht, which had been drifting for eleven months, Rossiya's Vesti reported. The Russian expedition, led by Arthur Chilingarov, had supplied the Tara expedition with food Tara's schooner Agnès B had set out a year earlier to drift with the Arctic ice for two years, measuring the retreat of the Polar ice cap, its log shows. The Russians had asked to 'visit ... on their return from the Pole, we accepted their request', the log reads' 'A group of a dozen officials and journalists' brought 'gifts of fresh fruit and vegetables and a few bottles of wine ... we found the meeting somewhat surreal'. The French expedition had 9 tonnes (8.9 long tons; 9.9 short tons) of food and was growing its own — ‘...salad...is what we have grown...most [to date]. Corn salad grows very well’, even at those latitudes [but] ‘...it seems a bit premature to consider [us] a self sufficient Arctic base food wise', the Agnès B's Bruno Vienne told hydroponics advisers Les Jardins Suspendus

The first stage of the Arktika 2007 expedition ended on August 7, 2007, when both MIR submersibles were transferred from Akademik Fedorov aboard Akademik Mstislav Keldysh, met in Nagurskaya Bay, which is situated in the Cambridge Channel of Franz Josef Land.

=== Second stage: sailing eastwards ===
Akademik Fedorov then sailed towards the "Ice Base", a group of nine polar explorers led by A.A.Visnevsky landed on June 7, 2007, from the nuclear icebreaker Rossiya at the point 80°57′N 168°53′E The corresponding ice floe was a candidate for the "NP-35" establishment, but since then its area greatly reduced and became inappropriate for this. Sailing through the northern part of the Kara Sea Akademik Fedorov reached the northern part of Laptev Sea, then returned, passed by Schmidt Island and sailed southwards towards Shokalsky Strait of Severnaya Zemlya. 26 oceanographic stations were carried out and Mi-8 flights were performed from the research vessel to Schmidt Island for ornithology research and to north-eastern islands of Franz Joseph Land for glaciology, geology and ornithology research. Ornithology research was also conducted on Severnaya Zemlya islands. In particular, a significant part of the ivory gull range was observed and six new colonies of these birds found.

By August 17 Akademik Fedorov passed Shokalsky Strait and six days later collected the "Ice Base". On August 28 the research vessel anchored by the Tiksi roadstead to perform the rotation of expedition members and left for New Siberian Islands next day. Akademik Fedorov skirted them around from the north, carrying out oceanographic stations and a Mi-8 flight to Bennett Island was performed for geology probe and pollution probe.

On September 5 Akademik Fedorov met nuclear icebreaker Rossiya and started a search for an ice floe suitable for "NP-35" manned drifting ice station establishment, beginning the third stage of "Arktika 2007" expedition.

=== Third stage: drifting ice station "NP-35" establishment ===
The search for appropriate ice floe for the establishment of the "North Pole-35" (abbreviated as "NP-35") manned drifting ice station lasted until September 18, when one with an area of 16 square kilometres (6.2 sq mi) was found. Some 300 tonnes (300 long tons; 330 short tons) of cargo was disembarked from the vessel to ensure long functioning of the station. "NP-35" started operations on September 21, 2007, at the point 81°26′N 103°30′E, when flags of Russia and Saint Petersburg were raised there. 22 scientists, led by A.A.Visnevsky are working on the ice floe. The station is believed to work for a year, drifting towards the Fram Strait.

On September 22 Akademik Fedorov left for Murmansk and reached its home port, Saint Petersburg, on October 3, finishing the high latitude Arctic expedition Arktika 2007. Arthur Chilingarov sent a government telegram to congratulate expedition members on behalf of State Duma.

== Reactions ==
There was concern in the other four countries bordering the Arctic (Canada, Norway, Denmark and the United States) that Russia might claim the Arctic based on its charting of the seabed. Former Canadian Foreign Minister Peter MacKay said: "This isn't the 15th century. You can't go around the world and just plant flags and say 'We're claiming this territory'." United States Department of State spokesman Tom Casey stated that planting the flag "doesn't have any legal standing or effect on this claim."

In reply, the Russian Foreign Minister Sergey Lavrov told reporters: "The aim of this expedition is not to stake Russia's claim but to show that our shelf reaches to the North Pole." He also confirmed that Arctic territory issues "can be tackled solely on the basis of international law, the International Convention on the Law of the Sea and in the framework of the mechanisms that have in accordance with it been created for determining the borders of states which have a continental shelf." In another interview Sergey Lavrov said: "I was amazed by my Canadian counterpart’s statement that we are planting flags around. We’re not throwing flags around. We just do what other discoverers did. The purpose of the expedition is not to stake whatever rights of Russia, but to prove that our shelf extends to the North Pole. By the way on the Moon it was the same".

Lindsay Parson, (head of the Law of the Sea Group at Southampton's National Oceanography Centre in the UK) stated that Denmark (via Greenland) and Canada would have equally good chances of claiming the territory on these grounds — which both nations have stated they will do — as the Lomonosov Ridge extends from Russia across the Arctic to Greenland and northern Canada. Denmark claimed that the 1,500-kilometre (930 mi) Lomonosov Ridge was its property, the BBC's World Service radio reported early on August 12. Danish science minister Helge Sander told reporters: "The preliminary investigations done so far are very promising. There are things suggesting that Denmark could be given the North Pole."

== Analysis of expedition results ==
In mid-September 2007, Russia's Natural Resources Ministry issued a statement:

Preliminary results of an analysis of the earth crust model examined by the Arktika 2007 expedition, obtained on September 20, have confirmed that the crust structure of the Lomonosov Ridge corresponds to the world analogues of the continental crust, and it is therefore part of the Russian Federation's adjacent continental shelf.

== See also ==
- Arctic policy of Russia
- Territorial claims in the Arctic
- Energy policy of Russia
- Soviet and Russian manned drifting ice stations
- List of Russian explorers
- Arctic Resources Race
