= Aliens of the Deep =

- Promotional poster
- Directed by: James Cameron; Steven Quale
- Produced by: James Cameron; Andrew Wight
- Starring: Anatoly Sagalevich; Genya Chernaiev; Victor Nischeta; Pamela G. Conrad; Jim Childress; Dijanna Figueroa; Maya Tolstoy
- Cinematography: James Cameron; Vince Pace
- Edited by: Matthew Kregor; Fiona Wight
- Music by: Jeehun Hwang
- Production companies: Walt Disney Pictures; Walden Media; Earthship Productions
- Distributed by: Buena Vista Pictures Distribution
- Release date: January 28, 2005
- Running time: 100 minutes
- Country: United States
- Language: English
- Box office: $9 million

Aliens of the Deep is a 2005 American documentary film directed in part by James Cameron alongside fellow cameraman and friend Steven Quale, who served as second unit director on Cameron's Titanic (1997) and later Avatar (2009), and filmed in the IMAX 3D format. It was produced by Walden Media and Walt Disney Pictures. Cameron teams with NASA scientists to explore the mid-ocean ridges, submerged chains of mountains in the Atlantic and Pacific oceans that are home to some of the planet's more unusual forms of life. It was released on DVD on November 1, 2005.

== Plot ==
Cameron joins up aboard the Russian research vessel Akademik Mstislav Keldysh with a group of NASA scientists, as well as some American marine biologists, to investigate ten hydrothermal vents in both the Atlantic and Pacific. The vents have their own unique ecosystem, which support diverse organisms such as giant tube worms, swarms of blind white crabs, and vast amounts of shrimp which are capable of "seeing" water that is heated by the vents. These creatures do not require sunlight like other organisms, and instead obtain their energy from the vents. They are able to survive in the superheated and sulfurous water. Because of this, the documentary suggests that this is what life beyond Earth might look like. As some alien ecosystems are likely to be a lot harsher than a typical terrestrial ecosystem, these exotic vents provide an insight into some of the forms that alien life might take.

The documentary shows Cameron's passion for exploring the oceans, as well as his interest in extraterrestrial life. It also showcases the technology employed to reach such depths.

The film is similar to Cameron's earlier documentary, Ghosts of the Abyss (2003), which involves him journeying to the wreck of the RMS Titanic. It too was filmed in the 3-D IMAX format.

== Reception ==
On the review aggregator website Rotten Tomatoes, 84% of 61 critics' reviews are positive, with an average rating of 7.30/10. The website's consensus reads: "An amazing array of images from beneath the sea." Metacritic, which uses a weighted average, assigned the film a score of 71 out of 100, based on 18 critics, indicating "generally favorable" reviews.

== See also ==
- List of 3D films (2005–present)
- Mir (submersible)

== Bibliography ==
- MacInnis, Joseph (2004). James Cameron's Aliens of the Deep. Washington, D.C.: National Geographic Society. ISBN 0792293436. – The companion book to the film.
- Reed, Christina (February 2005). "Into the Abyss". Scientific American. pp. 24–25.
