= Arctic race =

Arctic race can refer to:

- A racial classification of people by Louis Agassiz, a 19th-century Swiss-American zoologist.
- The territorial claims in the Arctic resulted in the early 21st century a series of expeditions to the Arctic area by Russia, Canada, Denmark and the United States.
- Circumpolar peoples

== See also ==
- Arctic Race of Norway
