= Anatoly Sagalevich =

Russian scientist of Ukrainian descent

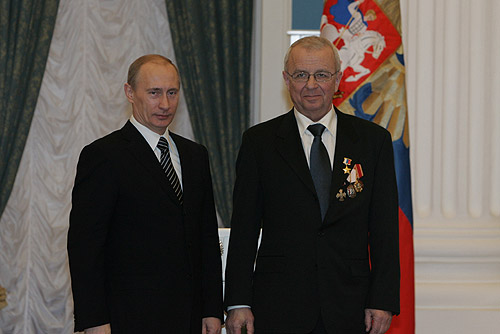
Anatoly Sagalevich (right) with President Vladimir Putin, 2008

Anatoly Mikhailovich Sagalevich (Russian: Анатолий Михайлович Сагалевич; born 5 September 1938) is a Russian explorer who, since 1995, has worked at the Shirshov Institute of Oceanology of the Russian Academy of Sciences (USSR Academy of Sciences until 1991).

Since 1979 he has been the director of the Russian (former Soviet) Deepwater Submersibles Laboratory. He received a Doctor of Sciences degree in 1985. Sagalevich took part in the construction of Pisces VIII, Pisces IX and MIR Deep Submergence Vehicles (DSV) and completed more than 300 submersions as the chief pilot of DSVs. Between 1989 and 2005 he led 28 expeditions on MIR DSV. He was the pilot of MIR during expeditions to the British passenger liner RMS Titanic, the German battleship Bismarck, the Soviet submarine K-278 Komsomolets, the Japanese submarine I-52, and the Russian submarine K-141 Kursk.

Sagalevich holds the world record for the deepest fresh water dive, at 1,637 meters (5,371 ft) (in Lake Baikal aboard a Pisces in 1990).

On 2 August 2007 Sagalevich was the pilot of MIR-1 DSV, which reached the seabed at the North Pole during the Arktika 2007 expedition.

On 10 January 2008 Sagalevich was awarded the title Hero of the Russian Federation for "courage and heroism shown in extreme conditions and successful completion of High-Latitude Arctic Deep-Water Expedition."

== Honours and awards ==
- Hero of the Russian Federation (9 January 2008), "for courage and heroism displayed in extreme conditions, and the success of high-latitude Arctic deep-sea expedition."
- Order of Lenin – for MIR-1 and MIR-2 creation
- Order of the Badge of Honour – for deepwater research of Lake Baikal
- Order of Courage – for special underwater operations on Soviet submarine K-278 Komsomolets
- Lowell Thomas Award – for valuable contribution into conducting deepwater ocean research in the 20th century.
- 2007 Adventurer of the Year award from prestigious Los Angeles Adventurers' Club for Arctic dive to North Pole.
- 2008 The William Beebe Award The Explorers Club
- 2009 The Ralph White Award from The Explorers Club
- 2002 – Member of the Academy of Arts and Sciences underwater U.S. category "Science"

== Books ==
- Sagalevich, Anatoly M.; Isley III; Paul T. (2009). The Deep. Voyages to Titanic and Beyond. Botanical Press. ISBN 978-0-9817010-0-4.

== Filmography ==
| Year | Title | Role | Notes |
|---|---|---|---|
| 1992 | Titanica | as himself | Head explorer |
| 1997 | Titanic | Anatoly Milkailavich | |
| 2002 | Expedition: Bismarck | as himself | |
| 2003 | Ghosts of the Abyss | as himself | |
| 2005 | Aliens of the Deep | as himself | |
| 2020 | Science grand format | as himself | Season 5: Episode 11: Titanic, au coeur de l'épave |

== See also ==
- List of Heroes of the Russian Federation
- List of Russian inventors
