= Artur Chilingarov =

Armenian-Russian polar explorer (1939–2024)

- Артур Чилингаров
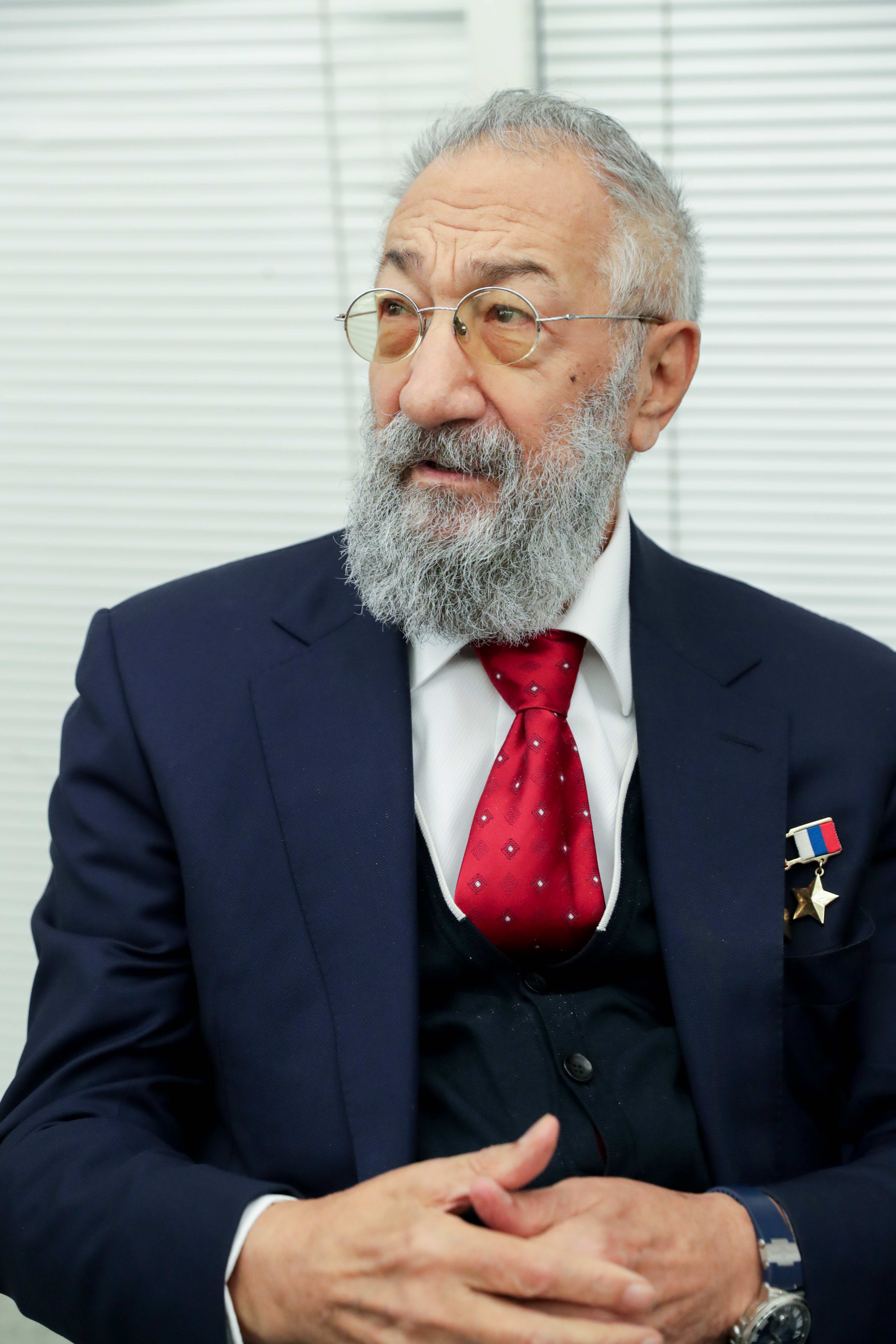
- Chilingarov in 2019

Member of the State Duma (Party List Seat)
- In office 5 October 2016 – 1 June 2024
- In office 24 December 2007 – 21 December 2011

Russian Federation Senator from Tula Oblast
- Representing the Executive
- In office 14 November 2011 – 1 October 2014
- Preceded by: Anatoly Vaskov
- Succeeded by: Yulia Veprintseva

Member of the State Duma for Nenets Autonomous Okrug
- In office 11 January 1994 – 24 December 2007
- Preceded by: constituency established
- Succeeded by: constituencies abolished; Sergey Kotkin (in 2016)
- Constituency: Nenets (No. 218)

Personal details
- Born: 25 September 1939 Leningrad, Russian SFSR, USSR
- Died: 1 June 2024 (aged 84) Moscow, Russia
- Party: United Russia (2002–2024); Fatherland - All Russia (1998–2002); Ivan Rybkin Bloc (1995); Civic Union (1992–1994); Renewal
- Spouse: Tatyana Chilingarova
- Children: Nikolay; Ksenia
- Education: Leningrad Higher Marine Engineering School (DSc)
- Occupation: Scientist; Explorer
- Religion: Russian Orthodox
- Scientific career
- Fields: Oceanography; Meteorology; Geography
- Workplaces: Arctic and Antarctic Research Institute; USSR Hydrometeorology State Committee; Russian Academy of Science

Artur Nikolaevich Chilingarov (Russian: Артур Николаевич Чилингаров; 25 September 1939 – 1 June 2024) was an Armenian-Russian polar explorer, a corresponding member of the Russian Academy of Sciences. He was awarded the title of Hero of the Soviet Union in 1986 and the title of Hero of the Russian Federation in 2008. He was the president of State Polar Academy.

Chilingarov was a member of the United Russia party; he was a member of the State Duma from 1993 to 2011, and again from 2016 until his death in 2024 and was the representative of Tula Oblast in the Federation Council between 2011 and 2014.

== Biography ==
Chilingarov was born in Leningrad to Russian mother and Armenian father. His father was born in Gyumri (Leninakan) and moved to Vladikavkaz at a young age.

In 1963, he graduated from the Arctic faculty of the S.O. Makarov Leningrad Higher Marine Engineering School (now the Admiral S. O. Makarov State Maritime Academy). As an engineer-oceanographer, he was directed to the Tiksi observatory of the Arctic and Antarctic Research Institute. In 1965, he was elected first secretary of the Bulun Komsomol district committee. In 1969, he was appointed head of the drift ice station "North Pole-19" and, in 1971, Chilingarov headed the Bellingshausen Station of the 17th Soviet Antarctic Expedition.

Between 1974 and 1979, he worked in the Western sector of the Arctic as head of the Amderma Administration of hydrometeorology and environmental control. Under his direction, new forms of Arctic operative navigation support were implemented; for the first time, experimental work on cargo transfers to fast ice during wintertime were carried out in the Yamal Peninsula. Chilingarov summarized his experience in navigation support on the Northern Sea Route in his dissertation for the scientific degree of a kandidat of geographical sciences.

In 1985, he headed the special expedition on the research vessel Mikhail Somov, which was ice-blocked in the Southern Ocean. For successful performance of the rescue operations in extreme conditions and for displayed organizational abilities and courage, Chilingarov was awarded the title of Hero of the Soviet Union on 14 February 1986.

In January 2002, he led an expedition to the South Pole along with 14 other tourists on an Antonov An-3 biplane. When a mechanical problem grounded the aircraft at the South Pole, Chilingarov and other VIPs were flown by American Hercules LC130 aircraft to McMurdo and then onward to Christchurch. The rest of the group arranged a pick-up from Adventure Network International, who operate tourist flights to the South Pole. In January 2007, he led a helicopter expedition to Antarctica, he was joined by FSB chief Nikolay Patrushev and visited the South Pole and Amundsen-Scott station.

During the 2007 Russian North Pole expedition, Chilingarov, accompanied by five other explorers from different countries, descended on two Mir submersibles to the seabed 13,980 feet below the North Pole in order to plant the Russian flag there and gather specimens of the seabed. In regard to the territorial claims in the Arctic, Chilingarov was quoted as saying, "The Arctic is Russian. We must prove the North Pole is an extension of the Russian landmass".

In July 2008, Russia announced it was sending Mir submersibles to descend one mile to the bottom of Lake Baikal to conduct geological and biological tests on its unique ecosystem. Chilingarov is scheduled to join in 60 dives in total. On 29 July 2008, Chilingarov took part in a dive to a depth of 1,580 meters in Lake Baikal, just short of the record 1,637 meters.

On 10 January 2008, Chilingarov was awarded the title of Hero of the Russian Federation for "courage and heroism displayed in extreme conditions and for the successful completion of the High-Latitude Arctic Deep-Water Expedition."

In December 2012, Chilingarov supported the anti-Magnitsky bill to ban U.S. adoptions of Russian orphans, although he said earlier that there was no need to rush the legislation: "It concerns children, and you have to be accurate with it".

Chilingarov died in Moscow on 1 June 2024, at the age of 84. His seat was taken up by Natalya Kaptelinina.

== Death ==
Artur Chilingarov died on June 1, 2024, in Moscow at the age of 84, following a long and serious illness.[42] Vladimir Putin expressed his condolences over Chilingarov’s death. The farewell ceremony took place on June 4 at the Cathedral of Christ the Saviour. Artur Chilingarov was buried at Novodevichy Cemetery (section 11, row 8, plot 6).

== Awards ==
- Hero of the Russian Federation (9 January 2008) – for courage and heroism displayed in extreme conditions, and the success of high-latitude Arctic expedition
- Hero of the Soviet Union (14 February 1986) – for exemplary performance targets for the release of the research vessel Mikhail Somov from the ice of Antarctica, leadership in rescue operations during the period of drift and displaying courage and heroism
- Order of Merit for the Fatherland, 3rd class (12 June 2007) – for active participation in legislative activities and the success of high-latitude air expedition to South Pole
- Order of Naval Merit (27 January 2003) – for outstanding contribution to research, development and use of the oceans
- Order of Lenin
- Order of the Red Banner of Labour
- Order of the Badge of Honour
- Honoured meteorologist of the Russian Federation (11 February 2005)
- USSR State Prize – for the development of methods of cargo handling on fast ice in Yamal
- Order of Polar Star (Yakutia, 25 November 2002)
- Order of St. Mesrop Mashtots (Armenia, 17 September 2008) – in connection with the 17th anniversary of the independence of the Republic of Armenia
- Commander of the Order of Bernardo O'Higgins (Chile, 2006)
- Order of Friendship (South Ossetia), (19 June 2009) – for his great contribution to strengthening friendship and cooperation between peoples, actively promote the development of democracy and parliamentarianism in the Republic of South Ossetia and to provide practical assistance to its citizens in the implementation of voting rights
- Chevalier Legion of Honour (France, 2010)
- Medal of Anania Shirakatsi (Armenia, 31 October 2000) – for his contribution to the strengthening and development of Armenian-Russian friendship
- Order of St. Prince Daniil Moskovsky, 2nd class (Russian Orthodox Church, 2009) – in consideration of the works, for their active participation in the development of church life and in connection with the 70th anniversary of the birth
- Medal "Symbol of Science" (2007)

== See also ==
- List of Heroes of the Russian Federation
