= Sector principle =

Aspect of International law on territorial claims

The Antarctic territorial claims are divided into sectors, in accordance with the sector principle.

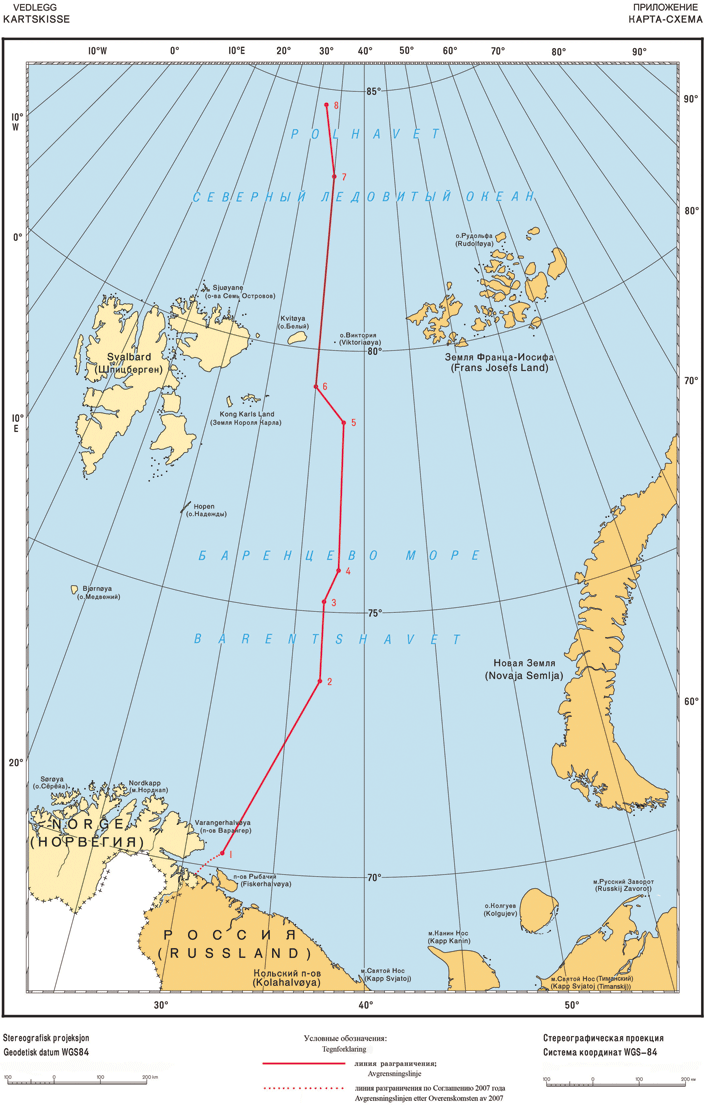
Boundary in the Barents Sea between Norway and Russia, settled in 2010.

The sector principle, also known as the sector theory, is a principle in international law which asserts that territorial claims in the polar regions shall be determined by longitude lines. The territories are thus divided into wedge-shaped sectors, each one having their apex at the geographical pole with their base extending down to an arbitrary latitude. The sector principle has historically constituted the basis on which territorial claims in the Arctic have been made, although its usage has failed to gain universal international recognition.

The principle is today more or less abandoned; Canada stopped referring to it in 2006 and the 2010 boundary negotiation in the Barents Sea between Norway and Russia contains no mention of the sector principle. It has arguably seen a broader implementation in Antarctica, whose territorial claims are divided into sectors. This division is, however, not seen as an extension of any particular state's territory due to the large bodies of water separating the continent from other land masses.

== Arctic ==
The principle was first proposed in 1907 by Canadian senator Pascal Poirier. He was delivering a speech in support of his own motion which sought to claim possession of the Arctic Archipelago on Canada's behalf. Poirier's motion was originally dismissed, and his Sector theory deemed a "one-man idea". The principle would however gain immense traction in subsequent years. In 1925, Canada became the first nation to extend their maritime boundary to the North Pole, using the sector principle as justification for doing so. The claim is not universally recognized.

In 1926, the Soviet Union followed the example set by Canada, declaring all land and water located between the North Pole and their mainland to be Soviet territory. The Soviet sector stretched from the Barents Sea in the west to the Bering Strait in the east, and from there to the pole. Norway objected vehemently to the Soviet claim on Franz Josef Land, an archipelago north of Soviet territory close to the sector boundary between the two countries.

The remaining nations with a coast on the Arctic Ocean, namely the United States (Alaska), Denmark (Greenland) and Norway, do not uphold the sector principle and regard its usage in the Arctic to be unlawful.

== Antarctica ==
It is uncertain if the sector principle is applicable in Antarctica, since large bodies of water separate the continent from any other land mass. Territorial claims around the South Pole are therefore not based on the idea of an extension of any particular nation-state, as is the case with the North Pole. Nevertheless, Chile and Argentina have both made attempts to invoke the sector principle. Today, all Antarctic claims are modeled as sectors, even though the United States and others have opposed it. The dispute is still not resolved, but following the Antarctic Treaty of 1959, further discussion was halted.
