= Arctic resources race =

Competition over resources in the Arctic

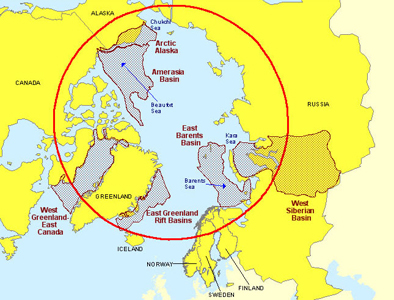
Resource basins in the Arctic Circle region. Source: United States Geological Survey

The Arctic resources race is the competition between global entities for newly available natural resources of the Arctic. Under the United Nations Convention of the Law of the Sea, five nations have the legal right to exploit the Arctic's natural resources within their exclusive economic zones: Canada, Russia, Denmark, Norway, and the United States (though the U.S. has yet to ratify the treaty, it considers the treaty to be customary international law and abides by it).

In the early 21st century, controversies about the Arctic region and its resources created greater potential for conflicts between nations that have long had conflicting territorial claims and differing opinions of how to manage the area. The Arctic region is also home to an estimated 400,000 indigenous people. If the ice continues to melt at the current rate, then these indigenous people are at risk of being displaced. The acceleration of ice depletion will contribute to climate change as a whole: melting ice releases methane, ice reflects incoming solar radiation, and without it will cause the ocean to absorb more radiation (albedo effect), heating up the water causing more ocean acidification, and melting ice will cause a rise in sea level.

== Background ==
The Arctic consists of multiple sub-regions: Russian Arctic, Canadian Arctic, Greenland (Kalaallit Nunaat), Northern Alaska (United States), Svalbard (Norway), Iceland, Fennoscandia. In addition to these sub-regions, the Arctic Ocean and its multiple seas (Greenland Sea, Barents Sea, Kara Sea, Laptev Sea, East Siberian Sea, Chuckchi Sea, Beaufort Sea, etc.) make the Arctic a vast region with a variety of natural resources.

== Resources ==
=== Oil and gas ===
The U.S. Geological Survey estimates that undiscovered oil and gas reserves in the Arctic amount to 22% of the world's total, about 412 billion barrels of oil. A Brookings Institution summary reported:

By the mid to late 2000s, interest in offshore hydrocarbons had surged owing to receding sea ice making more of the region accessible, rising global energy demand, U.S. Government estimates of large undiscovered oil and gas reserves throughout the Arctic, and a more politically stable investment climate relative to other global regions with large hydrocarbon resources. These factors have spurred the Arctic coastal states to support offshore oil and gas development...

The first offshore oil platform in the Arctic was Prirazlomnaya in the Pechora Sea off Russia, operated by the Russian company Gazprom; it began production in late 2013. Russia jailed 30 Greenpeace activists protesting the platform and seized their ship. The largest Arctic platform in the Arctic is Goliat in the Barents Sea off Norway, co-owned by Eni Norge AS and Statoil; it began production in 2015. Royal Dutch Shell had $7 billion project to extract oil from the Chukchi Sea off Alaska, Polar Pioneer, but abandoned the project in 2015 after determining that it was "not sufficient to warrant further exploration". Contributing to these decision was the record-low price of oil and the high operating costs of operating in a remote region with extreme weather.

Arctic oil production is costly; in October 2015, the break-even point (price required to cover the costs of production, transportation etc.) of known but undeveloped Arctic oil reservoirs was $78.6 per barrel; this was more expensive to produce than all other forms of oil except for oil sands.

=== Minerals ===
The Arctic has vast deposits of economically valuable mineral resources. Significant deposits of phosphate, bauxite, diamonds, iron ore, and gold are located in the Arctic region. Deposits of silver, copper, and zinc also exist in the Arctic. Resource extraction is extremely difficult. In Greenland, retreating ice caps have revealed deposits of rare-earth metals and other minerals, sparking a race between Europe and China over access to this resource. While in 2012 Greenland had only one operating mine, more than a hundred new sites were being planned. The Barentsburg coal mine on the Norwegian island of Svalbard is open, but has operated at a loss for many years.

=== Fish ===
Emerging fisheries are another resource in the Arctic. Many marine species have traditional cultural value to Alaska Natives; these marine species are being threatened by climate change.

In 2015, the five nations with waters adjacent to the central Arctic High Seas agreed upon "interim measures on control of commercial fishing" in the central Arctic High Seas. A December 2015 meeting of these states, plus an additional five cooperating nations, "reaffirmed that, although commercial fishing in the high seas area of the central Arctic Ocean appears unlikely to occur in the near future, the state of currently available scientific information needs to be improved in order to reduce the substantial uncertainties associated with Arctic fish stocks." In April 2016, representatives of the nations again met to negotiate and discuss commercial fishing in the Arctic high seas.

=== Bioprospecting ===
By 2009, more than 40 companies were engaging in bioprospecting in the Arctic.

=== Trade routes ===
Trade routes in the Arctic are debatably one of the most valuable resources. Currently, three shipping passages are in operation: the Northeast Passage (NEP), the Northwest Passage (NWP), and the Transpolar Passage (TPP). In addition, other passages that previously were inaccessible are now becoming accessible due to climate change and sea ice melting. The Arctic Ocean fosters shorter trade routes between 80 percent of the most industrialized nations. The consequences of these shorter trade routes are less fuel consumption, less carbon emissions and faster transportation of goods.

=== Undiscovered resources ===
The U.S. Geological Survey conducted research on the undiscovered resources north of the Arctic Circle. The research revealed that there are at least 50 million barrels of natural gas and oil underneath the Arctic seabed.

=== Tourism ===
Some cruise ships offer visits to the Arctic Ocean.

== Stakeholders ==
Under UNCLOS, five nations have exclusive economic zones (EEZs) in the Arctic region. These nations have the legal right to exploit the resources within their EEZs.

=== Russia ===
In 1915, Russia became the first nation to drill in the Arctic and has continued to drill in the region since. Since oil and natural gas account for a large portion of Russia's federal budget revenue and exports, Russia has been very interested in extracting these resources from the region. Russia's share of the oil reserves in the Arctic Ocean has been estimated to account for half of the undiscovered oil in the region. Furthermore, 20% of Russia's GDP is generated in the Arctic. Russia has also significantly increased its military presence in the Arctic region, creating tension amongst nations. Russia currently has 40 icebreakers, making it the world leader in icebreakers.

In August 2007, in an "openly choreographed publicity stunt" extensively covered by Russian state-controlled television, two Russian submersibles in the Arktika 2007 expedition planted a Russian flag on the sea bottom at the North Pole, in a bid to symbolically bolster Russia's disputed claim to "nearly half of the floor of the Arctic Ocean and potential oil or other resources there". However, no other Arctic nations recognized this stunt as having legal significance.

=== Canada ===
On December 20, 2016, U.S. president Barack Obama and Canadian prime minister Justin Trudeau issued a joint statement indefinitely banning drilling in the Arctic, which will be reviewed every five years based on a climate and marine science life-cycle assessment. This ban encompasses most of the U.S. waters and all of the Canadian waters in the Arctic. Canada has a fleet of 15 icebreakers.

=== Kingdom of Denmark ===
The Kingdom of Denmark has expressed interest in resource exploitation, but has stressed the need to do so in a manner that respects the Arctic's nature and environment. In its Arctic strategy report, Denmark acknowledged the importance of practicing the "highest international standards of safety, health, environment, preparedness and response" when extracting resources in the region. The report also included the nation's intent to "seize the many opportunities in the Arctic to create more growth and development" and acknowledged that it needed to realize the region's economic potential. Denmark has four icebreakers.

=== Norway ===
Norway has a history of Arctic drilling, and continues to express interest in it. Drilling in the Norwegian Continental Shelf began in 1966 and has continued to be a huge part of Norway's economic growth. Over the years since drilling began in the region, the industry has created values in excess of NOK 12,000 billion, and in 2012 alone, the petroleum sector accounted for 23 percent of value creation in the country. A BP report declared Norway to be the seventh largest natural gas producer in the world in 2015. It has also been projected that Norwegian gas production will increase substantially in the near future. Norway has also taken advantage of the Arctic tourism opportunities that have just recently been made possible. There are currently many Arctic cruise options to choose from, including one to the North Pole. Norway has two icebreakers.

=== United States ===
In November 2016, citing the need for environmental protection, the U.S. Department of the Interior instituted a ban on drilling in the Beaufort Sea and Chukchi Sea of the Arctic between 2017 and 2022. One month later, in a joint statement with Canadian prime minister Justin Trudeau, President Barack Obama used his authority under the Outer Continental Shelf Lands Act of 1953 to extend the protections permanently.

The United States has two icebreakers. It is unclear where the U.S. stands on Arctic resource exploitation under the administration of Donald Trump, who took office in January 2017. During his presidential campaign, Trump repeatedly denied climate change, called for an energy policy focused on fossil fuels, and pledged to repeal environmental regulations. In April 2017, it was reported that Trump was preparing an order to reverse the U.S.'s Arctic drilling ban. It is not entirely clear whether Trump has the authority to unilaterally withdrawal the outer continental shelf protection; most legal experts believe that the protection may only be withdrawn by an act of Congress. Adding to the uncertainty of this issue is the fact that under this new administration, U.S. Secretary of State and former CEO of Exxon Mobil, Rex Tillerson, was on the U.S. Chairmanship of the Arctic Council.

=== Indigenous people ===
There are approximately 4 million people living in the Arctic, 10% of whom are indigenous peoples. Indigenous people have permanent representation in the Arctic Council. Although most indigenous communities fear resource exploitation will lead to negative environmental impacts that will negatively affect their well-being, some see it as an important economic opportunity for those who are struggling to adapt to changes in the regional climate.

=== Other nations ===
As the Arctic's many resources become more available for exploitation, other nations with no legal exploitation rights are trying to stake a claim in the resource race. Many have argued that the Arctic region is a "global commons" and cannot be governed by a few countries. Particularly, non-Arctic nations are concerned with the effects that changes in the Arctic climate will have on global climate change. In terms of environmental degradation, the negative effects of resource extraction in the Arctic region are not limited to the borders of the countries in which they originated. For example, melting polar ice caps contribute to sea level rise, which threaten coastal regions and low-lying countries such as Bangladesh and the Netherlands. The climatic changes in the Arctic region have significant impacts on the rest of the world, as "northern ecosystems are increasingly linked to the rest of the globe through myriad physical, biological, cultural, and economic ties."

China has argued for governance rights in the region, arguing that it is a "near Arctic" country (noted in its 2018 Arctic Policy White paper) and is affected by the climate effects of the region. China was granted observer status in the Arctic Council in 2013. In 2016, China indicated that it planned to ship cargo through the Northwest Passage, setting up a conflict with Canada, which asserts sovereignty over the area. In addition to China, 11 other non-Arctic nations have observer status in the Arctic Council: France, Germany, the Netherlands, Poland, Spain, United Kingdom, Italy, Japan, South Korea, Singapore, and India.

== Impacts on indigenous communities ==
Accelerated climate change in the Arctic- as a direct result from resource exploitation and increased anthropogenic activity in the region- will drastically alter the livelihoods of indigenous people in this Arctic. Indigenous people depend heavily on the natural environment for necessities such as hunting, harvesting, fishing, and herding. Melting sea ice and extreme weather patterns threaten the animals that survive off the established conditions and thus threaten the people that depend on such animals for food. Changes in this natural environment will have impacts on their economy, society, culture and health. Indigenous people have listed contaminants, land use, climate, security and access as their main points of concerns. Historically, many indigenous communities believe that their "land has been expropriated and resources exploited without due regard to indigenous peoples". However, indigenous people have recently had their political organizations recognized by international communities and the human rights of indigenous people have solidified in those communities as well.

=== Alaska ===
In 2003 it was identified by the Army Corps of Engineers that four Alaskan villages would need to relocate because of risk of flooding and erosion. More villages have been added to that list from the time frame between 2003 and 2016. One of these villages, Shishmaref, number 650 people and they are at risk of becoming the first American community climate refugees. However, relocation is proving difficult because there is no governmental institutional framework that exists for the aid of climate refugees in the United States. the Obama administration promised to fund $50.4 billion to help with relocation efforts in 2016.

=== Sami people ===
The Sami people live primarily in north Sweden, Norway, Finland, and Russia and have survived for generations fishing and hunting. The changes in climate has caused unpredictable conditions in the ice, which the Sami people have come to rely on and predict so that they and their herds can move across it. In one instance, 300 of their reindeer sank in the ice and drowned. Land grabs by the Swedish government are also prevalent and lacks in communication between them and the Sami people.

=== Displacement ===
Increased anthropogenic activity in the Arctic region, attributed to the resource race, has contributed to the threat of indigenous displacement: as the climate changes in the region, local animals’ normal patterns are disrupted, affecting the communities’ food supplies; melting permafrost and erosion has damaged local infrastructure, including homes, buildings, sewage systems, etc.; unstable and unpredictable ice patterns have affected mobility vital for transportation, hunting, travel, and communication. Furthermore, the changes and variability in the climate have left indigenous communities who rely on traditional knowledge vulnerable and essentially "strip arctic residents of their considerable knowledge, predictive ability, and self-confidence in making a living from their resources."

=== Environmental degradation ===
It has been argued that Arctic trade routes will decrease global greenhouse gas emissions from shipping because these routes would be much shorter than the current routes. However, increased shipping in the region will contribute to Arctic environmental degradation and will severely impact indigenous communities. According to the National Oceanic and Atmospheric Administration, “Potential impacts from shipping include: the release of oil through accidental or illegal discharge, ship strikes on marine mammals, the introduction of alien species, disruption of migratory patterns of marine mammals, increased anthropogenic noise and increased atmospheric emissions.” Additionally, marine vessels are a large source of greenhouse gas and air pollutant emissions, which impact local air quality and human health.

Offshore drilling in the Arctic also poses huge threats to the regional ecosystem and indigenous communities. Pollution from the offshore drilling industry can damage marine animals and disrupt their migratory patterns, destroy flora and fauna, and interfere with subsistence lifestyles of indigenous communities. There have already been several cases in which it was determined that anthropogenic activity in the Arctic region resulted in environmental damage. In 2013, the U.S. Environmental Protection Agency fined Shell $1.1 million for air quality violations on several offshore drilling vessels in the Arctic.

=== Economic implications ===
While some indigenous communities believe that the resource race will provide economic opportunity, others are skeptical of how much it will actually benefit them economically. In the past, economic benefits of resource extraction in the Arctic has created revenue for governments and private entities, while relatively little if any of its wealth was directly returned to improve the economic and social well-being of the local people in the regions where extraction occurred.

=== Food security ===
The changing climate in the Arctic is affecting food security in indigenous communities. When the ice is unsuitable to travel on, it is also near impossible to hunt on. Additionally, food security is vulnerable to climate change because the food supply consists of local species that are themselves sensitive to climatic changes. There is also concern over the toxins found in local species and the risk of oil contamination in indigenous communities' food supplies.

== Climate change and the Arctic ==
Climate change has a worldwide effect, but many studies show that warmer trends are more intense in higher latitudes, such as the Arctic. This makes its communities more vulnerable. Thus far, average temperatures have risen almost twice as fast as in the rest of the world. Records show changes in various parts of the biophysical environment of the Arctic, such as sea-ice extent, area of permafrost and depth, river hydrology, geophysical processes, and the distribution of marine and terrestrial species of the Arctic. The warming of the Earth's atmosphere and surface is mainly attributed to the greenhouse effect. The gases that have a role in the greenhouse effect are mainly carbon dioxide, methane, nitrous oxide, and chlorofluorocarbons (CFCs). Even though carbon dioxide is the abundant greenhouse gas, these other gases actually absorb radiation more efficiently and persist in the atmosphere longer than carbon dioxide, so their warming effects increase with time.

Climate change is making Arctic resources more accessible. For example, in Greenland the retreat of the ice caps has exposed mineral deposits, such as rare-earth metals, that can be extracted and used for technologies like cell phones and military guidance systems. Another expected effect of climate change on the Arctic is the creation of new trade waterways through the north, further exploiting the area. Changes in the Arctic will affect resource competition and conflict in the upcoming years.

Changes in the Arctic will have worldwide impacts. The Arctic basin is an ice-covered ocean that has strong feedback effects on many parts of the climate system. Since the Arctic regulates heat exchange between the ocean and atmosphere, the sea ice decline is expected to affect atmospheric circulation and weather patterns. Other effects may also include diminished rainfall in many parts of the world, leading to desertification in many areas and a decline in their ability to sustain agriculture. These changes indirectly create more conflict in water scarcity and will increase migration of communities. More direct effects of the degradation of the Arctic include significant rise in global sea levels, which will displace low coastal areas around the world and result in loss of agricultural lands.

== See also ==
- Arctic sanctuary
- Save the Arctic
