= Andrew Wight =

Australian screenwriter and producer (1959–2012)

Andrew Wight (14 November 1959 – 4 February 2012) was an Australian screenwriter and producer best known for his 2011 film Sanctum. He produced over 45 films including television documentaries, live television specials and 3D IMAX films. His credits include Ghosts of the Abyss, Aliens of the Deep and Expedition: Bismarck. Wight was honoured with the Australian Geographic Society Spirit of Adventure Awards in 1989.

== Biography ==
Wight grew up on the family farm "Tarqua" near Harrow in western-Victoria, and attended Hamilton College as a boarder between 1972 and 1977. It was here that he developed a taste for caving, exploring the nearby Byaduk Caves network of lava caves, under the direction of his Chemistry teacher, accompanied by a few other close school friends. In subsequent years, and throughout the 1980s, he became a highly-skilled and respected cave diving explorer and instructor, and played several key roles in the management of the Cave Divers Association of Australia (CDAA) Inc. In 1988, he led a team of cave diving explorers on an expedition to attempt a record cave dive in Pannikin Plain Cave on the Nullarbor Plain, where flash floods turned the expedition into a life-or-death struggle. This was captured on film by his support team, and eventually published as Nullarbor Dreaming. This short film launched his career as an international film-maker and culminated in him becoming James Cameron's right-hand man on many 3D and other film projects. Sanctum was inspired by his Nullarbor experience.

== Death ==
On 4 February 2012, Wight was killed in a helicopter crash at Jaspers Brush near the town of Berry, New South Wales, while working on filming National Geographic’s television documentary titled DeepSea Challenge.

The crash also claimed the life of American filmmaker Mike deGruy. Wight was piloting the helicopter when his pilot-side door opened. A report noted that when Wight leaned out to close it he likely removed his hand from the cyclic control causing the nose of the craft to pitch toward the sky and the tail to hit the ground where the helicopter burst into flames.

James Cameron, who by this point had become close friends with Wight, said, "They died doing exactly what they loved most, heading out to sea on a new and personally challenging expedition".

== See also ==
- Cave Divers Association of Australia
