= Ghosts of the Abyss =

2003 documentary film directed by James Cameron

- Theatrical release poster
- Directed by: James Cameron
- Produced by: John Bruno; James Cameron; Chuck Comisky; Janace Tashjian; Andrew Wight
- Starring: Bill Paxton; James Cameron; Dr. John Broadwater; Dr. Lori Johnston
- Cinematography: Vince Pace; D. J. Roller
- Edited by: David C. Cook; Ed W. Marsh; Sven Pape; John Refoua
- Music by: Joel McNeely
- Production companies: Walden Media; Earthship Productions; Ascot Elite Entertainment Group; Golden Village; Telepool; UGC PH
- Distributed by: Buena Vista Pictures Distribution (Note: Distributed by Buena Vista Pictures Distribution under the Walt Disney Pictures banner.)
- Release dates: March 31, 2003 (premiere); April 11, 2003 (limited)
- Running time: 61 minutes (IMAX cut); 90 minutes (original cut)
- Country: United States
- Language: English
- Budget: $13 million
- Box office: $28.7 million

Ghosts of the Abyss (also known as Titanic 3D: Ghosts of the Abyss) is a 2003 American documentary film directed by James Cameron and produced by Walden Media about the wreck of the RMS Titanic. It was directed by James Cameron after his 1997 film Titanic.

In August and September 2001, Cameron and a group of scientists staged an expedition to the Titanic wreck. They dived in Russian deep submersibles to obtain more detailed images than anyone had before. Using two small, purpose-built remotely operated vehicles, the documentary offers glimpses into the wreck and, with CGI, superimposes the ship's original appearance on the deep-dive images.

The film is narrated by Bill Paxton, who joined Cameron on the expedition and played Brock Lovett in Cameron's 1997 film Titanic. The film premiered for IMAX 3D and was nominated for a BFCA award for Best Documentary. The submersibles Mir 1 and Mir 2 carried the filming team on 12 dives.

== Plot ==
Director James Cameron returns to the site of the 1912 wreck of the RMS Titanic, aboard the Russian research vessel Akademik Mstislav Keldysh with a team of history and marine experts, and his friend Bill Paxton. Cameron and the crew document the interiors and exteriors of the wreckage using 3D technology designed for the documentary. While diving on September 11, 2001, the crew hears about the 9/11 attacks and they compare it to disaster of the Titanic.

== Cast ==
Re-enactments of events that are discussed use CGI recreations of the interior of the Titanic.

=== Historical characters ===
- Don Lynch as Titanic's designer Thomas Andrews
- Ken Marschall as White Star Line President J. Bruce Ismay
- Miguel Wilkins as Robert Hichens
- Federico Zambrano as John Jacob Astor IV
- Piper Gunnarson as Madeleine Astor
- Dale Ridge as Elizabeth Lines
- Judy Prestininzi as Margaret Brown
- Adrianna Valdez as Helen Churchill Candee
- Justin Shaw as Wireless Officer Jack Phillips
- Charlie Arneson as First Officer William McMaster Murdoch
- John Donovan as Captain Edward Smith
- Janace Tashjian as Edith Rosenbaum
- Jesse Baker as Seconds Officer Charles Lightoller
- Justin Baker as Junior Wireless Officer Harold Bride
- Aaron C. Fitzgerald as Lookout Frederick Fleet

=== Other characters ===
- Thomas Kilroy as Poker Player
- Ellen O'Brien as Passenger
- Bill Paxton as the narrator
- James Cameron as himself
- Mike Cameron as himself
- Anatoly Sagalevich as himself
- Tava Smiley as herself
- Stacey Hayes as herself
- John Broadwater as himself
- Lori Johnston as herself
- Charles Pellegrino as himself
- Jeffrey N. Ledda as himself
- Corey Jaskolski as himself
- Jason Paul as himself
- Eric Schmitz as himself
- Genya Chernaiev as herself
- Victor Nischeta as himself
- Lewis Abernathy as himself
- John Bruno as himself
- Vince Pace as himself
- Barron Christian as himself

== Release ==
Ghosts of the Abyss was the first film produced by Walden Media. The production was announced in August 2001. The film was screened out of competition at the 2003 Cannes Film Festival. It was produced in three formats; the standard 45-minute IMAX version for theatrical release, a 90-minute extended cut for VHS and DVD, and a six-hour long television series formatted version.

Buena Vista Pictures Distribution handled distribution in the United States and Canada, where it was released under the Walt Disney Pictures banner. In February 2002, Summit Entertainment announced they had picked up foreign sales under a distribution agreement with Walden. In May 2002, Telepool (Germany), Buena Vista International (United Kingdom), UGC (France), Belga Films (Benelux) and Gaga Communications (Japan) acquired distribution rights.

The feature film on the DVD is 90 minutes long and is available in a two-disc edition and as the fifth disc in the Titanic five-disc Deluxe Limited Edition. Walt Disney Studios Home Entertainment released the film on a three-disc Blu-ray 3D, Blu-ray and DVD edition on September 11, 2012. Rolling Stone included the documentary in its 2012 list of the best 3D movies.

== Reception ==
=== Box office ===
Ghosts of the Abyss grossed $17.1 million from a maximum release of 97 theaters in the United States. It also grossed $11.7 million internationally, for a total worldwide gross of $28.8 million.

=== Critical response ===
Ghosts of the Abyss received generally positive reviews from film critics, who praised its technical achievements and immersive exploration of the Titanic wreck. Reviewers consistently highlighted the film's pioneering use of IMAX 3D and deep-sea imaging technologies, noting that the documentary provided unprecedented visual clarity of the ship's interior.

Review aggregator Rotten Tomatoes reports that Ghosts of the Abyss earned 80% positive reviews based on 102 reviews and an average score of 7.10/10. The website's critical consensus reads: "The underwater footage is both beautiful and awe-inspiring." On Metacritic, the film has an average score of 67 out of 100 from 24 critics, indicating "generally favorable" reviews.

== Soundtrack ==
The score was composed and conducted by Joel McNeely, and the orchestrations were conducted by David Brown, Marshall Bowen, and Frank Macchia. The album was also recorded and mixed by Rich Breen, edited by Craig Pettigrew, and mastered by Pat Sullivan. The album was ultimately produced by James Cameron, Randy Gerston, and Joel McNeely and released by Disney's Hollywood Records label. Part of the film was filmed in St. John's, Newfoundland, Canada.

Toad the Wet Sprocket lead singer and songwriter Glen Phillips wrote the opening track, "Departure". Cameron loved the band's 1991 track "Nightingale Song", but found Columbia Records' licensing fee too high (it wanted over $5,000 for the one minute he wanted to use). In response, he contacted the band's management hoping they could re-record it for his film, only to find they had broken up in 1998. However, during the negotiations, Cameron asked if Phillips would be interested in writing a new track in the spirit of the older song, and "Departure" was created. It was produced, mixed, and all instruments played by Phillips in his garage studio, though this was not credited in the CD booklet. The closing track is "Darkness, Darkness" by Lisa Torban.
