= Exel Composites =

Finnish technology company

Exel Composites Plc
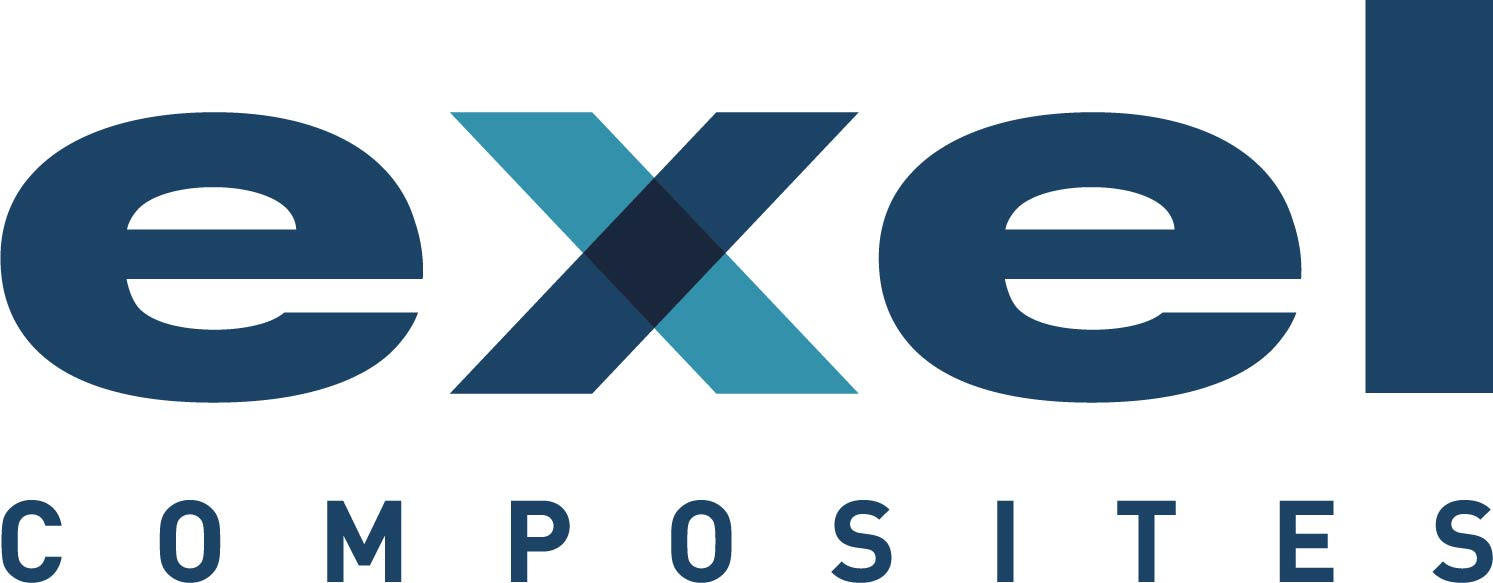
- Native name: Exel Composites Oyj
- Formerly: Exel Oyj
- Company type: Julkinen osakeyhtiö
- Traded as: Nasdaq Helsinki: EXL1V
- Founded: 1960; 66 years ago
- Founder: Yrjö Aho
- Headquarters: Mäntyharju, Finland
- Area served: Worldwide
- Key people: Paul Sohlberg (CEO)
- Products: Composite profiles and tubes; sports equipment (defunct)
- Revenue: 103.2 million euros (2025)
- Net income: -6.1 million euros (2025)
- Number of employees: 632 (2025)
- Website: exelcomposites.com

Exel Composites Plc (natively Exel Composites Oyj, formerly known as Exel Oyj) is a Finnish company specialized in composite profiles and tubes for industrial applications. Exel was founded in 1960 by Yrjö Aho. The company is listed on Nasdaq Helsinki.

The name Exel came from a combination of the words explosive electronics, with the company initially producing electric blasting caps The company later moved onto production of sports equipment, with a focus on ski poles, before diversifying into a wider range of composite products.

As of 2024, Exel has production plants in Finland (Joensuu and Mäntyharju), Austria (Kapfenberg), the United States (Erlanger, Kentucky), and China (Nanjing). In addition, the company has a plant in Goa, India, through Kineco Exel Composites India, a joint venture between Exel Composites and Kineco Ltd.

== Recent financial performance and restructuring ==
In 2023, Exel Composites reported a significant deterioration in its financial performance. Revenue decreased by approximately 30%, and net result turned negative.

Exel Composites reported negative net results for three consecutive financial years, from 2023 to 2025 and no dividend was paid for the financial years 2023, 2024 and 2025.

Exel Composites' share price declined by more than 90 %, from 8.10 € at the end of 2021 to 0.45 € at the end of 2025.

As part of its restructuring, Exel Composites shut down or reorganized several production sites:

- In 2023, the company shut down production at its Runcorn factory in the United Kingdom, resulting in 48 job losses and an asset write-down of 1.1 million euros.
- In 2023, the company downsized its United States factory and recorded an asset write-down of 4.3 million euros.
- In December 2024, the company announced the closure of its Oudenaarde factory in Belgium, ending the employment of approximately 50 employees and recording an asset write-down of approximately 2.5 million euros.

In July 2025, the company disclosed a cybersecurity incident resulting in a confirmed data breach. The company stated that some personal data of employees and shareholders as well as some business information had been compromised.
