= Akademik Mstislav Keldysh =

Russian scientific research vessel

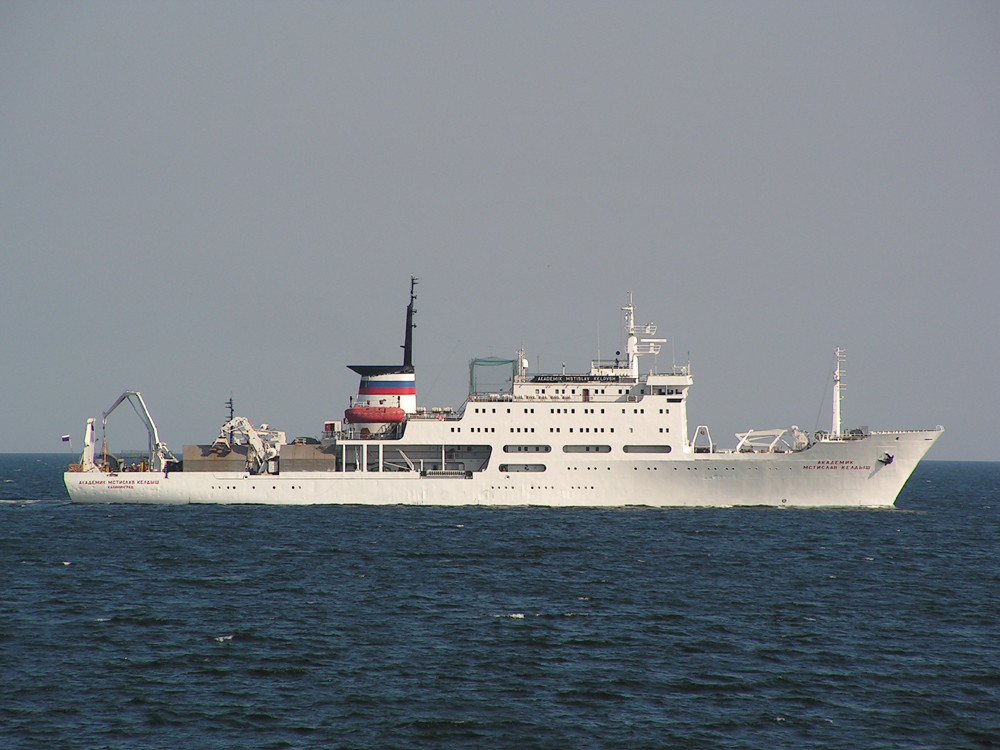
- R/V Akademik Mstislav Keldysh in 2006

History

Russia
- Namesake: Mstislav Keldysh
- Owner: P.P. Shirshov Institute of Oceanology.
- Operator: Russian Academy of Science
- Port of registry: Russia
- Ordered: Unknown
- Builder: Hollming Oy, Rauma, Finland
- Laid down: Unknown
- Launched: 28 December 1980
- In service: 15 March 1981
- Refit: 1987
- Homeport: Kaliningrad, Russia
- Identification: IMO number: 7811018; MMSI number: 273411400; Callsign: UFJI
- Status: in active service

General characteristics
- Displacement: 6,240 tons
- Length: 122.2 m (400 ft 11 in)
- Beam: 17.82 m (58 ft 6 in)
- Height: 10.4 m (34 ft 1 in)
- Draft: 5.89 m (19 ft 4 in)
- Installed power: (4) diesel engines, 5,840 hp (4,350 kW) each
- Speed: 12.5 knots (23.2 km/h; 14.4 mph) max
- Range: 20,000 km (12,000 mi)
- Endurance: 303 days
- Boats & landing craft carried: Mir DSVs
- Complement: ~90

RV Akademik Mstislav Keldysh (Russian: Академик Мстислав Келдыш) is a 6,240 ton Russian scientific research vessel. It has made over 50 voyages, and is best known as the support vessel of the Mir submersibles. The vessel is owned by the Shirshov Institute of Oceanology of the Russian Academy of Sciences in Moscow, and is homeported in Kaliningrad on the Baltic Sea. Named after the Soviet mathematician Mstislav Keldysh, it usually has 90 people on board (45 crew members, 20 or more pilots, engineers and technicians, 10 to 12 scientists and about 12 passengers). Among its facilities are 17 laboratories and a library.

== History ==
The ship was built in Rauma, Finland, by Hollming Oy for the Soviet Academy of Sciences (now the Russian Academy of Sciences). Construction of the vessel was completed on 28 December 1980.

It started operations on 15 March 1981 for the Soviet Union. The Mir submersibles were added to her equipment in 1987.

Keldysh was involved in the search for Soviet submarine K-278 Komsomolets, lost off the northeastern coast of Norway in 1989 after fire broke out on board. In addition to its nuclear reactor's core material, the submarine was carrying two nuclear torpedoes. Concern over the potential effects of the high-energy nuclear material on the rich fishing areas in which it lay prompted an effort to locate the sub's wreckage and ascertain its condition. Two months after the sinking, Keldysh located the wreckage of K-278 in June 1989 and Soviet governmental representatives labeled the risk of leaks to be "insignificant". Nevertheless, Keldysh mounted two expeditions to the wreck of K-278 (1994 and 1996) to seal fractures in the sub's hull.

The Keldysh has made expeditions to two famous wrecks, the British liner Titanic and the German battleship Bismarck. Filmmaker James Cameron led three of those expeditions: two to the Titanic, in 1996 (for his film Titanic, which featured the Keldysh in present-day scenes) and 2001 (for his 2003 documentary film Ghosts of the Abyss), and one to the Bismarck in 2002 (for the Discovery Channel special Expedition: Bismarck). Cameron also led an expedition from the Keldysh for his 2005 documentary Aliens of the Deep. The Keldysh also provided its significant deep diving submersibles MIR 1 and MIR 2 for the expedition in 1998 to film the expected recovery of gold from the World War II Japanese submarine I-52. Although 14 dives were made on the wreck, at a depth of over 5,200 m (17,100 ft), no gold was recovered. A National Geographic crew consisting of director Mark Stouffer and director of photography Bill Mills and six others filmed the search for a National Geographic Special entitled Search for the Submarine I-52.
