= Mir (submersible) =

Self-propelled deep submergence vehicle

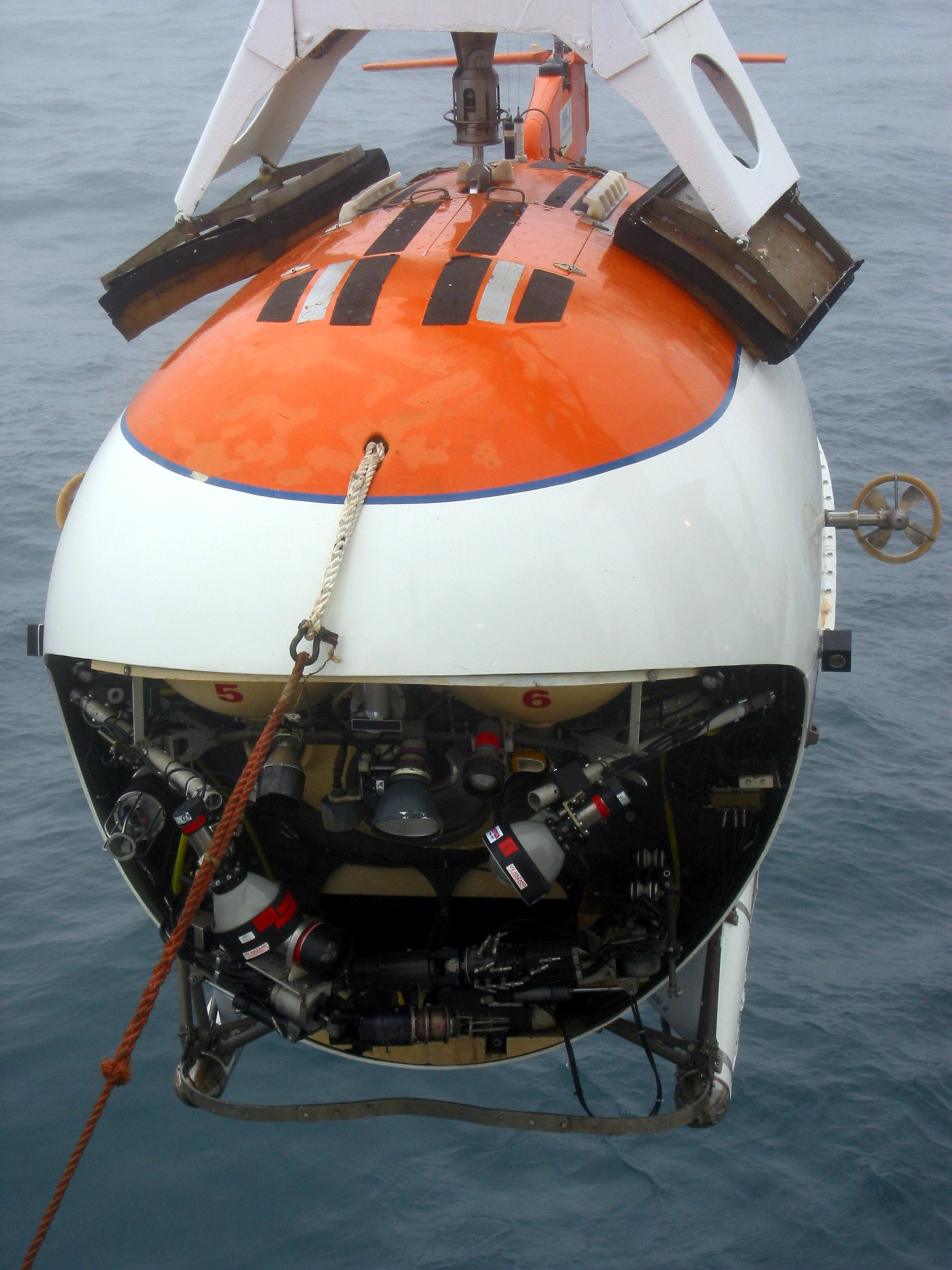
- Mir being lowered into the water by the crane on Akademik Mstislav Keldysh

History

Russia
- Name: Mir
- Builder: Rauma-Repola Oceanics / Lokomo, Finland
- Completed: 1987
- Decommissioned: 2017
- In service: 1987
- Status: Laid Up

General characteristics
- Type: Deep-submergence vehicle
- Displacement: 18.6 tons
- Length: 7.8 m (26 ft)
- Beam: 3.6 m (12 ft)
- Draft: 3.0 m (9.8 ft)
- Installed power: 9 kW electric motor
- Speed: 5 kn
- Test depth: 6,000 m (20,000 ft)
- Complement: 3

Mir (Russian: Мир, lit. 'world, peace') was a class of two self-propelled deep-submergence vehicles. The project was initially developed by the USSR Academy of Sciences (now the Russian Academy of Sciences) along with Lazurit Central Design Bureau, and two vehicles were ordered from Finland. The Mir-1 and Mir-2, delivered in 1987, were designed and built by the Finnish company Rauma-Repola's Oceanics subsidiary. The project was carried out under the supervision of constructors and engineers of the Shirshov Institute of Oceanology.

== Characteristics ==
The vessels are designed to be used for scientific research. They might also be used to assist in submarine rescue operations, although they do not have the capacity to take anybody aboard when underwater. The carrier and command centre of both Mir submersibles is the R/V Akademik Mstislav Keldysh. The two Mir units are operated by the Russian Academy of Sciences. Their military counterparts are the Konsul-class submersibles.

The Mir submersibles can dive to a maximum depth of 6,000 metres (19,685 ft).

Traditionally, the personnel sphere of a deep sea submersible is manufactured of titanium plates that are welded together. On Mir, the personnel sphere is made of a maraging steel alloy that has ten percent better strength/weight ratio than titanium. This alloy contains about 30% cobalt and smaller amounts of nickel, chrome and titanium. Two hemispheres were made by casting and machining, and then bolted together, thus avoiding welded joints. The resulting construction is close to the density of water, thus making it easier to move in different depths. Additional buoyancy is provided by 8 cubic metres (280 cu ft) of syntactic foam. Unlike other deep submergence vehicles that use iron ballast to reach the ocean floor, the buoyancy and depth is adjusted by ballast tanks.

- The Mir submersibles are 7.8 m long, 3.6 m wide, 3.0 m high, and weigh 18,600 kg (maximum payload is 290 kg). The personnel sphere's walls are 5 cm thick, and the inside diameter of the working area is 2.1 m. Three viewports are provided (viewport material is 18 cm thick): the forward-facing port is 20 cm diameter; the two side-facing ports are 12 cm diameter each.
- Power is provided by NiCad batteries of 100 kWh capacity. Electric motors drive hydraulic pumps to actuate hydraulic manipulators and three propulsors. The aft hydraulic propulsor is rated at 9 kW and 2 side propulsors are rated at 2.5 kW each. Maximum underwater speed is 5 knots.
- Longitudinal trim is controlled using two spherical water ballast tanks, fore and aft. Water can be forced out of these tanks as required by using compressed air.
- Air pressure inside the cabin remains at a constant one atmosphere: the air is recycled in a manner similar to that used on board spacecraft, with lithium hydroxide scrubbers removing accumulated carbon dioxide.
- VHF radio is used to maintain communication with the surface. The units contain imaging sonar units of 250 metre range, so nearby objects can be visualized and their distance measured. The distance to the seabed can also be accurately measured when nearing touchdown.
- The units' life-support systems have 246 man-hour capacity, or 3.42 days for a three-person crew.
- The units are designed for pressure at 6,000 metre depth, and have been tested to 125% of that pressure. In field testing, Mir-1 descended to 6,170 m and Mir-2 descended to 6,120 m.
- Originally the hydraulic manipulators were covered by a helmet-like retractable see-through visor, but these were removed in a major overhaul in 1994.
- The submersibles change depth at a maximum vertical speed of 40 metres per minute, so several hours are required to travel to and from deep sites.

== Finnish-Soviet co-operation ==
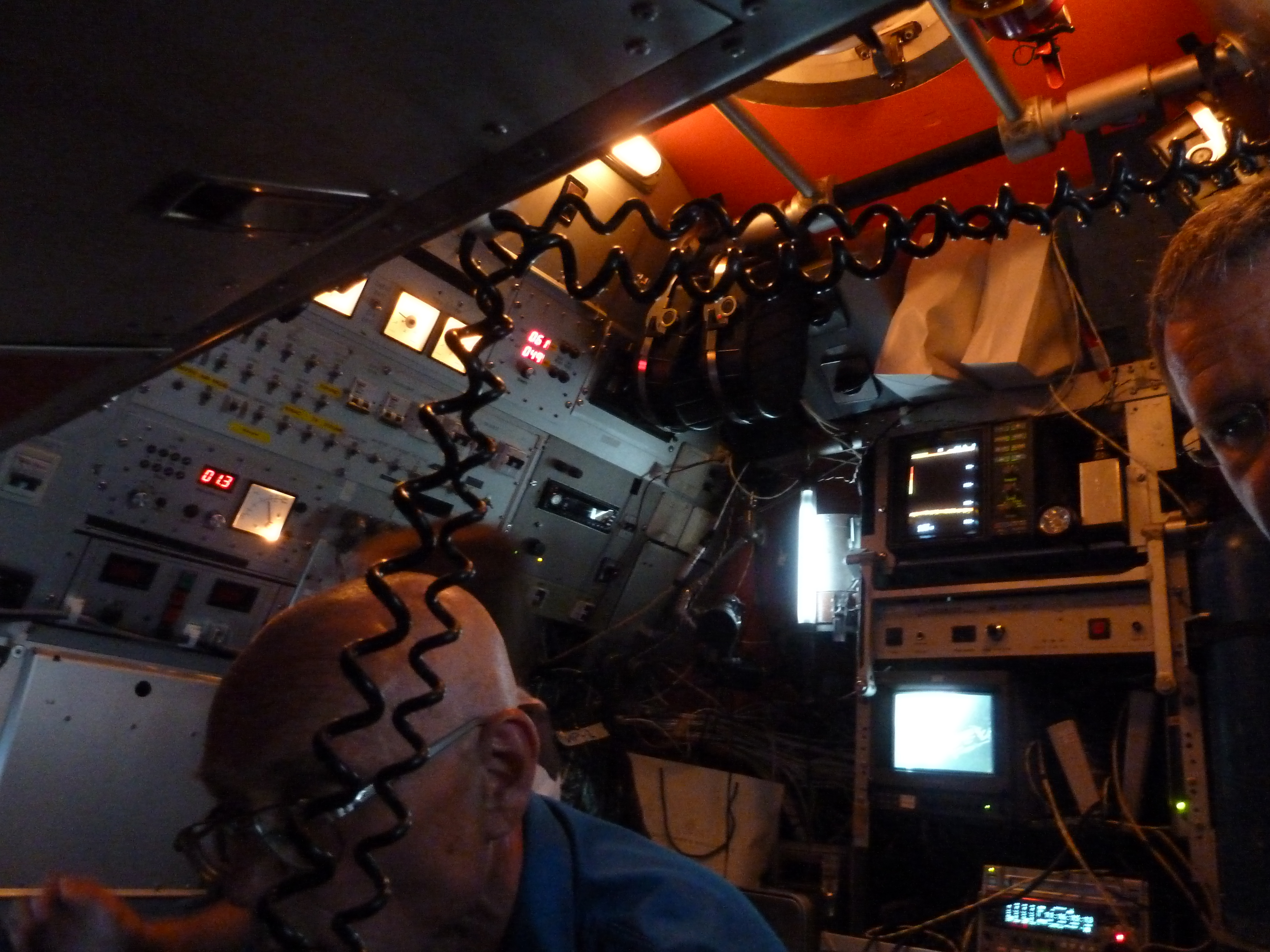
Interior of Mir-2

Production of the two Mir units was a prime example of Finnish-Soviet economic and technical co-operation during the Cold War.

The technical specification for the creation of the devices was prepared by the head of the Department of Deep-sea Habitable Vehicles of the Institute of Oceanology of the USSR Academy of Sciences, project manager Igor Mikhaltsev. The main ideas on the design of the submarines, the arrangement of its individual systems, nodes, elements, and the acquisition of scientific and navigation equipment belong to I. E. Mikhaltsev, his deputy A.M. Sagalevich and the chief engineer of the project from the Finnish shipbuilding company Sauli Ruohonen, who headed a group of Finnish engineers and technicians who participated in the construction of the submarines.

Bids from Canada, France and Sweden to construct the submarines had been retracted most likely due to political pressure. In a later interview with STT the then Rauma-Repola department head Peter Laxell said he believed that "Finland got the permit to deliver the crafts to the Soviets on the basis that the CoCom officials in the USA believed the project would be a failure ... Once it became clear to them we actually had accomplished the engineering feat there was a huge uproar about how such technology could be sold to the Soviets, enough for many visits to the Pentagon."

Because of the CoCom restrictions, most of the technology used had to be developed in Finland. The electronics was developed by Hollming. The syntactic foam was produced in Finland by Exel Oyj, as 3M, the leading producer, refused to supply their product. The construction, including casting, was done by Lokomo (a Rauma-Repola subsidiary) in Tampere, Finland.

The level of technology flowing into the Soviet Union raised concern in the US and Rauma-Repola was privately threatened with economic sanctions. For example, one concern of the Pentagon was the possibility that the Soviet Union would manufacture a pioneer submarine fleet that could clear the ocean floor of US deep sea listening equipment. With the possibility of losing its lucrative offshore oil platforms market Rauma-Repola yielded, and submarine development ceased in Finland. One project that was abandoned was the development of a fuel cell based air-independent propulsion system.

The 122 m length support vessel R/V Akademik Mstislav Keldysh was also built in Finland, at the Hollming shipyard in Rauma in 1980 (later operated by STX Finland, closed in 2014).

== Expeditions ==
=== Search for the submarine I-52 ===
In 1998 the Mirs were utilized in the filming and photography of the sunken Japanese submarine I-52 for a National Geographic television special and a magazine article. Aboard the Russian R/V Keldysh for over five weeks in the mid-Atlantic, the film crew documented the search by treasure seeker Paul Tidwell for the alleged two tons of gold that was on the I-52's cargo manifest.

Director of photography William Mills and National Geographic photographer Jonathan Blair made multiple dives in Mir-1 and Mir-2 alongside their Russian pilots Anatoly Sagalevich in Mir-1 and Yevgeny Chernyaev in Mir-2, to a depth of 5240 metres, a mile and a half deeper than the Titanic wreck. Although no gold was ever recovered, the expedition was documented in a National Geographic television special, Search for the Submarine I-52.

The earlier discovery of the wreck was made possible through the work of Tom Detweller and David W. Jourdan and their team at Nauticos, LLC. Mills would join the Nauticos team in 2001 in their ongoing efforts to locate Amelia Earhart's Lockheed L10-E aircraft in the Pacific.

=== Titanic and Bismarck filming ===
In the mid-1990s and early 2000s, the Mir vehicles were used by Canadian film director James Cameron to film the wreck of the RMS Titanic, resting at a depth of 3,821 metres, for his 1997 film Titanic and documentaries such as Ghosts of the Abyss, and to film the wreck of the German battleship Bismarck, resting at a depth of 4,700 metres, for his 2002 documentary film Expedition: Bismarck.

=== 2000 RMS Titanic Inc. expedition ===
In 2000 RMS Titanic Inc. co-founder G. Michael Harris served as expedition leader. He conducted over 120 hours on the wreck of the Titanic and made eleven dives in the expedition, utilizing both Mir-1 and Mir-2. Record of this expedition was made by artist Roger Bansemer in his book Journey to Titanic. Artifacts gathered from this exhibition are on display at Titanic: The Artifact Exhibition in Orlando, Florida, the largest Titanic exhibition in the world.

=== 2005 Private Titanic expedition ===
In 2005 an unnamed expedition to the Titanic was made. The expedition is documented in an hour and fourteen minute video by artist Roger Bansemer. The expedition left from St. John's, Newfoundland aboard the Keldysh. On June 12, 2017, a part of the expedition aired on PBS series Painting and Travel with Roger and Sarah Bansemer in episode 12, Journey to Titanic.

=== 2007 North Pole submersion ===
On August 2, 2007, Russia used the Mir submersibles to perform the first manned descent to the seabed under the Geographic North Pole, to a depth of 4,261 m, to scientifically research the region in relation to the 2001 Russian territorial claim. The Mir-1 crew: pilot Anatoly Sagalevich; polar explorer Arthur Chilingarov; and Vladimir Gruzdev. The Mir-2 crew were international: Russian pilot Yevgeny Chernyaev; Australian Mike McDowell; Swede Frederik Paulsen.

On the seabed Mir-1 planted a one-metre-tall rustproof flag of Russia, made of titanium alloy at OKB "Fakel" in Kaliningrad, and left a time capsule, containing a message for future generations and a flag of United Russia. "If a hundred or a thousand years from now someone goes down to where we were, they will see the Russian flag there", said Chilingarov Soil and water samples of the seabed were taken during the mission. International scepticism regarding the Russian mission was put forward by Peter MacKay, Canada's foreign minister, and Tom Casey, deputy spokesman of the US State Department, who argued that Russian claim of the Arctic has no legal standing.

==== Mistaken controversy ====
A short time after announcement of the polar expedition, some newspapers tried to stir up controversy by claiming the expedition was fake because some of the footage was from James Cameron's movie Titanic. A Russian television network had used the Titanic footage (for which it holds the copyright) as an illustration of the deep-sea vessels in action. They had shown this hours before the Mir submersibles had arrived on the Arctic seabed, and they had pointed out that the footage was from the movie, not a transmission from the site. Reuters did not note this information when it carried the story, and used the pictures wrongly captioned. Reuters later apologized and issued a statement reading in part: "Reuters mistakenly identified this file footage as originating from the Arctic, and not the North Atlantic where the footage was shot", and they reposted the story with correct captions.

=== 2008–2010 Expedition to Lake Baikal ===
In July 2008 both Mir submersibles began a two-year expedition to Lake Baikal, the world's largest freshwater lake. The expedition is being led by the Russian Academy of Sciences. The group's mission chief said that a total of 60 dives were planned. On July 29, the Mir-1 and Mir-2 submersibles reached the bottom of Lake Baikal, making the 1.05-mile (1,690 m) descent. On August 1, Russian Prime Minister Vladimir Putin accompanied the dive in the southern portion of the lake.

=== 2011 Lake Geneva exploration ===
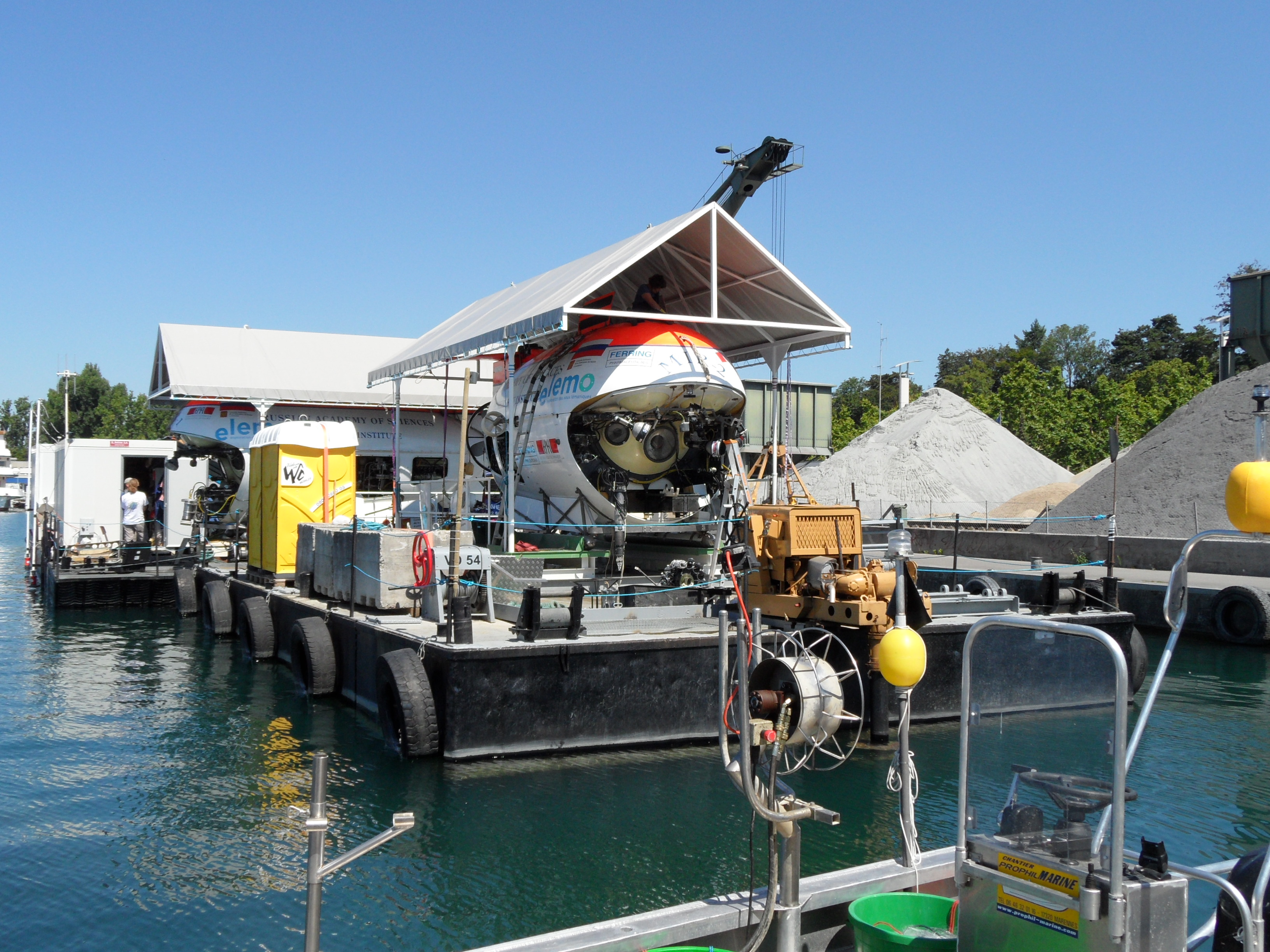
The Mirs at Lake Geneva in July 2011

In 2011, both submersibles were part of a scientific exploration program in Lake Geneva called elemo (exploration des eaux lémaniques), in which researchers conducted studies in areas such as bacteriology and micropollutants, as well as exploring Lake Geneva's geology and physics. The submersibles arrived on Lake Geneva in May 2011.

== Current status ==
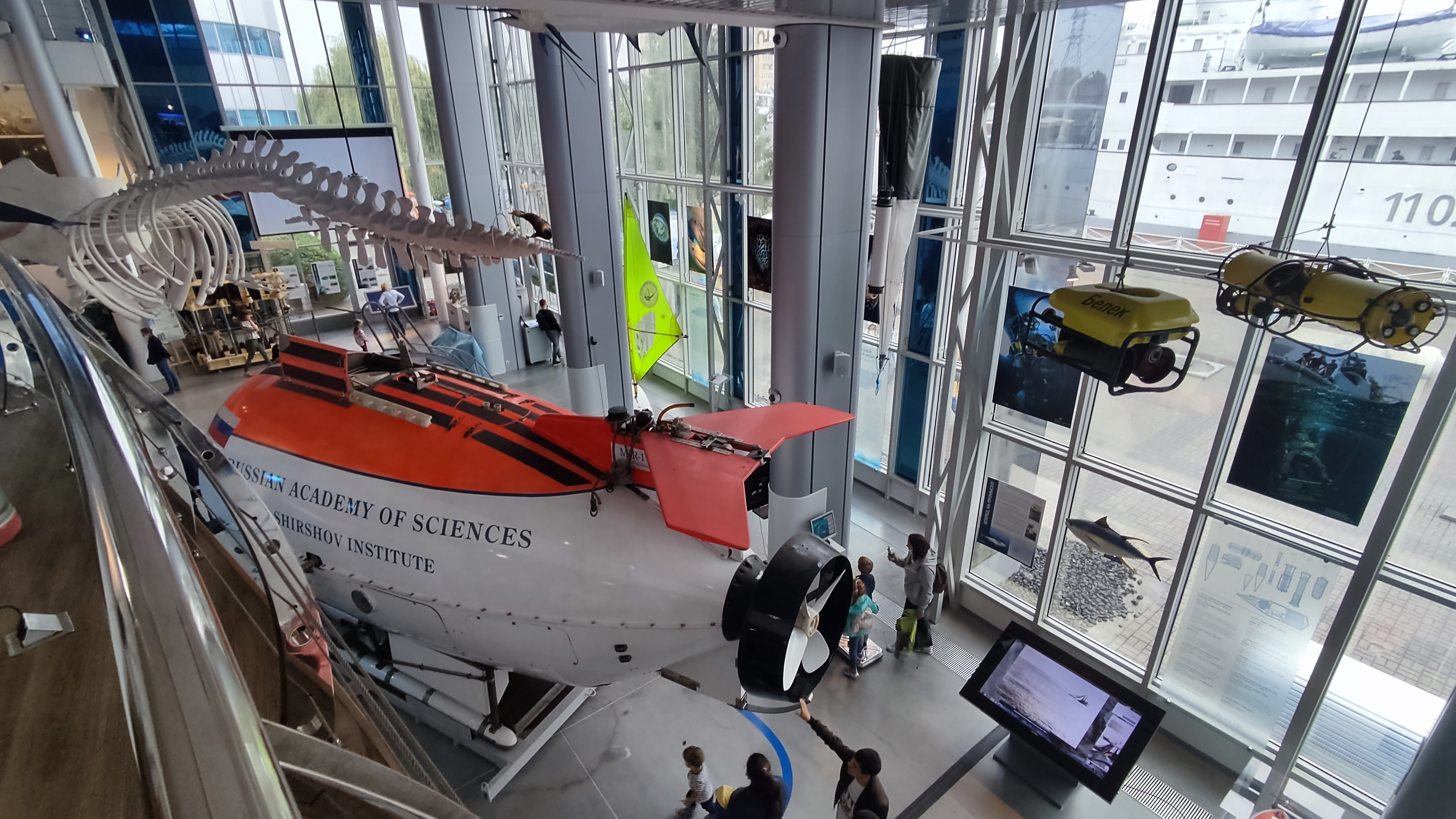
Mir-1 at the Museum of the World Ocean, Kalinigrad

The Mir-1 is currently on display at the Museum of the World Ocean in Kaliningrad and the Mir-2 at the Atlantic Division of Shirshov Institute of Oceanology in Kaliningrad, from where, upon completion of the new building of the Institute of Oceanology at Nakhimovsky Prospekt in Moscow, it will be moved to the museum of the Institute to be established there.

== Notable pilots ==
- Anatoly Sagalevich
- Pekka Laakso, the first pilot to reach 6170 metres.

== See also ==
- Finnish maritime cluster – Cluster of Finnish companies in maritime industries
- Underwater glider – Type of autonomous underwater vehicle
- DSV Alvin
- DSV Shinkai 6500
- DSV Sea Cliff

== Literature ==
- Anatoly M. Sagalevich: 25th Anniversary of the Deep Manned Submersibles Mir-1 and Mir-2. Oceanography 52, 2012, doi:10.1134/S0001437012060100 (free full text).
