= Territorial claims in the Arctic =

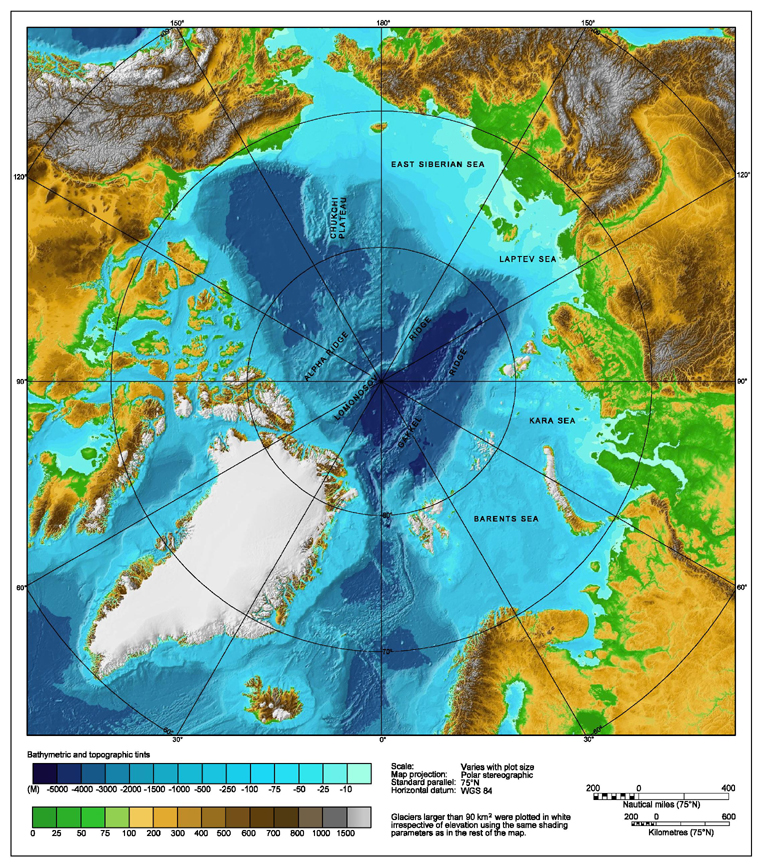
Arctic topography and bathymetry

The Arctic consists of land, internal waters, territorial seas, exclusive economic zones (EEZs) and international waters above the Arctic Circle (66 degrees 33 minutes North latitude). All land, internal waters, territorial seas and EEZs in the Arctic are under the jurisdiction of one of the eight Arctic coastal states: Canada, Denmark (via Greenland), Finland, Iceland, Norway, Russia, Sweden and the United States. International law regulates this area as with other portions of Earth.

Under international law, the North Pole and the region of the Arctic Ocean surrounding it are not owned by any country. The sovereignty of the five surrounding Arctic countries is governed by three maritime zones as outlined in the United Nations Convention on the Law of the Sea:

1. Territorial Sea: This zone extends 12 nautical miles (22 km; 14 mi) from the baseline of a coastal state. Within this area, the state exercises full sovereignty over the airspace, waters, and seabed. However, there is an exception for the right of innocent passage, which allows foreign vessels to traverse through this zone.

2. Contiguous Zone: Extending 24 nautical miles from the baseline, this zone provides a state with limited rights to enforce certain laws and regulations pertaining to customs, fiscal matters, immigration, and sanitary control, as well as to uphold international law.

3. Exclusive Economic Zone (EEZ): This zone extends up to 200 nautical miles (370 km; 230 mi) from the baseline. In the EEZ, the coastal state has the exclusive rights to explore and exploit natural resources found in the water column and on or under the seabed. Moreover, UNCLOS provides Arctic countries with special prerogatives. Art. 234 of the convention, the "Arctic exception" (also known as "the Canadian Clause") allows states to unilaterally apply special measures to protect the local environment and prevent vessel-source pollution when the territory in their EEZ is covered with ice for most of the year. However, the article requires scientific evidence to support the decision and states that these rules must not discriminate against foreign vessels.

The waters and sea bottom that is not confirmed to be extended continental shelf beyond the exclusive economic zones are considered to be the "heritage of all mankind". Fisheries in these waters can only be limited by international treaty. Exploitation of mineral resources on and below the seabed in these areas is administered by the UN International Seabed Authority.

Upon ratification of the United Nations Convention on the Law of the Sea (UNCLOS), a country has a ten-year period to make claims to an extended continental shelf which, if validated, gives it exclusive rights to resources on or below the seabed of that extended shelf area. Norway, Russia, Canada, and Denmark launched projects to provide a basis for seabed claims on extended continental shelves beyond their exclusive economic zones. The United States has signed, but not yet ratified the UNCLOS.

The status of certain portions of the Arctic sea region is in dispute for various reasons. Canada, Denmark, Norway, Russia, and the United States all regard parts of the Arctic seas as national waters (territorial waters out to 12 nautical miles (22 km)) or internal waters. There also are disputes regarding what passages constitute international seaways and rights to passage along them. There was one single disputed piece of land in the Arctic in the 21st century—Hans Island—which was disputed until 2022 (known as the Whisky War) between Canada and Denmark because of its location in the middle of a strait.

== North Pole and the Arctic Ocean ==
=== National sectors: 1925–2005 ===
In 1925, based upon the sector principle, Canada became the first country to extend its maritime boundaries northward to the North Pole, at least on paper, between 60°W and 141°W longitude, a claim that is not universally recognized (there are 415 nmi (769 km; 478 mi) of ocean between the Pole and Canada's northernmost land point). On April 15 the following year, the Presidium of the Supreme Soviet of the USSR declared the territory between two lines (32°04′35″E to 168°49′30″W) drawn from west of Murmansk to the North Pole and from the eastern Chukchi Peninsula to the North Pole to be Soviet territory. Norway (5°E to 35°E) made similar sector claims, as did the United States (170°W to 141°W), but that sector contained only a few islands, so the claim was not pressed. Denmark's sovereignty over all of Greenland was recognized by the United States in 1916 and by an international court in 1933. Denmark could also conceivably claim an Arctic sector (60°W to 10°W).

In the context of the Cold War, Canada sent Inuit families to the far north in the High Arctic relocation, partly to establish territoriality. The Canadian monarch, Queen Elizabeth II, accompanied by the Duke of Edinburgh, Prince Charles, and Princess Anne, undertook in 1970 a tour of Northern Canada, in part to demonstrate to an unconvinced American government and the Soviet Union that Canada had certain claim to its Arctic territories, which were strategic during the Cold War. In addition, Canada claims the water within the Canadian Arctic Archipelago as its own internal waters. The United States is one of the countries which does not recognize Canada's, or any other countries', Arctic archipelagic water claims and has allegedly sent nuclear submarines under the ice near Canadian islands without requesting permission.

Until 1999, the geographic North Pole (a non-dimensional dot) and the major part of the Arctic Ocean had been generally considered to comprise international space, including both the waters and the sea bottom. However, the adoption of the United Nations Convention on the Law of the Sea (UNCLOS) has prescribed a process which prompted several countries to submit claims or to reinforce pre-existing claims to portions of the seabed of the polar region.

=== Extended continental shelf claims: 2006–present ===
==== Overview ====
As defined by the UNCLOS, states have ten years from the date of ratification to make claims to an extended continental shelf. They must present to the Commission on the Limits of the Continental Shelf, a UN body, geological evidence that their shelf effectively extends beyond the 200 nautical miles limit but no more than an additional 150 nautical miles or 100 nautical miles from the 2500-meter isobath, depending on which method the state chooses. The Commission does not define borders but merely judges the scientific validity of assertions and it is up to countries with rightful but overlapping claims to come to a settlement. On this basis, four of the five states fronting the Arctic Ocean – Canada, Denmark, Norway, and the Russian Federation – must have made any desired claims by 2013, 2014, 2006, and 2007 respectively. Since the U.S. has yet to ratify the UNCLOS, the date for its submission is undetermined at this time.

Claims to extended continental shelves, if deemed valid, give the claimant state exclusive rights to the sea bottom and resources below the bottom. Valid extended continental shelf claims do not and cannot extend a state's Exclusive Economic Zone (EEZ) since the EEZ is determined solely by drawing a 200-nautical-mile (370 km) line using territorial sea baselines as their starting point. Press reports often confuse the facts and assert that extended continental shelf claims expand a state's EEZ thereby giving a state exclusive rights to resources not only on the sea bottom or below it, but also to those in the water column above it. The Arctic chart prepared by Durham University explicitly illustrates the extent of the uncontested Exclusive Economic Zones of the five states bordering the Arctic Ocean, and also the relatively small expanse of remaining "high seas" or totally international waters at the very North of the planet.

==== Specific nations ====
===== Canada =====
External image
- Map identifying baselines and territorial sea in the Canadian Arctic islands; retrieved 25 March 2017

Canada ratified UNCLOS on 7 November 2003 and had through 2013 to file its claim to an extended continental shelf. As of December 2013, Canada had announced that it would file a claim which includes the North Pole. Canada planned to submit their claim to a portion of the Arctic continental shelf in 2018.

In response to the Russian Arktika 2007 expedition, Canada's Foreign Affairs Minister, Peter MacKay, said "[t]his is posturing. This is the true North, strong and free, and they're fooling themselves if they think dropping a flag on the ocean floor is going to change anything... This isn't the 14th or 15th century". In response, Sergey Lavrov, the Russian Minister of Foreign Affairs, stated "[w]hen pioneers reach a point hitherto unexplored by anybody, it is customary to leave flags there. Such was the case on the Moon, by the way... [W]e from the outset said that this expedition was part of the big work being carried out under the UN Convention on the Law of the Sea, within the international authority where Russia's claim to submerged ridges which we believe to be an extension of our shelf is being considered. We know that this has to be proved. The ground samples that were taken will serve the work to prepare that evidence".

On 25 September 2007, Prime Minister Stephen Harper said he was assured by Russian president Vladimir Putin that neither offence nor "violation of international understanding or any Canadian sovereignty" was intended. Harper promised to defend Canada's claimed sovereignty by building and operating up to eight Arctic patrol ships, a new army training centre in Resolute Bay, and the refurbishing of an existing deepwater port at a former mining site in Nanisivik.

===== Denmark =====
External images
- Area of the Greenland continental shelf in the Arctic Ocean beyond 200-nautical-mile zone – borders of the 200 mile zone are marked in red, territory claimed by Denmark is shaded
- Delineation points

Denmark ratified UNCLOS on 16 November 2004 and had through 2014 to file a claim to an extended continental shelf.

The Kingdom of Denmark simultaneously declared that ratifying UNCLOS did not change Denmark's position that the Danish Straits including the Great Belt, the Little Belt, and the Danish part of Øresund, formed on the foundation of the Copenhagen Treaty of 1857 are legally Danish territory, and – as set out in the treaty section of the United Nations Office of Legal Affairs – this should remain so. Consequently, Denmark considers the Copenhagen Convention to apply solely to the waterways through Denmark proper and not the North Atlantic.

Greenland, an autonomous territory within the Kingdom of Denmark, has the nearest coastline to the North Pole, and Denmark argues that the Lomonosov Ridge is in fact an extension of Greenland. Danish project included LORITA-1 expedition in April–May 2006 and included tectonic research during LOMROG expedition, which were part of the 2007–2008 International Polar Year program. It comprised the Swedish icebreaker Oden and Russian nuclear icebreaker NS 50 Let Pobedy. The latter led the expedition through the ice fields to the research location. Further efforts at geological study in the region were carried out by the LOMROG II expedition, which took place in 2009, and the LOMROG III expedition, launched in 2012.

On 14 December 2014 Denmark claimed an area of 895,000 km^{2} (346,000 sq mi) extending from Greenland past the North Pole to the limits of the Russian Exclusive Economic Zone. Unlike the Russian claim which is generally limited to the Russia sector of the Arctic, the Danish Claim extends across the North Pole and into Russia's sector.

===== Norway =====
Norway ratified the UNCLOS on 24 June 1996 and had through 2006 to file a claim to an extended continental shelf.

On November 27, 2006, Norway made an official submission into the UN Commission on the Limits of the Continental Shelf in accordance with the United Nations Convention on the Law of the Sea (article 76, paragraph 8). There are provided arguments to extend the Norwegian seabed claim beyond the 200 nmi (370 km; 230 mi) EEZ in three areas of the northeastern Atlantic and the Arctic: the "Loop Hole" in the Barents Sea, the Western Nansen Basin in the Arctic Ocean, and the "Banana Hole" in the Norwegian Sea. The submission also states that an additional submission for continental shelf limits in other areas may be posted later.

Norway and Russia have ratified an agreement on the Barents Sea, ending a 40-year demarcation dispute.

===== Russia =====
Russia ratified the UNCLOS in 1997 and had through 2007 to file a claim to an extended continental shelf.

The Russian Federation is claiming a large extended continental shelf as far as the North Pole based on the Lomonosov Ridge and Mendeleyev Ridges within their Arctic sector. Moscow believes the eastern Lomonosov Ridge and the Mendeleyev Ridge are an extension of the Siberian continental shelf. Until Denmark filed its claim, the Russian claim did not cross the Russia-US Arctic sector demarcation line, nor did it extend into the Arctic sector of any other Arctic coastal state.

On December 20, 2001, Russia made an official submission into the UN Commission on the Limits of the Continental Shelf in accordance with the United Nations Convention on the Law of the Sea (article 76, paragraph 8). In the document it is proposed to establish the outer limits of the continental shelf of Russia beyond the 200-nautical-mile (370 km) Exclusive Economic Zone, but within the Russian Arctic sector. The territory claimed by Russia in the submission is a large portion of the Arctic within its sector, extending to but not beyond the geographic North Pole. One of the arguments was a statement that Lomonosov Ridge, an underwater mountain ridge passing near the Pole, and Mendeleev Ridge on the Russian side of the Pole are extensions of the Eurasian continent. In 2002 the UN Commission neither rejected nor accepted the Russian proposal, recommending additional research.

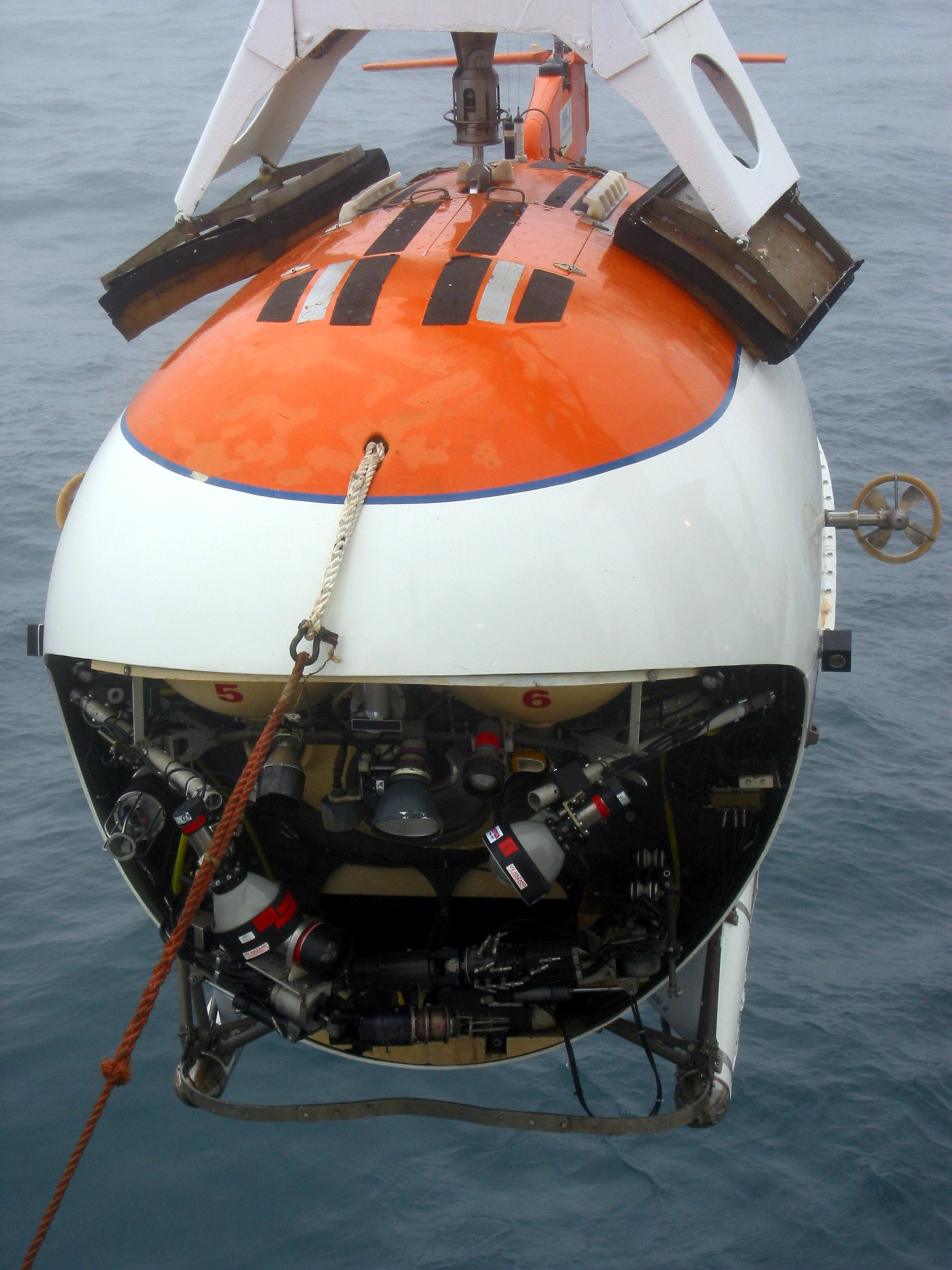
MIR submersible

On August 2, 2007, a Russian expedition called Arktika 2007, composed of six explorers led by Artur Chilingarov, employing MIR submersibles, for the first time in history descended to the seabed at the North Pole. There they planted a Russian flag and took water and soil samples for analysis, continuing a mission to provide additional evidence related to the Russian extended continental shelf claim including the mineral riches of the Arctic. This was part of the ongoing 2007 Russian North Pole expedition within the program of the 2007–2008 International Polar Year.

The expedition aimed to establish that the eastern section of seabed passing close to the Pole, known as the Lomonosov and Mendeleyev Ridges, is in fact an extension of Russia's landmass. The expedition came as several countries are trying to extend their rights over sections of the Arctic Ocean floor. Both Norway and Denmark are carrying out surveys to this end. Vladimir Putin made a speech on a nuclear icebreaker on 3 May 2007, urging greater efforts to secure Russia's "strategic, economic, scientific and defense interests" in the Arctic.

In mid-September 2007, Russia's Natural Resources Ministry issued a statement:

Preliminary results of an analysis of the earth crust model examined by the Arktika 2007 expedition, obtained on September 20, have confirmed that the crust structure of the Lomonosov Ridge corresponds to the world analogues of the continental crust, and it is therefore part of the Russian Federation's adjacent continental shelf.

Viktor Posyolov, an official with Russia's Agency for Management of Mineral Resources:

With a high degree of likelihood, Russia will be able to increase its continental shelf by 1.2 million square kilometers [460,000 square miles] with potential hydrocarbon reserves of not less than 9,000 to 10,000 billion tonnes of conventional fuel beyond the 200-mile (320 km) [322 kilometer] economic zone in the Arctic Ocean

On August 4, 2015, Russia submitted additional data in support of its bid, containing new arguments based on "ample scientific data collected in years of Arctic research", for territories in the Arctic to the United Nations. Through this bid, Russia is claiming 1.2 million square kilometers (over 463,000 square miles) of Arctic sea shelf extending more than 350 nautical miles (about 650 kilometers) from the shore. In February 2016 additional data was submitted by Russian Minister of Natural Resources and Environment Sergey Donskoy. After the expedition "Arktika 2007" Russian researchers collected new data reinforcing Russia's claim to part of the sea bottom beyond its uncontested 200-mile Exclusive Economic Zone (EEZ) within its Arctic sector, the North Pole area included. On August 9, 2016, the UN Commission on the Limits of the Continental Shelf began its review of the submission.

In 2021, the Russian Federation submitted several addenda to the CLCS extending the area claimed as part of its extended continental shelf. One submission extended its shelf claim across the Lomonosov Ridge up to the outer limit of Canada and Denmark's EEZ. This area overlaps completely with Danish and Canadian claims. Moscow also extended its shelf on the Gakkel Ridge, part of which overlaps with Danish claims.

In 2023, the CLCS agreed with most of Russia's claims granting them rights to delineate their continental shelf based on the Mendeleev-Alpha Rise, the Podvodnikov Basin, and the Lomonosov Ridge as parts of the Asian continental shelf. However, the CLCS did not recognise the Gakkel Ridge, contested by Russia and Denmark, as part of Russia's Continental Shelf.

===== United States =====
As of 2023, the United States has not ratified the UN Convention on the Law of the Sea (UNCLOS). However, the United States points out that a coastal state's right to an extended continental shelf is well established in customary international law, so US rights do not depend on joining UNCLOS or making submissions to the CLCS. The absence of the United States from the UNCLOS system means that it is not bound by the convention's articles. As a result, the US is not required to participate in the revenue-sharing system established by Article 82 of the convention.

In August 2007, an American Coast Guard icebreaker, the USCGC Healy, traveled to the Arctic Ocean to map the sea floor off Alaska. Larry Mayer, director of the Center for Coastal and Ocean Mapping at the University of New Hampshire, stated the trip had been planned for months, having nothing to do with the Russians planting their flag. The purpose of the mapping work aboard the Healy is to determine the extent of the US continental shelf north of Alaska.

=== Future ===
It was stated by the Intergovernmental Panel on Climate Change on March 25, 2007, that riches are awaiting the shipping industry due to Arctic climate change. This economic sector could be transformed similar to the way the Middle East was by the Suez Canal in the 19th century. There will be a race among nations for oil, fish, diamonds and shipping routes, accelerated by the impact of global warming.

However, much research commentary since 2008 has thrown cold water on narratives that the Arctic will experience a rush for resources that could lead to conflict between states.

The potential value of the North Pole and the surrounding area resides not so much in shipping itself but in the possibility that lucrative petroleum and natural gas reserves exist below the seafloor. Such reserves are known to exist under the Barents, Kara, and Beaufort Seas. However, the vast majority of the Arctic known to contain gas and oil resources is already within uncontested EEZs. While these EEZs leave much of the Central Arctic Ocean high seas, Canada, Russia, Denmark (via Greenland), and Norway have all announced extended continental shelf claims that cover almost the entire Arctic seabed. This would mean that legal rights to oil, gas, and other resources in and on the seabed would belong exclusively to the Arctic coastal states, which would have sole jurisdiction to manage their resources.

On September 14, 2007, the European Space Agency reported ice loss had opened up the Northwest Passage "for the first time since records began in 1978", and the extreme loss in 2007 rendered the passage "fully navigable". Further exploration for petroleum reserves elsewhere in the Arctic may now become more feasible, and the passage may become a regular channel of international shipping and commerce if Canada is not able to enforce its claim to it.

Foreign Ministers and other officials representing Canada, Denmark, Norway, Russia, and the United States met in Ilulissat, Greenland in May 2008, at the Arctic Ocean Conference and announced the Ilulissat Declaration. Among other things the declaration stated that any demarcation issues in the Arctic should be resolved on a bilateral basis between contesting parties.

== Hans Island ==
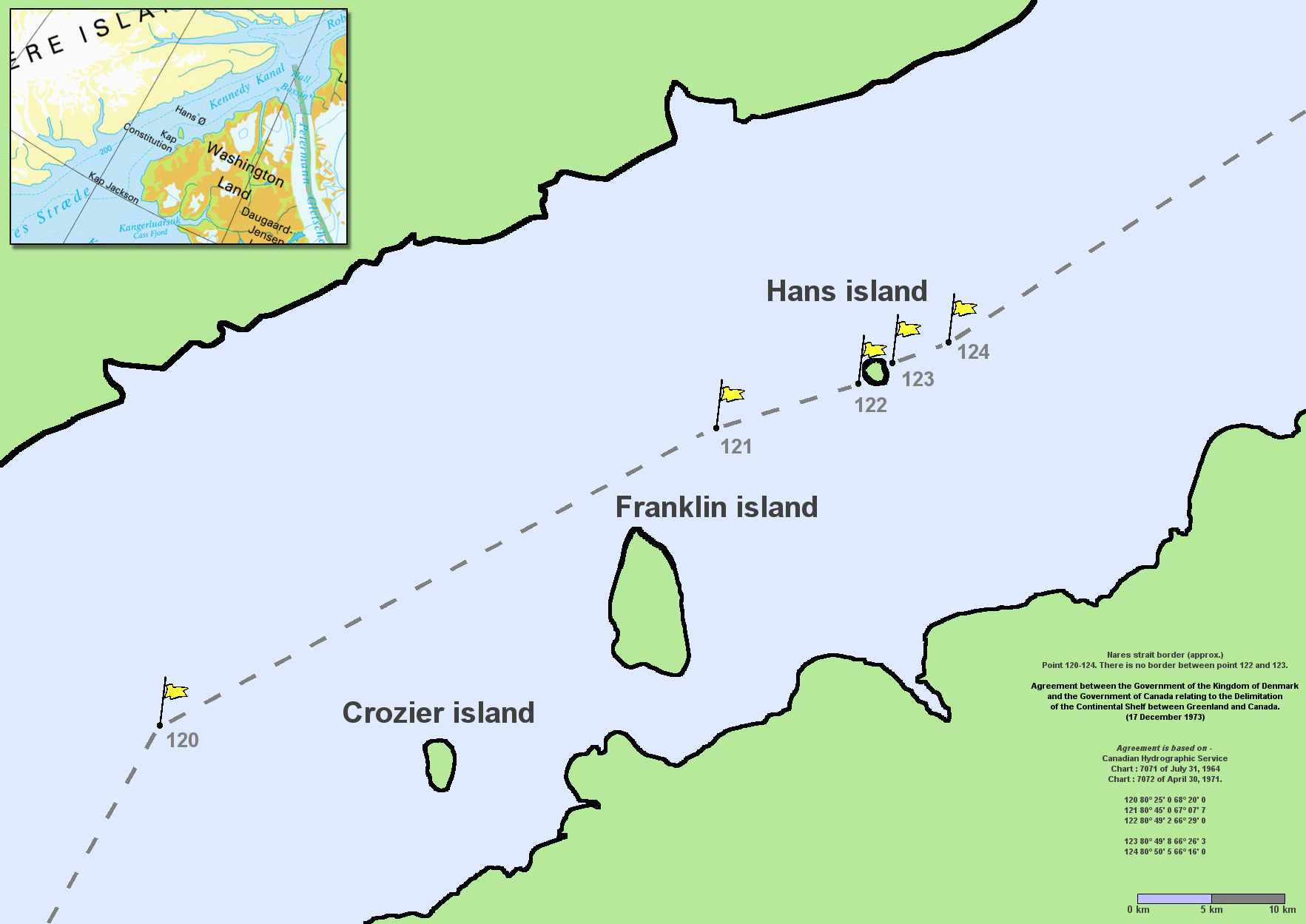
Map of part of Kennedy Channel, with the formerly disputed island

Hans Island is situated in the Nares Strait, a waterway that runs between Ellesmere Island (the northernmost part of Nunavut, Canada) and Greenland. The small uninhabited island, sized 1.3 km^{2} (0.5 sq mi), was named for Greenlandic Arctic traveller Hans Hendrik.

In 1973, Canada and Denmark negotiated the geographic coordinates of the continental shelf, and settled on a delimitation treaty that was ratified by the United Nations on December 17, 1973, and has been in force since March 13, 1974. The treaty lists 127 points (by latitude and longitude) from Davis Strait to the end of Robeson Channel, where Nares Strait runs into Lincoln Sea; the border is defined by geodesic lines between these points. The treaty does not, however, draw a line from point 122 (80°49′2″N 66°29′0″W) to point 123 (80°49′8″N 66°26′3″W)—a distance of 875 m (0.54 mi). Hans Island is situated in the centre of this area.

Danish flags were planted on Hans Island in 1984, 1988, 1995 and 2003. The Canadian government formally protested these actions. In July 2005, former Canadian defence minister Bill Graham made an unannounced stop on Hans Island during a trip to the Arctic; this launched yet another diplomatic quarrel between the governments, and a truce was called that September.

Canada had claimed Hans Island was clearly in its territory, as topographic maps originally used in 1967 to determine the island's coordinates clearly showed the entire island on Canada's side of the delimitation line. However, federal officials reviewed the latest satellite imagery in July 2007, and conceded that the line went roughly through the middle of the island. This left ownership of the island disputed, with claims over fishing grounds and future access to the Northwest Passage possibly at stake as well.

As of April 2012, the governments of both countries were in negotiations which ultimately resulted in the island being split almost precisely in half. The negotiations ended in November 2012 and gave a more exact border description, but did not solve the dispute over Hans Island. One possible resolution was to treat the island as a condominium.

In 2022, Canada and Denmark resolved the dispute, establishing a land border through Hans Island.

== Beaufort Sea ==
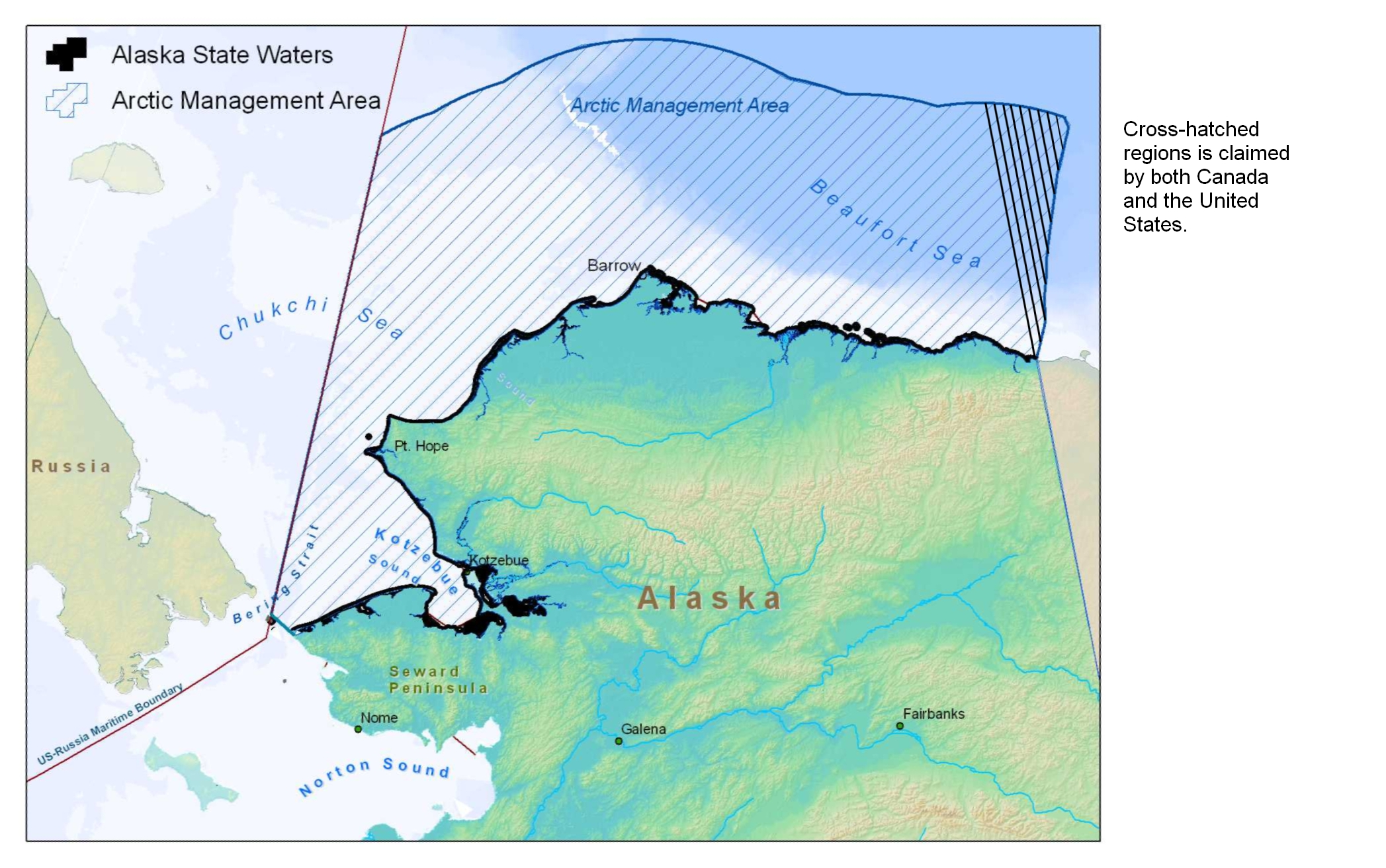
The cross-hatched wedge-shaped region in the east is claimed by both Canada and the United States.

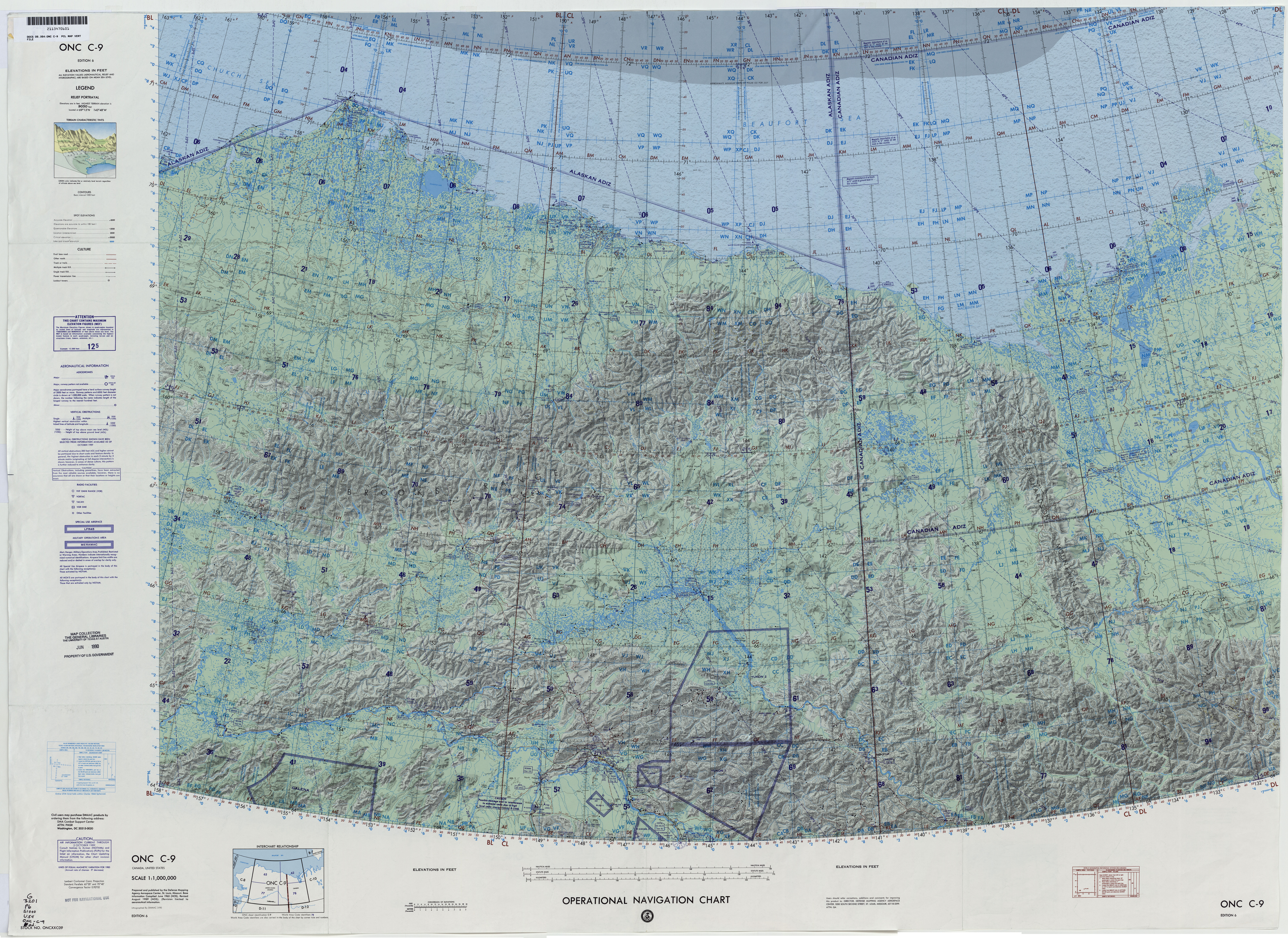
Map including the border area

There is an ongoing dispute involving a wedge-shaped slice on the International Boundary in the Beaufort Sea, between the Canadian territory of Yukon and the American state of Alaska.

The Canadian position is that the maritime boundary should extend the land boundary in a straight line, following the natural prolongation principle. The American position is that the maritime boundary should extend along a path equidistant from the coasts of the two nations, following the equidistance principle. The disputed area may hold significant hydrocarbon reserves. The U.S. has already leased eight plots of the terrain below the water to search for and possibly bring to market oil reserves that may exist there. Canada has protested diplomatically in response. The boundary could also effect the delimitation of the extended continental shelf in the Beaufort and Chukchi Seas: Ironically, each country's position within 200 nautical miles produces a line that favors the other state beyond 200 nautical miles.

No settlement has been reached to date.

On August 20, 2009 United States Secretary of Commerce Gary Locke announced a moratorium on fishing the Beaufort Sea north of Alaska, including the disputed waters. Randy Boswell, of Canada.com wrote that the disputed area covered a 21,436 square kilometres (8,276 mi^{2}) section of the Beaufort Sea (smaller than Israel, larger than El Salvador). He wrote that Canada had filed a "diplomatic note" with the United States in April when the US first announced plans for the moratorium.

== Northwest Passage ==
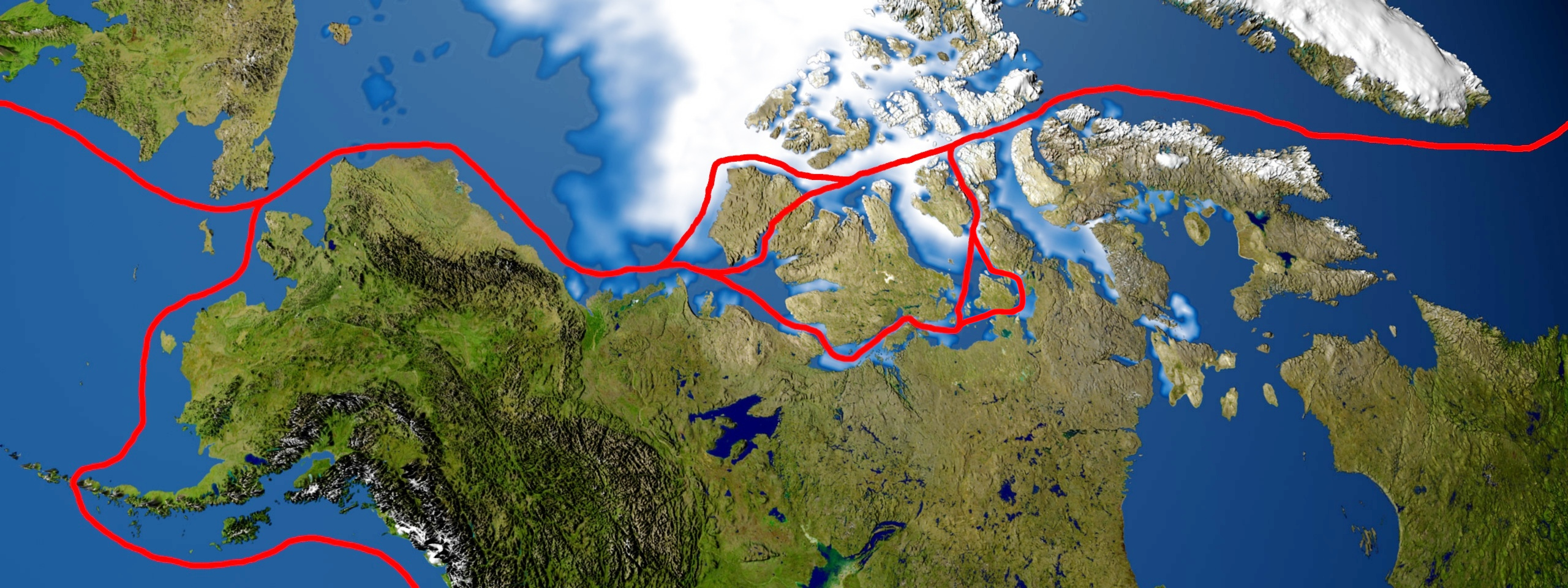
Northwest Passage routes

The legal status of the Northwest Passage is disputed: Canada considers it to be part of its historic internal waters. The United States and most maritime nations consider them to be an international strait, which means that foreign vessels have right of "transit passage". In such a regime, Canada would have the right to enact fishing and environmental regulation, and fiscal and smuggling laws, as well as laws intended for the safety of shipping, but not the right to close the passage. In addition, the environmental regulations allowed under the UNCLOS are not as robust as those allowed if the Northwest Passage is part of Canada's internal waters. Consequently, the Northwest Passage remains a significant geopolitical issue, as its potential opening could shorten the cargo sea route between Europe and the Far East by at least 4,000 nautical miles.

== Northeast Passage ==
Northeast Passage (blue) vs the traditional Suez Canal Route (red)

Russia considers portions of the Northern Sea Route, which encompasses only navigational routes through waters within Russia's Arctic EEZ east from Novaya Zemlya to the Bering Strait, to pass through Russian territorial and internal waters in the Kara, Vilkitskiy, and Sannikov Straits.The year-round navigability of the Northern Sea Route could reduce shipping costs from Europe to Asia by 50%. The Northeast passage currently (2025) is navigable by commercial shipping for approximately 2–4 months a year but by 2030 this route is expected to be navigable for 4–6.5 months a year.

== Arctic territories ==
=== Canada ===
- Arctic Archipelago
- Labrador
- Northwest Territories
- Nunavik
- Nunavut
- Yukon

=== Denmark ===
- Greenland

=== Iceland ===
- Grímsey

=== Norway ===
- Bear Island
- Finnmark
- Jan Mayen
- Svalbard

=== Russia ===
- Arkhangelsk Oblast
- Big Diomede (due to US Government definition of "Arctic", even though below Arctic Circle)
- Chukotka Autonomous Okrug
- Franz Josef Land
- Krasnoyarsk Krai (majority of territory south of the Arctic Circle)
- Murmansk Oblast
- Nenets Autonomous Okrug
- New Siberian Islands
- Novaya Zemlya
- Russian Arctic islands
- Sakha Republic (most of the Republic south of the Arctic Circle)
- Severnaya Zemlya (Russia)
- Siberia (Russia)
- Yamalo-Nenets Autonomous Okrug
- Wrangel Island

=== United States ===
- Alaska
- Aleutian Islands (due to the U.S. Government definition of "Arctic", even though below the Arctic Circle)
- Little Diomede Island (due to the U.S. Government definition of "Arctic", even though below the Arctic Circle)

=== Others ===
- Sápmi (Norway, Sweden, Finland and Russia)

== See also ==
- Arctic policy of Canada
- United States Outer Continental Shelf
- Outer Continental Shelf (in geography)
- List of Russian explorers
- Arctic policy of Russia
- Arctic Cooperation and Politics
- Norwegian continental shelf
- Arctic Council
- Canada–United States relations#Arctic disputes
- Continental shelf of Russia
- Territorial claims in Antarctica
- Natural resources of the Arctic
- Arctic resources race
