= Expedition: Bismarck =

- Directed by: James Cameron; Gary Johnstone
- Narrated by: Lance Henriksen
- Music by: Jeehun Hwang
- Country of origin: United States
- Original language: English

Production
- Producers: James Cameron; Andrew Wight
- Cinematography: Christopher Titus King; Vince Pace; D.J. Roller
- Running time: 92 min

Original release
- Network: Discovery Channel
- Release: December 8, 2002

Expedition: Bismarck is a 2002 documentary film produced for the Discovery Channel by Andrew Wight and James Cameron, directed by James Cameron and Gary Johnstone, and narrated by Lance Henriksen. The film follows an underwater expedition to the German Battleship Bismarck and digitally reconstructs events that led up to the ship's sinking during World War II. In 2003 the film was honored with an Emmy Award for Outstanding Sound Editing for Nonfiction Programming (Single or Multi-Camera).

== Synopsis ==
In World War II, German Battleship Bismarck sank after being unsuccessful in its attempt to escape from the Royal Navy, led by John Tovey. Discovered for the first time in 1989 by Robert Ballard, who had been known for discovering the Titanic, the Bismarck had been visited but one time since. James Cameron and a crew of historians search out the Bismarck in an attempt to answer many unsolved questions and search for the truth behind what happened to the ship, one of Germany's most powerful forces. With significant technological advancements, a forensics investigation into the Bismarck's wreckage is investigated, giving viewers an inside view to the lives of the soldiers at the time. The film uses revolutionary production techniques and offers high-definition shots of the Bismarck wreckage under the sea. It is a rare and incredible look into a deeply significant piece of history. This is the first chance that people will have to have a glance into what the ship was like for the first time since its sinking over 60 years ago.

== Production ==
Produced in partnership with The Discovery Channel, James Cameron and a crew of historians embarked on a trip to visit the wreckage of the german battleship Bismarck, west of Brest, France. The trip was accompanied by several survivors of the incident who relived their journey along the way. The documentary uses several reenactments throughout the film to give viewers a better idea of how the story took place. The film expanded on editing and digital graphics techniques to design reenactments that were as realistic as possible.

== Featured individuals ==
- Lance Henriksen (Narrator)
- James Cameron
- Karl Kuhn (Bismarck survivor)
- Heinz Steeg
- Walter Weintz (Bismarck survivor)
- Holger Herwig (Bismarck historian)
- Mike Cameron
- Adrian Paul DeGroot
- David J. Bercuson (Bismarck historian)
- Genya Chernaiev (MIR 2 pilot)
- Lori Johnston (Expedition scientist)

== Reception ==
The film was released in the USA on December 8, 2002, and was aired on the Discovery Channel. It was well received, and gave viewers a chance to see what Bismarck looked like and the impact it had during the war. Overall, the film generally gained positive feedback from both critics and audiences alike. The documentary was nominated for several awards and received an Emmy award in 2003 for Outstanding Sound Editing for Non-Fiction Programming.
