= List of films about the Titanic =

The Titanic has been featured in numerous films, TV movies and notable TV episodes. On television, the Titanic has been featured in genres ranging from epic dramas to short cartoon parodies.

== Theatrically released cinema dramas ==
Year	Title	Director	Cast	Notes
1912	Saved from The Titanic	Étienne Arnaud	Dorothy Gibson; Alec B. Francis	Co-written by and starring Titanic survivor Dorothy Gibson and released only 29 days after the ship sank. Now a lost film following a studio fire in which the last known prints were destroyed. Only a few production stills remain.
1912	La hantise	Louis Feuillade	Renée Carl; René Navarre	Also known as The Obsession, the film focuses on a woman who is told by a palm reader that one of her loved ones will die. The woman then tries to convince her husband not to board the Titanic, which is departing at Cherbourg.
1912	In Nacht und Eis	Mime Misu	Waldemar Hecker; Otto Rippert; Ernst Rückert	("In Night and Ice"), also called Der Untergang der Titanic ("The Sinking of the Titanic"). Silent film produced in Germany; believed to be lost, but was rediscovered in 1998 from a collector's copy.
1929	Atlantic / Atlantik / Atlantis	Ewald André Dupont	Franklin Dyall; Madeleine Carroll	A highly fictionalized account, retitled Titanic: Disaster in the Atlantic in American home video releases; the first sound film made about the disaster, and a pioneering sound-on-film release, being produced in three languages: English, German, and French (and silent versions). The German version was the first full-length German sound film and was a major hit there. It is believed to have been filmed aboard the White Star liner RMS Majestic. The title of the film, Atlantic, is also the name of the ship in the film, as the White Star Line refused to give the filmmakers permission to use the word Titanic in the film.
1933	Cavalcade	Frank Lloyd	Diana Wynyard; Clive Brook; Margaret Lindsay; John Warburton	This drama film was based on the eponymous play by Noël Coward. Two fictional main characters perish in the sinking.
1943	Titanic	Werner Klingler; Herbert Selpin	Sybille Schmitz; Hans Nielsen; E.F. Fürbringer	A 1943 German Nazi propaganda film (personally overseen by Joseph Goebbels) casting a fictitious German First Officer on the Titanic as the hero and the British as villains. The first film to use singularly the name Titanic and intermix fictional subplots and characters with historical persons on board the ship. Filmed on board the German liner SS Cap Arcona, which was later mistakenly sunk by the RAF with civilian loss of life greatly exceeding that of the Titanic.
1953	Titanic	Jean Negulesco	Clifton Webb; Barbara Stanwyck; Robert Wagner; Audrey Dalton	American dramatic film centered on an estranged couple sailing on the Titanic during its ill-fated maiden voyage.
1958	A Night to Remember	Roy Ward Baker	Kenneth More; Ronald Allen; Robert Ayres; Honor Blackman	British docudrama based on the eponymous book by Walter Lord starring Kenneth More as the ship's Second Officer Charles Lightoller. Regarded as one of the most historically accurate Titanic disaster films, with the notable exception of not featuring the ship breaking in half. (There was still doubt about the fact she split in two when the book and film were produced. The accepted view at the time and the result of the inquiries was that she sank intact; it was only confirmed that she split after the wreck was found in 1985.) Some effects scenes were 'borrowed' from the 1943 German film.
1964	The Unsinkable; Molly Brown	Charles Walters	Debbie Reynolds; Harve Presnell; Ed Begley	American musical film about the life of Molly Brown, which culminates in her voyage aboard the Titanic. The screenplay by Helen Deutsch is based on the Richard Morris book of the 1960 musical. The scene of the Titanic hitting the iceberg is from the 1953 film and the scene of the ship sinking is colorized footage from A Night to Remember.
1980	Raise the Titanic	Jerry Jameson	Jason Robards; Richard Jordan; David Selby; Anne Archer; Alec Guinness	Although adapted from Clive Cussler's popular novel Raise the Titanic!, this movie was poorly received by critics and proved to be a box office bomb, failing to recover its $40 million budget.
1992	Titanica	Stephen Low	Cedric Smith (original version) / Leonard Nimoy (edited versions)	95-minute IMAX documentary film largely focused on the discovery and exploration of the wreck of the Titanic. Two survivors are featured: Frank Goldsmith's recollections (1977 clip), and Eva Hart is interviewed.
1997	Titanic	James Cameron	Leonardo DiCaprio; Kate Winslet; Billy Zane; Kathy Bates; Frances Fisher; Gloria Stuart	This American romantic epic disaster film combines fictional main characters with some portrayals of passengers and crew based on historical figures. The film became one of the most expensive films ever made, costing approximately US$200 million (more than the Titanic itself), topped the list of highest-grossing films for twelve years and won 11 Academy Awards. Re-released in 2012 in formats which include IMAX 3D; often billed as Titanic in 3D. Re-released in Dolby Vision in 2017 for the 20th anniversary. Actual footage of the wreck is included in the opening scenes.
1997	The Chambermaid (on the Titanic)	Bigas Luna	Aitana Sánchez-Gijón; Olivier Martínez; Romane Bohringer	French-Spanish-Italian romantic film about a stevedore who falls in love with one of the Titanic's chambermaids. From the French novel by Didier Decoin La femme de chambre du Titanic (also original title of film).
1999	The Legend of The Titanic	Kim J. Ok; Orlando Corradi	Jane Alexander; Sean Patrick Lovett; Francis Pardeilhan; Gregory Snegoff	An animated fantasy tale about the sinking of the RMS Titanic, an international co-production between North Korea, the United States, Italy and Spain. This family-friendly retelling of the most notable maritime disaster of all time spawned a rival and a sequel (see below).
2000	Titanic: The Legend Goes On	Camillo Teti, Kim Lox	Lisa Russo; M. Thompson-Ashworth; Gisella Matthews; Kenneth Belton; Gregory Snegoff	A Spanish-Italian animated film about the sinking of the RMS Titanic. Also released as Titanic: The Animated Movie.
2004	In Search of The Titanic	Kim J. Ok	Jane Alexander; Rodolfo Bianchi; Fabio Boccanera	A North Korean-Italian sequel to the animated film The Legend of the Titanic. Also known as Tentacolino.
2010	Titanic II	Shane Van Dyke	Marie Westbrook; Shane Van Dyke; Bruce Davison; Brooke Burns	A mockbuster set aboard a replica Titanic commemorating the 100th anniversary of the original's doomed voyage, and following the same route.
2018	Holmes & Watson	Etan Cohen	Will Ferrell; John C. Reilly	In the final climax of this comedy film, two detectives prevent a plot to assassinate Queen Victoria by detonating a bomb on board the Titanic. The Titanic was actually conceived and built a decade after Queen Victoria died.
2021	The Six	Arthur Jones	Steven Schwankert	A Chinese documentary film about the story of the six Chinese survivors of the RMS Titanic.
2022	Titanic 666	Nick Lyon	Jamie Bamber; Keesha Sharp; Lydia Hearst	A supernatural horror film and sequel to the film Titanic II, set 10 years later and 110 years after the Titanic disaster. Also known as Titanic Rises or Titanic III.
2024	Unsinkable: Titanic Untold	Cody Hartman	Cotter Smith; Karen Allen; Fiona Dourif; Jayne Wisener	An American independent film based on the rushed investigations, political interference and the grasp for corporate accountability, woven amongst flashbacks of the Titanic disaster as it unfolded.
2025	The Day the Titanic sank	Pierre-Yves Bezat	Patrick Chesnais Carl Malapa Clara Antoons Gérard Lanvin	April 1912. The American banker JP Morgan decides not to attend the inaugural cruise of the Titanic. The day after, the lobby boy of the palace receives a phone call: the ship sank during the night. He has to announce to the tycoon the terrible news. French language short film. Also known as Le Jour où le Titanic a coulé.

== Documentaries ==
Year	Title	Studio	Notes
1981	Search for the Titanic	Titanic 1980, Inc	Narrated by Orson Welles, documents Jack Grimm's July 1980 expedition.
1981	Return to the Titanic	Jack F. Grimm Productions	Narrated by James Drury, documents Jack Grimm's June 1981 expedition.
1981	In Search of Titanic	Titanic 1981, Inc	A compilation film featuring footage from Search for the Titanic and Return to the Titanic.
1986	Secrets of the Titanic	National Geographic	Documents the finding of the wreck of the Titanic and the 1986 expedition led by Robert Ballard to find the Titanic
1986	Titanic: The Nightmare and the Dream	TVS Television	This film shows the Titanic and the work carried out by Bob Ballard and his team when they discovered the historic vessel at the bottom of the Atlantic Ocean.
1994	Titanic: The Complete Story	A&E Channel	Four hour documentary in two parts: Death of a Dream (origin of the Titanic, and its tragic sinking. Includes interviews with survivors), and The Legend Lives on (the legacy of the Titanic, and the 1985 discovery of the ship by Robert Ballard). Considered by many experts as the definitive documentary of the Titanic.
1996	The Investigation Begins	Discovery Channel	Documents the first, failed attempt to recover "the big piece" of the Titanic's hull
1997	Anatomy of a Disaster	Discovery Channel	Documents an expedition to the Titanic to determine the effects of microbes on the wreck, document the damage from the iceberg, and test the strength of Titanic's steel
1998	Titanic: Untold Stories	Discovery Channel	Historians retell the stories and experiences of the passengers from submersibles above the Titanic
1999	Deep Inside Titanic	Discovery Channel	Explores inside the Titanic with mini-subs
1999	Titanic: Answers from the Abyss	Discovery Channel	Efforts to document the entire wreck in a photomosaic, explores the breakup angle of the ship, the effect of watertight doors and the sinking of the bow section to the sea floor
2002	Titanic: 90 Years Below	Discovery Channel	Documents the efforts to find, explore and document the Titanic wreck, and the technology developed to find her... including a 2001 expedition to document the Titanic wreck with HD cameras
2003	Modern Marvels: Titanic Tech	History Channel	Explores the technology used aboard the Titanic
2003	Ghosts of the Abyss	Disney	James Cameron returns to the Titanic with select cast members from the 1997 movie to explore more of the wreck
2005	Last Mysteries of the Titanic with James Cameron	Discovery Channel	Expedition with James Cameron to explore the interior of the wreck of the Titanic and document the condition of many unseen areas such as the Turkish baths and First Class Boarding Entrance
2005	Titanic: Birth of a Legend	Discovery Channel	Dramatization of the construction of the Titanic at Harland & Wolfe Shipyard, with many photographs of the ship and her sister Olympic under construction
2006	Seconds From Disaster: Sinking of the Titanic	National Geographic	Dramatization explaining how the "Unsinkable" ship sunk.
2007	Titanic's Achilles Heel	History Channel	Documentary explores the theory that Titanic's expansion joints contributed to the breakup of the hull
2008	Titanic: Ballard's Secret Mission	National Geographic	Documentary reveals the true purpose of Robert Ballard's expedition to find the Titanic was a secret mission by the US Navy
2011	What Sank Titanic	Discovery Channel – Curiosity	Explains how the mechanical sophistication of the Titanic was beaten by an iceberg. Recreations and historical analysis explore the mysteries of the tragedy.
2012	Titanic at 100: Mystery Solved	History Channel	Explores the possibility that Titanic had a fatal flaw that doomed the ship.
2012	Titanic: Case Closed (British/international title) /Titanic's Final Mystery (American title)	National Geographic (U.K./International)/Smithsonian Channel/Paramount (U.S.)	Presents a new theory why Titanic was unable to avoid the iceberg, and why nearby ships seemed to ignore the Titanic, and were even uncertain whether the lights they saw were the Titanic
2012	Titanic: The Final Word with James Cameron	National Geographic	James Cameron presents a new analysis and theory into the sequence of the sinking and breakup of the Titanic, informed by a paper by J.W. Stettler of the USCG
2012	Save the Titanic with Bob Ballard	National Geographic	Bob Ballard examines the damage to the wreck from repeated expeditions and implores that the wreck be protected by international agreements to prevent looting
2020	Back to the Titanic	National Geographic	First Expedition to return to the Titanic in nearly 15 years (claimed) examines the worsening state of decay of the wreck
2020	Titanic's Lost Evidence	History Channel	Examines the notes of Lord Mersey from original 1912 British inquiry
2022	Mysteries from the Grave: The Titanic	Tubi	Interviews with survivors' family also features Titanic honor and glory
2024	How It Really Happened: Titanic	CNN	Reviews latest findings and addresses the Titan Submersible tragedy
2025	Titanic: The Digital Resurrection/Titanic: The Digital Resurrection: Beyond the Wreck (extended version)	National Geographic	New examination of the tragedy through analysis of "Digital Twin"
2025	Titanic Sinks Tonight	BBC Two	Four-episode docudrama relating personal accounts of the survivors

== Television movies and notable episodes ==
Year	Title	Director	Cast	Notes
1955	"The Sinking of the Titanic: You Are There"; You Are There	Walter Cronkite	Tod Hunter; Klieth Roberts; Harlow Wilkoff	Episode of a CBS program called You Are There.
1955	"The Titanic Incident"; Screen Directors Playhouse	Ted Tetzlaff	Leo Genn, May Wynn, and Philip Reed	Television episode of Screen Directors Playhouse set aboard the Titanic.
1956	"A Night to Remember"; Kraft Television Theatre	George Roy Hill	Bradford Dillman; Neil North	Live TV adaptation of Walter Lord's 1955 book of the same name; narrated by Claude Rains.
1957	"The Unsinkable Molly Brown"; Telephone Time	Erle C. Kenton	Cloris Leachman	Short segment (using footage from the 1943 German film) from the TV version of John Nesbitt's Passing Parade series. Leachman would again play the same role in S.O.S. Titanic (1979).
1959	"Night of April 14th" Alcoa Presents: One Step Beyond	John Newland	Patrick Macnee; Barbara Lord; Isobel Elsom	Purported docudrama relating stories of premonitions and nightmares preceding the disaster. The scene of the Titanic hitting the iceberg is from the 1937 drama film History Is Made at Night of the fictional ocean liner SS Princess Irene.
1961	"I Heard You Calling Me"; Way Out	Daniel Petrie	Constance Ford; Neil Fitzgerald; Anthony Dawson	A woman planning to elope with a married man is invited on a free ocean cruise – by the ghost of the man's mother, who died on the Titanic.
1966	"Rendezvous With Yesterday"; The Time Tunnel	Irwin Allen	James Darren; Robert Colbert	In the first episode of the series, the time travelers arrive on board the Titanic one day before the pending disaster. They try to warn the captain, but disbelieving them, he has them locked up and they narrowly avoid going down with the ship. Some footage and sets from the 1953 film are included in the episode.
1971	"Lone Survivor"; Night Gallery	Gene Levitt	John Colicos; Torin Thatcher; Hedley Mattingly	This story in the anthology series was written by Rod Serling. A survivor in a Titanic lifeboat is discovered – three years after the event, by the Lusitania.
1973	"Miss Forrest", "A House Divided"; Upstairs, Downstairs	Bill Bain; Christopher Hodson	Rachel Gurney; Patsy Smart; Meg Wynn Owen; David Langton; Simon Williams; Gordon Jackson; Jean Marsh	The series' 3rd season opens with "Miss Forrest" where it is learned that two main characters are aboard the Titanic. Mistress Lady Marjorie Bellamy (Gurney) and her maid, Miss Roberts (Smart) are both presumed dead. In the next episode, "A House Divided", it is learned that the maid survives, but is in emotional shock. Eventually she relates how her mistress died on the Titanic.
1979	S.O.S. Titanic	William Hale	David Janssen; Cloris Leachman	Depiction of the doomed 1912 voyage from the perspective of three distinct groups of passengers in First, Second, and Third Class. Some characters are based on historical figures. Shorter version released theatrically in Europe. The scenes of the ship sinking are colorized footage from A Night to Remember. Some scenes were filmed aboard the TSS Manxman and the RMS Queen Mary. This was the first Titanic film to be released in color.
1983	"Voyagers of the Titanic"; Voyagers!	Winrich Kolbe	Jon-Erik Hexum; Meeno Peluce	Bogg and Jeff find themselves aboard the doomed Titanic. Jeff wants to prevent the disaster, but Bogg warns him he can't: it is destined to happen. Although failing to prevent the disaster, they save the Mona Lisa from being lost with the ship. Footage of the ship sinking was cut from the opening from Raise The Titanic. Also contains colorized footage of the iceberg and the Titanic from the 1953 film, stock footage of the RMS Queen Mary and some scenes filmed aboard the Queen Mary.
1983	"Terror on the Titanic"; Superfriends			During a diving exploration on the Titanic wreck two divers were attacked by algae monsters caused by a mutation from the ship's wreckage when it sank. When Aquaman and Black Vulcan was sent over, the algae monsters turn the Titanic into a living monster that eats boats and went on a rampage on Newfondland. The Titanic-monster was defeated by Aquaman and Black Vulcan when they tricked it into crashing into an iceberg and made it sank again as a result.
1984	Titanic - Nachspiel einer Katastrophe	Lutz Büscher	Hans Korte; Volkert Kraeft; Arthur Brauss	(Titanic – Aftermath of a disaster), German TV courtroom drama centered on the United States Senate inquiry into the sinking of the Titanic.
1996	Titanic	Robert Lieberman	Peter Gallagher; George C. Scott; Catherine Zeta-Jones; Tim Curry	This two-part television drama was the first depiction to show the Titanic splitting in two.
1996	No Greater Love	Richard T. Heffron	Kelly Rutherford	Romance in which a young woman takes charge of her young siblings, upon losing her fiancé and parents in the disaster. Based on the Danielle Steel novel of the same name. The scenes of the ship sinking include footage from S.O.S. Titanic; as in that film, some scenes were filmed aboard the Queen Mary.
1999	"A Flight to Remember"; Futurama	Peter Avanzino	Billy West; Katey Sagal; John DiMaggio	The Planet Express team take a cruise on the largest starship ever built: the Titanic, which is torn in half and sucked into a black hole on its maiden voyage.
2000	Britannic	Brian Trenchard-Smith	Edward Atterton; Amanda Ryan; Jacqueline Bisset; John Rhys-Davies	This television film is mostly about the sinking of the Titanic's sister ship HMHS Britannic, but includes a Titanic survivor's flashback showing the Titanic sinking.
2002	Thumbtanic	Steve Oedekerk		Short film (26 min.) which parodies the 1997 film; part of the Thumbs! series
2005	Titanic: Birth of a Legend	William Lyons	Charles Dance; Gordon Langford Rowe; Charles Lawson; Damian O'Hare; Christopher Wright	A 70-minute docudrama. The story focuses on the lives of the men who built Titanic and her sister ship RMS Olympic.
2006	"No Time for Nuts			During many time jumps, Scrat ends up in Ice Field on April 14, 2012 mistaking it for his home until he saw the Titanic appear in sight and despite trying to outrun it he gets hit when the ship collided with the Iceberg though only made him dizy before his time machine sends him away.
2007	"Voyage of the Damned"; Doctor Who	James Strong	David Tennant; Kylie Minogue	A luxury space cruiser called the Titanic, a pastiche of the ocean liner, crashes into the TARDIS. The Doctor works with a waitress to prevent a collision with Earth. In another episode entitled "Turn Left", the Titanic crashes into London, killing millions.
2008	"The Cursed Tuba Contingency"; The Middleman	Jeremiah Chechik	Matt Keeslar; Natalie Morales	To avert dire consequences, the Middleman (Kesslar) and Wendy (Morales) must prevent a tuba from the Titanic from being played. In a flashback of the ship's sinking, footage from the 1943 film is used.
2010	"The Mutants Are Revolting"; Futurama	Raymie Muzquiz	Billy West; Katey Sagal; John DiMaggio	In the sewers of New New York, the Planet Express crew discover the wreck of the Land Titanic, the largest articulated bus ever built, which sailed down Fifth Avenue in 2912 and struck a mail box and sank into the ground.
2010	Titanic II	Shane Van Dyke	Shane Van Dyke; Brooke Burns	A cruise liner sets sail on the 100th anniversary of the Titanic's doomed maiden voyage. When a tsunami hurls an iceberg into the ship's path, the crew and passengers struggle to avoid suffering the same fate as their predecessors.
2010	"Episode One"; Downton Abbey	Brian Percival		The first series opens with news of the Crawley family heir's death aboard the Titanic. Also referenced in Episode Six of Season 2.
2011	"My Heart Will Go On"; Supernatural	Phil Sgriccia	Jared Padalecki; Jensen Ackles; Misha Collins	An angel changes history by averting the sinking of the Titanic, with unforeseen consequences.
2012	Saving the Titanic	Maurice Sweeney	David Wilmot; Ciarán McMenamin; Owen McDonnell	90-minute PBS docudrama. The story of the selfless engineers who kept the Titanic's essential electricity running during the tragedy. Renamed as Heroes of the Titanic for UK broadcast on History.
2012	Titanic	Jon Jones	Linus Roache; Geraldine Somerville	Four-part television drama based around characters present on the ship during its sinking. Shows the Titanic splitting in two at a much shallower angle, in accordance with a new breakup theory.
2012	Titanic: Blood and Steel	Ciaran Donnelly	Neve Campbell; Derek Jacobi	12-part television drama, telling the story of the construction of the ship. Contains numerous deviations from historical facts, mostly regarding the construction timeline.
2012	Titanic: The Aftermath	Marion Milne	Jeremy Akerman; John Dunsworth	90-minute docudrama on the lives of those who survived the sinking.
2015	"Stewie, Chris, & Brian's Excellent Adventure"; Family Guy	Joe Vaux	Seth MacFarlane; Alex Borstein; Seth Green	In the second half of the episode, Stewie, Brian, and Chris end up on the Titanic during their time travel adventure and manage to leave the ship during the sinking.
2022	Titanic 666	Nick Lyon	Joseph Gatt; Jhey Castles; Michael J. Chen	Following the events of Titanic II, the Titanic III begins its maiden voyage to the original wreck site. However, the passengers start turning into ghosts after the ship's arrival, resulting in the sinking of the ship.

== See also ==
- Titanic in popular culture
- Cultural legacy of the Titanic
