= La hantise =

- Directed by: Louis Feuillade
- Screenplay by: Louis Feuillade
- Starring: Renée Carl; René Navarre
- Production company: Gaumont
- Release date: October 1912
- Running time: 24 minutes
- Country: France

La hantise (English: The Obsession) is a 1912 short silent film directed by Louis Feuillade and is the second-earliest surviving film about the RMS Titanic. The film stars Renée Carl and René Navarre. The film focuses on a woman who is told by a palm reader that one of her loved ones will die. The woman then tries to convince her husband not to board the RMS Titanic, as she fears for his safety. The husband boards nonetheless, though is rescued by the RMS Carpathia after Titanic sinks. The film is said to confront the fraud of palm reading, highlighting the suffering that obsessive belief in the supernatural can create.

The Centre national du cinéma et de l'image animée holds an incomplete 35mm copy of the film.

== Cast ==
- Renée Carl as Madame Trévoux
- René Navarre as Jacques Trévoux
- Miss Édith as The Palmist
- Henri Jullien as Madame Trévoux' Godfather
- Maurice Mathieu as Little Georges

== See also ==
- List of films about the RMS Titanic
