= Cultural legacy of the Titanic =

The sinking of the ocean liner Titanic in April 1912 has left an extensive cultural legacy across literature, film, theatre, visual art, popular myths, memorials, and museums. In the immediate aftermath of the disaster, poetry, survivor accounts, sensationalist books, and memorabilia proliferated, while later works—such as Walter Lord's A Night to Remember and films including A Night to Remember (1958) and James Cameron's Titanic (1997)—helped shape popular memory of the ship. Its cultural reach also extends into stage productions, visual art, anime and manga, video games, and linguistic references, alongside enduring legends and myths concerning its supposed unsinkable design, the ship's band, and distress signals.

Commemorations of the tragedy include memorials and monuments in locations linking to the ship and its passengers—such as Southampton, Liverpool, Belfast, New York, Washington, D.C., Cobh, and Halifax, Nova Scotia—as well as museums and exhibitions housing artefacts, models, and replicas including Titanic Belfast, the Merseyside Maritime Museum, the Maritime Museum of the Atlantic, and several venues in the United States; the centenary of the sinking in 2011–12 prompted a wide range of events, exhibitions, performances, and tributes marking the disaster's enduring impact.

The disaster has inspired numerous books, plays, films, songs, poems and works of art, and has lent itself to a great variety of interpretations of its significance, meaning and legacy. It has also been marked by many memorials across key locations associated with the ship and its passengers, while several museums have been established to house artefacts and exhibitions relating to the ship.

Artefacts and the remaining wreckage in the Atlantic Ocean has also proved popular, with documentaries and virtual renderings created to show how the ship looks now. The 100th anniversary of the sinking was commemorated with a number of events, memorials and artistic performances.

== Films and literature ==
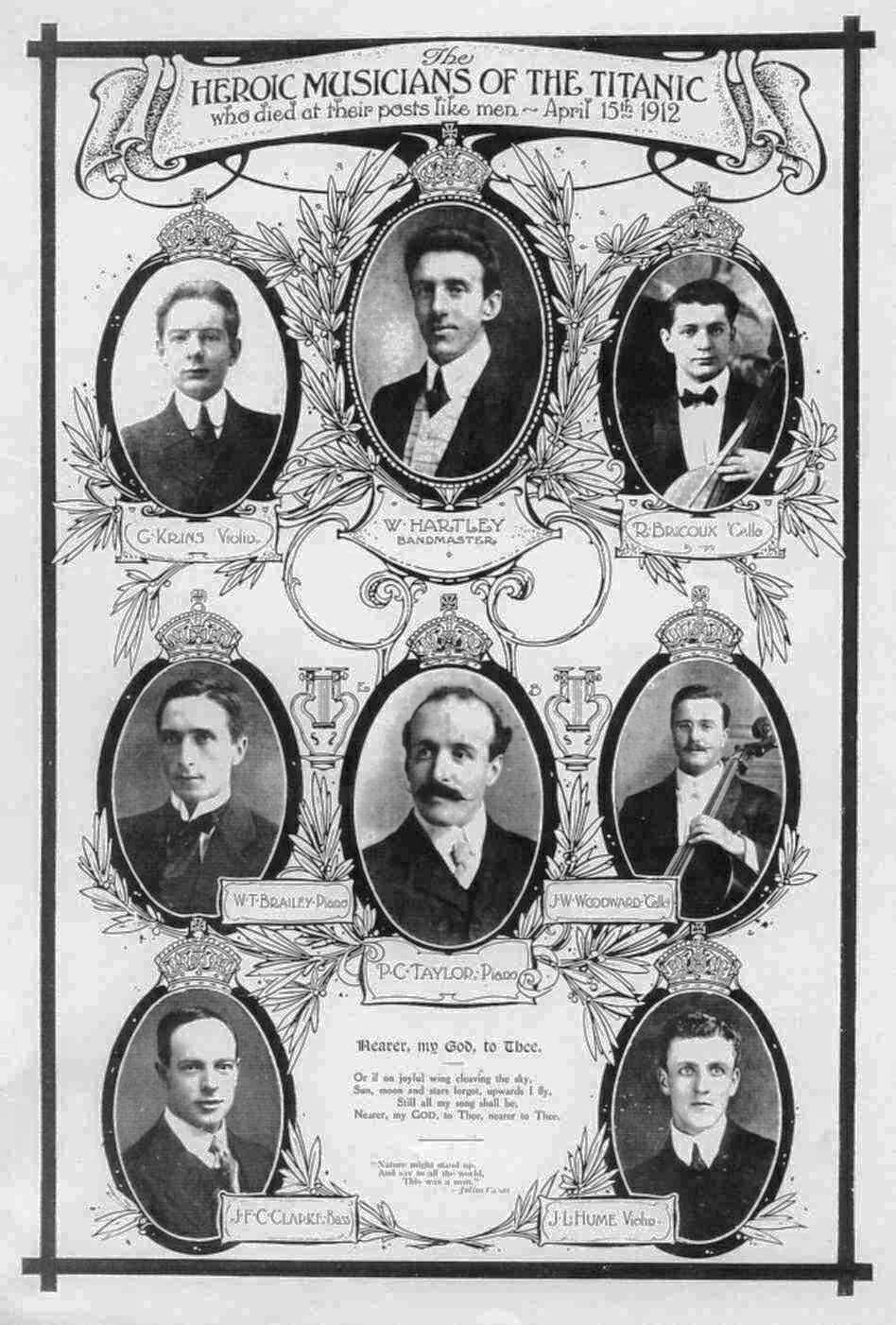
The eight members of Titanic's band, who became a focus for many commemorations of the disaster

The immediate aftermath of Titanic's sinking saw an outpouring of poetry, though much of it was dismissed by The New York Times as "worthless" and "intolerably bad" and by Current Literature as "unutterably horrible", though Thomas Hardy's "The Convergence of the Twain" (1912) was one of the more significant works to emerge from the disaster. Several survivors wrote books about their experiences and various hack writers cashed in on the tragedy by producing sensationalist "dollar books" culled from the often inaccurate press coverage. 1955 saw the publication of Walter Lord's influential non-fiction book A Night to Remember which weaved numerous personal accounts from survivors.

The sinking of the Titanic has been a popular subject for visual artists, whether in paintings and illustrations or on the screen. The first Titanic newsreel films were released within days of the disaster; one by Gaumont was a huge hit and played to packed houses around the world, often accompanied by the audience singing the hymn Nearer, My God, to Thee at the climax of the film. There have also been many drama films set aboard Titanic. The first such film about the disaster, Saved from the Titanic, is now lost. It was released only 29 days after the ship sank and had an actual survivor as its star—the silent film actress Dorothy Gibson. The story of the sinking was also told in heavily fictionalised form as a Nazi propaganda movie (Titanic, 1943) and as an American melodrama (Titanic, 1953). The British film A Night to Remember (1958) is still widely regarded as the most historically accurate movie portrayal of the sinking, but the most successful by far has been James Cameron's Titanic (1997), which became the highest-grossing film in history up to that time.

A great variety of memorabilia was also produced. Memorial postcards sold in huge numbers; one popular series produced in Britain showed verses from Nearer, My God, to Thee alongside a mourning woman and Titanic sinking in the background. The disaster was commemorated in numerous other forms, ranging from tin candy boxes to commemorative plates, whiskey jiggers, and even black mourning teddy bears. The latter are now hugely sought-after and examples have sold for over $135,000.

=== In anime and manga ===
The Japanese manga spin-off series of Doraemon known as The Doraemons featured the Titanic in a special chapter entitled Titanic the Ghost Ship, which takes inspiration from the famous 1997 James Cameron film using several elements from the film. During this chapter, Dora-the-Kid acts as Jack Dawson facing on Rose DeWitt Bukater, both of whom are characters from the 1997 film.

In the 2017 anime movie Black Butler: Book of the Atlantic, the fictional ocean liner Campania suffers a similar fate to Titanic including getting hit by an iceberg and splitting in half as well as lifeboats being filled by women and children first. The Campania also appears in the Black butler manga, in volumes IX-XIV, and it is filled with corpses that have been made to appear revived, or to use their terms, "Absolute Salvation".

== On stage ==
In 1997, the musical Titanic was made. It won Tony Award for Best Musical.

In 2024, British theatremaker Russell Lucas made a show about openly gay Titanic survivor Edward Dorking. Third Class – A Titanic Story charts Edward's journey on the American vaudeville circuit as he recreates the third-class experience.

== Art ==
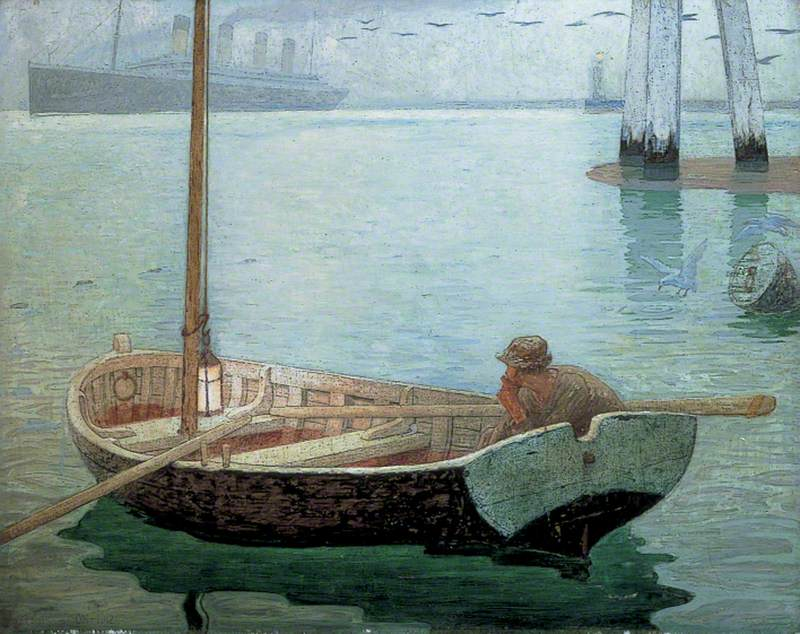
The Outward Bound, 1912, by Frederick Cayley Robinson

Frederick Cayley Robinson's 1912 oil painting The Outward Bound shows a youth in a boat watching as Titanic leaves Southampton. It was commissioned in memory of Titanic's band leader, violinist Wallace Hartley, and given to Leeds Art Gallery by the Leeds Professional Musicians. The painting was unveiled in the City Art Gallery by the Lord Mayor of Leeds on 23 December 1912.

== Legends and myths ==
The Titanic has gone down in history as the ship that was called unsinkable. (Note: An example is Daniel Butler's book about the Titanic, titled: Unsinkable) However, even though countless news stories after the sinking called Titanic unsinkable, prior to the sinking the White Star Line had used the term "designed to be unsinkable", and other pre-sinking publications described the ship as "virtually unsinkable". Another well-known story is that of the ship's band, led by Wallace Hartley, who heroically played on while the great steamer was sinking. This seems to be true but there has been conflicting information about which song was the last to be heard. The most reported is "Nearer, My God, to Thee", though "Autumn" has been mentioned. (Note: Earlier on during the sinking, more cheerful songs were played like ragtimes.) Finally, a widespread myth is that the internationally recognised Morse code distress signal "SOS" was first put to use when the Titanic sank. While it is true that British wireless operators rarely used the "SOS" signal at the time, preferring the older "CQD" code, "SOS" had been used internationally since 1908. The first wireless operator on Titanic, Jack Phillips, sent both "SOS" and "CQD" as distress calls.

== Memorials and monuments ==
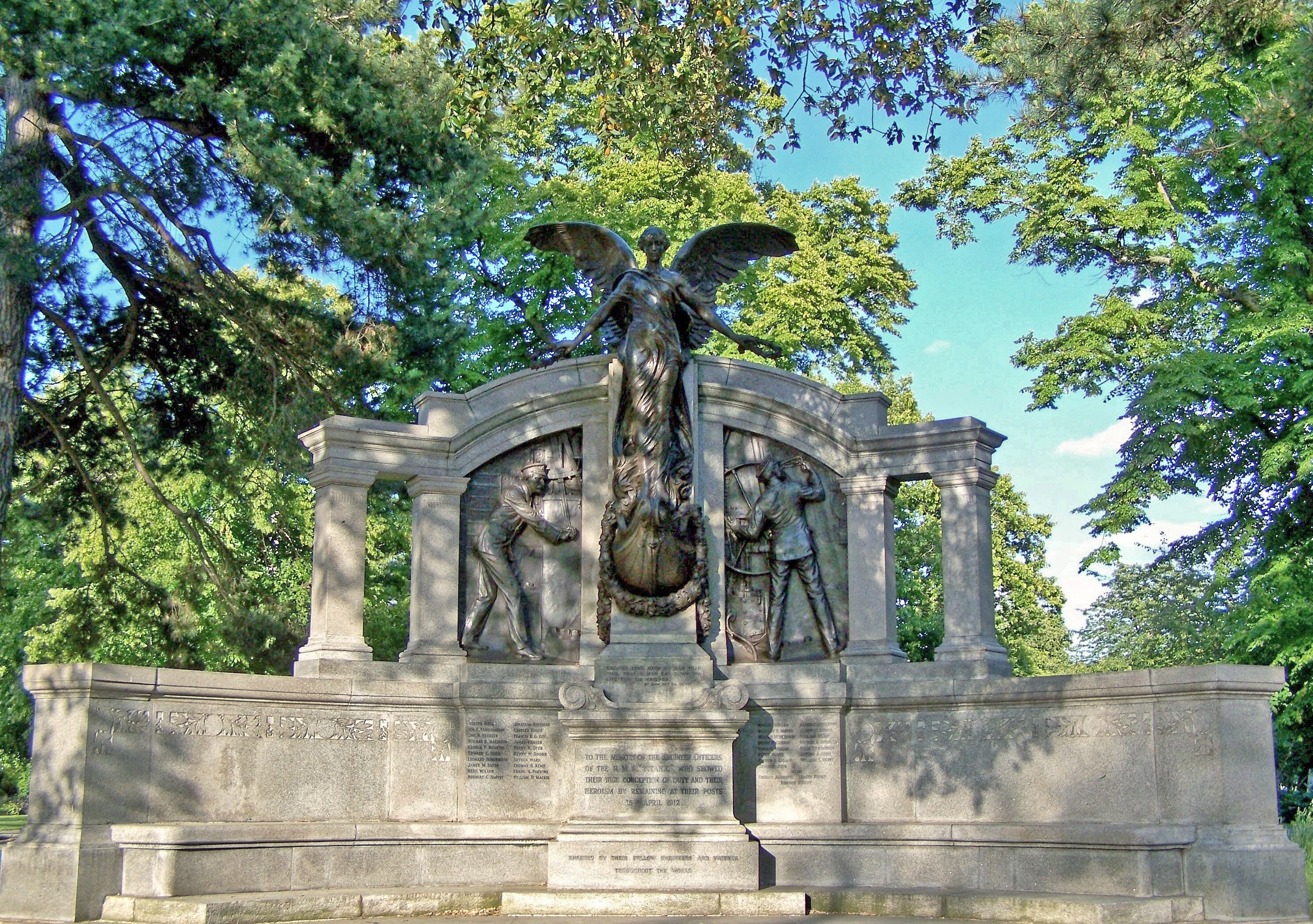
Memorial to Titanic's engineers in Southampton, England, unveiled in 1914

The Titanic disaster was commemorated though a variety of memorials and monuments to the victims, erected in several English-speaking countries and in particular in cities that had suffered notable losses. These included Southampton, Liverpool and Belfast in the United Kingdom; New York and Washington, D.C. in the United States; and Cobh (formerly Queenstown) in Ireland. Individual British victims of the disaster are commemorated in a number of places, notably Captain Smith in Lichfield, wireless operator Jack Phillips in Godalming and musician Wallace Hartley in his home town of Colne. Most of the bodies recovered after the disaster are buried under simple black granite headstones in Halifax, Nova Scotia. Two towns in Australia, Ballarat and Broken Hill, built memorials to the ship's musicians.

Each year, on the anniversary of the sinking, a wreath is laid at the site by the United States Coast Guard's International Ice Patrol.

== Museums ==
A number of museums around the world have displays on Titanic. In Northern Ireland, the ship is commemorated by the Titanic Belfast visitor attraction, opened on 31 March 2012, that stands on the site of the shipyard where Titanic was built. The Ulster Folk and Transport Museum also has a substantial exhibition called TITANICa. In England, artefacts relating to the disaster are preserved at the SeaCity Museum in Southampton and the Merseyside Maritime Museum in Liverpool, which has the original 20 feet (6.1 m) long builder's model of the ship. The National Maritime Museum also has a large Titanic-related collection, donated by the author and producer of A Night to Remember.

Several Titanic museums operate in the United States. The Titanic Museum in Indian Orchard, Massachusetts, presents the collection of the Titanic Historical Society. It includes artefacts including original blueprints of the ship, the lifejacket of John Jacob Astor (which he gave to his wife when they parted aboard Titanic), and original wireless messages. In Branson, Missouri a Titanic Museum is located inside a half-size replica of the ship, complete with iceberg. It presents replicas of the ship's lobby, cabins and wireless rooms and various items of memorabilia and artefacts. The same company operates the Titanic Museum in Pigeon Forge, Tennessee, which recreates the ship's Grand Staircase as well as enabling visitors to experience the cold of the ocean and the heat of the boiler rooms. Titanic The Experience—in Orlando, Florida—likewise recreates the Grand Staircase, the Verandah Café, a first-class suite and part of the Promenade Deck. Actors in period dress provide guided tours to visitors. RMS Titanic Inc., which is authorised to salvage the wreck site, has a permanent Titanic exhibition at the Luxor Las Vegas hotel and casino in Nevada which features a 22-ton slab of the ship's hull. It also runs a travelling exhibition which travels around the world.

In Nova Scotia, Halifax's Maritime Museum of the Atlantic displays many items that were recovered from the sea a few days after the disaster. They include pieces of woodwork such as panelling from the ship's First Class Lounge and an original deckchair, as well as objects recovered from the bodies of the victims who were buried in the city's cemeteries. At Cape Race, Newfoundland and Labrador, the Myrick Wireless Interpretive Centre is set to open a permanent Titanic exhibit. This site of a former Marconi wireless station was the first on land to respond to Titanic's distress call, transmitted hundreds of messages from passengers, and was used to coordinate the rescue effort.

== 100th anniversary commemoration ==
At 12:13 pm on 31 May 2011, exactly 100 years after Titanic rolled down her slipway, a single flare was fired over Belfast's docklands in commemoration. All boats in the area around the Harland and Wolff shipyard then sounded their horns and the assembled crowd applauded for exactly 62 seconds, the time it had originally taken for the liner to roll down the slipway in 1911. On 12 March 2012 BBC's Songs of Praise, from Belfast, took the form of a Titanic memorial. The programme included a selection of maritime hymns and ended with Nearer, My God, to Thee, allegedly the last tune played by the ship's band.

On 27 March 2012, Titanic 3D premiered at the Royal Albert Hall in London, with James Cameron and Kate Winslet in attendance, and entered general release on 4 April 2012, six days shy of the centenary of Titanic embarking on her maiden voyage. ITV1 produced a four-part Titanic miniseries, written by Oscar-winner Julian Fellowes, broadcast in March and April 2012. Titanic Tales: Stories of Courage and Cowardice is a dramatic production co-written by Duncan McCargo and Stephanie Winters, based on original testimonies of survivors, along with authentic music. It was commissioned by Lincoln Center for the Performing Arts and premiered in New York on 12 April 2012.

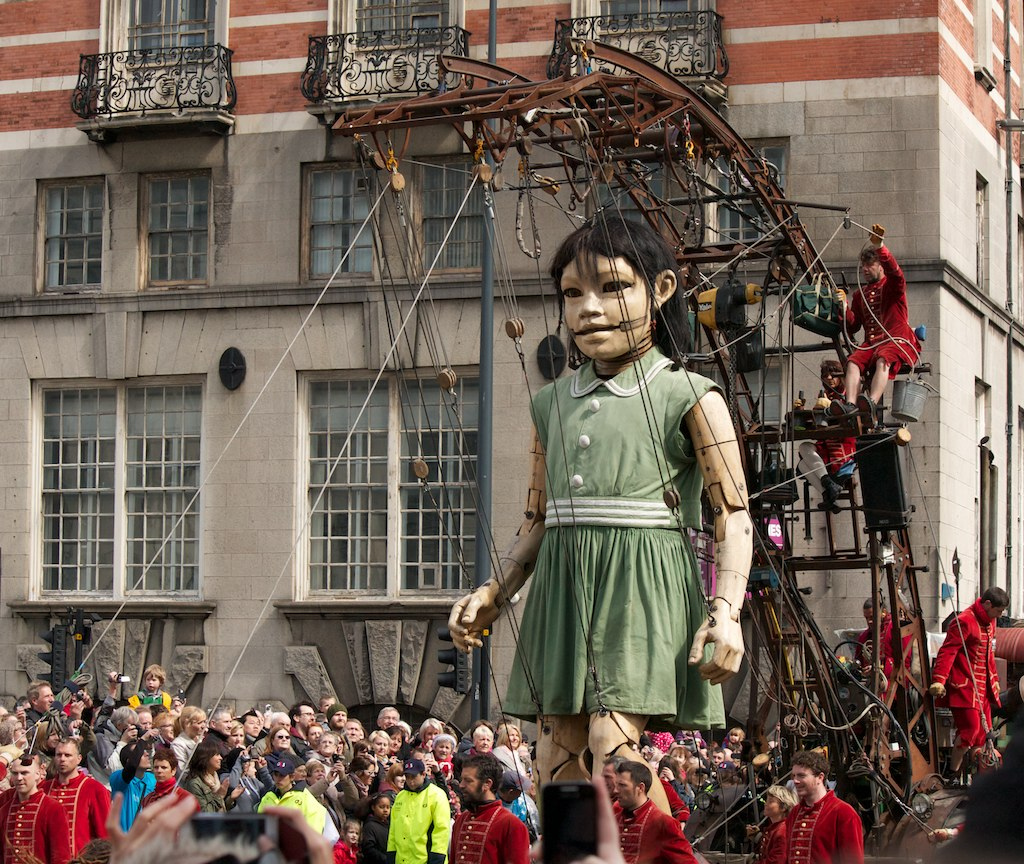
Little Girl Giant in front of the former White Star Line headquarters during Liverpool's Sea Odyssey street theatre event

An original stageplay called Iceberg—Right Ahead! was performed at Upstairs at The Gatehouse, London from 22 March–22 April 2012, the Lyric Theatre, Belfast performed White Star of the North, and the street theatre event Sea Odyssey: Giant Spectacular was held in Liverpool over the weekend of 20–22 April. The event which attracted 600,000 spectators was inspired by a letter written by a 10-year-old Liverpudlian girl, May McMurray, in 1912 to her father William, a bedroom steward on the Titanic who did not survive the sinking. The letter never reached him and is now on display at the Merseyside Maritime Museum.

The Royal Philharmonic Orchestra performed The Titanic Requiem, a work composed by singer/songwriter Robin Gibb and his son RJ Gibb, at the premiere on 10 April in London. The event includes a hologram show depicting the sea, the ship, and the iceberg.

On 14 April 2012, Halifax's Maritime Museum of the Atlantic held a candle-lit procession by the water from the museum to Halifax's Grand Parade, which passed some of the city's Titanic related landmarks along the way. Following this, Halifax's Fairview Lawn Cemetery held an interfaith memorial service in remembrance of the hundreds of lives lost in the Titanic tragedy and for the 121 Titanic victims buried at the cemetery, followed by a wreath-laying and musical performance the next day.

The SeaCity Museum in Southampton, Hampshire opened on 10 April 2012, the date when the Titanic made her maiden voyage out of Southampton. It was designed to show Southampton's 2,000 years of sea history, as well as commemorate the 549 city residents who sunk with the Titanic.

To mark the 100th anniversary of the sinking, the BBC World Service broadcast on 10 April 2012 a radio documentary in the "Discovery" series, entitled Titanic—In Her Own Words. The programme was conceived and created by Susanne Weber and was narrated by Sean Coughlan who had previously written a book on the Titanic radio messages. The programme used voice synthesis to re-create "the strange, twitter-like, mechanical brevity of the original Morse code messages..." transmitted by Titanic and neighbouring ships. The messages often included the fashionable slang expressions of the time such as "old man". The BBC noted: "All such messages were recorded at the time in copper plate handwriting, and were now scattered across the world in different collections, but together formed a unique archive". On 14 April BBC Radio 2 aired a three-hour minute-by-minute account of the disaster to coincide with the time it happened.

Besides commemorations on land, two ships participated in memorial services at the spot where Titanic sank. Azamara Journey left New York on 10 April, with passengers interested in the Titanic story, many dressed in period attire. A stop was made at Halifax to visit the graves of 121 victims. A second ship, MV Balmoral, operated by Fred Olsen Cruise Lines, set sail from Southampton with 1,309 passengers on 8 April to follow the original route of Titanic. Onboard memorial services were held on 15 April 2012 over the place where Titanic rests, 640 kilometres (400 mi) off the coast of Newfoundland. Addressing the assemblage, retired Cunard Commodore Ron Warwick said:

"We come together in a spirit of remembrance to give thanks for the lives of the 1,503 men, women, and children lost to the freezing Atlantic 100 years ago tonight, when the Titanic met its end under these stars and on this very spot ... Darkness was on the face of the deep. We remember the families torn apart by this tragedy ..."

At exactly 2:20 am, the moment when the great ship foundered, the Balmoral's whistle gave a sustained blast. As a White Star Line burgee flew from the ship's fantail, three wreaths of remembrance were lowered to the ocean's surface and the crowd sang Eternal Father, Strong to Save with great emotion.

Postage stamps have been issued to mark the centennial: Canada Post issued a series of five designs, Britain's Royal Mail issued a set of ten, Gibraltar created five stamps, Isle of Man, six. and the Republic of Ireland's post office, An Post, issued four commemorative stamps The Canadian Mint produced a $10 silver commemorative coin, and two coloured collector coins (25¢ and 50¢) and the British Mint two £5 coins.

== Replicas and amusements ==
Following previous abortive attempts to construct a replica, on 30 April 2012, Clive Palmer, an Australian mining magnate, declared his plans to build Titanic II in China.

The ship has also been the inspiration for children's bouncy castles and inflatable slides. Its design has also been recreated by Lego, which released a set of the Titanic as part of their Icons theme. The set is 53 inches long, becoming the longest Lego set as of 2024, and takes 9,090 pieces to build.

== Linguistic ==
The phrase "rearranging the deck chairs on the Titanic" entered American English in the late 1960s as a metaphor for wasting effort on something that will soon become meaningless.

== Video games ==
In 1996, an adventure game titled Titanic: Adventure Out of Time featured an extensive virtual recreation of the ship's interior and exterior in 3D and a plot taking place on the night of the disaster. The concept of a fully explorable virtual copy of the Titanic is also being developed in the forthcoming Titanic: Honor and Glory, produced by the group Vintage Digital Revival.

The Titanic was also used as the basis of a map in Call of Duty: Black Ops 4 (specifically, Zombies map "Voyage of Despair") and a level in Duke Nukem: Zero Hour.

Other games and interactive fiction have focused on the wreck of the Titanic, including 1989's oceanographic simulator Search for the Titanic, a 1998 game endorsed by explorer Robert Ballard called Titanic: Challenge of Discovery, and a game from Magellan that allows players to pilot an ROV around the wreck based on digital scans of the real wreck. The early access version of this game, vROVpilot: Titanic, released on December 31, 2024.

== See also ==
- Futility, or the Wreck of the Titan (1898), a novella written by Morgan Robertson that outlined events similar to that of Titanic, fourteen years prior to her sinking
- "How the Mail Steamer Went Down in Mid Atlantic by a Survivor" (1886), a short story by First Class passenger William Thomas Stead, which outlines the ensuing disaster of a ship that is put to sea without enough lifeboats; often seen as foreshadowing the Titanic's sinking

== Bibliography ==
Books:

- Adams, Simon (2009) [1999]. Eyewitness, Titanic. New York: DK Publishing. ISBN 978-0-7566-5036-0.
- Anderson, D. Brian (2005). The Titanic in Print and on Screen. Jefferson, NC: McFarland & Company. ISBN 0-7864-1786-2.
- Barczewski, Stephanie (2011). Titanic: A Night Remembered: Centenary Edition. London: Continuum International Publishing Group. ISBN 978-1-4411-6169-7.
- Biel, Steven (1996). Down with the Old Canoe. London: W.W. Norton & Company. ISBN 0-393-03965-X.
- Bottomore, Stephen (2000). The Titanic and Silent Cinema. Hastings, UK: The Projection Box. ISBN 978-1-903000-00-7.
- Butler, Daniel Allen (1998). Unsinkable: the full story of the RMS Titanic. Mechanicsburg, PA: Stackpole Books. ISBN 978-0-8117-1814-1.
- Campbell, Ballard C. (2008). Disaster, Accidents and Crises in American History: A Reference Guide to the Nation's Most Catastrophic Events. Facts on File Library of American History. New York: Infobase Publishing. ISBN 978-0-8160-6603-2.
- Cartwright, Roger; Cartwright, June (2011). Titanic: The Myths and Legacy of a Disaster. Stroud, Glos.: The History Press. ISBN 978-0-7524-5176-3.
- Eaton, John P.; Haas, Charles A. (1995). Titanic: Triumph and Tragedy. New York: W.W. Norton & Company. ISBN 978-0-393-03697-8.
- Eaton, John P.; Haas, Charles A. (1999). Titanic: A Journey Through Time. Sparkford, Somerset: Patrick Stephens. ISBN 978-1-85260-575-9.
- Heyer, Paul (2012). Titanic Century: Media, Myth, and the Making of a Cultural Icon. Santa Barbara, CA: ABC-CLIO. ISBN 978-0-313-39815-5.
- Lord, Walter (1997) [1955]. A Night to Remember (3rd ed.). New York: Henry Holt and Company. ISBN 978-0-553-27827-9.
- Maniera, Leyla (2003). Christie's Century of Teddy Bears. London: Pavilion. ISBN 978-1-86205-595-7.
- Maxtone-Graham, John (2012). Titanic Tragedy: A New Look at the Lost Liner. New York: W. W. Norton & Company. ISBN 978-0-393-08339-2.
- Parisi, Paula (1998). Titanic and the Making of James Cameron. New York: Newmarket Press. ISBN 978-1-55704-364-1.
- Rasor, Eugene L. (2001). The Titanic: historiography and annotated bibliography. Westport, CT: Greenwood Publishing Group. ISBN 978-0-313-31215-1.
- Spignesi, Stephen J. (2012). The Titanic For Dummies. Hoboken, NJ: John Wiley & Sons. ISBN 978-1-118-20651-5.
- Ward, Greg (2012). The Rough Guide to the Titanic. London: Rough Guides Ltd. ISBN 978-1-4053-8699-9.

Journals and news articles:

- "New Titanic Belfast complex opens". BBC News. 31 March 2012.

Web sites:

- "National Maritime Museum receives historic Titanic archive: the Lord-Macquitty Collection". National Maritime Museum. 7 April 2003. Archived from the original on 14 April 2012.
