= Titanic: Challenge of Discovery =

1998 video game

- Developer: Maris Multimedia
- Publisher: Panasonic Interactive Media
- Platform: Microsoft Windows
- Release: WW: August 24, 1998
- Genre: Adventure game
- Mode: Single player

Titanic: Challenge of Discovery is a video game for Microsoft Windows developed by Maris Multimedia's Moscow studio and published by Panasonic Interactive Media on Aug 24, 1998.

The player is part of an underwater archaeological team in charge of three famous wrecks: the Roman galley Isis, the German battleship Bismarck, and the RMS Titanic.

The game is based on the experiences of Robert Ballard. Ballard commented that "My main goal for this CD-ROM was to bring alive all the challenges, intense excitement and triumphs that I experienced during my many voyages of undersea exploration". The game was "developed over two years by 40 Russian scientists".

LearningWare Reviews felt that the game was a "spectacular" idea but very challenging. PC World thought that an intriguing premise had been let down by poor execution. CBS quoted Ballard as saying that he praised the game's graphical realism. Chicago Tribune deemed it "sophisticated and thoroughly engaging". Praising the game, Washington Post noted how "Few people make coffee-table CD-ROMs like this anymore". PC Mag described the game as "marvelous". Popular Science noted the game's realism.
