= Renée Carl =

French actress (1875–1954)

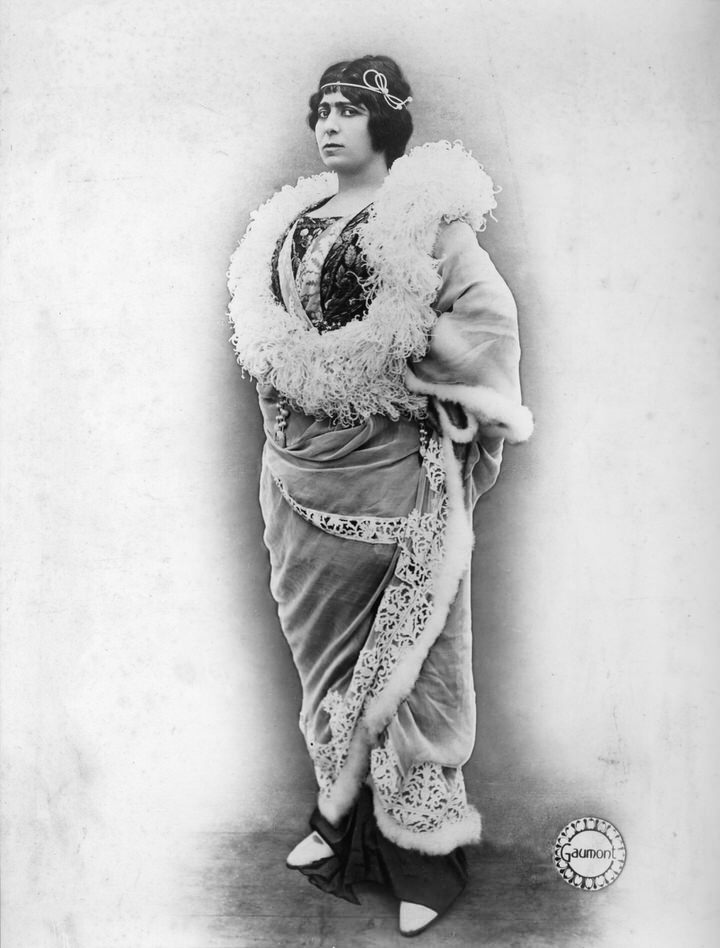
- Born: Renée Henriette Emilie Grolleau; 10 June 1875; Fontenay-le-Comte, Vendée, France
- Died: 31 July 1954 (aged 79); Paris, France
- Occupation: Actress
- Years active: 1907–1937

Renée Carl (10 June 1875 – 31 July 1954) was a French actress of the silent era. She was born in Fontenay-le-Comte, Vendée, France, and died in Paris, France.

Between 1907 and 1937, she appeared in 186 films. A favorite of film director Louis Feuillade, she appeared in at least 150 films directed by him, including the short Bébé and Bout de Zan comedies. Of the many characters she played in Feuillade's films, perhaps her most famous portrayal was that of Lady Beltham, mistress of the notorious Fantômas in the serial of the same name. She makes an uncredited appearance, as "L'Andalouse," in Les Vampires.

In 1922, she directed and starred in the film A Shout from the Abyss, also known as Un cri dans l'abîme. In a 1924 interview for Mon Ciné magazine, she stated that she was introduced to film-making through her friend Léonie Richard.

== Selected filmography ==
- Fantômas (1913)
- Les Vampires (1915)
- Les Misérables (1925)
- Colette the Unwanted (1927)
- Pépé le Moko (1937)
