= The Convergence of the Twain =

1912 poem

"The Convergence of the Twain (Lines on the loss of the Titanic)" is a poem by Thomas Hardy, published in 1912. The poem describes the sinking and wreckage of the ocean liner RMS Titanic. "Convergence" is written in tercets and consists of eleven stanzas (I to XI), following the AAA rhyme pattern.

== Themes and structure ==
I
In a solitude of the sea
Deep from human vanity,
And the Pride of Life that planned her, stilly couches she.

II
Steel chambers, late the pyres
Of her salamandrine fires,
Cold currents thrid, and turn to rhythmic tidal lyres.

III
Over the mirrors meant
To glass the opulent
The sea-worm crawls—grotesque, slimed, dumb, indifferent.

IV
Jewels in joy designed
To ravish the sensuous mind
Lie lightless, all their sparkles bleared and black and blind.

V
Dim moon-eyed fishes near
Gaze at the gilded gear
And query: "What does this vaingloriousness down here?" ...

VI
Well: while was fashioning
This creature of cleaving wing,
The Immanent Will that stirs and urges everything

VII
Prepared a sinister mate
For her—so gaily great—
A Shape of Ice, for the time far and dissociate.

VIII
And as the smart ship grew
In stature, grace, and hue,
In shadowy silent distance grew the Iceberg too.

IX
Alien they seemed to be:
No mortal eye could see
The intimate welding of their later history.

X
Or sign that they were bent
By paths coincident
On being anon twin halves of one august event,

XI
Till the Spinner of the Years
Said "Now!" And each one hears,
And consummation comes, and jars two hemispheres.

One interpretation is that Hardy's controversial poem contrasts the materialism and hubris of mankind with the integrity and beauty of nature. This is accomplished in an almost satirical manner, given the absence of compassion and not even any reference to the huge loss of life that accompanied the ship's sinking. It is also possible that Hardy, who aspired to become an architect but lacked the resources to do so, criticizes what to him seem the unnecessary pursuits of wealthy people, epitomized in the building of such an enormous luxury vessel. The references in the first stanza to "human vanity" and "the Pride of Life that planned her" support such an interpretation.

The reader might expect to see grief, a depiction of the chaos, or an emotive telling of individual losses. The poem fails to fulfil such expectations, instead focusing on the ship and the iceberg and how the two came to converge.

Seen as the epitome of Britain's wealth and power, the Titanic was extravagantly appointed for the British and American rich, and exhibited the new technology and fashions of the day. In the eyes of its makers the ship was unsinkable. Critic Peter Childs describes the Titanic as "full of Edwardian confidence but bound for disaster" and it is this display of vanity and pride that Hardy sardonically highlights in the first five stanzas, as he contrasts the ship's current position at the bottom of the Atlantic Ocean to its glorious construction and launch. By juxtaposing expensive items like the "jewels in joy designed" with their sea-bed position where they "lie lightless, all their sparkles bleared and black and blind" (IV, 12), Hardy emphasises the immense waste caused by the sinking. Another stanza has: "Dim moon-eyed fishes near/Gaze at the gilded gear/And query: "What does this vaingloriousness down here?"

At the beginning of the sixth stanza, there is a definite shift where Hardy goes from looking at the ship's past and present to discussing the cause of the disaster, the collision of the ship and the iceberg. The pairing of the two or the idea of a pair is constructed before the poem even starts. In the title, 'Twain', the archaic word for 'two' is used, generating the idea of a pairing, with the most obvious pair being the ship and the iceberg. From the sixth stanza onwards, Hardy's lexis suggests that the 'convergence' of the two forces was predestined, an unavoidable event premeditated by some hidden, uncontrollable force which is indicated in phrases like "The Immanent Will" (VI, 18) and "the Spinner of Years" (XI, 31). Although these phrases are used in his novels to denote the forces that work in human life, in the poem the unspoken force Hardy suggests may be nature; the pairing of human technology and nature can be seen quite clearly in the poem with all the new technologies of humans set against the bigger force of nature. Hardy discusses that whilst the Titanic was being built, nature too "prepared a sinister mate" (VII, 19) and, in the next stanza, Hardy creates a sense of menace in the lines "And as the smart ship grew/In stature, grace and hue/In shadowy silent distance grew the Iceberg too" (VIII, 22 – 24).

Whilst critic Chris Baldick claims Hardy's poem "alludes to a philosophical stance" and that it "carefully refrains from moralizing", fellow critic Donald Davie claims the poem "very markedly censures the vanity and luxury which created and inhabited the staterooms of the ocean liner", therefore suggesting Hardy does moralize.

Unspoken expectations of the poem are left unfulfilled. Rather than offering the reader comfort, someone to blame or emotive passenger stories, Hardy leaves the reader with an overwhelming sense of insignificance, depicting man's highest technological achievement as easily beaten by nature. Humans will always be subject to nature, which is unsympathetic to "human vanity" (I, 2) and "Pride of Life" (I, 3).

The stanzas, with their long third lines, are shaped like the Titanic and the Iceberg: there is more below the surface than above. The poem stresses the idea of two in 'twain', 'twin halves', 'sinister mate', 'two hemispheres', 'consummation', but there are an odd number, XI, of the strongly numbered stanzas because only the iceberg survives the collision. The stanza numbers act to separate the stanzas, especially where there is interstanza enjambment between VI and VII, emphasising the idea of separate things that will be brought together by fate.

== Related works ==
Simon Armitage also wrote a poem called "The Convergence of the Twain", mimicking Hardy's style, but describing the events of 9/11.

In 2012 composer James Burton conducted the world premiere of his new composition The Convergence of the Twain, a setting of the Hardy poem, at the St Endellion Music Festivals in Cornwall, in commemoration of the 100th anniversary of the sinking of the Titanic.
