= Titanic: Honor and Glory =

- Developer: Vintage Digital Revival
- Publisher: Vintage Digital Revival
- Director: James Penca
- Producers: Matt DeWinkeleer; Kyle Hudak
- Programmer: Derek Verveer
- Artists: Giovanni Castro; Nicolas Murgia
- Composer: Anthony Casalena
- Engine: Unreal Engine 5
- Platforms: macOS; Windows

Titanic: Honor and Glory is an upcoming video game by Vintage Digital Revival. In development since 2012, the game is to feature a complete digital recreation of the RMS Titanic. The most recent demonstration for the game was released on March 3, 2023, allowing players to explore approximately half the ship.

== Gameplay ==
The game is expected to include a fully explorable digital recreation of the Titanic, including a tour mode, log entries, and collectibles.

== Development ==
Development of the game began in November 2012, after the cancellation of the Titanic: Lost in the Darkness mod for Crysis 2. On December 25, 2012, the first preview of the game was released, showing a fly through of the Grand Staircase and using CryEngine 3 to develop the game, which would later be switched over to Unreal Engine 4.

The first preview of the game in Unreal Engine 4 was uploaded to YouTube in March 2015, showing an early sinking animation of the D-Deck Reception in real-time. In April later that year, a playable demo was released, which featured select areas of the ship including the D-Deck Reception, Scotland Road, and the Turkish Bath. In July, a podcast was held to provide updates on the project. During the podcast, several preview screenshots of the current state of the Grand Staircase were released. That same day, the official forums were launched. By the next day, however, the forums had been taken down.

For the project's research, the developers tracked down obscure artifacts or preserved pieces of Titanic's sister ship Olympic in order to ensure proper recreations. In November 2015, game producers Thomas Lynskey and Matthew DeWinkeleer went on an 11-day research trip to England. Highlights of the trip included visiting the Grapes Pub in Southampton, which was to be depicted in the game, and measuring the wooden panelling of the RMS Olympic's original first class lounge, which serves as the dining room of the White Swan Hotel in Alnwick.

To coincide with the 104th anniversary of the tragedy, on April 14, 2016, the developers uploaded a real-time animation video showing the sinking of the Titanic to their official YouTube channel . That same evening, a live podcast was held in which the team commented on the video as they and the listeners watched it together. The video received coverage on many news websites. It received an overall positive reception from historians and the public alike.

The developers announced their partnership with "5518 Studios", a video game art-house, in July 2019, to develop the NPCs for the game.

A sister project entitled Britannic: Patroness of the Mediterranean was released to Steam on June 19, 2020. In addition to having support for virtual reality headsets, the game includes Britannic in both her civilian and hospital ship livery.

In a livestream from the development team, a free-to-play Alpha version of Titanic: Honor and Glory was announced. A release date is yet to be announced.

Prior to the departure of Tom Lynskey from the project in 2021, the game's story was to focus on a fictional 23-year-old American Oxford University graduate named Owen Robert Morgan. After being mistaken for an international criminal, he must board the RMS Titanic in an effort to clear his name and to find the real culprits. Once the player boarded the ship, the player would have needed to perform certain tasks of a real crewman and secure a cabin of his own, and when the Titanic would hit the iceberg, the player was planned to have had two hours and forty minutes to solve the mystery. These plans were scrapped in favor of a different direction for the game, which would feature the ship as a virtual museum.

On May 4, 2025, assets from the Titanic: Honor and Glory demos were leaked onto Sketchfab, uploaded as free assets by a user impersonating content creator Jude Johnstone. The uploads often included harmful comments and failed to credit Titanic: Honor and Glory, potentially leading users to unknowingly download the game's proprietary content. The identity of the leaker was not confirmed. In response to the incident, the developers announced they were exploring encryption technologies to help prevent future leaks. The incident was discussed in a Reddit post by Johnstone, who denied involvement and provided additional context.

=== Project 401 and the future ===
An extensive demo, titled Titanic: Honor and Glory - Demo 401, or Megademo colloquially, was released on December 25, 2021. Utilizing Unreal Engine 4, the demo initially included 25% of the Titanic in a single level before subsequent updates expanded the number of areas to 30% of the ship.

As of August 22, 2022, the main project, Titanic: Honor and Glory, and Demo 401, now called Project 401, were officially separated. Creative Director James Penca acknowledged the delay in development and several times of silence from the team, stating, "[For 401], we decided that instead of making you wait until the ship was 100 percent completed, we would open the alpha stage of development and allow [fans] to explore areas we had finished while we work on the next areas... essentially, opening up the development of the game to our fans."

A remastered demo, Demo 401 V2.0, was released on March 3, 2023. Switching to Unreal Engine 5, it is the largest demo of the game released, covering 50% of the ship.
