= Deaths in March 1998 =

The following is a list of notable deaths in March 1998.

Entries for each day are listed alphabetically by surname. A typical entry lists information in the following sequence:

- Name, age, country of citizenship at birth, subsequent country of citizenship (if applicable), reason for notability, cause of death (if known), and reference.

== March 1998 ==
=== 1 ===
- Jean Marie Balland, 63, French Roman Catholic cardinal, lung cancer.
- Miltiades Caridis, 74, German-Greek conductor, stroke.
- Isidro Figueras, 85, Spanish racing cyclist.
- Archie Goodwin, 60, American comic book writer and artist (Luke Cage, Spider-Man, Star Wars), cancer.
- Manolis Hatzidakis, 89, Greek art historian and Byzantinist.
- Aat van Noort, 89, Dutch Olympic middle-distance runner (1928).
- Alexander Puzanov, 91, Soviet and Russian ambassador and statesman.
- Sabina Sesselmann, 61, German film actress.
- Garner E. Shriver, 85, American politician, member of the United States House of Representatives (1961-1977).
- Robert Symonette, 73, Bahamian yachtsman, politician, and Olympian (1960, 1964, 1972).

=== 2 ===
- Leif Blomberg, 57, Swedish politician.
- Lucien Bodard, 84, French writer and journalist.
- Slick Castleman, 84, American Major League Baseball player (New York Giants).
- Henry Steele Commager, 95, American historian, pneumonia.
- Robert A. Grant, 92, American judge and politician.
- Maamun al-Kuzbari, 83/84, Syrian politician and literary personality.
- Darcy O'Brien, 58, American author and literary critic, heart attack.
- Ilias Papageorgiou, 72-73, Greek footballer and Olympian (1952).
- Herbie Seneviratne, 72, Sri Lankan actor and filmmaker.
- Marzette Watts, 59, American jazz tenor and soprano saxophonist.

=== 3 ===
- Janet Burston, 63, American child actress, cancer.
- Giuseppe Caron, 94, Italian politician.
- Marcel Dionne, 66, Canadian politician, member of the House of Commons of Canada (1979-1984).
- Fred W. Friendly, 82, American television journalist and executive, stroke.
- Edward Luckhoo, 85, Guyanese Governor General.
- Hedley Mattingly, 82, British actor, cancer.
- Charles Franklin Phillips, 87, American economist.
- Marc Sautet, 51, French writer, translator, and philosopher, brain cancer.

=== 4 ===
- Antonio Alsúa Alonso, 78, Spanish football player.
- Betty Bird, 96, Austrian actress.
- Jim Cullom, 72, American gridiron football player (New York Yanks).
- Ivan Dougherty, 90, Australian Army officer.
- Van Edmondson, 98, American football player.
- Alfred Evans, 77, South African Olympic sailor (1956).
- Arsène Lucchini, 75, French Olympic ski jumper (1948).
- Aulis Reinikka, 82, Finnish Olympic athlete (1936).
- Jules Fontaine Sambwa, 57, Zairean and Congolese politician and economist.

=== 5 ===
- Egon Bazini, 86, Hungarian Olympic rower (1936).
- Bob Beveridge, 88, English cricketer.
- Donald James Cannon, 78, American politician.
- Carleton Putnam, 96, American businessman, writer and segregationist, pneumonia.
- Jerome Walters, 67, American Olympic middle distance runner (1956).
- Donald Woods, 91, Canadian-born American actor.

=== 6 ===
- John Allin, 76, American Anglican bishop.
- Rue Barclay, 76, American Country & Western musician.
- Frank Barrett, 84, American baseball player
- Benjamin Bowden, 91, British industrial designer.
- Ben Chase, 74, American football player (Detroit Lions).
- Joe Shear, 54, American stock car racing driver, cancer.
- Vanna Vanni, 83, Italian film actress.

=== 7 ===
- Ziad Rafiq Beydoun, Lebanese petroleum geologist.
- Bill Cable, 51, American actor, model and stunt performer, traffic collision.
- Josep Escolà, 83, Spanish footballer.
- Karen Holtsmark, 90, Norwegian painter.
- Adem Jashari, 42, Kosovo Albanian militant separatist, mortar strike.
- Hamëz Jashari, 48, Kosovar Albanian nationalist and guerilla, killed in action.
- Eleanor Ileen Johnson, 87, American survivor of the sinking of RMS Titanic.
- Don Kirkham, 90, American physicists and soil scientist.
- Janko Mežik, 76, Slovenian Olympic ski jumper (1948).
- Jack Perkins, 76, American film actor.
- Leonie Rysanek, 71, Austrian dramatic soprano, bone cancer.
- Winifred Silverthorne, 73, British figure skater and Olympian (1948).
- Wanda Tettoni, 87, Italian actress and voice actress.

=== 8 ===
- Laurie Beechman, 44, American actress and singer, cancer.
- Alexandre Gemignani, 72, Brazilian basketball player and Olympian (1948).
- James Haggarty, 83, Canadian ice hockey player (Montreal Canadiens), and Olympian (1936).
- Jack Donaldson, Baron Donaldson of Kingsbridge, 90, British politician and public servant.
- Jack McQuillan, 77, Irish politician, trade unionist and army officer.
- Peter Nilson, 60, Swedish astronomer and novelist.
- Ray Nitschke, 61, American football player (Green Bay Packers) and member of the Pro Football Hall of Fame, heart attack.
- Susanne Ussing, 57, Danish artist, architect and ceramicist.
- Jorge Wilson, 83, Argentine Olympic field hockey player (1948).

=== 9 ===
- David MacAdam, 87, American physicist and color scientist.
- Anna Maria Ortese, 83, Italian novelist, poet, and travel writer.
- Colin Patterson, 64, British palaeontologist, heart attack.
- Ulrich Schamoni, 58, German film director, screenwriter, actor and media proprietor, cancer.

=== 10 ===
- C. E. Beeby, 95, New Zealand educationalist and psychologist.
- Ilse Bing, 98, German photographer.
- Lloyd Bridges, 85, American actor (Airplane!, Sea Hunt, Hot Shots!).
- Karekin II Kazanjian, 70, Armenian Patriarch of Constantinople, liver cancer.
- Hayim David HaLevi, 74, Israeli rabbi.
- Alonzo Hicks, 76, American baseball player.
- Milton Mallawarachchi, 52, Sri Lankan singer and musician.
- Alberto Morrocco, 80, Scottish artist.
- Richard Plant, 87, German-American historian, Holocaust scholar and writer.
- Kenkō Satoshi, 30, Japanese Sumo wrestler, pulmonary embolism.
- Ed Walczak, 82, American baseball player (Philadelphia Phillies).

=== 11 ===
- Van E. Chandler, 73, American Air Force pilot and flying ace, cancer.
- Basil Coetzee, 54, South African musician, cancer.
- Buddy Jeannette, 80, American basketball player and coach, stroke.
- José Laurel, Jr., 85, Filipino politician, pneumonia.
- Manuel Piñeiro Losada, 64, Cuban revolutionary, politician and spymaster, traffic collision.
- Sachio Sakai, 72, Japanese actor.
- Nino Konis Santana, 41, East Timorese freedom fighter, killed in action.
- Jean Shiley, 86, American high jumper and Olympian (1928, 1932).
- Koos Verdam, 83, Dutch politician.

=== 12 ===
- Thomas Christiansen, 78, Danish Olympic diver (1948, 1952).
- Ovid Demaris, 78, American writer and journalist.
- Karrell Fox, 70, American magician and television performer.
- Jozef Kroner, 73, Slovak actor (The Shop on Main Street).
- Red Richards, 85, American jazz pianist.
- Kate Ross, 41, American mystery author, breast cancer.
- Lawrence Trussell, 89, American politician.
- Beatrice Wood, 105, American artist and ceramicist.

=== 13 ===
- Judge Dread, 52, English musician, heart attack.
- Peter Feller, 78, American theatrical set builder.
- Philip Gale, 19, American Internet software pioneer and computer prodigy, suicide by jumping.
- Claudio Gora, 84, Italian actor and film director.
- Shiro Kashiwa, 85, American lawyer and judge.
- Dave Lewis, 59, American rock and R&B musician, cancer.
- Bill Reid, 78, Canadian artist, Parkinson's disease.
- Risen Star, 12, American thoroughbred racehorse.
- Anne Sayre, 74, American writer.
- Peter Sillett, 65, England footballer, cancer.
- Kōshō Uchiyama, 86, Japanese buddhist monk and origami master.
- Frano Vodopivec, 73, Croatian cinematographer.
- Hans von Ohain, 86, German physicist and jet engine designer, thyroiditis.
- Ma Yueliang, 96, Chinese martial artist.

=== 14 ===
- Abdul Rahman al-Iryani, 87, President of the Yemen Arab Republic.
- Ed Boell, 81, American football player, coach, and official.
- Hugh Coveney, 62, Irish politician, fall.
- Dinorah Enríquez, 51, Puerto Rican fencer and Olympian (1976).
- Dada Kondke, 65, Indian actor and film producer.
- Dave Minor, 76, American basketball player (Baltimore Bullets, Milwaukee Hawks).
- Leo Sotorník, 71, Czech gymnast and Olympian (1948, 1952).

=== 15 ===
- Malati Choudhury, 93, Indian civil rights and freedom activist.
- Marty Comer, 80, American football player (Buffalo Bills).
- Tim Maia, 55, Brazilian musician and songwriter, cardiovascular disease.
- Maud Mannoni, 74, Belgian-French psychoanalyst.
- Jack McIntyre, 67, Canadian ice hockey player (Boston Bruins, Chicago Black Hawks, Detroit Red Wings).
- Dušan Pašek, 37, Slovak ice hockey player (Minnesota North Stars), and Olympian (1984, 1988), suicide by gunshot.
- Felto Prewitt, 73, American football player (Buffalo Bisons/Bills, Baltimore Colts).
- Jheri Redding, 91, American hairdresser and businessman.
- Carolyn Schnurer, 90, American fashion designer and sportswear pioneer.
- Benjamin Spock, 94, American pediatrician, author, and Olympic rower (1924).
- Gennady Yevryuzhikhin, 54, Russian football player and Olympian (1972).

=== 16 ===
- Derek Barton, 79, British chemist, Nobel Prize laureate.
- Pertev Naili Boratav, 90, Turkish folklorist.
- Esther Bubley, 77, American photographer, cancer.
- Lydia Délrctorsckaya, 87, Russian-French refugee and model.
- Bob Hess, 87, American wrestler and Olympian (1932).
- Noel Stephen Paynter, 99, British chief intelligence officer of Bomber Command during World War II.

=== 17 ===
- Cliff Barker, 77, American college basketball player (Kentucky Wildcats), and Olympian (1948).
- Alain Bosquet, 78, French poet.
- Milo Candini, 80, American baseball player (Washington Senators, Philadelphia Phillies).
- Douglas Harold Copp, 83, Canadian scientist.
- Ed Finney, 73, American baseball player.
- Bernarr Rainbow, 83, British historian of music education, and choir master.
- Helen Westcott, 70, American actor and former child actor, cancer.
- Dorothy Weston, 98, Australian tennis player.

=== 18 ===
- László Bakos, 78, Hungarian Olympic wrestler (1948).
- Siegfried Franz, 84, German composer of film and television scores.
- Joan Freeman, 80, Australian physicist.
- Irving Hill, 83, American district judge (United States District Court for the Central District of California).
- Ted Jolliffe, 89, Canadian politician.
- Klaus Mollenhauer, 69, German pedagogical theorist.
- Hideo Shima, 96, Japanese engineer and bullet train pioneer.
- Dwight Sloan, 83, American gridiron football player (Chicago Cardinals, Detroit Lions).
- Robert E. Woodside, 93, American politician and judge.

=== 19 ===
- Simon Diedong Dombo, Ghanaian politician and king.
- Samuel Dzhundrin, 77, Bulgarian Roman Catholic prelate and monk.
- Klaus Havenstein, 75, German actor, cabaret artist, and television presenter.
- E. M. S. Namboodiripad, 88, Indian communist politician and theorist.
- Jimmy Scoular, 73, Scottish football player and manager.
- Hanzade Sultan, 74, Ottoman princess and Turkish expatriate.

=== 20 ===
- B. N. Adarkar, 87, Indian economist.
- Yemima Avidar-Tchernovitz, 88, Israeli author.
- Beverley Cross, 66, English playwright, librettist and screenwriter (Clash of the Titans, Jason and the Argonauts).
- Anthony Fell, 83, British politician.
- Agustín Gómez-Arcos, 65, Spanish writer, cancer.
- George Howard, 41, American jazz saxophonist, colon cancer.
- Laddie Lucas, 82, British Air Force officer and politician.
- Beth Mitchell, 25, American shag dancer and elementary school teacher.
- Catherine Sauvage, 68, French singer and actress.
- Ivor Slaney, 76, British musical composer and conductor.
- Maciej Słomczyński, 75, Polish translator and writer.

=== 21 ===
- Ben Bagley, 64, American record producer and musical producer.
- Horst Korsching, 85, German physicist.
- Ramanathapuram C S Murugabhoopathy, 84, Indian Mridanga maestro.
- Maciej Słomczyński, 75, Polish writer and translator.
- Galina Ulanova, 88, Russian ballet dancer.

=== 22 ===
- Bruce Arthur, 76, Australian wrestler and Olympian (1948).
- Simon Wingfield Digby, 88, British politician.
- János Dosztály, 78, Hungarian Olympic sports shooter (1952, 1960).
- Jack R. Howard, 87, American broadcasting executive.
- John Richard Keating, 63, American prelate of the Roman Catholic Church.
- Shoichi Nishimura, Japanese football player, manager, and Olympian (1936), pneumonia.
- Rube Reiswerg, 85, American basketball player.

=== 23 ===
- Louis Arbessier, 90, French actor.
- Ray Gillam, 88, Australian rugby league footballer.
- Chuck Hunsinger, 72, American gridiron football player (Chicago Bears).
- Tomasz Jasiński, 81, Polish ice hockey player and Olympian (1948).
- Gentry Jessup, 83, American baseball player.
- Thomas MacDonald, 89, Irish cricketer.
- Hilda Morley, 81, American poet.
- Ray Scott, 78, American sportscaster.
- Gerald Stano, 46, American serial killer, execution by electric chair.
- Marie-Laure Tardieu-Blot, 95, French botanist and pteridologist.

=== 24 ===
- Åke Mangård, 81, Swedish Air Force major general.
- António Ribeiro, 69, Portuguese Cardinal of the Roman Catholic Church, cancer.
- Torben Tryde, 81, Danish writer, Olympian (1948), and resistance fighter during World War II.
- Jill Ann Weatherwax, 27, American model and aspiring singer, stabbed.

=== 25 ===
- Antoni Gościański, 72, Polish Olympic boxer (1952).
- Daniel Massey, 64, English actor and performer, Hodgkin's lymphoma.
- Clive Osborne, 75, Australian politician.
- Asha Posley, 71, Pakistani actress, she acted in Pakistani's first film Teri Yaad
- Micheál Prendergast, 77, Irish farmer, businessman and politician.
- Steven Schiff, 51, American politician, squamous-cell carcinoma, skin cancer.
- Chris Trickle, 25, American stock car racing driver, drive-by shooting.
- Wilfred Watson, 86, Canadian professor and author.
- Betsey Cushing Roosevelt Whitney, 88, American philanthropist.

=== 26 ===
- Denis Charles, 64, American jazz drummer, pneumonia.
- Shantinath Desai, 69, Indian author.
- Nikolay Dubinin, 91, Soviet and Russian biologist and academician.
- Arthur S. Link, 77, American historian and educator, lung cancer.
- Rukhsana Naz, 19, British Pakistani murder victim.
- Kate Cruise O'Brien, 49, Irish writer.

=== 27 ===
- Nadija Hordijenko Andrianova, 76, Ukrainian writer and translator of the language Esperanto.
- Julio César Britos, 71, Uruguayan football player.
- John William Comber, 92, American Catholic missionary and bishop.
- Joan Lestor, Baroness Lestor of Eccles, 66, British politician, ALS.
- Chen Jin, 90, Taiwanese painter.
- Aghajani Kashmeri, 89, Indian screenwriter, actor and Urdu poet.
- Joan Maynard, 76, English politician and trade unionist, cancer.
- David McClelland, 80, American psychologist.
- Steve Nemeth, 75, American gridiron football player (Cleveland Rams, Chicago Rockets, Baltimore Colts).
- Ferry Porsche, 88, Austrian auto designer and businessman.
- Carlos Reed, 81, Chilean Olympic swimmer (1936).
- Otto Freiherr von Feury, 91, German politician.
- Karl-Adolf Zenker, 90, German officer in the Kriegsmarine during World War II.

=== 28 ===
- Else Elster, 88, German actress.
- Albert Levan, 93, Swedish botanist and geneticist.
- Tadao Okayama, 84, Japanese Olympic cross-country skier (1936).
- David Powers, 85, Special Assistant and secretary to John F. Kennedy.
- Larry Stephens, 59, American gridiron football player (Cleveland Browns, Los Angeles Rams, Dallas Cowboys).

=== 29 ===
- Giuliano Biagetti, 72, Italian film director and screenwriter.
- Kvitka Cisyk, 44, American coloratura soprano, breast cancer.
- David Nightingale Hicks, 69, English interior decorator and designer, lung cancer.
- Ben Krentzman, 84, American district judge (United States District Court for the Middle District of Florida).
- Loreta, 86-87, Iranian Armenian actress.
- Dick Phillips, 66, American baseball player (San Francisco Giants, Washington Senators), manager and coach.
- Eugene Walter, 76, American screenwriter, poet, actor, puppeteer and chef, liver cancer.
- Harold E. Wilson, 76, United States Marine and recipient of the Medal of Honor.
- Dudley Wysong, 58, American golfer, aneurysm.

=== 30 ===
- Ramsay Ames, 79, 1940s American B movie actress, model, pin-up girl and television host, lung cancer.
- Michèle Arnaud, 79, French singer and director.
- Judy Buenoano, 54, American convicted murderer, execution by electric chair.
- Max Cosyns, 91, Belgian physicist, inventor and explorer.
- Lloyd Finkbeiner, 77, Canadian ice hockey player (New York Americans).
- Massimo Franciosa, 73, Italian screenwriter and film director.
- Frank King, 79, British Army officer.
- Mordechai Olmert, 90, Israeli politician.
- Athelstan Spilhaus, 86, South African-American geophysicist and oceanographer.

=== 31 ===
- Bella Abzug, 77, American lawyer, politician and social activist.
- John H. Cooke, 86, American lawyer and politician.
- Tim Flock, 73, American racecar driver and member of the NASCAR Hall of Fame, liver and throat cancer.
- Henry George Glyde, 91, Canadian painter.
- Blanche Montel, 95, French actress.
- Joel Ryce-Menuhin, 64, American pianist, cancer.
- Pete Tillman, 75, American football player (Baltimore Colts), and coach.
