= Uppsala General Catalogue =

Catalogue of galaxies visible from the northern hemisphere

The Uppsala General Catalogue of Galaxies (UGC) is a catalogue of 12,921 galaxies visible from the northern hemisphere. It was first published in 1973.

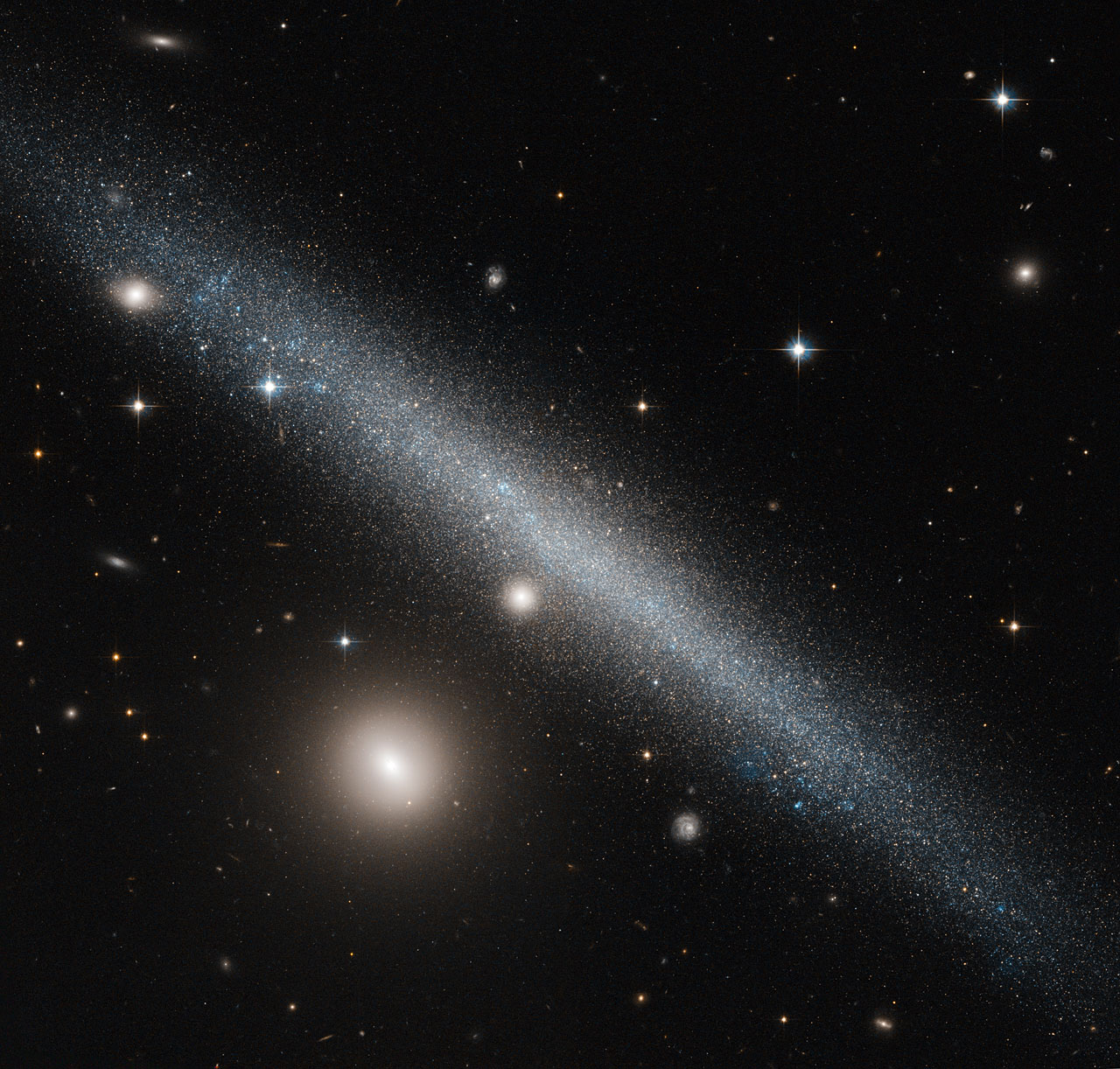
Dwarf galaxy UGC 1281.

The catalogue includes essentially all galaxies north of declination −02°30′ and to a limiting diameter of 1.0 arcminute or to a limiting apparent magnitude of 14.5. The primary source of data is the blue prints of the Palomar Observatory Sky Survey (POSS). It also includes galaxies smaller than 1.0 arcminute in diameter but brighter than 14.5 magnitude from the Catalogue of Galaxies and of Clusters of Galaxies (CGCG).

The catalogue contains descriptions of the galaxies and their surrounding areas, plus conventional system classifications and position angles for flattened galaxies. Galaxy diameters are included and the classifications and descriptions are given in such a way as to provide as accurate an account as possible of the appearance of the galaxies on the prints. The accuracy of coordinates is only what is necessary for identification purposes. The catalogue was edited by Peter Nilson, at the time Doctor of Astronomy and a researcher at Uppsala, who had already published some essays about the history of his science. A couple of years later he left his career as a professional astronomer and became a full-time writer, novelist and essayist, although the relationship of humans to space and cosmology, and the history of science, remained powerful themes in his later writing.

== Addendum ==
There is an addendum to the catalogue called Uppsala General Catalogue Addendum, which is abbreviated as UGCA, and contains 444 galaxies.

== See also ==
- List of astronomical catalogues
- Uppsala
- Uppsala Astronomical Observatory
- Royal Society of Sciences in Uppsala
- Principal Galaxies Catalogue
