= Fred S. Jackson =

American politician (1868–1931)

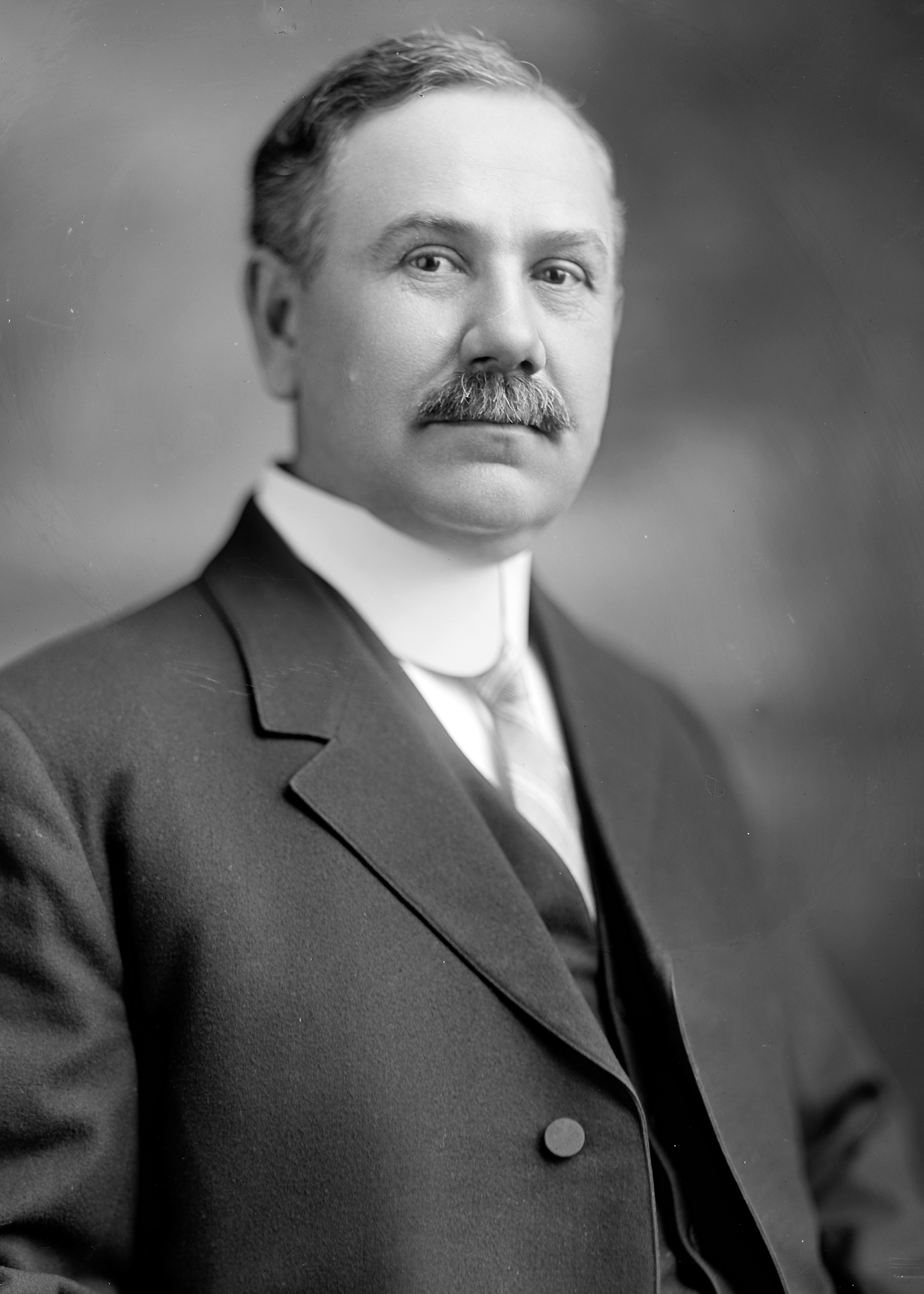

Member of the U.S. House of Representatives from Kansas's 4th district
- In office March 4, 1911 – March 3, 1913
- Preceded by: James Monroe Miller
- Succeeded by: Dudley Doolittle

21st Kansas Attorney General
- In office January 14, 1907 – January 9, 1911
- Governor: Edward W. Hoch; Walter R. Stubbs
- Preceded by: Chiles Crittendon Coleman
- Succeeded by: John Shaw Dawson

Personal details
- Born: Fred Schuyler Jackson; April 19, 1868 Stanton, Kansas
- Died: November 21, 1931 (aged 63) Topeka, Kansas
- Resting place: Greenwood Cemetery, Eureka, Kansas
- Party: Republican

Fred Schuyler Jackson (April 19, 1868 – November 21, 1931) was an American lawyer and politician who served one term as a U.S. representative from Kansas from 1911 to 1913.

== Biography ==
Born in Stanton, Kansas, Jackson moved to Greenwood County, Kansas, with his parents in 1881. He attended the public schools of Miami and Greenwood Counties. He taught school in Kansas from 1885 to 1890. He was graduated in law from the University of Kansas at Lawrence in 1892. He was admitted to the bar and commenced practice in Eureka, Kansas.

=== Early career ===
He served as prosecuting attorney of Greenwood County from 1893 to 1897. He served as assistant State attorney general in 1906 and 1907. He was state Attorney General from 1907 to 1911.

=== Congress ===
Jackson was elected as a Republican to the Sixty-second Congress (March 4, 1911 – March 3, 1913).

He was an unsuccessful candidate for reelection in 1912 to the Sixty-third Congress.

=== Later career ===
He resumed the practice of law in Eureka and Topeka, Kansas. He moved to Topeka, Kansas, in 1915, having been appointed attorney for the Public Utilities Commission of Kansas and served until 1924. He resumed the practice of law in Topeka, Kansas.

He also engaged in agricultural pursuits and stock raising in Greenwood, Wabaunsee, and Jefferson Counties.

== Death and burial ==
He died in Topeka, Kansas on November 21, 1931. He was interred in Greenwood Cemetery, Eureka, Kansas.

Legal offices
Preceded by Chiles Crittendon Coleman	Attorney General of Kansas; 1907–1911	Succeeded by John Shaw Dawson
U.S. House of Representatives
Preceded by James M. Miller	Member of the U.S. House of Representatives from Kansas's 3rd congressional district March 4, 1911 – March 3, 1913	Succeeded by Dudley Doolittle
