= UGC 1281 =

Dwarf galaxy in the constellation Triangulum

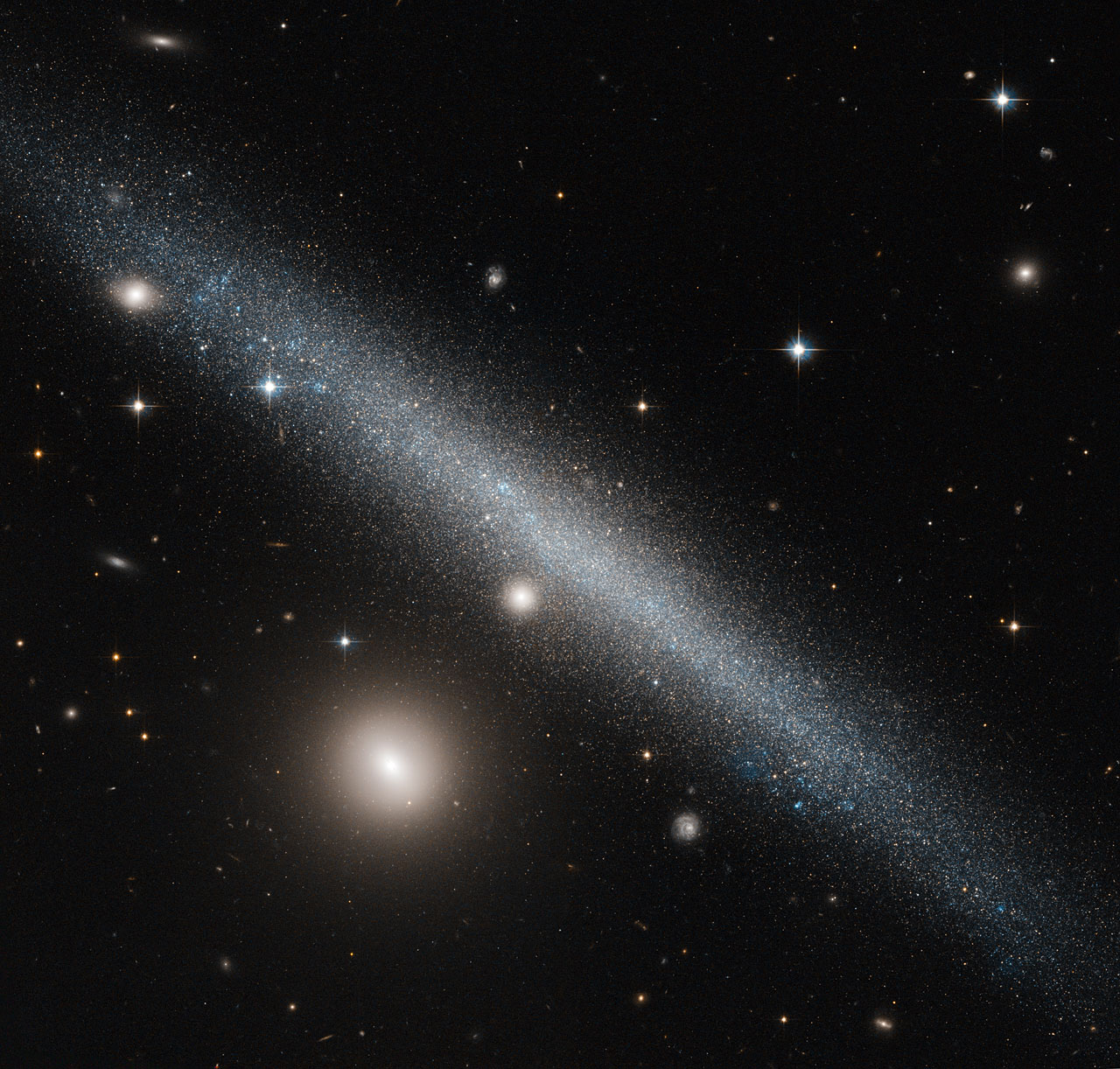
- UGC 1281 imaged by the Hubble Space Telescope. The bright patch to the lower left is companion galaxy PGC 6700.

Observation data (J2000 epoch)
- Constellation: Triangulum
- Right ascension: 01^{h} 49^{m} 31.6135^{s}
- Declination: +32° 35′ 19.525″
- Redshift: 0.000520
- Heliocentric radial velocity: 156 ± 1 km/s
- Distance: 17.86 ± 0.73 Mly (5.476 ± 0.225 Mpc)

Characteristics
- Type: Sdm
- Size: ~24,400 ly (7.49 kpc) (estimated)

Other designations
- MCG +05-05-014, PGC 6699, CGCG 503-026

UGC 1281 is a slightly warped edge on dwarf galaxy located 18 million light years from Earth in the constellation of Triangulum. It has a low surface brightness. The first known reference to this galaxy comes from Part 2 of the Morphological Catalogue of Galaxies, published in 1964, where it is listed as MCG +05-05-014.

There have been claims that UGC 1281 has a red stellar thick disk. However this claim is at odds with the low surface brightness of the galaxy.

== Star formation ==
The current star formation rate of the UGC 1281 galaxy is 0.006 solar masses per year, for comparison, the Small Magellanic Cloud (SMC) has a star formation rate of 0.046 solar masses per year. Because UGC 1281 has such a low rate of star formation, it is surprising that the galaxy is able to form bright diffuse ionized structures.

The galaxy had a period of enhanced star formation within the last 60 million years forming many blue supergiant stars.
