= Margaret Bechstein Hays =

American survivor of the Titanic sinking (1887–1956)

- Born: December 6, 1887; New York City
- Died: August 21, 1956 (aged 68); Buenos Aires, Argentina

Margaret Bechstein Hays (December 6, 1887– August 21, 1956) was a passenger on the RMS Titanic. She and her dog survived the ship's sinking, escaping on lifeboat no. 7. Following the disaster, she cared for two small children known as the "Titanic Orphans" in her New York City home until their mother claimed them.

== Rescue from the Titanic ==
Margaret Bechstein Hays was born on December 6, 1887 to Frank and Mary A. Hays. She was 24 years old when she boarded the Titanic at Cherbourg, France. She was accompanied by two friends, Olive Earnshaw and Lily Potter. Earnshaw and Hays occupied first class cabin C-54. Gilbert Tucker, a young bachelor Hays had met in Europe and who was enamoured of her, cut his visit short to join her on the Titanic. He occupied cabin C-53.

When the ship hit an iceberg on April 14, 1912, Hays and Earnshaw were in their cabin. When the engines stopped they went to Potter's room, and then to inquire about the situation. When they returned to Potter's room they told her: "We have hit an iceberg but the steward told us we should not worry and should go back to bed." Although Hays was not concerned, Potter was scared. They dressed and wrapped Hays' Pomeranian dog in blankets. They headed to C Deck, where Tucker helped them collect life jackets.

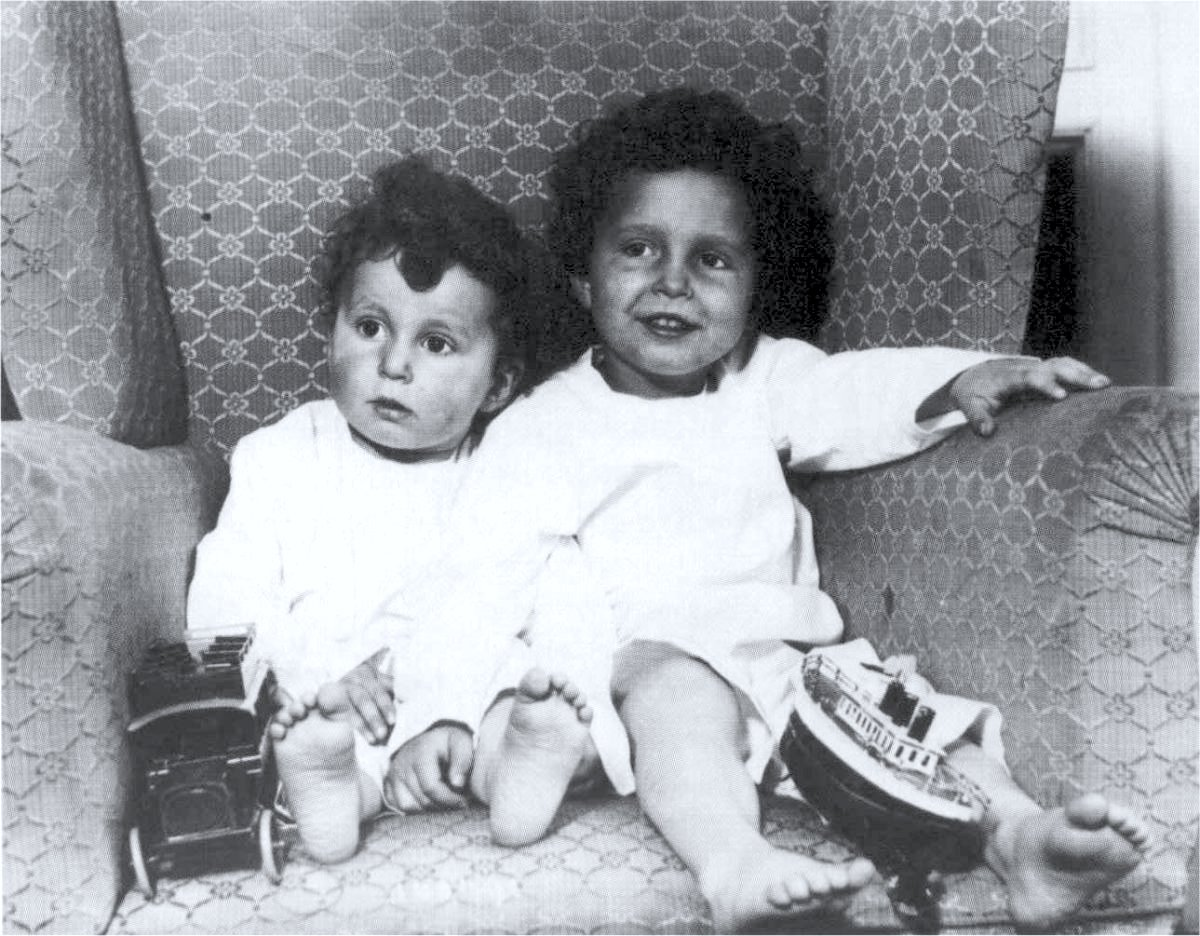
Michel, right, and his brother, Edmond, in a photograph taken to aid in their identification after the sinking

The three women and the dog boarded lifeboat no. 7, which was the first boat prepared. The occupants of boat 7 were rescued early on April 15 by the RMS Carpathia. Also on the Carpathia were two young boys who spoke only French. Margaret spoke French fluently and she was concerned that they would be separated from one another. She volunteered to take the children into her care until their family could be located. The boys played with Hays' dog while they were on the boat.

The identities of the children were initially unknown, but it was determined that they were Edmond and Michel Navratil. Their father, Michel Sr., who died in the disaster, had boarded the Titanic under an assumed name. He had taken the children from his estranged wife and was removing them to the United States. Upon her return to New York, Margaret cared for the children, who became known as the "Titanic Orphans." She had the help of the Children's Aid Society in caring for the boys until their mother, Marcelle Navratil, came from Nice, France, to claim them.

Hays's admirer Gilbert Tucker also survived the sinking. Nevertheless, Hays went on to marry a Rhode Island physician, Charles Daniel Easton, in 1913 and they had two daughters. She was widowed on October 4, 1934. Hays remained friends with Tucker and the two corresponded frequently. She died on August 21, 1956, in Buenos Aires, Argentina, of a heart attack while on a cruise vacation with one of her granddaughters. She is buried at St. Mary's Churchyard, Portsmouth, Rhode Island.

Margaret Bechstein Hays was not, as has sometimes been claimed, related to victim Charles Melville Hays, an American railroad executive traveling first class on the Titanic with his wife Clara and their adult daughter Orian (both of whom survived) and son-in-law (who perished). Mr. Hays' party was in a different group of cabins on B Deck.
