= 1948 Kansas gubernatorial election =

- November 2, 1948
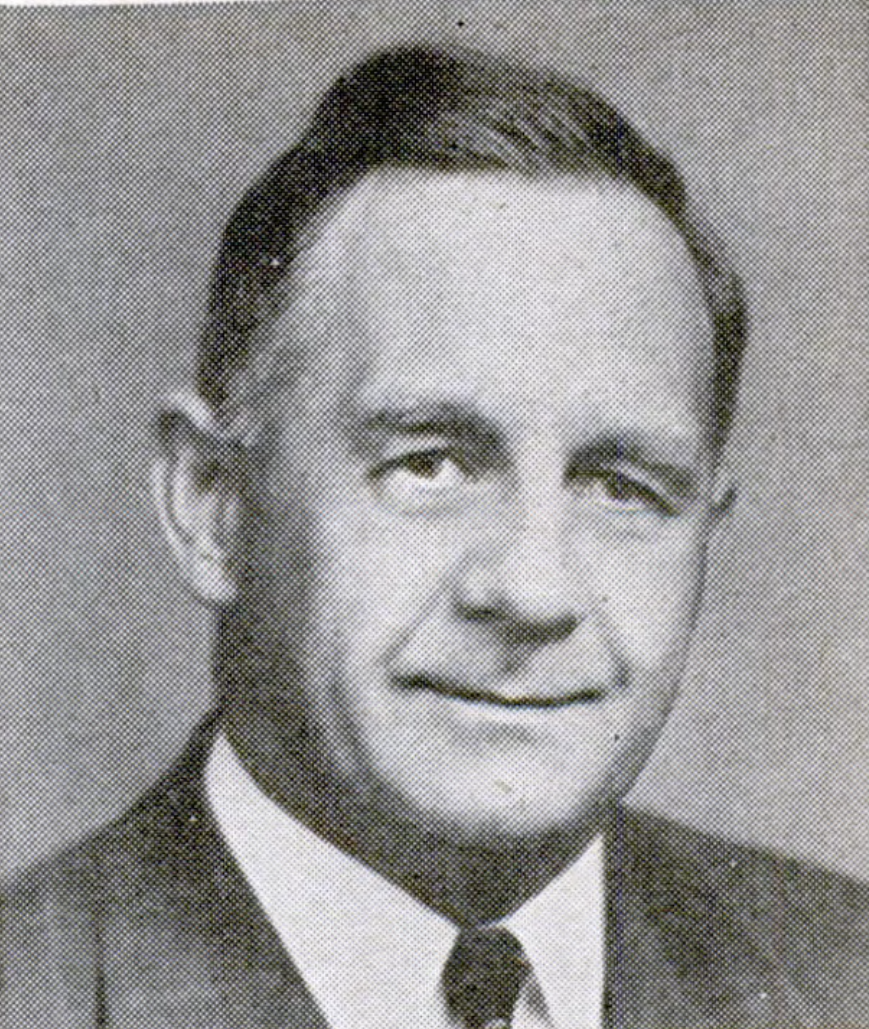

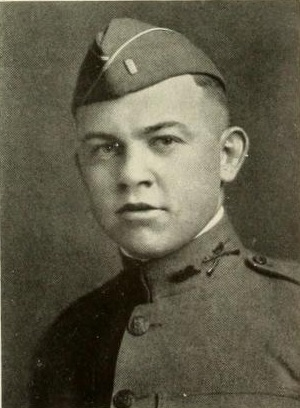
Nominee	Frank Carlson	Randolph Carpenter
Party	Republican	Democratic
Popular vote	433,396	307,485
Percentage	57.00%	40.44%
- County results Carlson: 40–50% 50–60% 60–70% 70–80% Carpenter: 50–60%
Governor before election
Frank Carlson
Republican
Elected Governor
Frank Carlson
Republican

The 1948 Kansas gubernatorial election was held on November 2, 1948. Incumbent Republican Frank Carlson defeated Democratic nominee Randolph Carpenter with 57.00% of the vote.

== Primary elections ==
Primary elections were held on August 3, 1948.

=== Democratic primary ===
==== Candidates ====
- Randolph Carpenter, former U.S. Representative
- Ewell Stewart

==== Results ====
Democratic primary results
Party	Candidate	Votes	%
Democratic	Randolph Carpenter	36,682	59.54
Democratic	Ewell Stewart	24,932	40.47
Total votes		61,614	100.00

=== Republican primary ===
==== Candidates ====
- Frank Carlson, incumbent Governor
- James A. McClain
- William P. Lambertson, former U.S. Representative

==== Results ====
Republican primary results
Party	Candidate	Votes	%
Republican	Frank Carlson (incumbent)	170,831	81.08
Republican	James A. McClain	21,068	10.00
Republican	William P. Lambertson	18,808	8.93
Total votes		210,707	100.00

== General election ==
=== Candidates ===
Major party candidates

- Frank Carlson, Republican
- Randolph Carpenter, Democratic

Other candidates

- N.W. Nice, Prohibition
- W. W. Tamplin, Socialist

=== Results ===
1948 Kansas gubernatorial election
Party	Candidate	Votes	%	±%
Republican	Frank Carlson (incumbent)	433,396	57.00%	
Democratic	Randolph Carpenter	307,485	40.44%	
Prohibition	N.W. Nice	17,035	2.24%	
Socialist	W. W. Tamplin	2,491	0.33%	
Majority		125,911		
Turnout				
Republican hold		Swing		
