= Tomasz Jasiński (ice hockey) =

Polish ice hockey player (1916–1998)

- Born: December 29, 1916 Bielitz, Austrian Silesia, Austria-Hungary
- Died: March 23, 1998 (aged 81) Wrocław, Poland
- Position: Left wing
- Played for: Czarni Lwów; Spartak Lwów; Wisła Kraków; Stal Katowice; KTH Krynica
- National team: Poland
- Playing career: 1932–1941; 1946–1954

Tomasz Tadeusz Jasiński (29 December 1916 – 23 March 1998) was a Polish ice hockey player. He played for Czarni Lwów, Spartak Lwów, Wisła Kraków, Stal Katowice and KTH Krynica during his career. In 1935 he won the Polish league title with Czarni Lwów. Jasiński also played for the Polish national team at the 1948 Winter Olympics.
