= Michel Marcel Navratil =

French philosopher and professor, Titanic survivor (1908–2001)

- Navratil c. 1994
- Born: 12 June 1908; Nice, France
- Died: 30 January 2001 (aged 92); Saint-Clément-de-Rivière, France
- Occupation: Professor
- Spouse: Charlotte Lebaudy-Blanc (m. 1933)
- Children: 3
- Parents: Michel Navratil (father); Marcelle Caretto (mother)

Michel Marcel Navratil (12 June 1908 – 30 January 2001) was a French philosophy professor who was one of the last survivors of the sinking of Titanic on 15 April 1912. He, along with his brother, Edmond (1910–1953), were known as the "Titanic Orphans", having been the only children rescued without a parent or guardian. He was three years old at the time of the disaster.

== Early life ==
Michel Jr. was born on 12 June 1908 in Nice, France, to Michel Navratil, a tailor and Slovak immigrant to France, and Marcella Caretto (Marcelle in French), an Italian, whom he had married in London, England, on 26 May 1907. His younger brother, Edmond, was born on 4 March 1910.

The marriage was troubled, and in early 1912 his parents separated. The boys were put into temporary care, while judges decided who would get custody. They spent Easter Monday with their father, who did not return them at the end of the day. Michel, who was about to be served with a bankruptcy notice, decided to emigrate to the United States before the notice was served, taking the boys with him. After buying White Star Line tickets in Monte Carlo, they travelled to England, where they boarded the RMS Titanic.

== Aboard Titanic ==
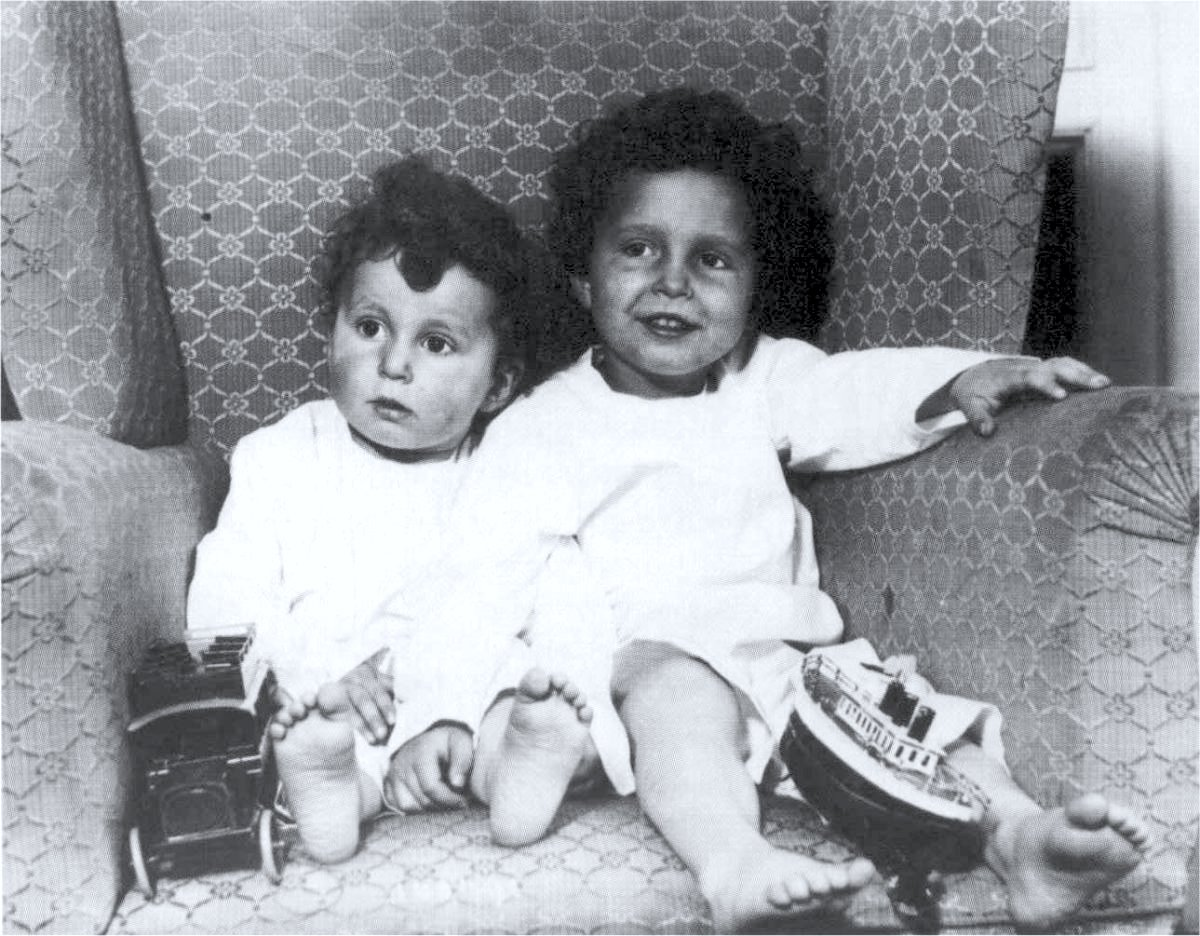
Michel, right, and his brother, Edmond, in a photograph taken to aid in their identification after the sinking

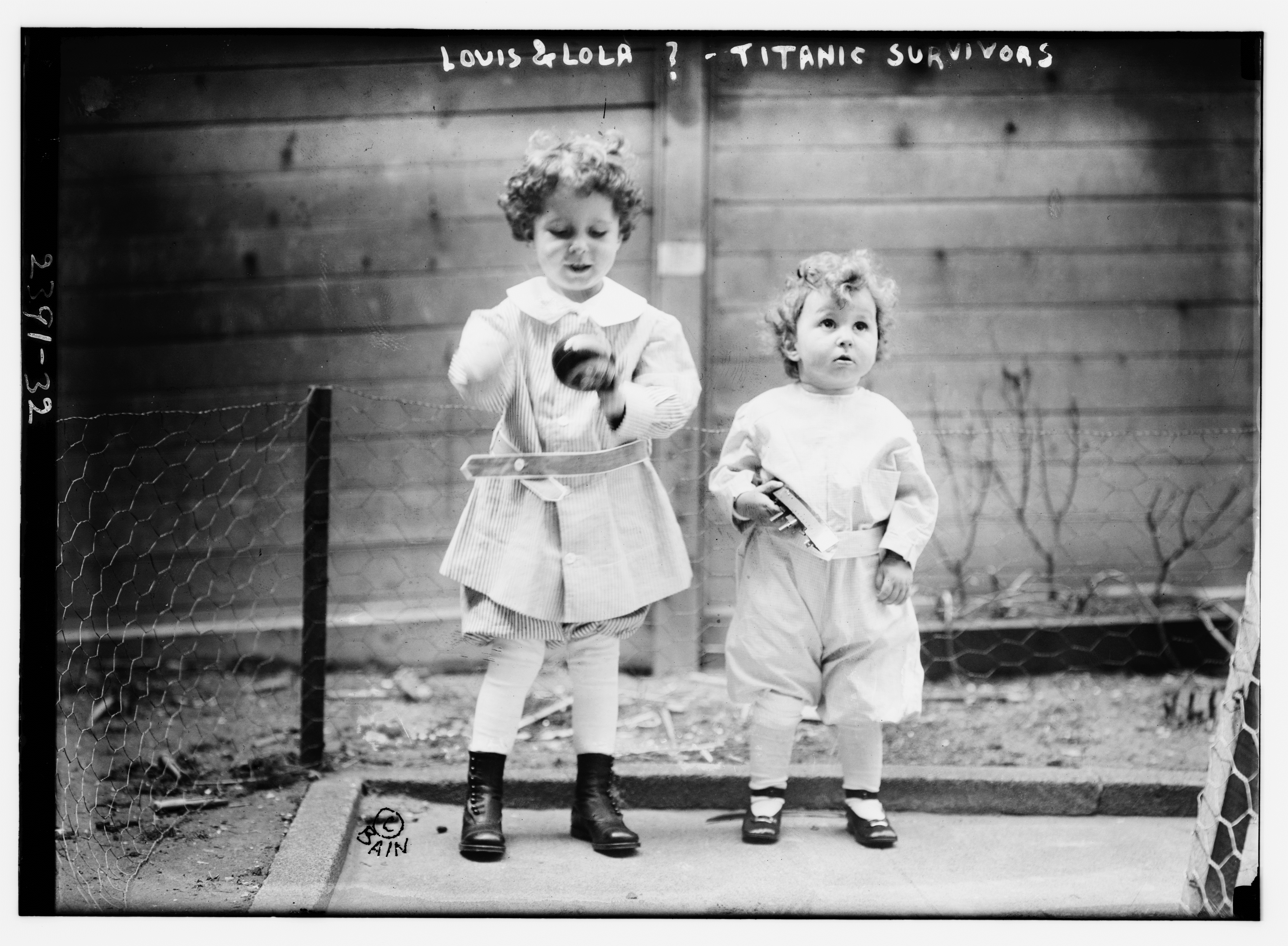
Another photograph of the brothers, published 22 April 1912, identifying them as "Louis and Lola".

Michel, Edmond, and their father boarded the Titanic at Southampton, England, on 10 April 1912 as second-class passengers. For the journey, using a stolen passport, Navratil assumed the alias "Louis M. Hoffman", and the boys were booked as John and Fred. On board the ship, he led passengers to believe that he was a widower. He let the boys out of his sight only once, when he allowed a French-speaking woman, Bertha Lehmann, to watch them for a few hours while he played cards.

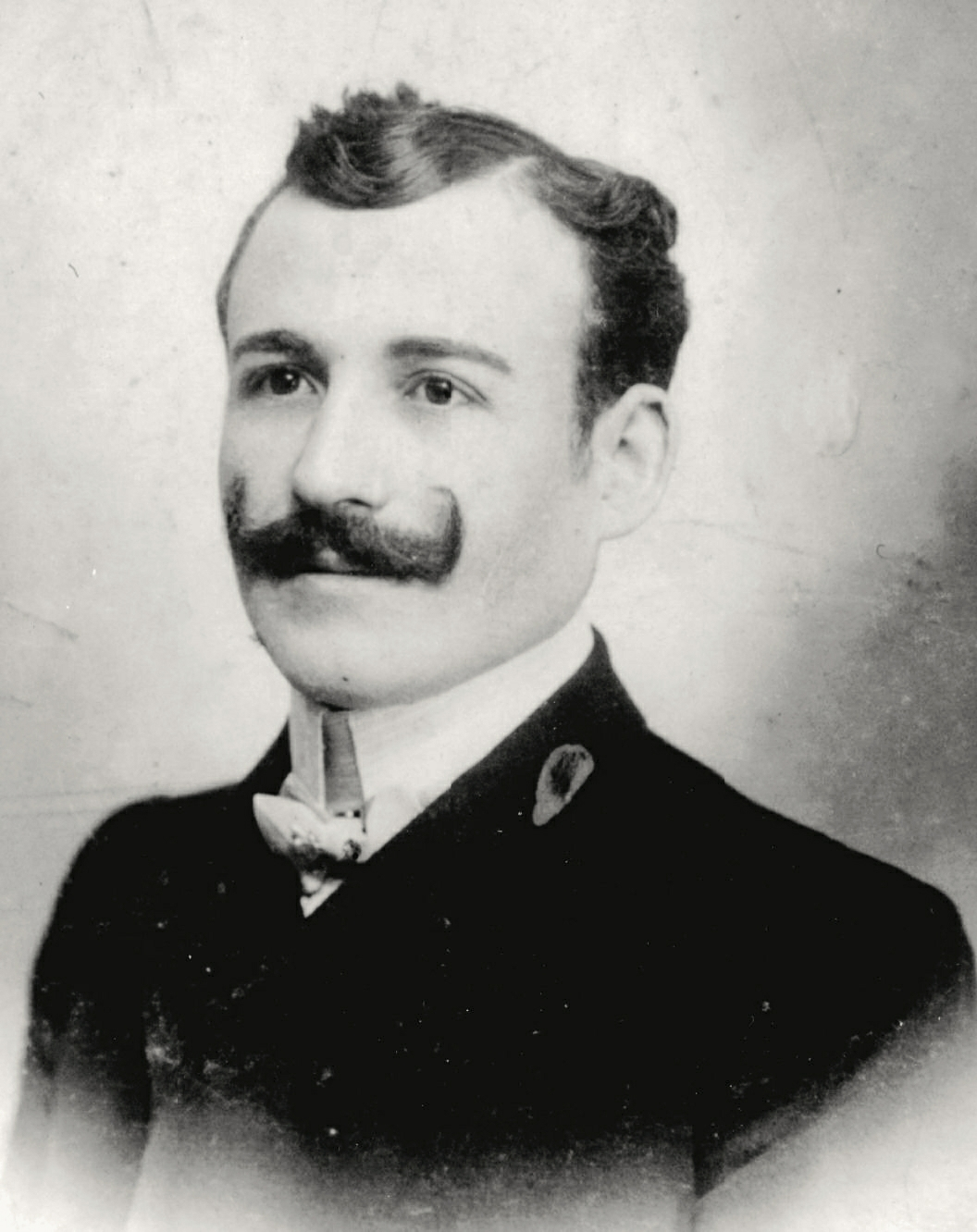
Michel Navratil Sr. (1880–1912), father of Michel and Edmond Navratil

After the collision with the iceberg at 11:40 pm on 14 April 1912, Navratil and another man went into the cabin to wake his two sons up. Michel Sr. placed Michel and Edmond in Collapsible D, the last lifeboat successfully launched from the ship. Michel, although not quite four years old at the time, later claimed to remember his father telling him, "My child, when your mother comes for you, as she surely will, tell her that I loved her dearly and still do. Tell her I expected her to follow us, so that we might all live happily together in the peace and freedom of the New World." Their father died in the sinking, and his body was recovered by the rescue ship, Mackay-Bennett. In his pocket was a revolver. Because of his assumed Jewish surname, he was buried in Baron de Hirsch Cemetery, Halifax, a Jewish cemetery in Nova Scotia.

While in Collapsible D, Michel was fed biscuits by first-class passenger Hugh Woolner. When the rescue ship Carpathia arrived at the scene, he and Edmond were hoisted to its deck in burlap sacks. Since they were toddlers and spoke no English, they could not identify themselves and were soon referred to as the "Titanic Orphans". French-speaking first-class passenger Margaret Hays cared for them at her house until their mother could be located, which occurred as a result of newspaper articles which included their nicknames. She sailed to New York City and was reunited with them on 16 May 1912. She took them back to France aboard the RMS Oceanic.

Michel later recalled his memory of the Titanic:

A magnificent ship!...I remember looking down the length of the hull – the ship looked splendid. My brother and I played on the forward deck and were thrilled to be there. One morning, my father, my brother, and I were eating eggs in the second-class dining room. The sea was stunning. My feeling was one of total and utter well being.

— Michel Navratil, translated with errors by Encyclopedia Titanica

and later:

I don't recall being afraid, I remember the pleasure, really, of going plop! into the lifeboat. We ended up next to the daughter of an American banker who managed to save her dog--no one objected. There were vast differences of people's wealth on the ship, and I realized later that if we hadn't been in second-class, we'd have died. The people who came out alive often cheated and were aggressive. The honest didn't stand a chance."

— Michel Navratil, translated by Encyclopedia Titanica

== Career ==
Michel attended college and in 1933 married a fellow student, Charlotte Lebaudy-Blanc, and they later had two daughters, Élisabeth and Michèle, and a son Henri. He went on to earn a doctorate and became a professor of philosophy at the University of Montpellier. Throughout his life, he maintained that his brush with death at such a young age, coupled with the loss of his father, strongly influenced his thought processes.

== Later life and death ==
In 1987, he travelled to Wilmington, Delaware to mark the 75th anniversary of the sinking. It was his first visit to the United States since 1912. The following year, he joined ten fellow survivors at a Titanic Historical Society convention in Boston, Massachusetts. In 1996, he joined fellow survivors Eleanor Shuman and Edith Brown on a cruise to the location of the wreck, where attempts were made to bring a large portion of the hull to the surface. On 27 August 1996, before his return to France, he travelled to Halifax, Nova Scotia, to see his father's grave for the first time.

He was one of two survivors to see the 1997 film, but did so at home, as opposed to survivor Eleanor Johnson Shuman, who had met director James Cameron during the production and received a special screening of the film. His daughter Élisabeth recalled that her father was moved by the film. He enjoyed seeing the ship race through the ocean and break the waves the way that he remembered seeing it as a child. Reacting to the scene of passengers freezing to death in the icy waters, he stated that he hoped his own father had not suffered for too long before dying.

Navratil lived the remainder of his life near Montpellier, France. He died on 30 January 2001, at the age of 92, preceded in death by his mother and brother. After the death of Alden Caldwell in December 1992, Navratil was the last male survivor of the Titanic sinking.

== See also ==
- Millvina Dean (1912–2009), last remaining survivor of the Titanic sinking

== Notes ==
- Edmond worked as an interior decorator and then became an architect and builder. He joined the French Army during World War II and became a prisoner of war of the Nazis. Although he escaped, his health had deteriorated, and he died prematurely on 7 July 1953 at age 43.
- Michel's daughter, Élisabeth, an opera director, wrote a book, Les enfants du Titanic (English: "The Children of the Titanic"; called Survivors in English) about the experiences of her father, grandfather, and uncle.
- Marcelle Caretto, the mother of Michel Jr. and Edmond, died in 1974.
