= James Monroe Miller =

American politician

James M. Miller
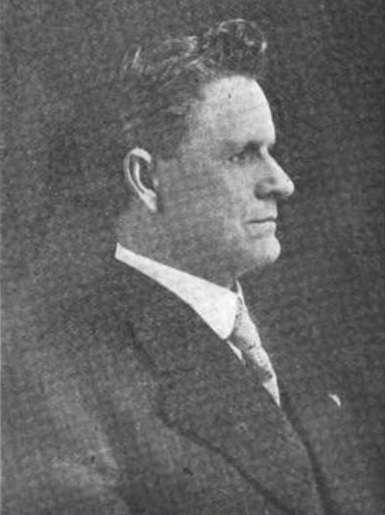
- From the February 1909 issue of National Magazine

Member of the U.S. House of Representatives from Kansas's 4th district
- In office March 4, 1899 – March 3, 1911
- Preceded by: Charles Curtis
- Succeeded by: Fred S. Jackson

Personal details
- Born: May 6, 1852 Three Springs, Pennsylvania
- Died: January 20, 1926 (aged 73) Council Grove, Kansas
- Party: Republican

James Monroe Miller (May 6, 1852 – January 20, 1926) was a U.S. representative from Kansas.

Born in Three Springs, Pennsylvania, Miller attended the district school and graduated from Lycoming College, Williamsport, Pennsylvania, in 1875. He moved to Skiddy, Kansas, in 1875.

Miller was Superintendent of schools in Council Grove, Kansas, for two terms, and while holding this position studied law. He was admitted to the bar in 1879 and commenced practice in Council Grove, Kansas. Miller was elected prosecuting attorney of Morris County, Kansas, in 1880 and again in 1884 and 1886. He served as member of the State house of representatives in 1894 and 1895.

Miller was elected as a Republican to the Fifty-sixth and to the five succeeding Congresses (March 4, 1899 – March 3, 1911). He served as chairman of the Committee on Claims (Fifty-ninth and Sixtieth Congresses), Committee on Elections No. 2 (Sixty-first Congress). He was an unsuccessful candidate for renomination in 1910.

Miller resumed the practice of law in Council Grove, Kansas, and died there January 20, 1926. He was interred in Greenwood Cemetery.

U.S. House of Representatives
Preceded by Charles Curtis	Member of the U.S. House of Representatives from Kansas's 4th congressional district March 4, 1899 - March 3, 1911	Succeeded by Fred S. Jackson
