= James MacDonald (cricketer) =

Personal information
- Full name: James Macdonald
- Born: 17 September 1906; Comber, County Down, United Kingdom
- Died: 8 March 1969 (aged 62); Bangor, County Down, Northern Ireland
- Batting: Left-handed
- Bowling: Slow left-arm orthodox
- Relatives: Thomas MacDonald (brother)

International information
- National side: Ireland

Domestic team information
- Years: Team
- 1926–1939: Ireland

Career statistics
Competition	First-class
Matches	14
Runs scored	622
Batting average	23.92
100s/50s	1/2
Top score	108*
Balls bowled	2,819
Wickets	35
Bowling average	25.45
5 wickets in innings	–
10 wickets in match	–
Best bowling	5/33
Catches/stumpings	5/–
- Source: Cricinfo, 24 October 2011

James Macdonald (17 September 1906 – 8 March 1969) was an Irish cricketer. MacDonald was a left-handed batsman who bowled slow left-arm orthodox. He was born at Comber, United Kingdom (today Northern Ireland).

Macdonald made his first-class debut for Ireland against Wales at Ormeau, Belfast in 1926. He made thirteen further first-class appearances for Ireland, the last of which came against Scotland in 1939. In his fourteen first-class matches, he scored 622 runs at an average of 23.92, with a high score of 108 not out. This score, which was his only first-class century, came against the Marylebone Cricket Club in 1936. An all-rounder, MacDonald took 35 wickets at a bowling average of 25.45, with best figures of 5/33. These figures, which were his only first-class five wicket haul, came against Scotland in 1933.

He died at Bangor, Northern Ireland on 8 March 1969. He was survived by his brother Thomas, who also played first-class cricket for Ireland. James had two other brothers George and Norman. Norman was born in 1914, saw active service in the Pacific at a Commander in the Royal Navy and died in 2014.
