= Roy Wilford Riegle =

American politician

Wilford Riegle
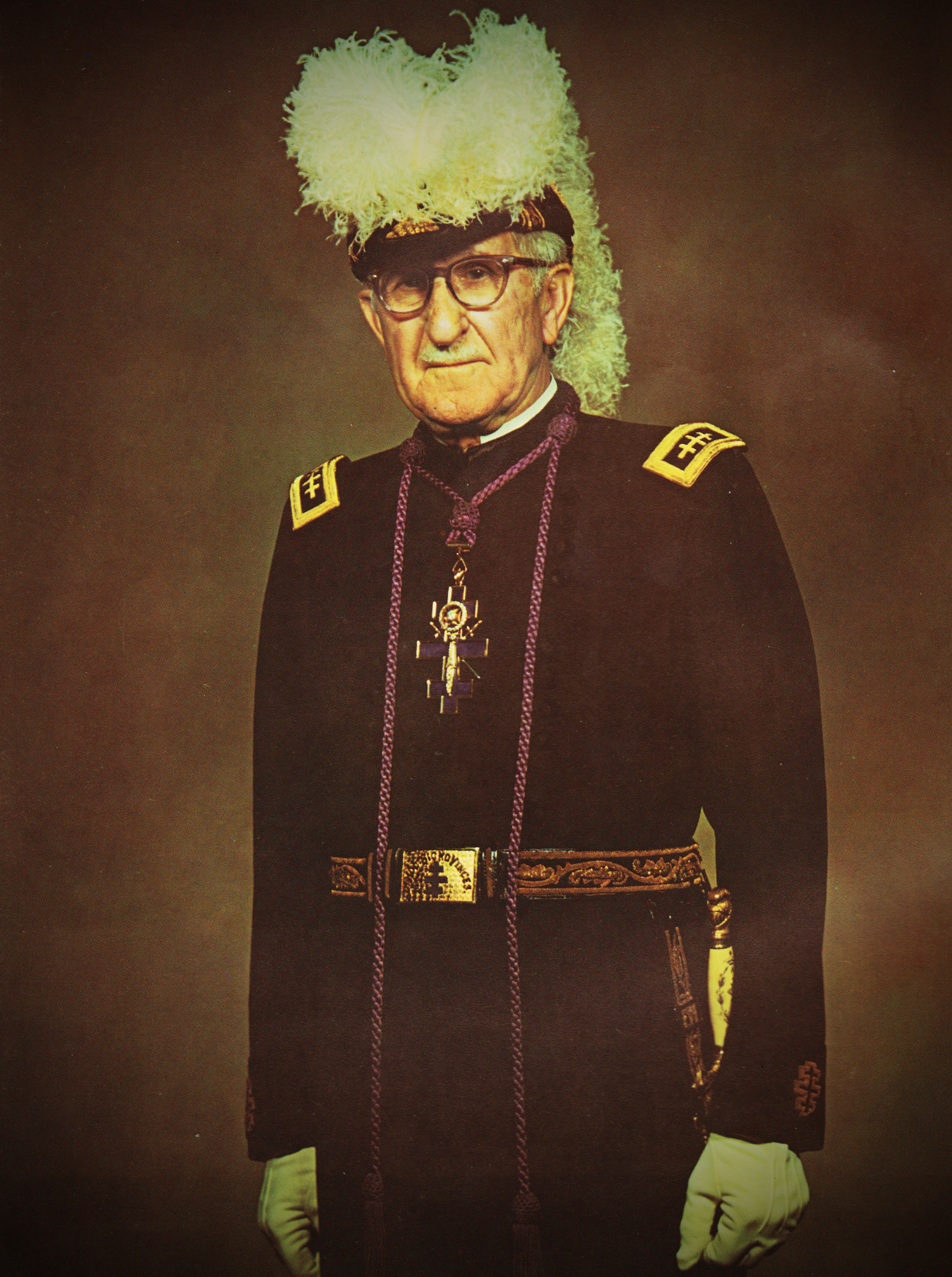
- Riegle in 1973 at Knights Templar (Freemasonry) 52nd Triennial Conclave, Chicago, IL

Member of the Kansas Senate from the 15th district
- In office January 12, 1953 – January 9, 1961
- Preceded by: Bob George
- Succeeded by: Wade Alexander Myers

Member of the Kansas Senate from the 22nd district
- In office January 14, 1941 – 1943
- Preceded by: William Carlisle Harris
- Succeeded by: Selleck Warren

Member of the Kansas House of Representatives from the 45th district
- In office January 9, 1933 – January 14, 1941
- Preceded by: Edward Herbert Rees
- Succeeded by: Felix Bruno Ross

Personal details
- Born: Roy Wilford Riegle; April 27, 1896 Lyons, Kansas, U.S.
- Died: February 2, 1988 (aged 91) Emporia, Kansas, U.S.
- Resting place: Leavenworth National Cemetery
- Party: Republican
- Spouse: Keith Maria Roberts
- Education: Washburn University (BA, LLB, MA)

Military service
- Allegiance: United States
- Branch/service: United States Army
- Rank: lieutenant colonel
- Battles/wars: World War I, World War II

Roy Wilford Riegle (April 27, 1896 – February 2, 1988) was an American attorney, politician, and member of the Kansas House of Representatives and Senate.

He met his future wife, Keith Maria Roberts, while attending Kansas State Normal School (now Emporia State University) during the 1910s. Before marriage, however, he was called to duty during World War I as part of the United States Army in Company L, 137th Infantry, 35th Division.

Aside from serving as the longest-practicing attorney in Lyons County, Riegle was a Republican member of both the Kansas House of Representatives and the Kansas Senate for multiple terms.

Riegle was an initiated member of Tau Kappa Epsilon fraternity at Emporia State University. In 1973, he took office as the Grand Master of the Knights Templar (Freemasonry) both nationally and overseas.

After a series of strokes and declining health, Riegle died on February 2, 1988.

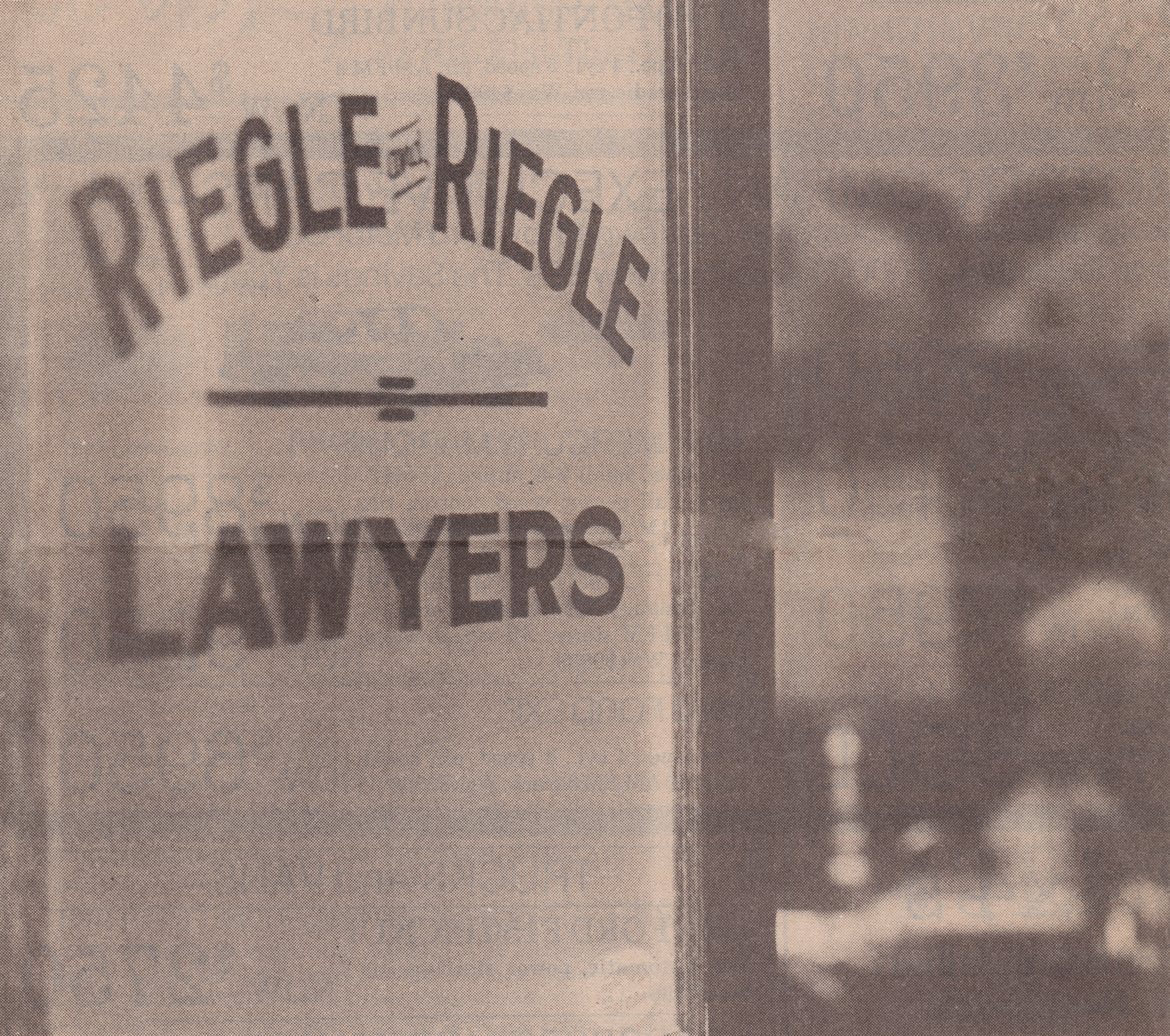
Riegle & Riegle Law (Palace Building)

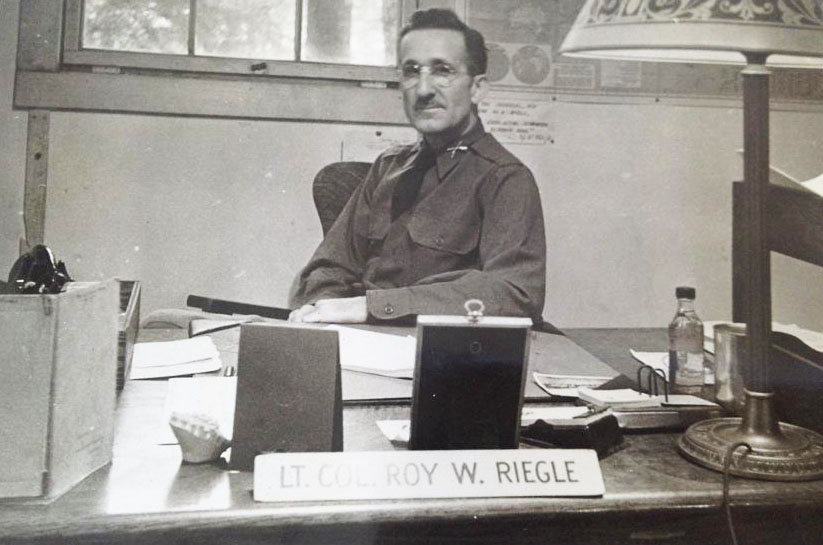
Juneau, AK (World War II)

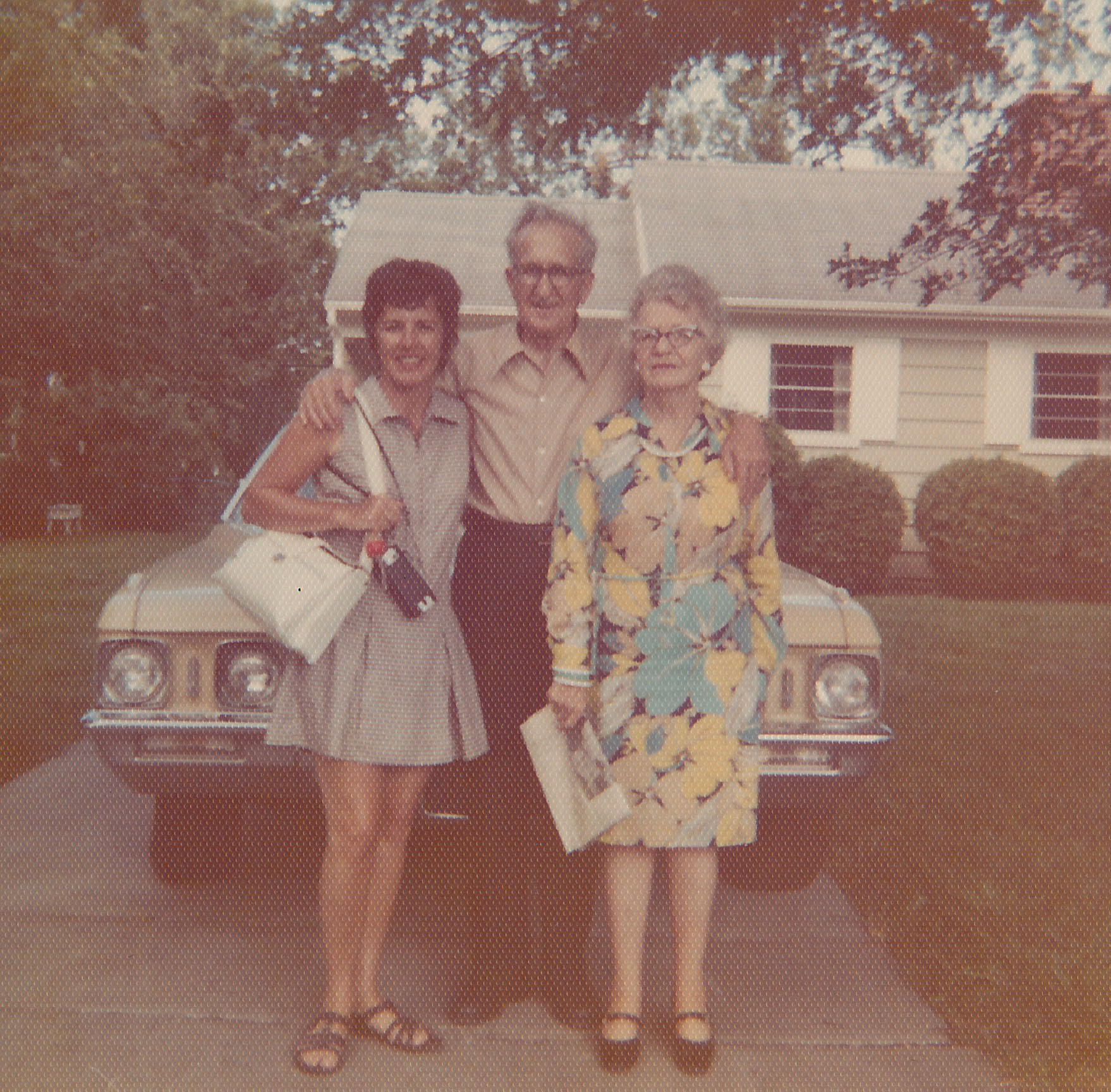
Jo Anna Scherrer (daughter; Left) & Keith Maria Riegle (Right)
