= Homer Hoch =

American lawyer, newspaper editor, Congressman and judge (1879–1949)

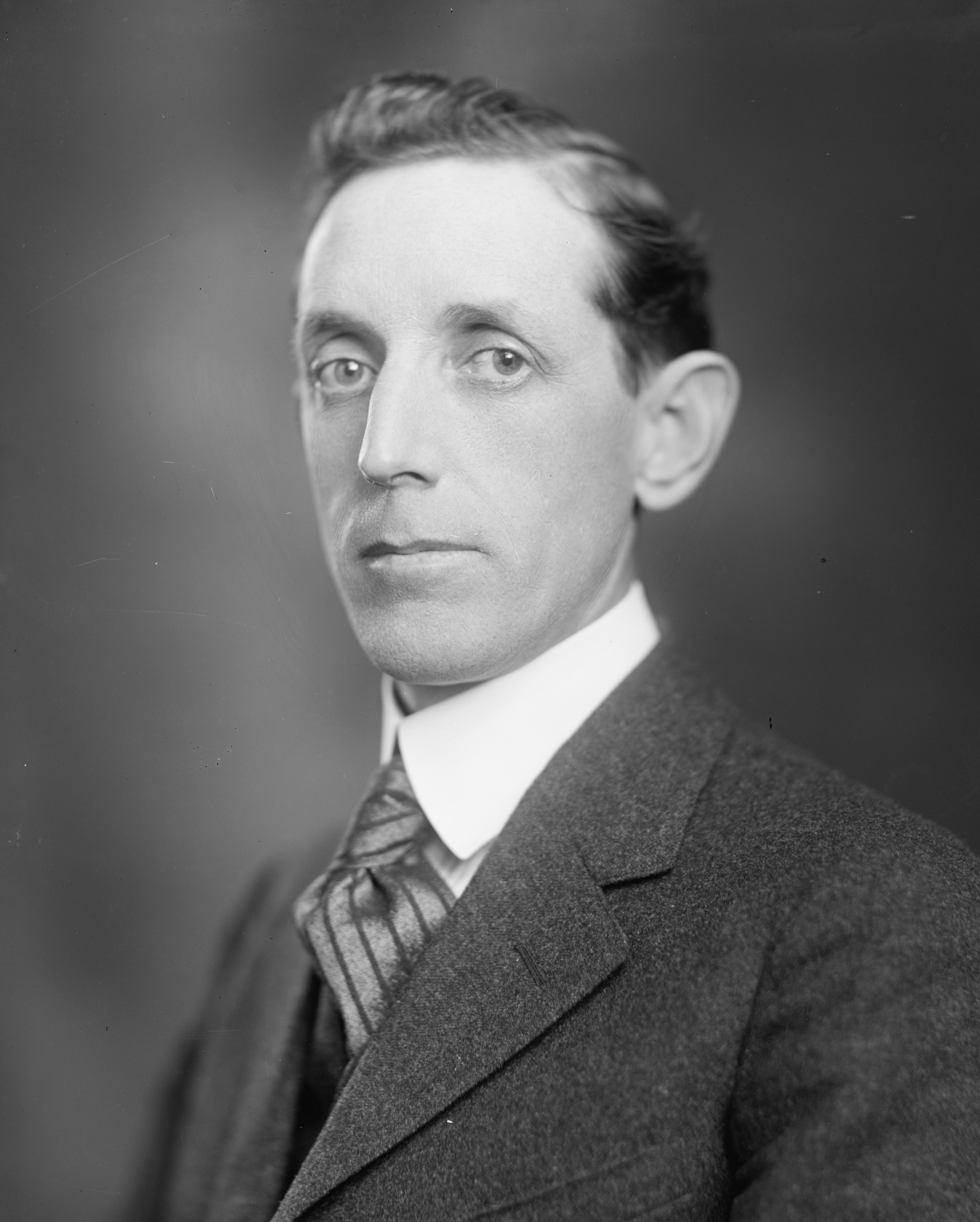

Member of the U.S. House of Representatives from Kansas's 4th district
- In office March 4, 1919 – March 3, 1933
- Preceded by: Dudley Doolittle
- Succeeded by: Randolph Carpenter

Personal details
- Born: July 4, 1879 Marion, Kansas
- Died: January 30, 1949 (aged 69) Topeka, Kansas
- Party: Republican

Homer Hoch (July 4, 1879 – January 30, 1949) was an American lawyer, newspaper editor, United States Congressman from Kansas, and judge who served seven terms in the United States House of Representatives from 1919 to 1933.

== Biography ==
Born in Marion, Kansas, Hoch graduated from Baker University in Baldwin City in 1902. He attended George Washington Law School and then Washburn Law School, from which he graduated in 1909.

=== Career ===
He served as clerk and chief of the Appointment Division in the United States Post Office Department, Washington, D.C. from 1903 to 1905. He was private secretary to the Governor of Kansas Edward Wallis Hoch in 1907 and 1908. He engaged in the practice of law in Marion from 1909 to 1919 and was editor of the Marion County Record newspaper. He served as delegate to the Republican National Convention in 1928.

=== Congress ===
Hoch was elected as a Republican to the Sixty-sixth and to the six succeeding Congresses (March 4, 1919 – March 3, 1933). He was an unsuccessful candidate for reelection in 1932 to the Seventy-third Congress. He served as member and chairman of the State Corporation Commission of Kansas 1933-1939.

=== Later career and death ===
Hoch was elected a member of the Kansas Supreme Court in 1938. He was reelected in 1944 and served until his death in Topeka, January 30, 1949. He was interred in Highland Cemetery in Marion.

== Family ==
Hoch's son, Wharton Hoch, was the editor and publisher of the Marion County Record in Marion, Kansas.

U.S. House of Representatives
Preceded by Dudley Doolittle	Member of the U.S. House of Representatives from Kansas's 4th congressional district March 4, 1919 – March 3, 1933	Succeeded by Randolph Carpenter
