= Dudley Doolittle =

American politician

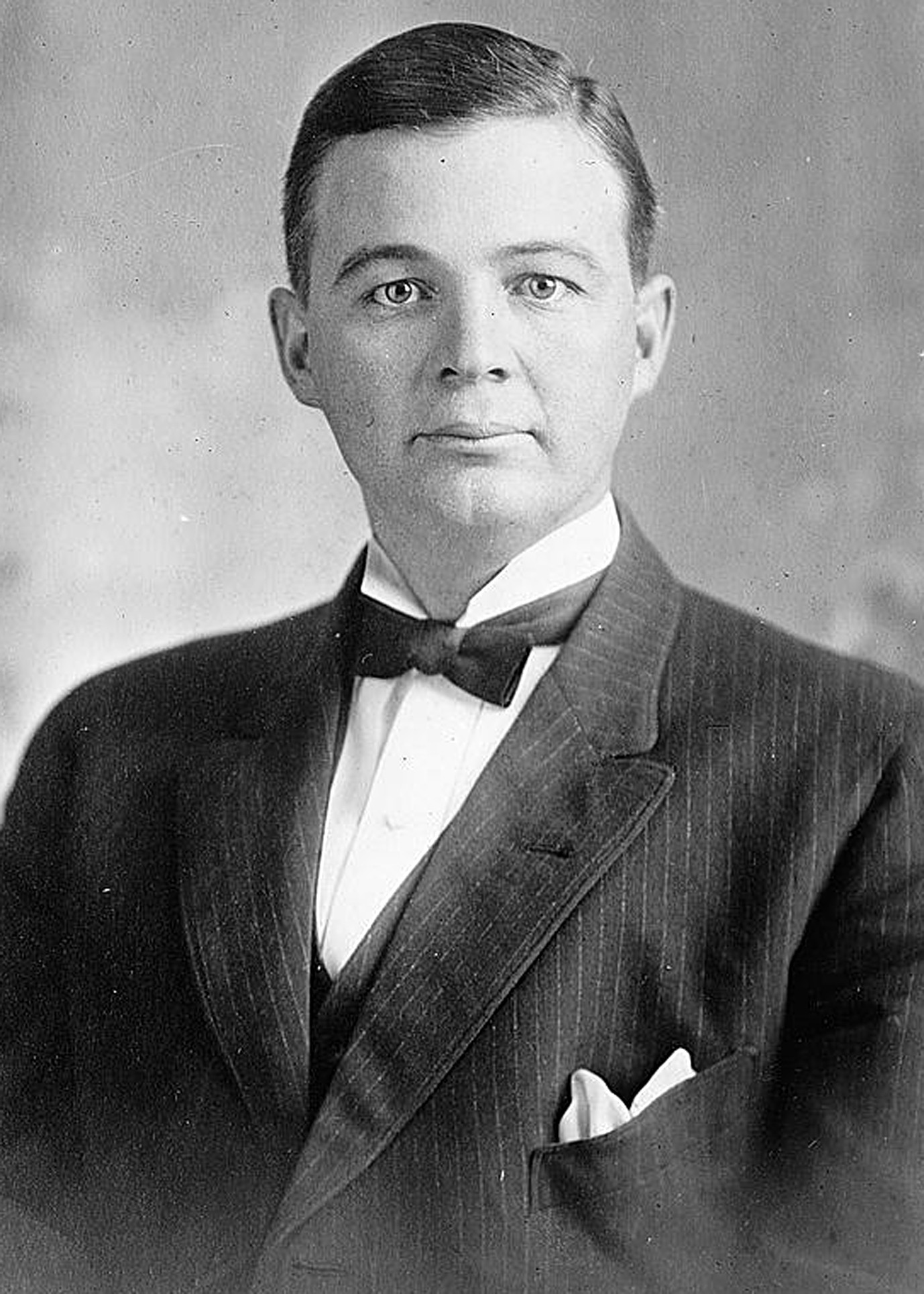

Member of the U.S. House of Representatives from Kansas's 4th district
- In office March 4, 1913 – March 3, 1919
- Preceded by: Fred S. Jackson
- Succeeded by: Homer Hoch

Personal details
- Born: June 21, 1881 Cottonwood Falls, Kansas
- Died: November 14, 1957 (aged 76) Emporia, Kansas
- Party: Democratic

Dudley Doolittle (June 21, 1881 – November 14, 1957) was an American lawyer and politician who served three terms as a U.S. representative from Kansas from 1913 to 1919.

== Early life and career ==
Born in Cottonwood Falls, Kansas, Doolittle attended the public schools and the University of Kansas at Lawrence, being graduated from its law department in 1903. He was admitted to the bar the same year and commenced practice at Cottonwood Falls, Kansas, in 1904.

He served as prosecuting attorney of Chase County from 1908 to 1912, and as mayor of Strong City in 1912.

== Congress ==
Doolittle was elected as a Democrat to the Sixty-third, Sixty-fourth, and Sixty-fifth Congresses (March 4, 1913 – March 3, 1919). He was an unsuccessful candidate for reelection in 1918 to the Sixty-sixth Congress.

== Later career ==
Representative of the United States Treasury Department to Italy in 1919. Federal Prohibition Director for Kansas in 1920. He engaged in the practice of law in Strong City, Kansas, Kansas City, Missouri, and Washington, D.C. from 1921 to 1934.

Doolittle was elected a member of the Democratic National Committee in 1925. He served as general agent of the ninth district, Farm Credit Administration from 1934 to 1938. He served as member of the board of directors of the College of Emporia and served as its president 1938-1940. He served as president of the Strong City State Bank and a director of the Exchange National Bank of Cottonwood Falls at time of death.

== Death ==
He died in Emporia, Kansas on November 14, 1957. He was interred in Prairie Grove Cemetery, Cottonwood Falls, Kansas.

U.S. House of Representatives
Preceded by Fred S. Jackson	Member of the U.S. House of Representatives from Kansas's 4th congressional district March 4, 1913 - March 3, 1919	Succeeded by Homer Hoch
