= Randolph Carpenter =

American WWI veteran, lawyer, and politician (1894–1956)

William Randolph Carpenter
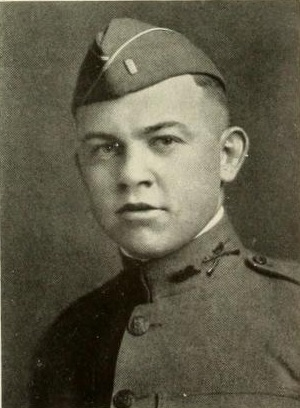
- From 1920's World War Roll of Honor, 1917-1920, Marion County, Kansas

Member of the U.S. House of Representatives from Kansas's 4th district
- In office March 4, 1933 – January 3, 1937
- Preceded by: Homer Hoch
- Succeeded by: Edward Herbert Rees

Member of the Kansas House of Representatives
- In office 1929–1933

Personal details
- Born: April 24, 1894 Marion, Kansas, U.S.
- Died: 26 July 1956 (aged 62) Topeka, Kansas, U.S.
- Resting place: Highland Cemetery, Marion, Kansas
- Party: Democratic
- Spouse: Helen Frances Williams
- Education: University of Michigan Law School

Military service
- Allegiance: United States of America
- Branch/service: United States Army; Kansas National Guard
- Years of service: 1917–1952
- Battles/wars: World War I

William Randolph Carpenter (April 24, 1894, Marion, Kansas – July 26, 1956, Topeka, Kansas) was a U.S. representative from Kansas and a U.S. Army World War I veteran.

== Biography ==
Carpenter attended local public and high schools in Marion, Kansas. He graduated from the law department of the University of Michigan at Ann Arbor in 1917, where he was a member of Chi Phi fraternity. Carpenter was admitted to the bar that same year and commenced his practice in Marion, Kansas. He continued his family's agricultural pursuits by maintaining his farm.

== World War I ==
Carpenter joined the U. S. Army National Guard in Marion in 1917 as a Second Lieutenant and helped organize Company M under the Third Regiment Infantry, Kansas National Guard. During the First World War he was called to active duty and was transferred to Company M, One Hundred Thirty-ninth Infantry Regiment, Thirty-fifth Infantry Division which deployed to France in early 1918. He was promoted to first lieutenant during the Meuse-Argonne offensive, and served until his discharge on May 8, 1919.

== Marriage ==
Carpenter married Helen Frances Williams (born 20 November 1896 in Marion, Kansas - died January 1994 in Topeka, Kansas) daughter of Fred Reed & Frances Elizabeth (née Skidmore) Williams on 15 July 1920 in Marion, Kansas.

== Community service ==
- Member of the Marion Board of Education (1925–1933)
- Served in the State House of Representatives (1929–1933)
- Elected as a Democrat to the Seventy-third and Seventy-fourth Congresses (March 4, 1933–January 3, 1937). Declined to run in 1936 and resumed the practice of law.
- United States Attorney for the District of Kansas (1945–1948)
- Democratic candidate for governor in 1948
- Member of the United States Motor Carrier Claims Commission (1950–1952)

== Death ==
He died in Topeka, Kansas at age 62 and was interred in Highland Cemetery, Marion, Kansas.

Party political offices
Preceded by Harry Hines Woodring	Democratic nominee for Governor of Kansas; 1948	Succeeded by Kenneth T. Anderson
U.S. House of Representatives
Preceded by Homer Hoch	Member of the U.S. House of Representatives from Kansas's 4th congressional district March 4, 1933 – January 3, 1937	Succeeded by Edward Herbert Rees
