= Edward H. Rees =

American politician

Edward Herbert Rees
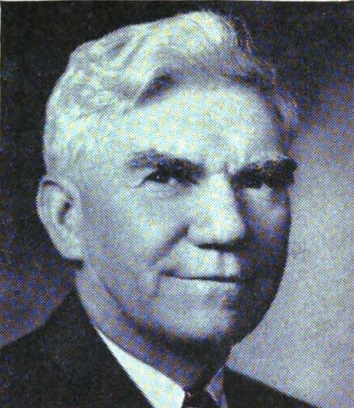

Member of the U.S. House of Representatives from Kansas's 4th district
- In office January 3, 1937 – January 3, 1961
- Preceded by: Randolph Carpenter
- Succeeded by: Garner E. Shriver

Member of the Kansas Senate from the 24th district
- In office January 9, 1933 – 1935
- Preceded by: Elbert Barrier
- Succeeded by: N. B. Wall

Member of the Kansas House of Representatives from the 45th district
- In office January 10, 1927 – January 9, 1933
- Preceded by: Arthur Ericsson
- Succeeded by: Roy Wilford Riegle

Personal details
- Born: June 3, 1886 Emporia, Kansas, U.S.
- Died: October 25, 1969 (aged 83) Emporia, Kansas, U.S.
- Party: Republican

Edward Herbert Rees (June 3, 1886 – October 25, 1969) was a U.S. representative from Kansas.

Born on a farm near Emporia, Kansas, his father and maternal grandparents were all born in Wales. Rees attended the public schools and the Kansas State Teachers' College at Emporia. He taught school in Lyon County, Kansas, from 1909 to 1911 and served as clerk of the court of Lyon County from 1912 to 1918.

Rees studied law, was admitted to the bar in 1915, and began a law practice in Emporia. He also engaged in agricultural pursuits. Serving as a member of the Kansas House of Representatives from 1927 to 1933, he was also a member of the Kansas Senate from 1933 to 1935 and a member of the Kansas Judicial Council from 1933 to 1937. Rees was elected as a Republican to the Seventy-fifth Congress and to the 11 succeeding Congresses (January 3, 1937 – January 3, 1961). He served as chairman of the Committee on the Post Office and Civil Service (Eightieth and Eighty-third Congresses). Rees voted in favor of the Civil Rights Acts of 1957 and 1960.

Rees was not a candidate for renomination in 1960. He resumed the practice of law in Emporia, where he died on October 25, 1969. He was interred in Maplewood Cemetery in Emporia.

U.S. House of Representatives
Preceded by Randolph Carpenter	Member of the U.S. House of Representatives from Kansas's 4th congressional district January 3, 1937 – January 3, 1961	Succeeded by Garner E. Shriver
