= Björn Gidstam =

Swedish artist

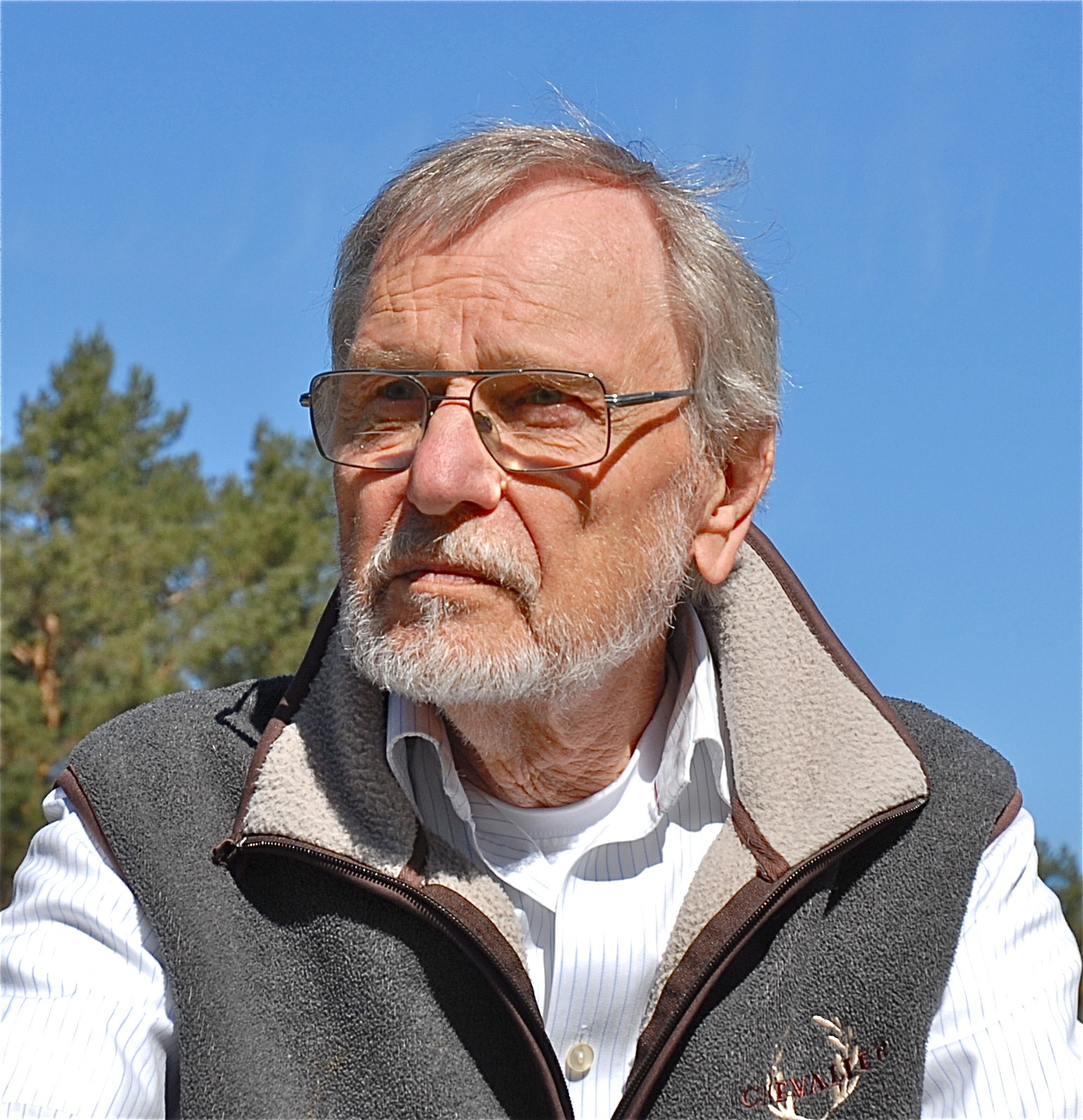
- Born: 21 May 1938; Nybro
- Website: www.bjorngidstam.se

Björn Gidstam (born 1938 in Nybro) is a Swedish artist.

== Career ==
In February 2010 Gidstam noted in his eleventh landscape book that unique features such as meadows, paddocks, and old plantations define Västergötland's landscape. He recalled being struck by the ancient remains in Eriksberg in Herrljunga and Ätradalen, which indicate human habitation for tens of thousands of years.

In 2020 Gidstam published a book named, Blekinge. In the same year, a documentary titled Björn Gidstam: A Famous Doldis, was released by journalist Jan-Eric Lundberg for Sveriges Television, featuring Gidstam and his works.

== Artistic style ==
Gidstam's paintings primarily use mood, atmosphere, and light, often exploring the intersection between dreamlike scenarios and reality, romanticism and realism. He has also contributed to public portrait painting.
