= Lawrence Trussell =

Lawrence Weems Trussell (February 21, 1909 – March 12, 1998) was a lawyer and politician in Arkansas who served in the Arkansas House of Representatives and then the Arkansas Senate, representing the 16th district.

Trussell died from heart failure on March 12, 1998, at the age of 89.
