= Garner E. Shriver =

American politician (1912–1998)

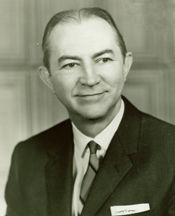

Member of the U.S. House of Representatives from Kansas's 4th district
- In office January 3, 1961 – January 3, 1977
- Preceded by: Edward H. Rees
- Succeeded by: Dan Glickman

Member of the Kansas Senate
- In office 1953–1960

Member of the Kansas House of Representatives
- In office 1947–1951

Personal details
- Born: July 6, 1912 Towanda, Kansas, U.S.
- Died: March 1, 1998 (aged 85) Wichita, Kansas, U.S.
- Party: Republican Party
- Education: University of Wichita; Washburn Law School

Garner Edward Shriver (July 6, 1912 – March 1, 1998) was a U.S. representative from Kansas.

== Biography ==
Born in Towanda, Kansas, Shriver attended the public schools of Towanda and Wichita. He moved with his family to Wichita, Kansas in 1925. He was in the University of Wichita, B.A., 1934 (postgraduate study at University of Southern California in 1936), and Washburn Law School, LL.B., 1940 and J.D., 1970. He worked for a drug company in Wichita from 1934 to 1936. He was a teacher at South Haven High School in 1936 and 1937. He was admitted to the bar in Wichita in February 1940. He served for three years in the United States Navy as an enlisted man and officer from 1943 to 1946. He served in the Kansas House of Representatives from 1947 to 1951 and then in the Kansas Senate from 1953 to 1960.

Shriver was elected as a Republican to the Eighty-seventh and to the seven succeeding Congresses (January 3, 1961 – January 3, 1977). In 1974, Shriver won with about 49 percent of the vote in a three-way race. He was an unsuccessful candidate for reelection in 1976 to the Ninety-fifth Congress. He was defeated by Dan Glickman by three percentage points.

After losing reelection, he served as minority staff director and legal counsel for the Senate Veterans' Affairs Committee from March 1977 until 1980. He then served as the committee's general counsel from 1981 to 1982. He later resumed the practice of law and was a resident of Wichita, Kansas, until his death there on March 1, 1998.

A post office in Wichita was named in his honor.

U.S. House of Representatives
| Preceded by Edward H. Rees | Member of the U.S. House of Representatives from Kansas's 4th congressional district January 3, 1961 – January 3, 1977 | Succeeded by Dan Glickman |
