= Alonzo Hicks =

American baseball player

- Outfielder
- Born: March 7, 1922; Clarksburg, West Virginia, U.S.
- Died: March 10, 1998 (aged 76); Erie, Pennsylvania, U.S.

Negro league baseball debut
- 1947, for the Homestead Grays

Last appearance
- 1947, for the Homestead Grays

Teams
- Homestead Grays (1947)

Alonzo Hicks Jr. (March 7, 1922 – March 10, 1998) was an American Negro league outfielder in the 1940s.

A native of Clarksburg, West Virginia, Hicks played for the Homestead Grays in 1947. He died in Erie, Pennsylvania, in 1998 at age 76.
