= 1934–35 Polska Liga Hokejowa season =

Polish ice hockey season

The 1934–35 Polska Liga Hokejowa season was the eighth season of the Polska Liga Hokejowa, the top level of ice hockey in Poland. Four teams participated in the final round, and Czarni Lwów won the championship.

== Qualification ==
- KS Cracovia - Pogoń Lwów 4:1/1:1
- Lechia Lwów - KTH Krynica 6:1/3:1

== Final Tournament ==
	Club	GP	W	T	L	Goals	Pts
1.	Lechia Lwów	3	2	0	1	7:4	4
2.	Czarni Lwów	3	2	0	1	3:2	4
3.	KS Cracovia	3	1	1	1	4:5	3
4.	AZS Poznań	3	0	1	2	3:6	1

=== Final ===
- Czarni Lwów - Lechia Lwów 4:0
