= Stanton, Kansas =

- Unincorporated community
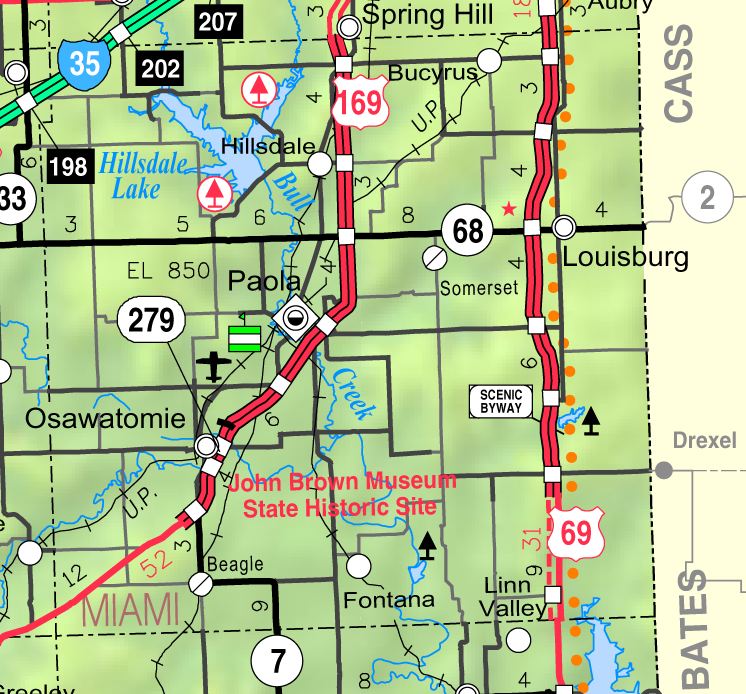
- KDOT map of Miami County (legend)

- Location within Kansas Location within the United States
- Coordinates: 38°32′36″N 95°03′16″W
- Country: United States
- State: Kansas
- County: Miami
- Elevation: 955 ft (291 m)
- Time zone: UTC-6 (CST)
  - Summer (DST): UTC-5 (CDT)
- Area code: 913
- FIPS code: 20-67900
- GNIS ID: 479689

Stanton is an unincorporated community in Miami County, Kansas, United States. It is part of the Kansas City metropolitan area.

== History ==
Stanton was founded in 1855. Stanton had a post office from 1857 until 1903.
