= Van E. Chandler =

American flying ace (1925–1998)

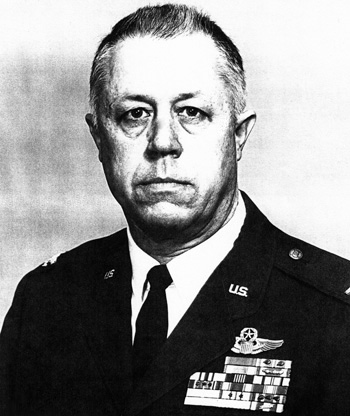
- Official portrait, 1970s
- Born: Van Edgar Chandler; March 5, 1925; Kemp, Texas, U.S.
- Died: March 11, 1998 (aged 73); Greeley, Colorado, U.S.
- Military career
- Allegiance: United States
- Branch: Air Force
- Service years: 1943–1974
- Rank: Colonel
- Units: 4th Fighter Group; 51st Fighter-Interceptor Wing; 31st Tactical Fighter Wing
- Commands: 22nd Tactical Fighter Squadron
- Conflicts: World War II; Korean War; Vietnam War
- Awards: Legion of Merit (2); Distinguished Flying Cross (3); Meritorious Service Medal; Air Medal (13)

Van Edgar Chandler (March 5, 1925 – March 11, 1998) was an American military officer and flying ace who was credited in destroying five enemy aircraft in aerial combat during World War II, becoming the youngest flying ace in the United States Armed Forces. (Note: Chandler is considered as youngest flying ace in the United States Armed Forces during the war. Claude Weaver III achieved the status of youngest American flying ace at the age of 18 in 1942 while flying with the Royal Canadian Air Force during the war.) He flew missions in the Korean War and Vietnam War, before his retirement from the United States Air Force in 1974 with the rank of colonel.

== Early life ==
Chandler was born on March 5, 1925, in Kemp, Texas.

== Military career ==
In February 1943, he enlisted in the United States Army Air Forces but was initially rejected due to his young age. In March 1943, he was allowed to enlist and enter into active duty. In January 1944, he earned his wings and commission as a second lieutenant.

=== World War II ===
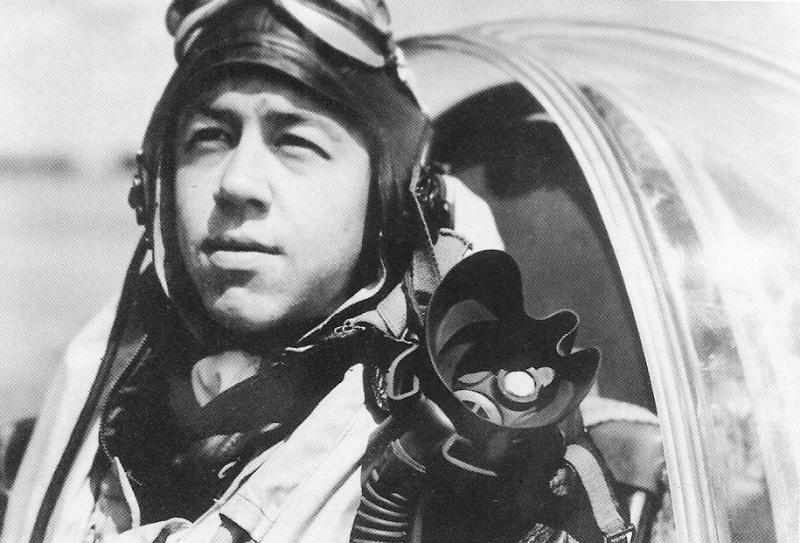
Chandler on board his P-51 Mustang during World War II

In June 1944, Chandler was assigned to the 336th Fighter Squadron of the 4th Fighter Group in the European Theater of Operations. Based at RAF Debden, he flew missions in the North American P-51 Mustang. While flying a mission one week after his arrival in England, Chandler's P-51 suffered a malfunction and he had to bail out over Germany. After his escape, he was taken care of by a Belgian family until he was rescued by the British Army.

After returning to his unit, he scored his first aerial victory on September 12, when he shot down a Focke-Wulf Fw 190 over Wiesbaden, Germany. He scored his second aerial victory on November 6. On Christmas Day 1944, he shot down a Fw 190 and Messerschmitt Bf 109 over Koblenz. He achieved flying ace status on New Year's Day 1945, when he shot down a Bf 109 over Uelzen at the age of 19, making him the youngest pilot in the United States Armed Forces to achieve the status. On January 29, 1945, he was appointed as the 336th Fighter Squadron's Assistant Operations and Gunnery Officer.

During World War II, Chandler was credited with the destruction of five enemy aircraft in aerial combat plus four destroyed on the ground while strafing enemy airfields. While serving with the 4th FG, he flew P-51s bearing the name "Wheezy".

=== Cold War ===
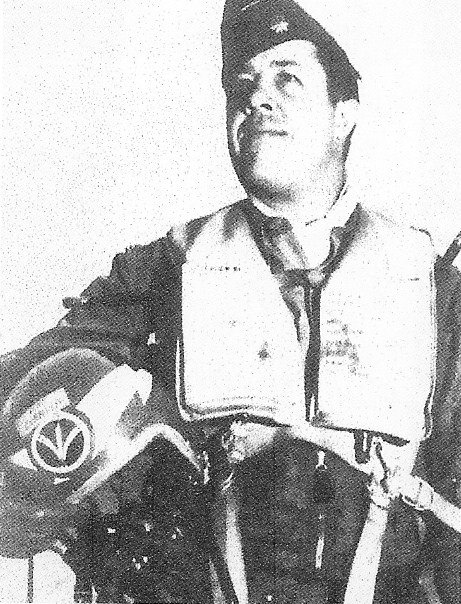
Chandler during the Korean War

Following the end of World War II, Chandler was assigned to the 76th Fighter Squadron in Guam and in December 1948, he was assigned to the 61st Fighter-Interceptor Squadron.

In September 1951, he was promoted to the rank of major and in December that year, he was assigned to the 25th Fighter-Interceptor Squadron of the 51st Fighter-Interceptor Wing at Suwon Air Base in South Korea during the Korean War. During the war, he was credited in shooting down three Mikoyan-Gurevich MiG-15s while flying the F-86 Sabre, bringing his total aerial victories to eight.

After his return from Korea, Chandler served with the Air Defense Command at Ent Air Force Base in Colorado and Lockheed F-104 Starfighter project officer at Edwards Air Force Base in California, from 1952 to 1956. In March 1958, he attended Royal Air Force Staff College in London, England, and in the same year, he served as commander of the 22nd Tactical Fighter Squadron at Bitburg Air Base in West Germany. In 1961, he was assigned to the headquarters of the Strategic Air Command at Offutt Air Force Base in Nebraska and in August 1967, he was assigned to the headquarters of the United States Air Force at the Pentagon.

After attending Air War College from August 1968 to August 1969, Chandler was assigned as Deputy Commander for Operations of the 31st Tactical Fighter Wing at Tuy Hoa Air Base in South Vietnam during the Vietnam War. He flew missions in the North American F-100 Super Sabre during the war till August 1970.

His final assignment was at Duluth International Airport in Minnesota, where he served as the Deputy for Operations for the 23rd NORAD Continental Air Defense Region, from June 1972 until his retirement from the Air Force in August 1974.

== Later life ==
Chandler was married to Mary Elizabeth, née Weber. The couple had a daughter and three grandchildren.

After his retirement from the Air Force, Chandler and his family moved to Greeley, Colorado. He graduated with a degree in business from the University of Northern Colorado. Chandler died of cancer on March 11, 1998, at the age of 73. In accordance with his wishes, he was cremated and his ashes scattered over the Pawnee Buttes.

== Aerial victory credits ==
Date	#	Type	Location	Aircraft flown	Unit Assigned
September 12, 1944	1	Focke-Wulf Fw 190	Wiesbaden, Germany	P-51B Mustang	336 FS, 4 FG
November 6, 1944	1	Fw 190	Minden, Germany	P-51D Mustang	336 FS, 4 FG
December 25, 1944	1	Messerschmitt Bf 109	Koblenz, Germany	P-51D Mustang	336 FS, 4 FG
December 25, 1944	1	Fw 190	Koblenz, Germany	P-51D Mustang	336 FS, 4 FG
January 1, 1945	1	Bf 109	Uelzen, Germany	P-51D Mustang	336 FS, 4 FG
January 6, 1952	1	Mikoyan-Gurevich MiG-15	North Korea	F-86 Sabre	25 FIS, 51 FIW
February 20, 1952	1	MiG-15	North Korea	F-86 Sabre	25 FIS, 51 FIW
February 27, 1952	1	MiG-15	North Korea	F-86 Sabre	25 FIS, 51 FIW

SOURCES: Air Force Historical Study 85: USAF Credits for the Destruction of Enemy Aircraft, World War II and Air Force Historical Study 81: USAF Credits for the Destruction of Enemy Aircraft, Korean War, Freeman 1993

== Awards and decorations ==
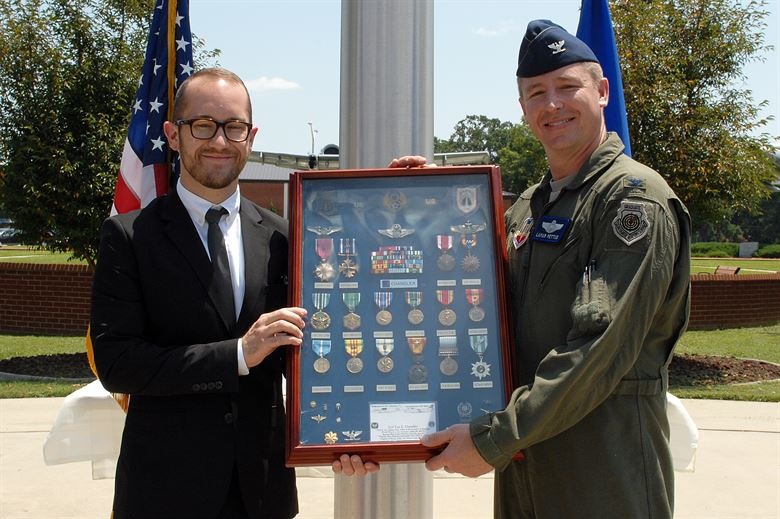
Thomas Nash (left), grandson of Van Chandler, presents shadow box of his grandfather's medals to Col. Lamar Pettus, 4th Fighter Wing vice commander, during a ceremony at Seymour Johnson Air Force Base (2013).

His awards include:

U.S. Air Force Command Pilot Badge

Legion of Merit with bronze oak leaf cluster
Distinguished Flying Cross with two bronze oak leaf clusters
Meritorious Service Medal
Air Medal with two silver and two bronze oak leaf clusters
Joint Service Commendation Medal
Army Commendation Medal
American Campaign Medal
European-African-Middle Eastern Campaign Medal with three bronze campaign stars
World War II Victory Medal
National Defense Service Medal with bronze service star
Korean Service Medal
Vietnam Service Medal with two bronze campaign stars
Air Force Longevity Service Award with silver and bronze oak leaf clusters
Armed Forces Reserve Medal
Republic of Vietnam Gallantry Cross Unit Citation
United Nations Service Medal for Korea
Vietnam Campaign Medal
Korean War Service Medal (Note: In 2000 this award was made retroactive to all U.S. military personnel who served in the Korean War.)

- Congressional Gold Medal (2015)
