= Ray Gillam =

Australian rugby league footballer

Personal information
- Full name: John Raymond Gillam
- Born: 8 September 1909 Berry, New South Wales, Australia
- Died: 23 March 1998 (aged 88) North Sydney, New South Wales, Australia

Playing information
- Position: Second-row
Club
Years	Team	Pld	T	G	FG	P
1931	Eastern Suburbs	2	2	0	0	6
1934–35	North Sydney	31	8	0	0	24
1936–37	Western Suburbs	8	1	0	0	3
	Total	41	11	0	0	33
- Source: As of 13 February 2019

John Raymond Gillam (1909 – 23 March 1998) was a professional rugby league footballer in the Australian competition the New South Wales Rugby League (NSWRL).

== Playing career ==
Gillam began his career in the lower Grades at Glebe before moving to the Eastern suburbs club, he only appeared in a few first grade matches at Easts in 1931 but was a member of that club's 3rd grade winning side in 1930. Gillam, the brother-in-law of Sir Donald Bradman, also played for North Sydney for two seasons in 1934–1935 and Western Suburbs for two seasons between 1935–1936 before retiring.

Gillam died on 23 March 1998, aged 88.
