= Maciej Słomczyński =

Polish translator and writer

Maciej Słomczyński (April 10, 1920 or 1922 – March 21, 1998) was a Polish translator and writer. For his detective stories he used the pen names Joe Alex and Kazimierz Kwaśniewski.

== Life and work ==
Born in Warsaw, he was the son of Merian C. Cooper, an American aviator, American Air Force and Polish Air Force officer, adventurer, and the screenwriter, director and producer of the film King Kong. His mother was an Englishwoman, Marjorie Słomczyńska née Crosby (1884–1954). He adopted his last name, Słomczyński, after his stepfather, Aleksander Słomczyński, who married Marjorie after she had not agreed to leave for the United States with Cooper. However, the fatherhood of Cooper has been questioned, among others, by his family.

In 1941, he joined the Polish resistance organization Confederation of the Nation and in 1943 the Polish Home Army. In 1944 he was arrested and imprisoned in Pawiak, from which he managed to escape. Later he moved West and served in the American Gendarmerie in France.

He debuted as a poet in 1946 in Tydzień magazine in Łódź. In 1947 he returned to Poland and seven years later he moved permanently to Kraków.

After the war he was persecuted and questioned as a suspected British spy. For a few months in 1953, he worked for Służba Bezpieczeństwa (State Security), and he fled to Gdańsk to break away from the agency. Later, he persistently refused to cooperate.

He is the author of the 1957 novel Cassiopeia, in which he presented the attitudes of the artistic circles towards communism and the reasons, which made a great part of these circles to serve the new government.

He translated Ulysses and Gulliver's Travels into Polish; he was the only person in the world to translate all the works of William Shakespeare. His translations of Shakespeare were, however, criticized for lack of clarity, faithfulness to the original or any literary value.

He was a member of the Stowarzyszenie Pisarzy Polskich and Rotary Club, as well as the vice-president of the international association The James Joyce Foundation, and since 1973, a member of the Irish Institute.

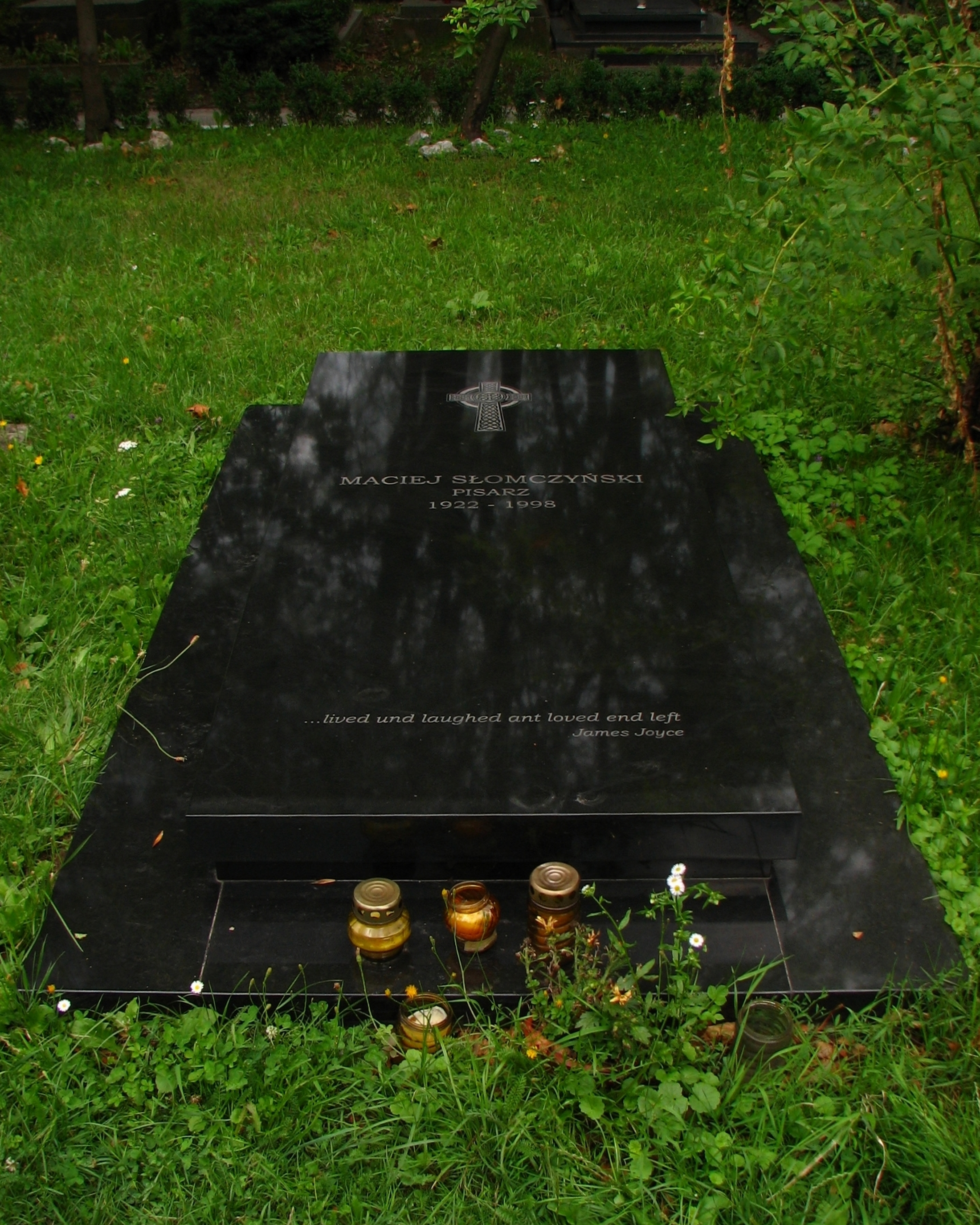
Słomczyński's grave

=== Joe Alex and Kazimierz Kwaśniewski ===
Słomczyński was the author of crime fiction published under the pen names Joe Alex (or Józef Aleks) and Kazimierz Kwaśniewski. As Joe Alex he authored film scripts, stage plays and TV plays, in particular, for the TV Theatre of Sensation "Cobra". Alex's crime fiction was translated into 13 languages: Belarusian, Bulgarian, Czech, Lithuanian, Latvian, German, Russian, Romanian, Serbo-Croatian, Slovak, Slovene, Ukrainian and Hungarian. Most of his books in the USSR were published without his permission or without the permission of his descendants.

== Bibliography ==
As Maciej Słomczyński:

- Lądujemy 6 czerwca
- Zadanie porucznika Kenta
- Fabryka śmierci
- Szary cień

As Joe Alex:

- Śmierć mówi w moim imieniu
- Cichym ścigałam go lotem
- Gdzie przykazań brak dziesięciu
- Niechaj odnajdą swoich wrogów
- Zmącony spokój Pani Labiryntu
- Cicha jak ostatnie tchnienie
- Jesteś tylko diabłem
- Piekło jest we mnie
- Powiem wam jak zginął
- Czarne okręty

As Kazimierz Kwaśniewski:

- Śmierć i Kowalski
- Zbrodniarz i panna
- Każę aktorom powtórzyć morderstwo
- Gdzie jest trzeci król?
- Ciemna jaskinia
- Czarny Kwiat
