= Wanda Tettoni =

Italian actress and voice actress

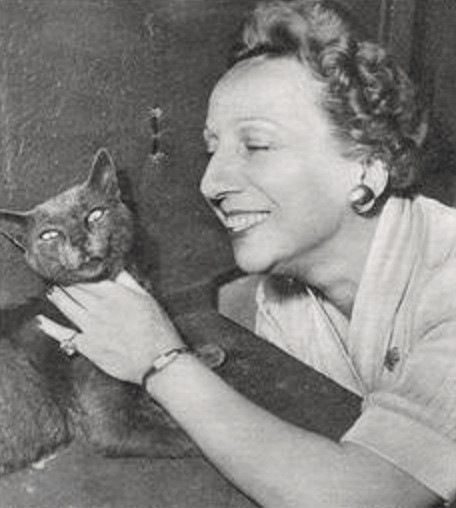
- Tettoni in 1953
- Born: 8 March 1910; Siena, Italy
- Died: 7 March 1998 (aged 87); Rome, Italy
- Occupations: Actress; voice actress
- Years active: 1926–1998

Wanda Tettoni (8 March 1910 – 7 March 1998) was an Italian actress and voice actress.

== Biography ==
Tettoni was born in Siena in Tuscany and she made her big theatre debut in Milan when she was 16 years old. She even pursued an acting career in the radio industry during the 1940s, but she was more famous as a voice actress. She was the official Italian voice of Katharine Hepburn and Agnes Moorehead. Other actresses she dubbed included Jessica Tandy, Mary Wickes, Lucille Ball and Ginger Rogers. Tettoni's Italian dubbed character roles included Aunt Clara (portrayed by Marion Lorne) in Bewitched and the Elder Rose (portrayed by Gloria Stuart) in the 1997 film Titanic. This was one of her final dubbing roles before her death in 1998.

In her animated roles, Tettoni voiced Madame Adelaide Bonfamille in the Italian version of The Aristocats. Her other Disney dubbing roles included Queenie in One Hundred and One Dalmatians, Giddy in Dumbo and the Snooty Flower in Alice in Wonderland. She also dubbed Pearl Slaghoople in The Flintstones.

== Death ==
Tettoni died in Rome on 7 March 1998, one day before her 88th birthday.

== Dubbing roles ==
=== Animation ===
- Madame Adelaide Bonfamille in The Aristocats
- Queenie in One Hundred and One Dalmatians
- Snooty Flower in Alice in Wonderland
- Giddy in Dumbo
- Anastasia in Cinderella
- The Witch in Snow White and the Seven Dwarfs (1972 redub)
- Lila in Snoopy Come Home
- Betty Boop in Who Framed Roger Rabbit
- Granny in Looney Tunes (1960s)
- Pearl Slaghoople in The Flintstones
- Agnes Skinner in The Simpsons (Season 1)

=== Live action ===
- Rose Dawson Calvert in Titanic
- Amanda Bonner in Adam's Rib
- Tracy Lord in The Philadelphia Story
- Pat Pemberton in Pat and Mike
- Lutie Cameron in The Sea of Grass
- Jade Tan in Dragon Seed
- Mary Matthews in State of the Union
- Christine Forrest in Keeper of the Flame
- Ginny in Love Affair
- Clara Schumann in Song of Love
- Jamie Rowan in Without Love
- Rebecca Prescott in How the West Was Won
- Aggie Kennedy in Patch Adams
- Aunt Clara in Bewitched
- Sister Mary Lazarus in Sister Act
- Norma Bates in Psycho
- Baroness Aspasia Conti in Mrs. Parkington
- Christine Hill Cosick in Fourteen Hours
