= Thomas MacDonald (cricketer) =

Personal information
- Full name: Thomas John MacDonald
- Born: 27 December 1908; Comber, County Down, United Kingdom
- Died: 23 March 1998 (aged 89); Middlesbrough, Yorkshire, England
- Batting: Right-handed
- Bowling: Leg break
- Relatives: James MacDonald (brother)

International information
- National side: Ireland

Domestic team information
- Years: Team
- 1934–1936: Lincolnshire
- 1930: Cambridge University
- 1928–1936: Ireland

Career statistics
| Competition | First-class |
|---|---|
| Matches | 7 |
| Runs scored | 291 |
| Batting average | 20.78 |
| 100s/50s | 1/– |
| Top score | 132 |
| Balls bowled | 72 |
| Wickets | – |
| Bowling average | – |
| 5 wickets in innings | – |
| 10 wickets in match | – |
| Best bowling | – |
| Catches/stumpings | 4/– |
- Source: Cricinfo, 24 October 2011

Thomas John MacDonald (27 December 1908 – 23 March 1998) was an Irish cricketer. MacDonald was a right-handed batsman who bowled leg break. He was born at Comber, County Down, Northern Ireland. He was educated initially at the Royal Belfast Academical Institution, before attending Queen's University, Belfast.

MacDonald made his first-class debut for Ireland against the West Indians at College Park, Dublin in 1928. He made five further first-class appearances for Ireland, the last of which came against the Marylebone Cricket Club in 1936. In his six first-class matches for Ireland, he scored 255 runs at an average of 21.25, with a high score of 132. This score, which was his only first-class century, came against Scotland in 1928. While studying the University of Cambridge, MacDonald also made a single first-class appearance Cambridge University against Somerset in 1930. During this match he scored 29 runs in the Cambridge first-innings, before being dismissed by Jack Lee, while in their second-innings he was dismissed for 7 by Arthur Wellard.

He later played Minor counties cricket in England for Lincolnshire, first appearing for the county in the 1934 Minor Counties Championship against Norfolk. He made six further appearances for the county, the last of which came against Hertfordshire in 1936. In later life he became a schoolmaster. He died at Middlesbrough, Yorkshire, England on 23 March 1998. He survived his brother James, who also played first-class cricket for Ireland by nearly thirty years.
