= Peter Nilson =

Swedish astronomer and novelist

- Born: 17 October 1937; Näsby, Sweden
- Died: 8 March 1998 (aged 60)
- Education: Uppsala University
- Occupations: astronomer and novelist
- Writing career
- Genres: scientific essays science fiction
- Notable work: Rymdväktaren

Peter Nilson (17 October 1937 – 8 March 1998) was a Swedish astronomer and novelist. Active at Uppsala University, he compiled a catalogue of galaxies containing nearly 13,000 entries. He was appreciated for a number of essay books (primarily about science) and for a number of science fiction novels such as Rymdväktaren, or "The Space Guardian" and Nyaga.

He was born in the Smålandian village of Näsby and was in the early teens a farmer, but science, with its celebrities such as Charles Darwin and Albert Einstein made such an impression on him, as to motivate him to accomplish college studies by letter correspondence. In the early 1960s he began his studies in Uppsala University, initially in mathematics, and thereafter theoretical physics, aesthetics, history of ideas and astronomy.

He was elected a member of the Royal Swedish Academy of Sciences in 1993.

== Works ==
- Lysande stjärnor (1970)
- Uppsala General Catalogue of Galaxies (1973)
- Upptäckten av universum (1975)
- Himlavalvets sällsamheter (1977)
- Trollkarlen (1979)
- Främmande världar (1980)
- Arken (1982)
- Mitt i labyrinten (1983)
- Guldspiken (1985)
- Avgrundsbok (1987)
- Äventyret (1989)
- Messias med träbenet (1990)
- Stjärnvägar (1991)
- Rymdljus (1992)
- Solvindar (1993)
- Hem till jorden (1994)
- Rymdväktaren (1995)
- Nyaga (1996)
- Den gamla byn (1997). Illustrated by Björn Gidstam
- Ljuden från kosmos (2000, posthumous publication)
