= Eleanor Ileen Johnson =

American telephone operator and survivor of RMS Titanic

Eleanor Shuman
- Johnson in 1997
- Born: Eleanor Ileen Johnson; August 23, 1910; St. Charles, Illinois
- Died: March 7, 1998 (aged 87); Elgin, Illinois
- Spouse: Delbert Shuman
- Parent(s): Oskar Johnson and Alina Backberg
- Relatives: Harold Johnson (brother)

Eleanor Ileen Shuman (née Johnson; August 23, 1910 – March 7, 1998) was an American telephone operator and one of the last remaining survivors of the sinking of RMS Titanic in 1912.

== Early life ==
Eleanor Ileen Johnson was born in St. Charles, Illinois to newspaper editor Oscar Walter Johnson and his wife, Aliina Vilhelmina Backberg (1885–1968). She had an older brother, Harold Theodore (1908–1968).

In early 1912, Alina and her two children had been in Finland visiting her dying father. When they arrived back in England, they were informed that due to a coal strike, the ship they were supposed to sail on had cancelled its trip. It was only at the last minute that they were informed that Titanic had space available. They bought third class tickets to go to New York to get jobs and visit relatives.

== Aboard the Titanic ==
Aged around 20 months, Eleanor boarded Titanic along with her mother and brother as third class passengers on April 10, 1912, at Southampton, England. They shared a cabin with Elin Braf and Helmina Nilsson. Shortly after the ship struck the iceberg at 11:40 p.m. on April 14, Alina and a cabin mate went out on deck and kicked around pieces of ice that had fallen off the iceberg until an officer told them to get back in their cabins as the ship would be on its way soon. Not long after, a steward who had waited on the Johnsons in the dining room and took a liking to them, knocked on their door and, with a group of fellow Swedes, escorted them to the boat deck and to Collapsible D. Alina was helped into the boat with Eleanor in her arms and called up to Braf to get in with Harold. Braf remained frozen on deck, so a crewman took Harold from her arms and tossed him into the boat, leaving Braf behind, despite Alina's calls to her. She died in the sinking, although Nilsson did escape the ship, possibly in Lifeboat 13. Alina and her children were picked up by the rescue ship RMS Carpathia and arrived in New York City on April 18.

Eleanor admitted that she remembered very little about the night the ship sank, but she insisted that she recalled the screams of passengers and the sight of hands reaching up to her from a lifeboat below.

In 1958, Eleanor and Harold attended the New York City premiere of A Night to Remember.

== Marriage and career ==
In 1934, Johnson married Delbert Shuman, an International Harvester engineer, and had a son, Earl. They moved to Elgin, Illinois and were married for forty-seven years before he died in 1981. Eleanor worked for the Elgin Watch Company, and later as a telephone operator until her retirement in 1962.

== Later life and death ==
In 1994, Shuman visited her son in Florida, and it was the first time she had seen the Atlantic Ocean since 1912.

Into her 80s, Shuman remained active in Titanic-related activities. In August 1996, she joined fellow Titanic survivors Michel Navratil and Edith Brown on an expedition cruise to the site of Titanic's wreck. She was the only survivor that director James Cameron met while filming Titanic, and as such, received royal treatment. She saw the movie three times, including at a special screening with movie critics Gene Siskel and Roger Ebert. She became an instant celebrity after the movie's release, and she had to change her telephone number to an unlisted one after receiving several phone calls every day from people hoping to speak with her.

Shuman died in Elgin, Illinois, on March 7th, 1998 at a hospital near her home at the age of 87. Her death left five remaining Titanic survivors. She was the penultimate remaining American-born survivor, as well as the penultimate remaining survivor who did not lose any relatives in the sinking.
