= Arctic =

Polar region of the Earth's northern hemisphere

The Arctic Circle, currently at roughly 66° north of the Equator, defines the boundary of the Arctic seas and lands

A political map showing land ownership within the Arctic region

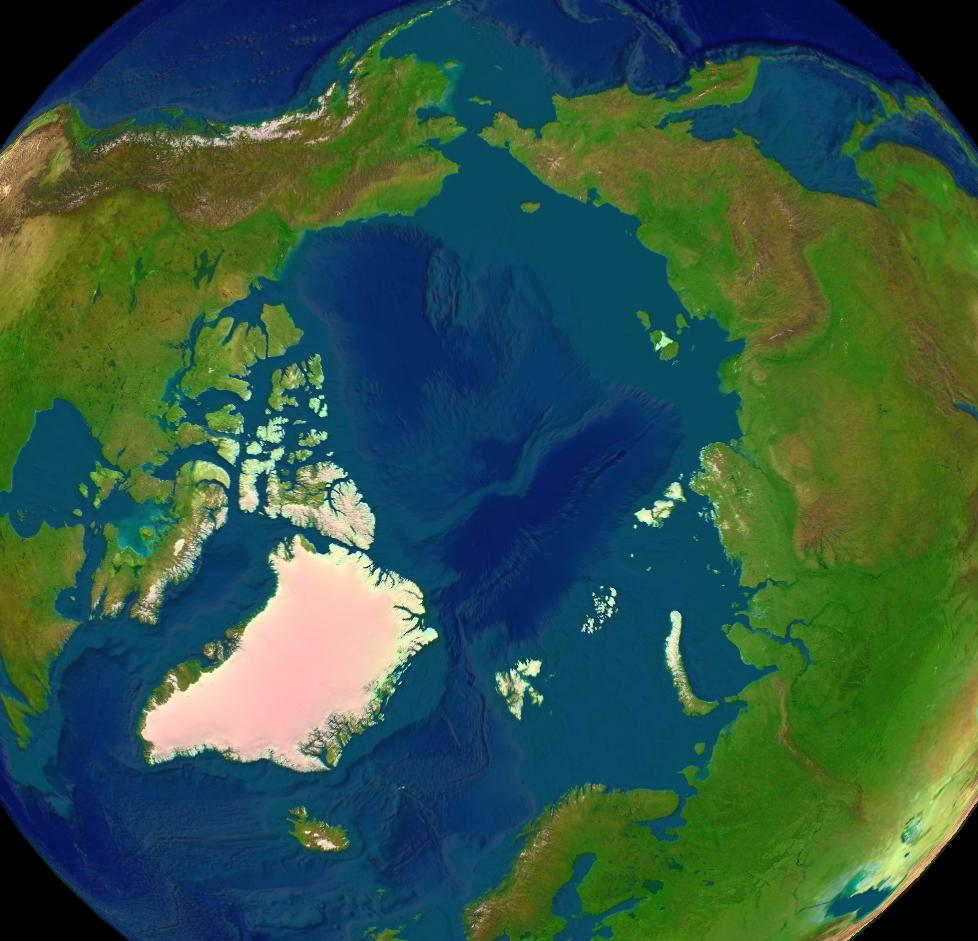
Artificially coloured topographical map of the Arctic region

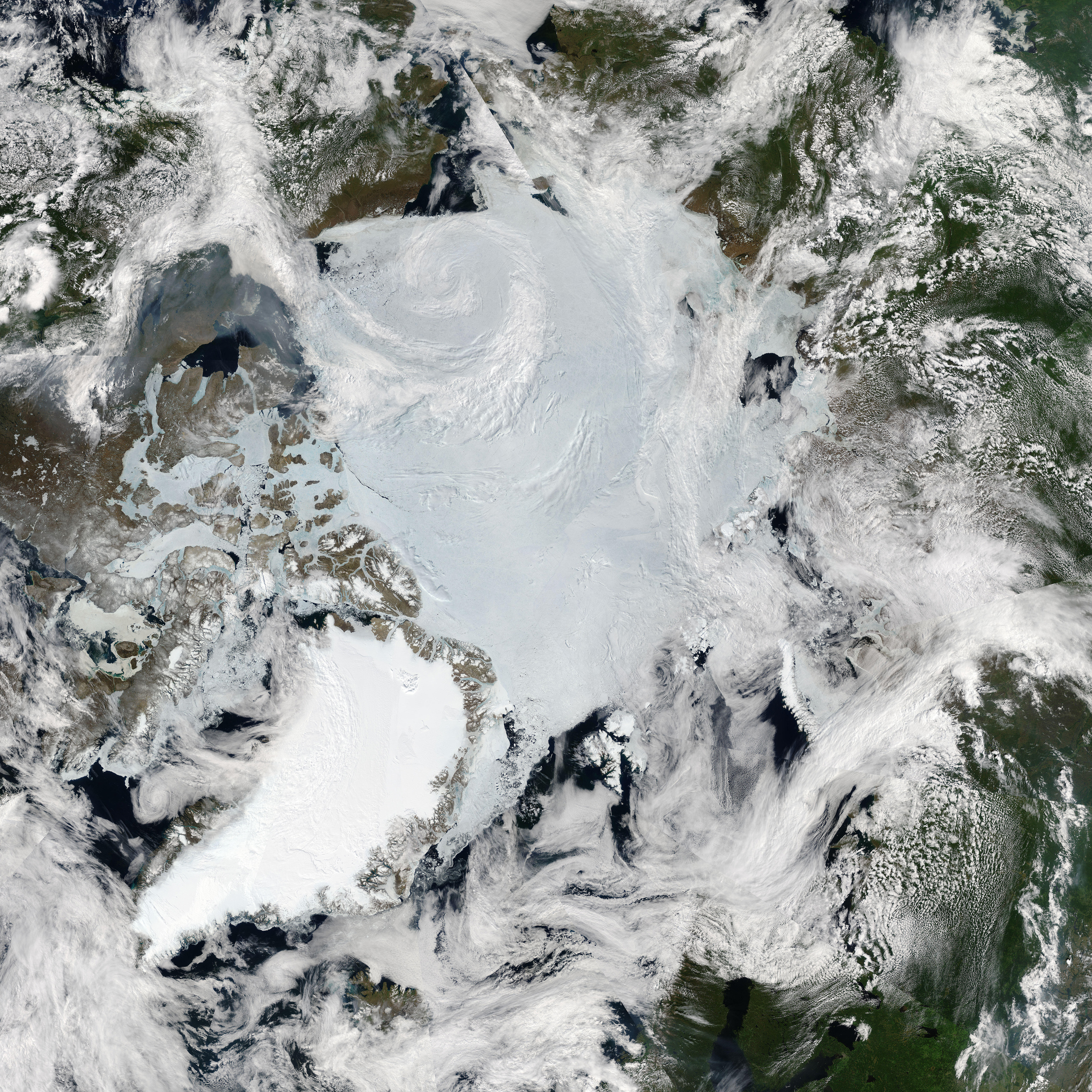
MODIS image of the Arctic

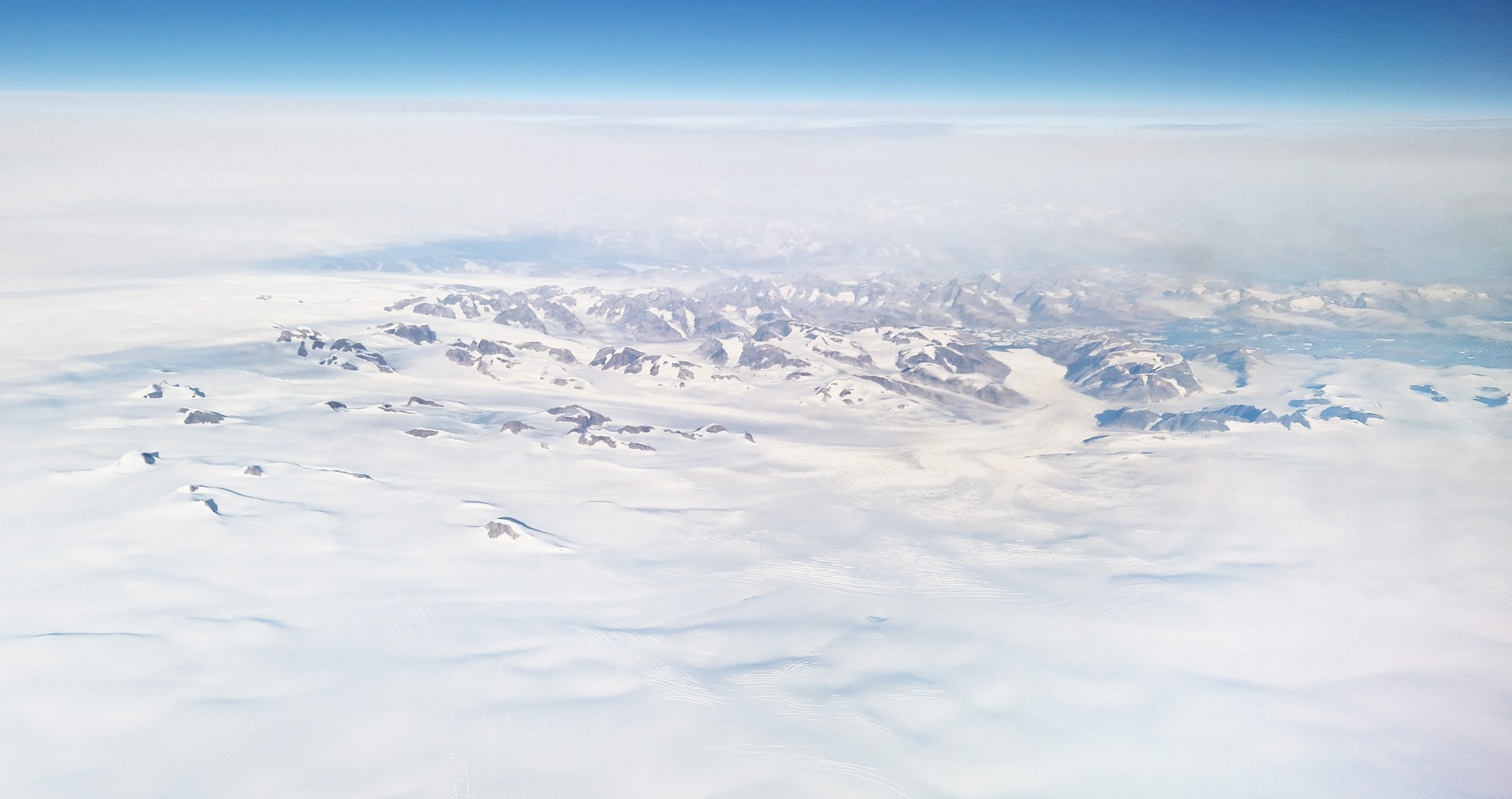
Aerial photo of the Greenlandic Ice Sheet

The Arctic (/ˈɑːr(k)tɪk/; (Note: The word was originally pronounced without the /k/ sound, but the pronunciation with the /k/ sound is nowadays very common. The c was added to the spelling for etymological reasons and then began to be pronounced.) from Ancient Greek ἄρκτος (árktos) 'bear') is the polar region of Earth that surrounds the North Pole, lying north of the Arctic Circle. The Arctic region, from the IERS Reference Meridian travelling east, consists of parts of northern Norway (Nordland, Troms, Finnmark, Svalbard and Jan Mayen), northernmost Sweden (Västerbotten, Norrbotten and Lappland), northern Finland (North Ostrobothnia, Kainuu and Lappi), Russia (Murmansk, Siberia, Nenets Okrug, Novaya Zemlya), the United States (Alaska), Canada (Yukon, Northwest Territories, Nunavut), Danish Realm (Greenland), and northern Iceland (Grímsey and Kolbeinsey), along with the Arctic Ocean and adjacent seas.

Land within the Arctic region has seasonally varying snow and ice cover, with predominantly treeless permafrost under the tundra. Arctic seas contain seasonal sea ice in many places.

The Arctic region is a unique area among Earth's ecosystems. The cultures in the region and the Arctic indigenous peoples have adapted to its cold and extreme conditions. Life in the Arctic includes zooplankton and phytoplankton, fish and marine mammals, birds, land animals, plants, and human societies. Arctic land is bordered by the subarctic.

== Definition and etymology ==
The word Arctic comes from the Greek word ἀρκτικός arktikos "near the Bear, northern" and from the word ἄρκτος arktos meaning "bear," named for either the constellation known as Ursa Major, the "Great Bear", which is prominent in the northern portion of the celestial sphere, or the constellation Ursa Minor, the "Little Bear", which contains the celestial north pole (currently very near Polaris, the current north Pole Star, or North Star).

There are several definitions of what area is contained within the Arctic. The area can be defined as north of the Arctic Circle (about 66° 34'N), the approximate southern limit of the midnight sun and the polar night. Another definition of the Arctic, which is popular with ecologists, is the region in the Northern Hemisphere where the average temperature for the warmest month (July) is below 10 °C (50 °F); the northernmost tree line roughly follows the isotherm at the boundary of this region.

== Climate ==
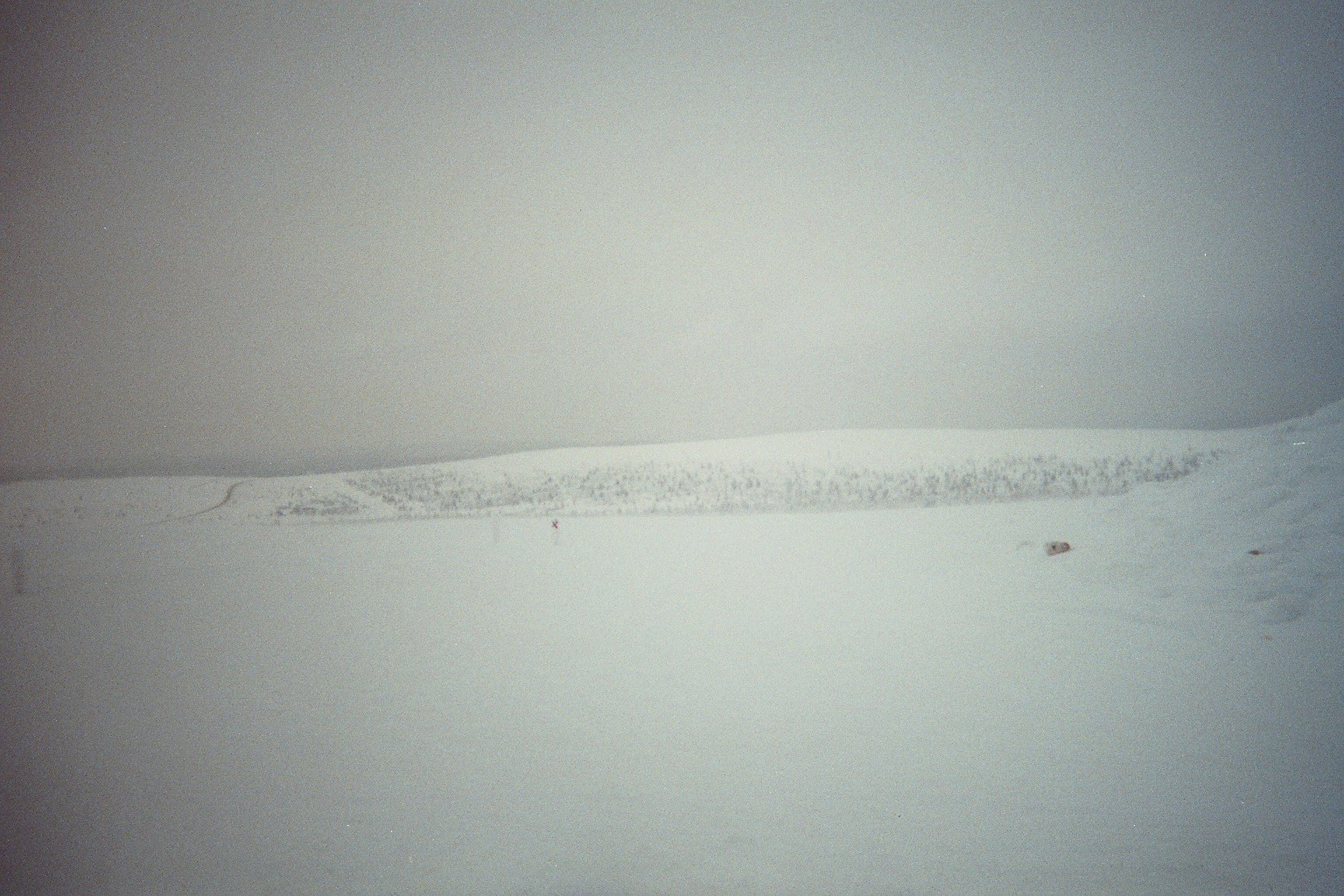
A snowy landscape of Inari located in Lapland (Finland)

The climate of the Arctic region is characterized by cold winters and cool summers. Its precipitation mostly comes in the form of snow and is low, with most of the area receiving less than 50 cm (20 in). High winds often stir up snow, creating the illusion of continuous snowfall. Average winter temperatures can go as low as −40 °C (−40 °F), and the coldest recorded temperature is approximately −68 °C (−90 °F). Coastal Arctic climates are moderated by oceanic influences, having generally warmer temperatures and heavier snowfalls than the colder and drier interior areas. The Arctic is affected by current global warming, leading to climate change in the Arctic, including Arctic sea ice decline, diminished ice in the Greenland ice sheet, and Arctic methane emissions as the permafrost thaws. The melting of Greenland's ice sheet is linked to polar amplification.

Due to the poleward migration of the planet's isotherms (about 56 km (35 mi) per decade during the past 30 years as a consequence of global warming), the Arctic region (as defined by tree line and temperature) is currently shrinking. Perhaps the most alarming result of this is Arctic sea ice shrinkage. There is a large variance in predictions of Arctic sea ice loss, with models showing near-complete to complete loss in September from 2035 to sometime around 2067.

== Flora and fauna ==
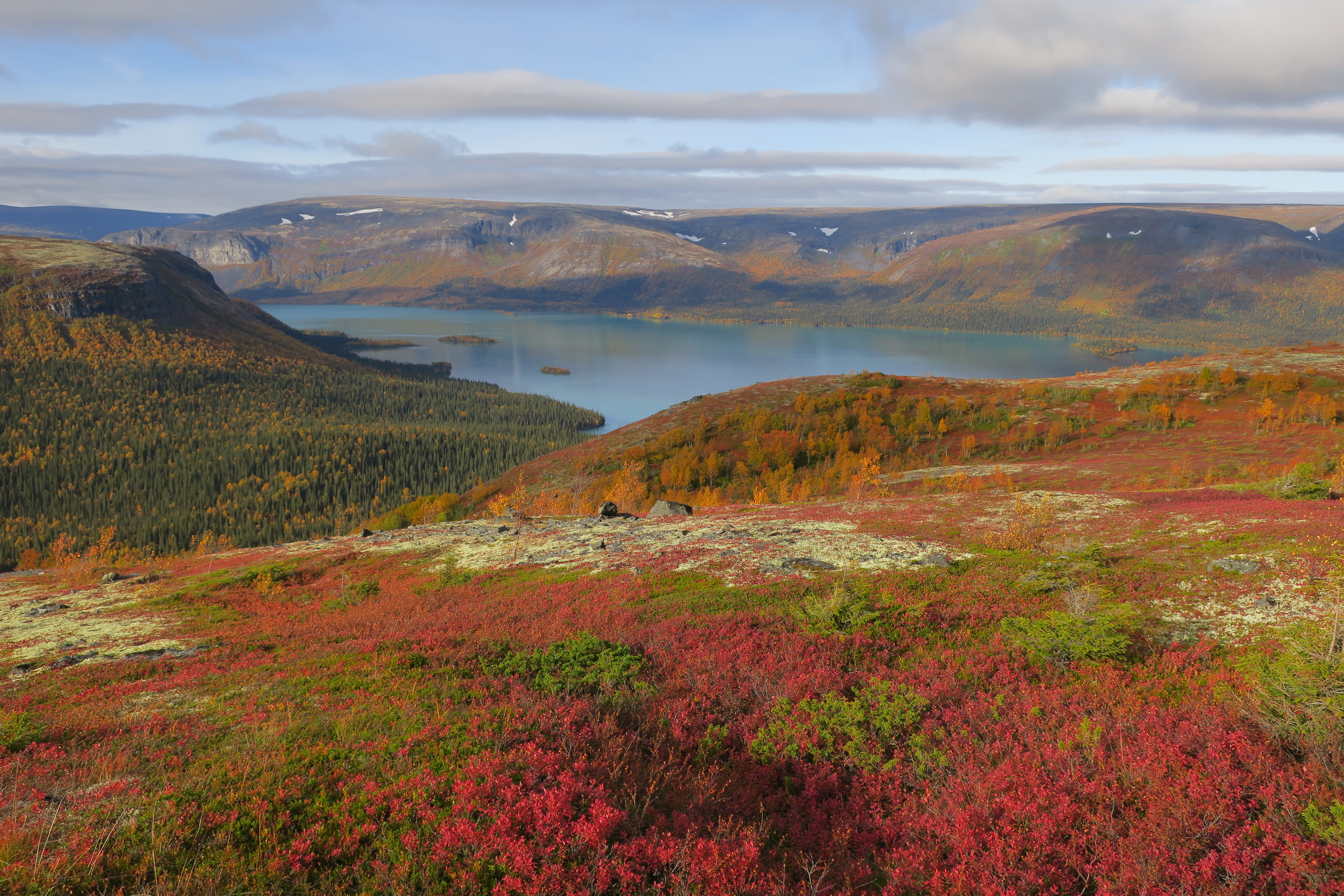
Arctic vegetation in autumn displays some of the most intense and vivid colors seen on Earth (Lake Seydozero, Murmansk Oblast, Russia)

Arctic life is characterized by adaptation to short growing seasons with long periods of sunlight, and cold, dark, snow-covered winter conditions, with soil depth constrained by permafrost. In the Arctic Circle, up to 24 hours of daylight is experienced at the summer solstice in June and up to 24 hours of darkness during the winter solstice in December which has an important impact on the ecology of the region.

=== Plants ===
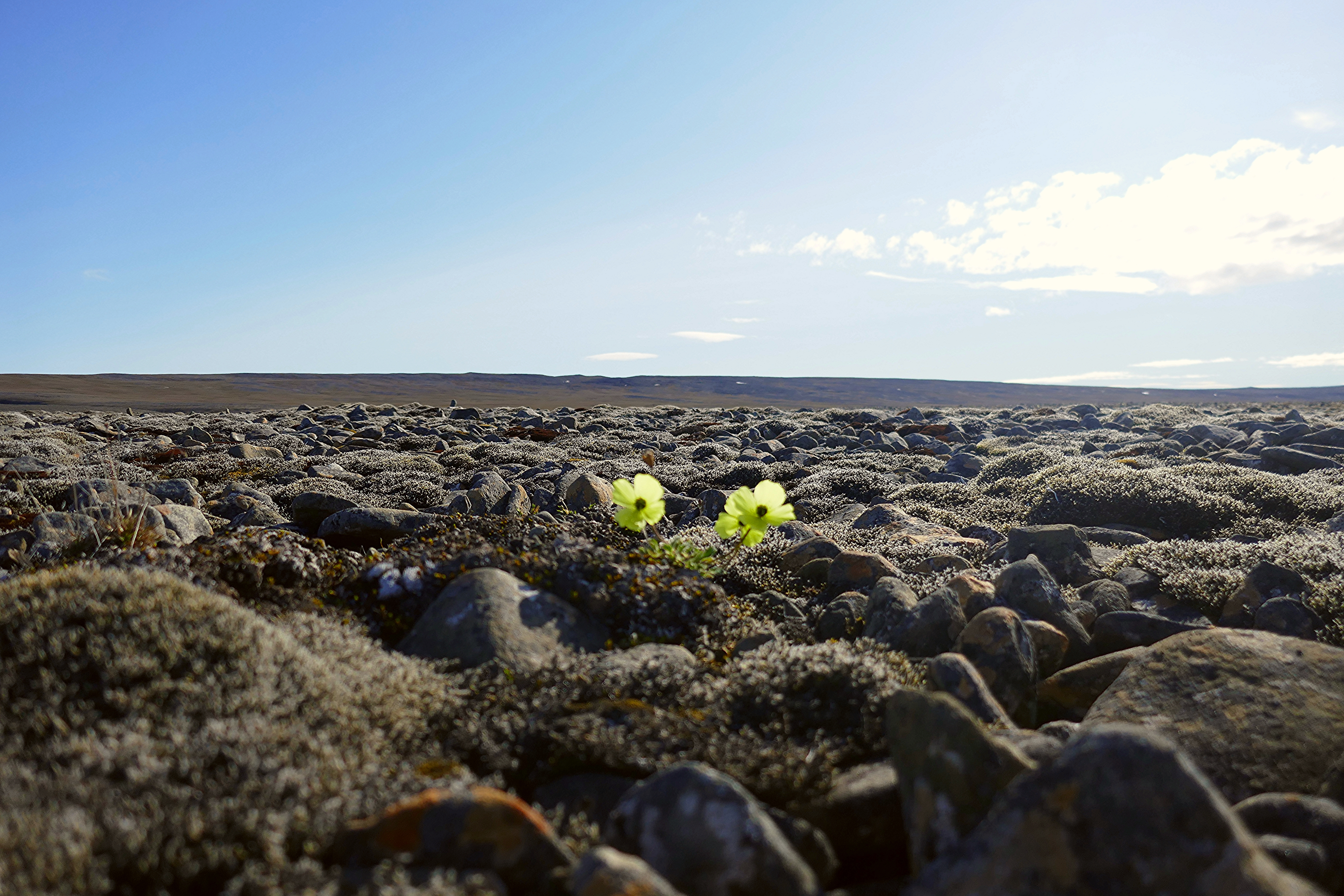
Arctic poppy in bloom within the Qausuittuq National Park on Bathurst Island (Nunavut, Canada)

Arctic vegetation is composed of plants such as dwarf shrubs, graminoids, herbs, lichens, and mosses, which all grow relatively close to the ground, forming tundra. An example of a dwarf shrub is the bearberry. As one moves northward, the amount of warmth available for plant growth decreases considerably. In the northernmost areas, plants are at their metabolic limits, and small differences in the total amount of summer warmth make large differences in the amount of energy available for maintenance, growth, and reproduction. Colder summer temperatures cause the size, abundance, productivity, and variety of plants to decrease. Trees cannot grow in the Arctic, but in its warmest parts, shrubs are common and can reach 2 m (6 ft 7 in) in height; sedges, mosses and lichens can form thick layers. In the coldest parts of the Arctic, much of the ground is bare; non-vascular plants such as lichens and mosses predominate, along with a few scattered grasses and forbs (like the Arctic poppy).

=== Animals ===
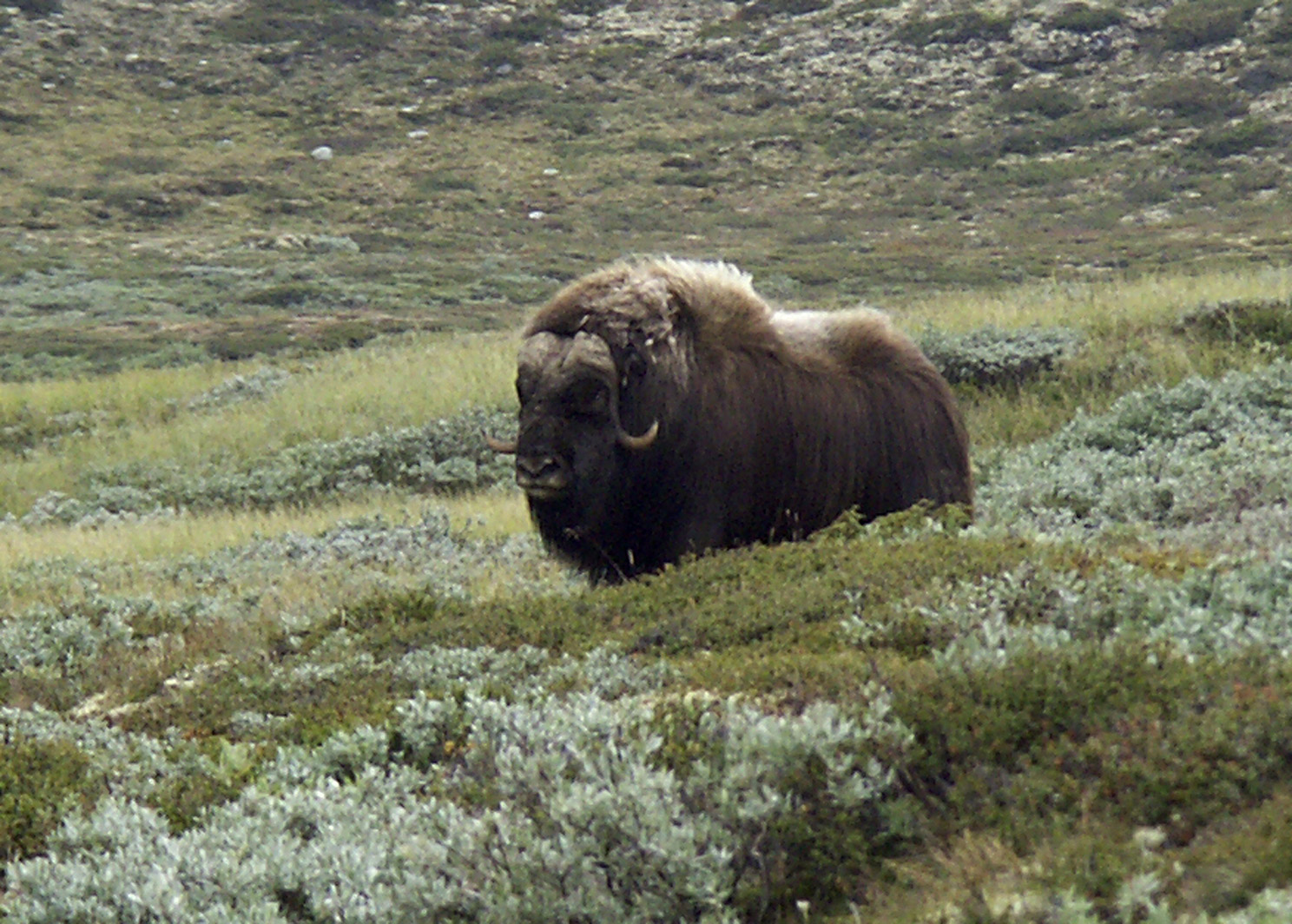
Muskox

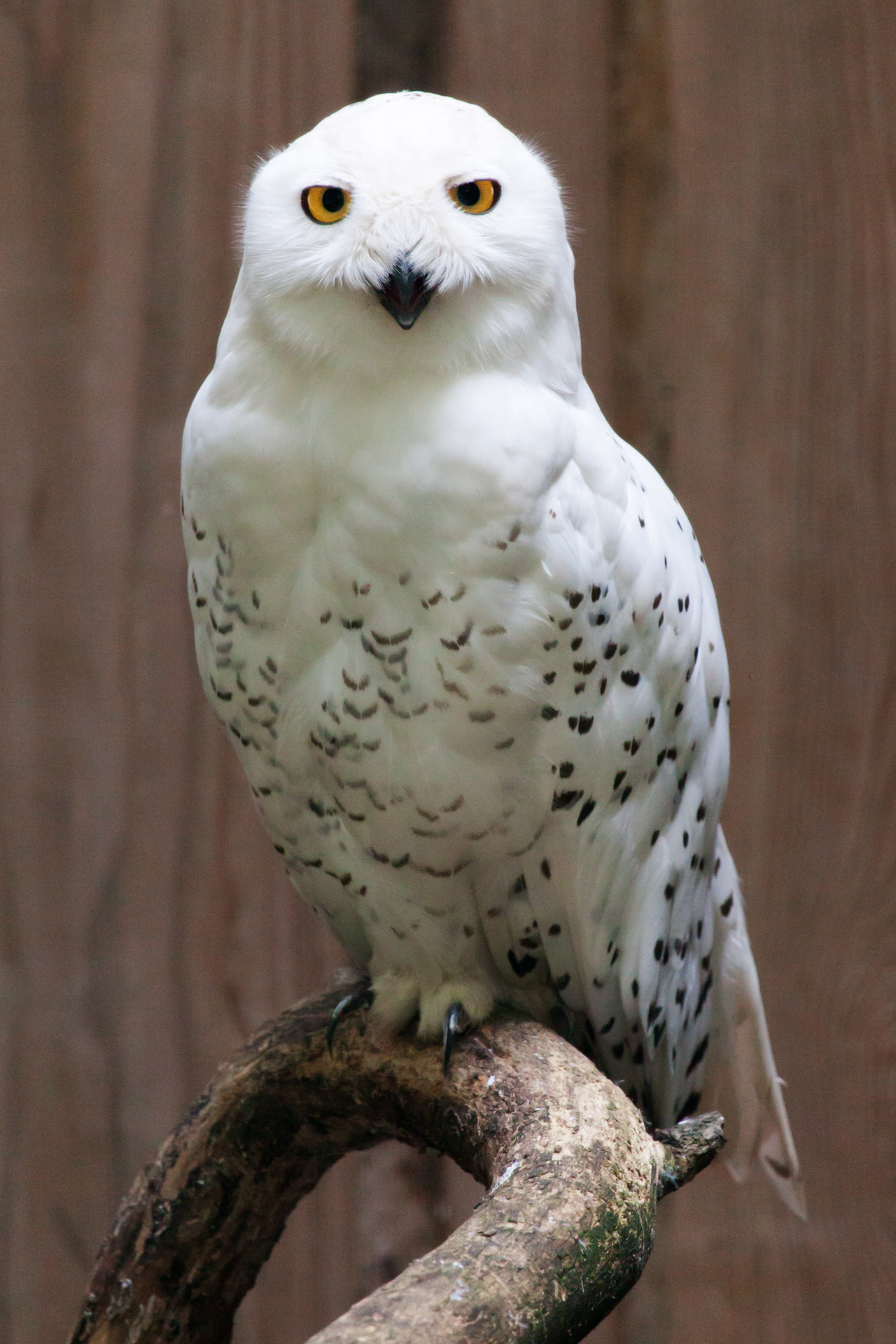
A snowy owl

Herbivores on the tundra include the Arctic hare, lemming, muskox, and reindeer (caribou). They are preyed on by the snowy owl, Arctic fox, grizzly bear, and Arctic wolf. The polar bear is also a predator, though it prefers to hunt for marine life from the ice. There are also many birds (some 200 species breed in the Arctic) and marine species endemic to the colder regions. Other terrestrial animals include wolverines, moose, Dall sheep, ermines, and Arctic ground squirrels. Marine mammals include seals, walruses, and several species of cetacean—baleen whales and also narwhals, orcas, and belugas.

== Natural resources ==
There are copious natural resources in the Arctic (oil, gas, minerals, freshwater, fish, and, if the subarctic is included, forest) to which modern technology and the economic opening up of Russia have given significant new opportunities. The interest in the tourism industry is also on the increase.

The Arctic contains some of the last and most extensive continuous wilderness areas in the world, and its significance in preserving biodiversity and genotypes is considerable. The increasing presence of humans fragments vital habitats. The Arctic is particularly susceptible to the abrasion of groundcover and to the disturbance of the rare breeding grounds of the animals that are characteristic of the region. The Arctic also holds 1/5 of the Earth's water supply.

== Paleontology ==
During the Cretaceous period, the Arctic still had seasonal snows, though only a light dusting and not enough to permanently hinder plant growth. Animals such as the Chasmosaurus, Hypacrosaurus, Troodon, and Edmontosaurus may have all migrated north to take advantage of the summer growing season, and migrated south to warmer climes when winter came. A similar situation may also have been found amongst dinosaurs that lived in Antarctic regions, such as the Muttaburrasaurus of Australia.

However, others claim that dinosaurs lived year-round at very high latitudes, such as near the Colville River, which is now at about 70° N but at the time (70 million years ago) was 10° further north.

== Indigenous population ==
Maps showing the decline of the Dorset culture and expansion of the Thule from c. 900 to 1500

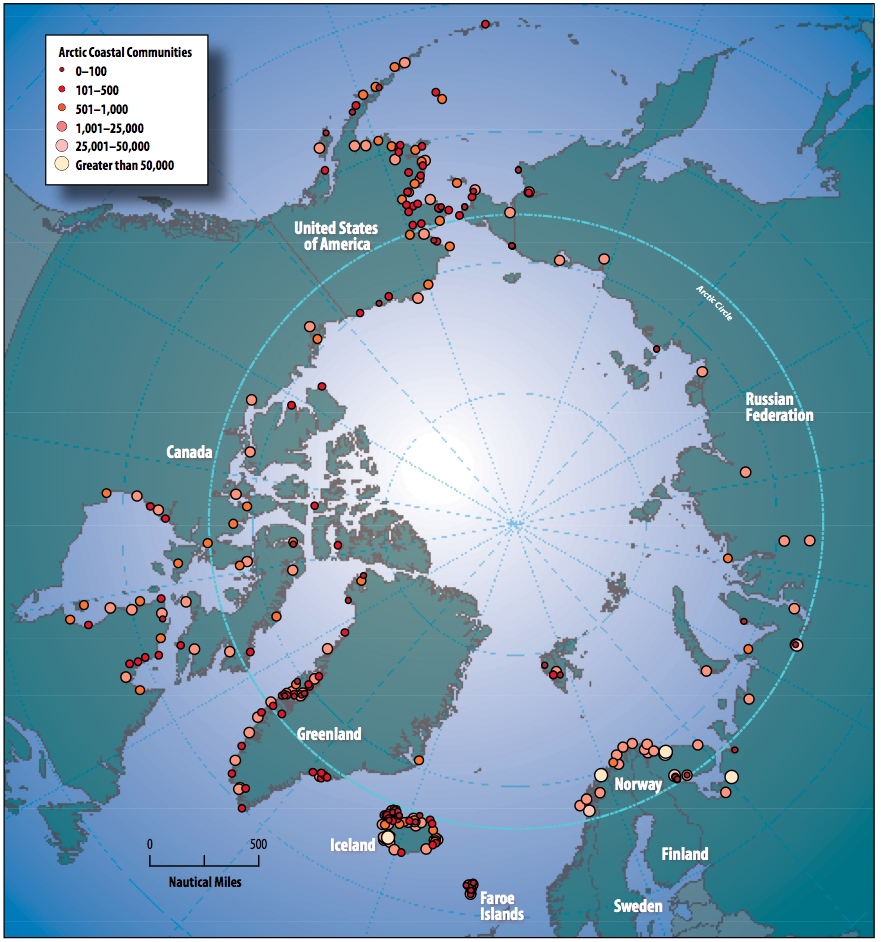
Circumpolar coastal human population distribution c. 2009 (includes indigenous and non-indigenous).

The earliest inhabitants of North America's central and eastern Arctic are referred to as the Arctic small tool tradition (AST) and existed c. 2500 BCE. AST consisted of several Paleo-Eskimo cultures, including the Independence cultures and Pre-Dorset cultures. The Dorset culture (Inuktitut: Tuniit or Tunit) refers to the next inhabitants of central and eastern Arctic. The Dorset culture emerged across the North American Arctic through a gradual process of cultural and technological adaptation to changing environmental conditions and resource availability between 1050 and 500 BCE. With the exception of the Quebec / Labrador peninsula, the Dorset culture vanished around 1500 CE. Supported by genetic testing, evidence shows that descendants of the Dorset culture, known as the Sadlermiut, survived in Aivilik, Southampton and Coats Islands, until the beginning of the 20th century.

The Dorset / Thule culture transition dates around the ninth–10th centuries CE. Scientists theorize that there may have been cross-contact between the two cultures with the sharing of technology, such as fashioning harpoon heads, or the Thule may have found Dorset remnants and adapted their ways with the predecessor culture. The evidence suggested that Inuit descend from the Birnirk of Siberia, through the Thule culture expanded into northern Canada and Greenland, where they genetically and culturally completely replaced the Indigenous Dorset people sometime after 1300 CE. The question of why the Dorset disappeared so completely has led some to suggest that Thule invaders wiped out the Dorset people in "an example of prehistoric genocide."

By 1300 CE, the Inuit, present-day Arctic inhabitants and descendants of Thule culture, had settled in west Greenland and moved into east Greenland over the following century (Inughuit, Kalaallit and Tunumiit are modern Greenlandic Inuit groups descended from Thule). Over time, the Inuit have migrated throughout the Arctic regions of Eastern Russia, the United States, Canada, and Greenland.

Other Circumpolar North indigenous peoples include the Chukchi, Evenks, Iñupiat, Khanty, Koryaks, Nenets, Sámi, Yukaghir, Gwichʼin, and Yupik.

== International cooperation and politics ==
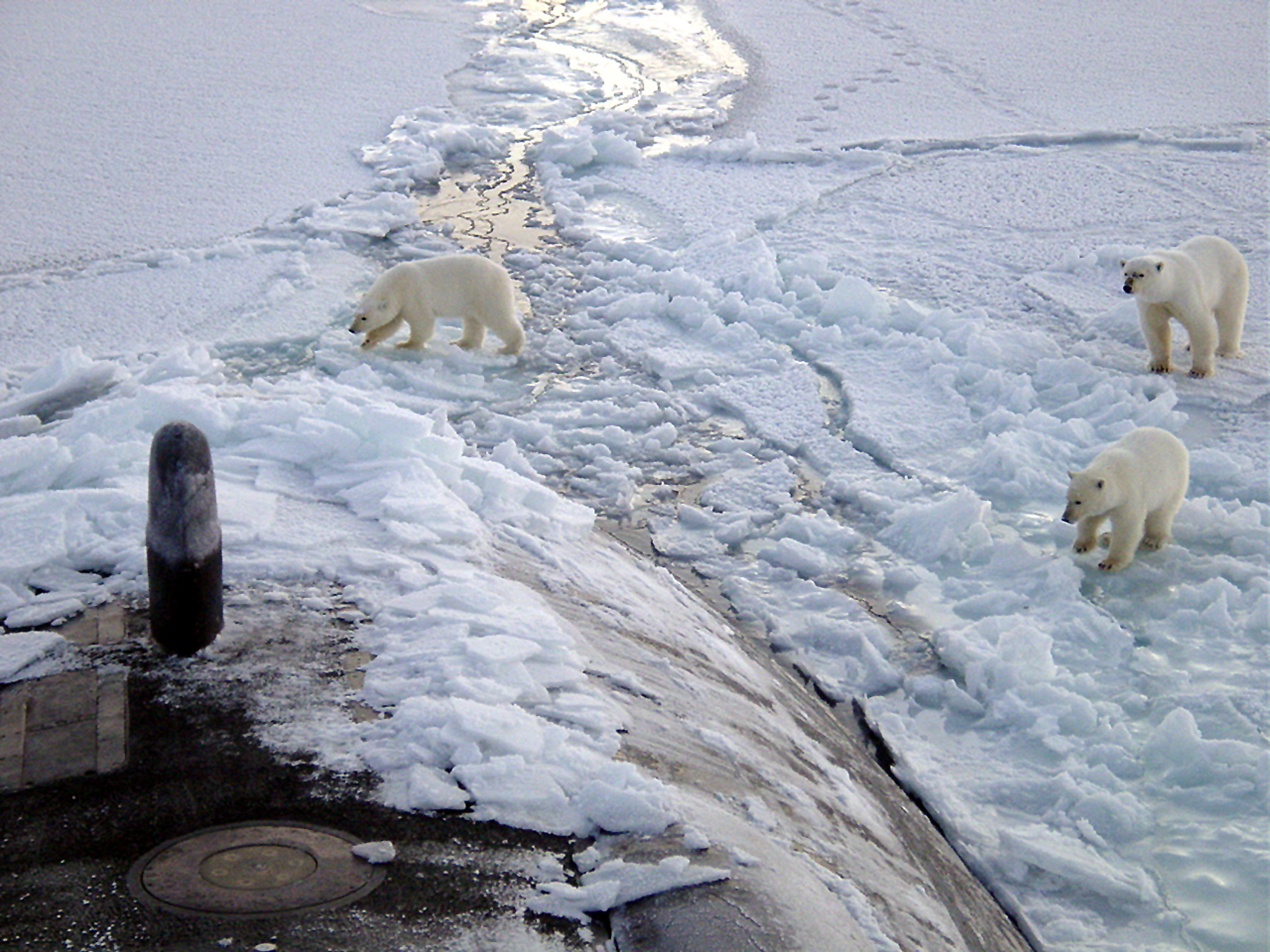
Polar bears on the sea ice of the Arctic Ocean, near the North Pole. USS Honolulu pictured.

The eight Arctic nations (Canada, Kingdom of Denmark [Greenland & The Faroe Islands], Finland, Iceland, Norway, Sweden, Russia, and US) are all members of the Arctic Council, as are organizations representing six indigenous populations (The Aleut International Association, Arctic Athabaskan Council, Gwich'in Council International, Inuit Circumpolar Council, Russian Association of Indigenous Peoples of the North, and Saami Council). The council operates on a consensus basis, mostly dealing with environmental treaties and not addressing boundary or resource disputes.

Though Arctic policy priorities differ, every Arctic nation is concerned about sovereignty/defense, resource development, shipping routes, and environmental protection. Much work remains on regulatory agreements regarding shipping, tourism, and resource development in Arctic waters. Arctic shipping is subject to some regulatory control through the International Code for Ships Operating in Polar Waters, adopted by the International Maritime Organization on 1 January 2017 and applies to all ships in Arctic waters over 500 tonnes.

Research in the Arctic has long been a collaborative international effort, evidenced by the International Polar Year. The International Arctic Science Committee, hundreds of scientists and specialists of the Arctic Council, and the Barents Euro-Arctic Council are more examples of collaborative international Arctic research.

=== Territorial claims ===
While there are several ongoing territorial claims in the Arctic, no country owns the geographic North Pole or the region of the Arctic Ocean surrounding it. The surrounding six Arctic states that border the Arctic Ocean—Canada, the Kingdom of Denmark (with Greenland), Iceland, Norway, Russia, and the United States—are limited to a 200 nautical miles (370 km; 230 mi) exclusive economic zone (EEZ) off their coasts. Two Arctic states (Finland and Sweden) do not have direct access to the Arctic Ocean.

Upon ratification of the United Nations Convention on the Law of the Sea, a country has ten years to make claims to an extended continental shelf beyond its 200 nautical mile zone. Due to this, Norway (which ratified the convention in 1996), Russia (ratified in 1997), Canada (ratified in 2003) and the Kingdom of Denmark (ratified in 2004) launched projects to establish claims that certain sectors of the Arctic seabed should belong to their territories.

On 2 August 2007, two Russian bathyscaphes, MIR-1 and MIR-2, for the first time in history descended to the Arctic seabed beneath the North Pole and placed there a Russian flag made of rust-proof titanium alloy. The flag-placing, during Arktika 2007, generated commentary on and concern for a race for control of the Arctic's vast hydrocarbon resources.

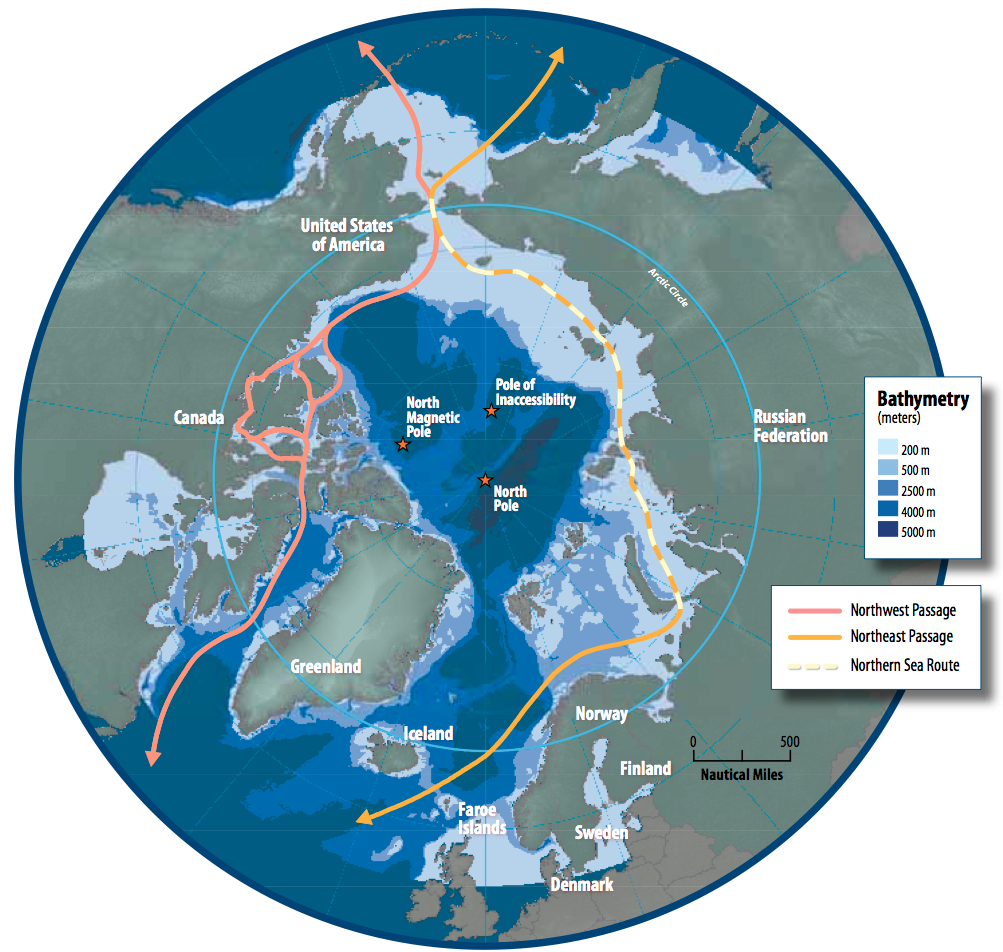
Map of the Arctic region showing the Northeast Passage, the Northern Sea Route within it, and the Northwest Passage.

Foreign ministers and other officials representing Canada, the Kingdom of Denmark, Norway, Russia, and the United States met in Ilulissat, Greenland on 28 May 2008 at the Arctic Ocean Conference and announced the Ilulissat Declaration, blocking any "new comprehensive international legal regime to govern the Arctic Ocean," and pledging "the orderly settlement of any possible overlapping claims."

As of 2012, the Kingdom of Denmark is claiming the continental shelf based on the Lomonosov Ridge between Greenland and over the North Pole to the northern limit of the exclusive economic zone of Russia.

The Russian Federation is also claiming a large swath of seabed along the Lomonosov Ridge but, unlike Denmark, confined its claim to its side of the Arctic region. In August 2015, Russia made a supplementary submission for the expansion of the external borders of its continental shelf in the Arctic Ocean, asserting that the eastern part of the Lomonosov Ridge and the Mendeleyev Ridge is an extension of the Eurasian continent. In August 2016, the UN Commission on the Limits of the Continental Shelf began to consider Russia's submission.

Canada claims the Northwest Passage as part of its internal waters belonging to Canada, while the United States and most maritime nations regards it as an international strait, which means that foreign vessels have right of transit passage.

=== Strategic competition ===
The Arctic is a site of strategic competition between world powers, particularly Russia and NATO. Russia's Northern Fleet, stationed in the Kola Peninsula, is a major element of its nuclear deterrence strategy. Russia also conducts nuclear weapons tests on Novaya Zemlya, and has sought to promote the use of the Northern Sea Route in international maritime trade. The Trump administration has focused US attention on the Arctic, with Trump threatening to invade Greenland in 2025 and 2026, seeing direct control over it as essential to US strategic interests. In response to Trump, the United States's NATO allies have sought to divert US attention toward Russian Arctic activities and bolster their own readiness. Two strategically important straits in the Arctic are the GIUK Gap and the Bear Gap, between Svalbard and Norway.

=== Exploration ===
Since 1937, the larger portion of the Asian-side Arctic region has been extensively explored by Soviet and Russian crewed drifting ice stations. Between 1937 and 1991, 88 international polar crews established and occupied scientific settlements on the drift ice and were carried thousands of kilometers by the ice flow. Modern day scientists now rely more heavily on unmanned buoys and ice-tethered observatories than crewed stations for Arctic research and exploration

=== Pollution ===
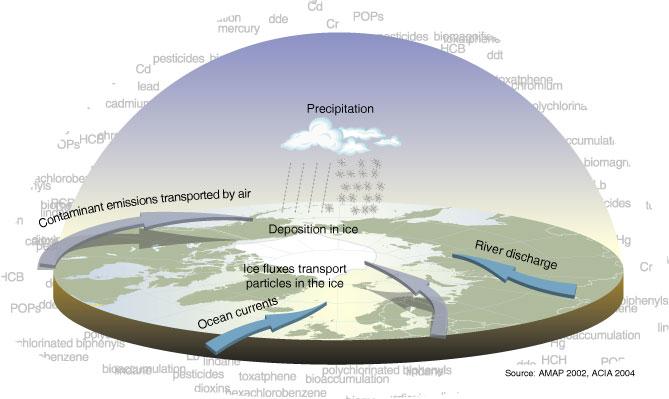
Long-range pollution pathways to the Arctic

The Arctic is comparatively clean, although there are certain ecologically difficult localized pollution problems that present a serious threat to people's health living around these pollution sources. Due to the prevailing worldwide sea and air currents, the Arctic area is the fallout region for long-range transport pollutants, and in some places, the concentrations exceed the levels of densely populated urban areas. An example of this is the phenomenon of Arctic haze, which is commonly blamed on long-range pollutants. Another example is with the bioaccumulation of PCBs (polychlorinated biphenyls) in Arctic wildlife and people.

=== Preservation ===
There have been many proposals to preserve the Arctic over the years. Most recently a group of states at the United Nations Conference on Sustainable Development, on 21 June 2012, proposed protecting the Arctic, similar to the Antarctic Treaty System. The initial focus of the campaign will be a UN resolution creating a global sanctuary around the pole, and a ban on oil drilling and unsustainable fishing in the Arctic.

The Arctic has climate change rates that are amongst the highest in the world. Due to the major impacts to the region from climate change the near climate future of the region will be extremely different under all scenarios of warming.

== Climate change ==
Decade-by-decade progression of arctic sea ice melting shows continued ice loss, with the greatest percentage loss rate experienced in the late summer and early autumn. Center of chart would be zero ice.

The area of Arctic sea ice reached a minimum in September 2012, but recent years have shown less area than 2012 in other months. Late summer shows the greatest percentage loss.

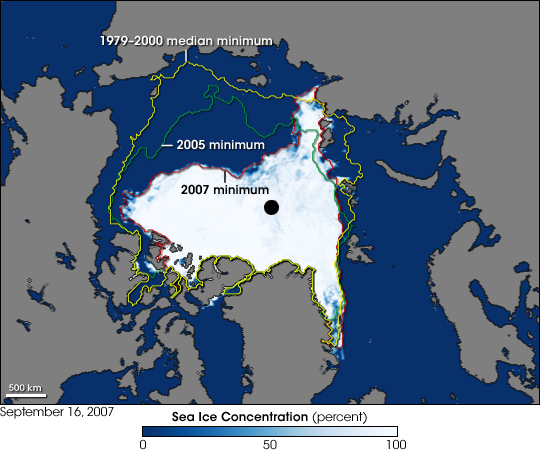
Arctic sea ice coverage as of 2007 compared to 2005 and compared to 1979–2000 average

The effects of climate change in the Arctic include rising temperatures, loss of sea ice, and melting of the Greenland ice sheet. The Arctic near-surface temperature is increasing at a rate that is 2–3 times faster than the global average, which is referred to as Arctic amplification. Potential methane release from the region, especially through the thawing of permafrost and methane clathrates, is also a concern. Because of the amplified response of the Arctic to global warming, it is often seen as a leading indicator of global warming. The melting of Greenland's ice sheet is linked to polar amplification.

The Arctic region is especially vulnerable to the effects of any climate change, as has become apparent with the reduction of sea ice in recent years. Climate models predict much greater climate change in the Arctic than the global average, resulting in significant international attention to the region. In particular, there are concerns that Arctic shrinkage, a consequence of melting glaciers and other ice in Greenland, could soon contribute to a substantial rise in sea levels worldwide.

The current Arctic warming is leading to ancient carbon being released from thawing permafrost, leading to methane and carbon dioxide production by micro-organisms. Release of methane and carbon dioxide stored in permafrost could cause abrupt and severe global warming, as they are potent greenhouse gases.

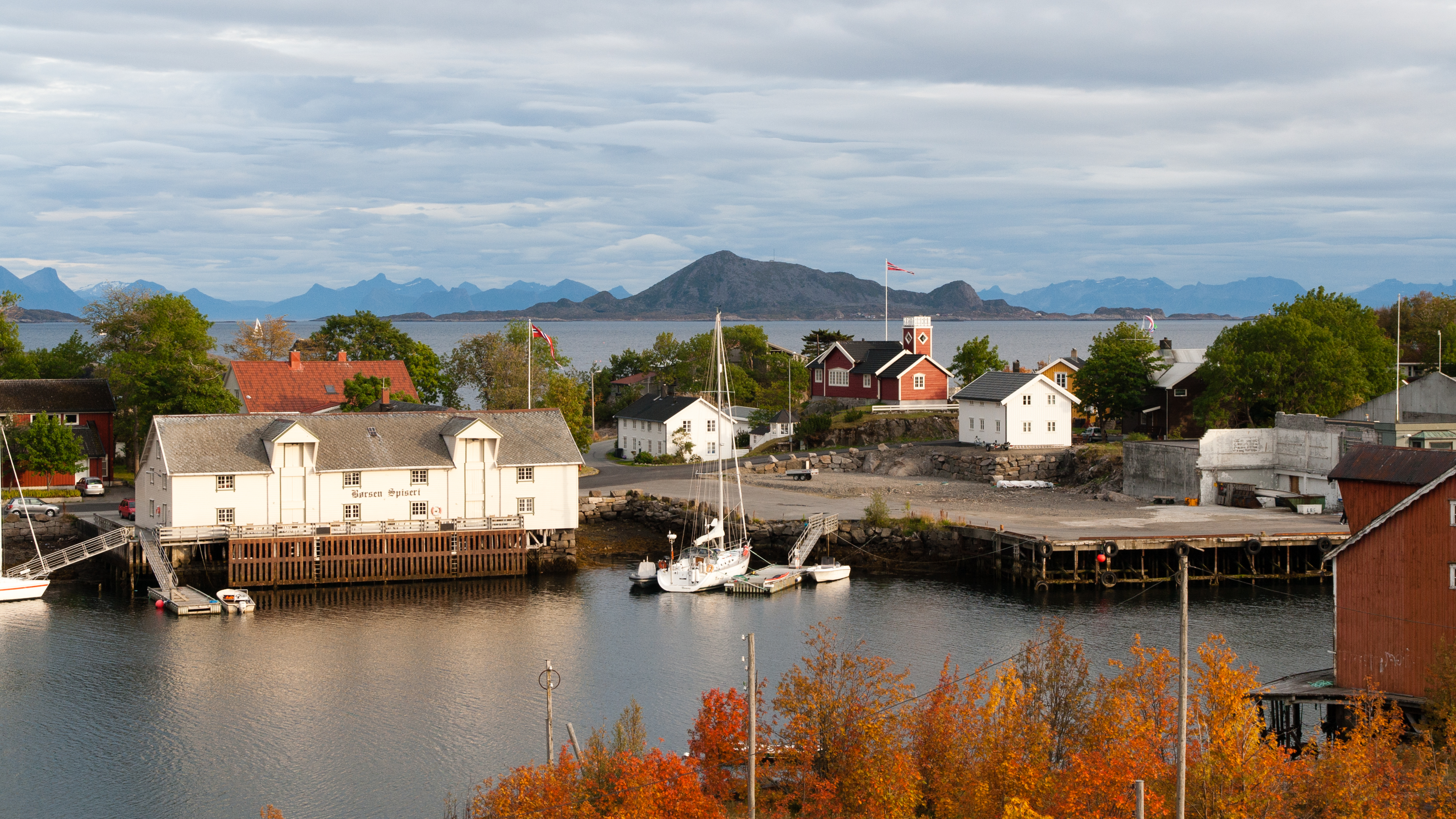
The shrinking Arctic: Parts of Norway north of the Arctic Circle has a temperate climate with the 1991–2020 normals, such as Skrova near Svolvær with mean annual temperature of 6 °C (43 °F), four months above 10°C and no month below 0 °C (32 °F).

Climate change is also predicted to have a large impact on tundra vegetation, causing an increase of shrubs, and having a negative impact on bryophytes and lichens.

Apart from concerns regarding the detrimental effects of warming in the Arctic, some potential opportunities have gained attention. The melting of the ice is making the Northwest Passage, shipping routes through the northernmost latitudes, more navigable, raising the possibility that the Arctic region will become a prime trade route. One harbinger of the opening navigability of the Arctic took place in the summer of 2016 when the Crystal Serenity successfully navigated the Northwest Passage, a first for a large cruise ship.

In addition, it is believed that the Arctic seabed may contain substantial oil fields which may become accessible if the ice covering them melts. These factors have led to recent international debates as to which nations can claim sovereignty or ownership over the waters of the Arctic.

== Arctic waters ==
- Arctic Ocean
- Baffin Bay
- Beaufort Sea
- Barents Sea
- Bering Sea
- Bering Strait
- Chukchi Sea
- Davis Strait
- Denmark Strait
- East Siberian Sea
- Greenland Sea
- Hudson Bay
- Kara Sea
- Laptev Sea
- Nares Strait
- Norwegian Sea

== Arctic lands ==
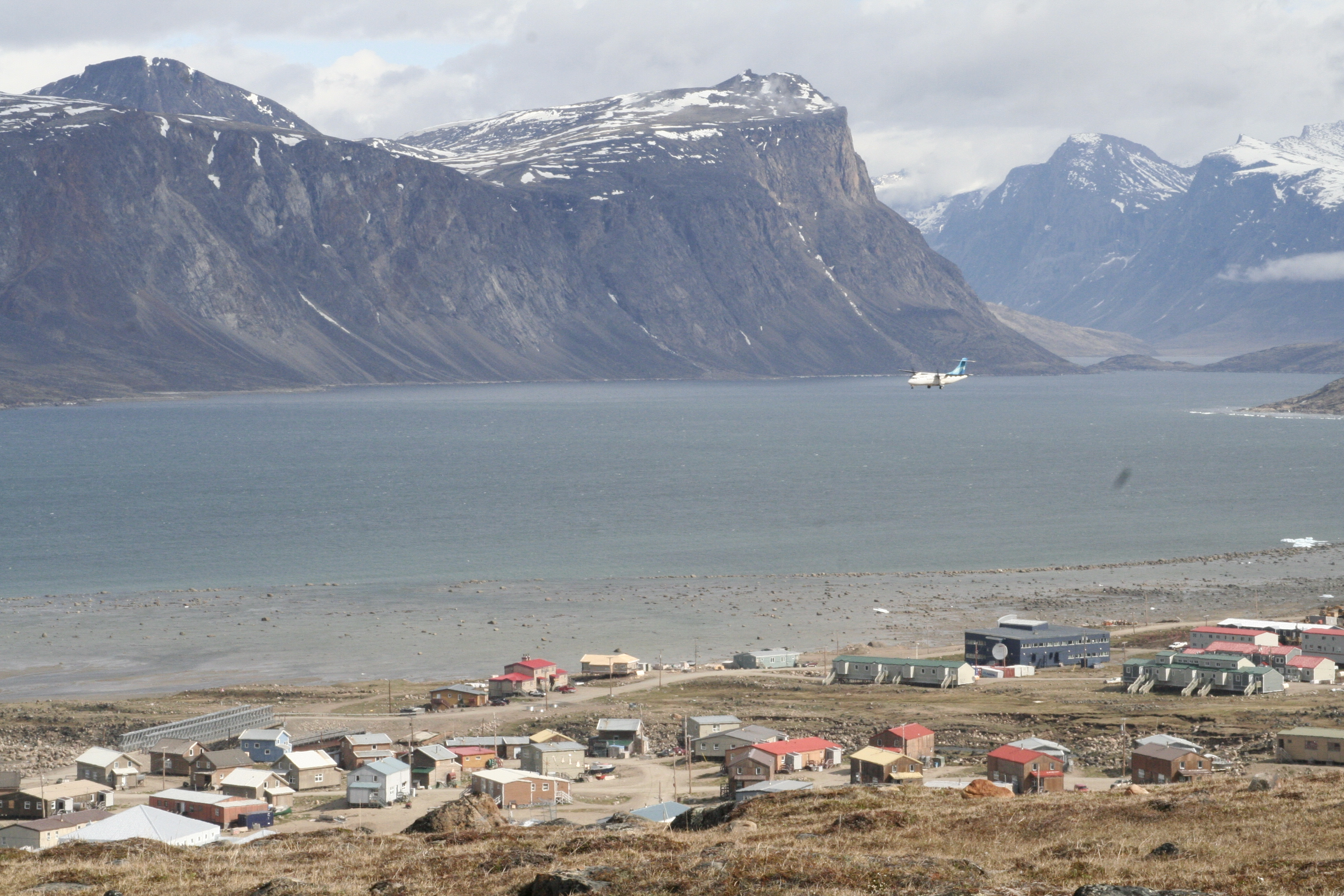
Baffin Island, Nunavut

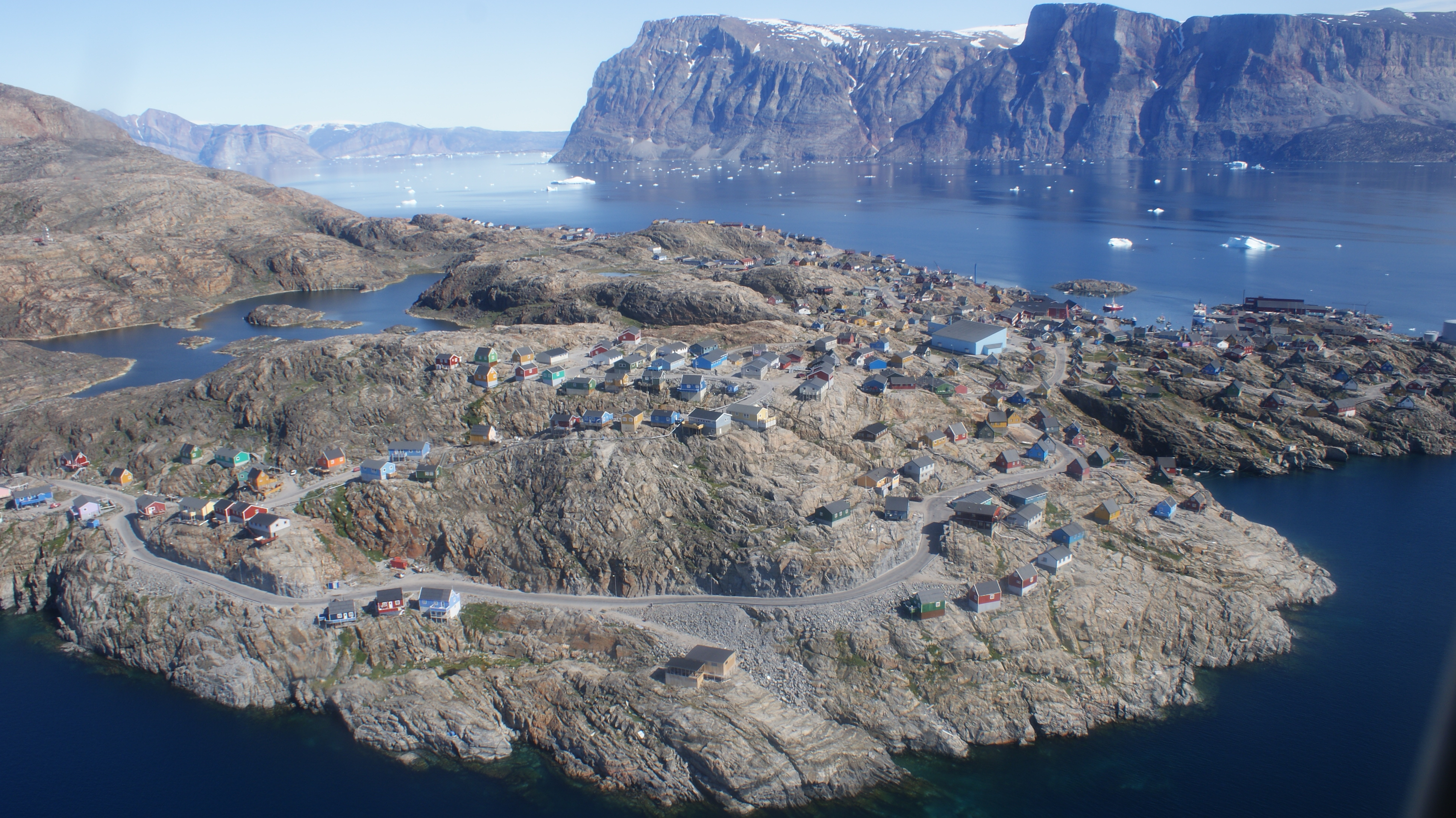
Uummannaq Island, Greenland

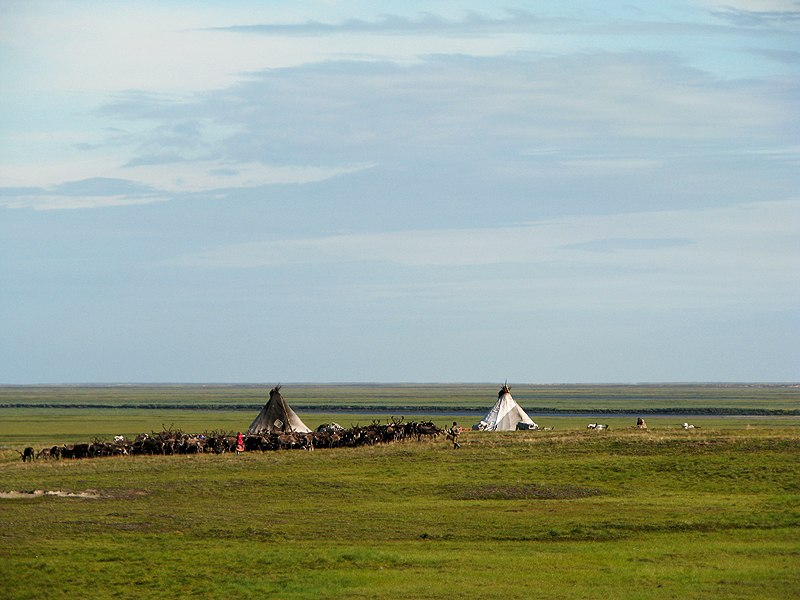
Nenets reindeer herders in the Yamalo-Nenets Autonomous Okrug

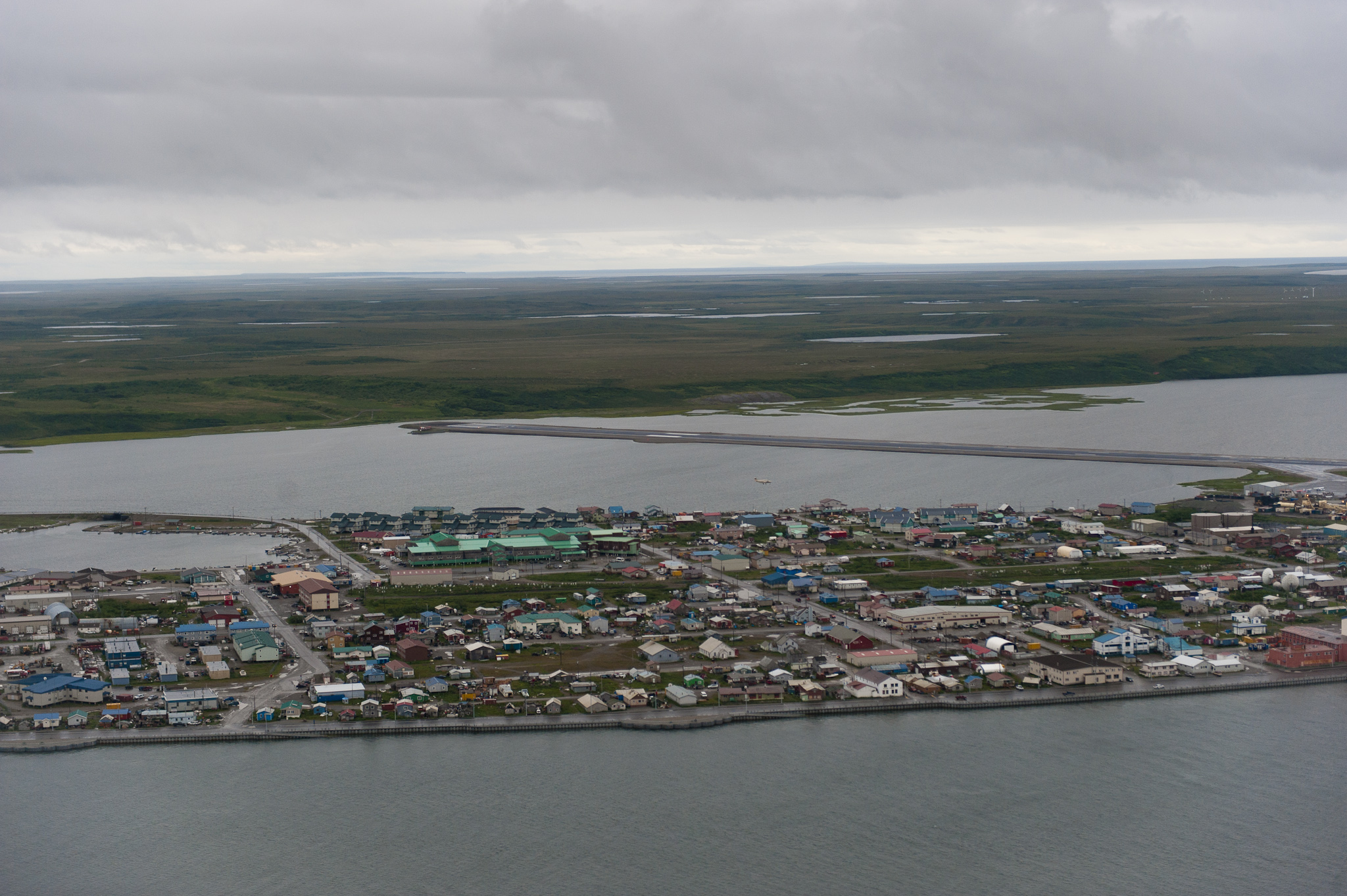
Kotzebue, Alaska

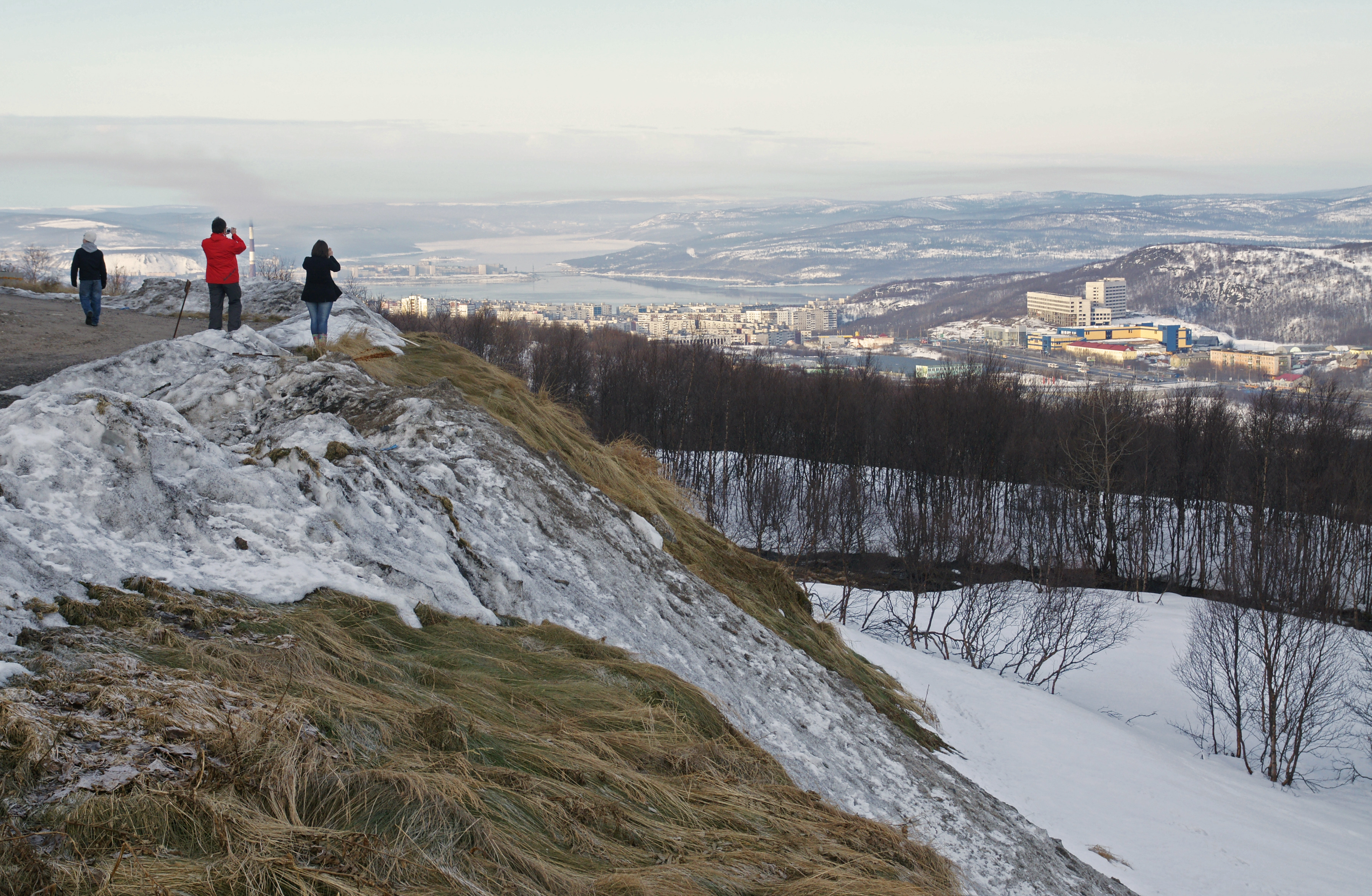
Murmansk on Russia's Kola Peninsula is the largest city in the world north of the Arctic Circle.

Geographic designation	National affiliation	Designation
Alaska	United States	State
Aleutian Islands	United States	American archipelago
Arkhangelsk Oblast	Russia	Federal subject
Arctic Archipelago	Canada	Canadian archipelago
Chukotka Autonomous Okrug	Russia	Federal subject
Diomede Island (Big)	Russia	Island
Diomede Island (Little)	United States	Island
Finnmark	Norway	Counties of Norway
Franz Josef Land	Russia	Federal subject archipelago
Greenland	Kingdom of Denmark	Autonomous country
Grímsey	Iceland	Island
Inuvik Region	Canada	Administrative region of the Northwest Territories
Jan Mayen	Norway	Island
Kainuu	Finland	Regions of Finland
Kitikmeot Region	Canada	Administrative region of Nunavut
Kivalliq Region	Canada	Administrative region of Nunavut
Kolbeinsey	Iceland	Island
Krasnoyarsk Krai	Russia	Federal subjects of Russia
Lappi	Finland	Regions of Finland
Lappland	Sweden	Provinces of Sweden
Murmansk Oblast	Russia	Federal subjects of Russia
Nenets Autonomous Okrug	Russia	Federal subjects of Russia
New Siberian Islands	Russia	Archipelago
Nordland	Norway	Counties of Norway
Norrbotten	Sweden	Provinces of Sweden
North Ostrobothnia	Finland	Regions of Finland
Northwest Territories	Canada	Territory of Canada
Novaya Zemlya	Russia	Federal subject archipelago
Nunavik	Canada	Northern part of Quebec
Nunatsiavut	Canada	Autonomous region of Labrador (Newfoundland and Labrador)
Nunavut	Canada	Territory of Canada
Qikiqtaaluk Region (Baffin)	Canada	Administrative region of Nunavut
Russian Arctic islands	Russia	Islands
Sápmi	Norway, Sweden, Finland, Russia	Fennoscandia region
Sakha Republic	Russia	Federal subject
Severnaya Zemlya	Russia	Federal subject archipelago
Siberia	Russia	Region
Svalbard	Norway	Governor of Svalbard archipelago
Troms	Norway	Counties of Norway
Västerbotten	Sweden	Provinces of Sweden
Wrangel Island	Russia	Zapovednik (nature reserve)
Yamalo-Nenets Autonomous Okrug	Russia	Federal subjects of Russia
Yukon	Canada	Territory of Canada

== See also ==
- Arctic ecology
- Arctic Search and Rescue Agreement
- Arctic sanctuary
- Poverty in the Arctic
- Arctic Winter Games
- Winter City
- Global North

== Bibliography ==
- Gibbon, Guy; Ames, Kenneth M.; Brown, James A.; Chartkoff, Joseph L.; Crown, Patricia L.; Frison, George C.; Mitchell, Donald H.; Morrison, David; Pokotylo, David L.; Wilde, James D.; Wood, W. Raymond (1998). Archaeology of Prehistoric Native America. doi:10.4324/9780203827505. ISBN 978-0-203-82750-5.
