= Philip Bourne =

Australian physical chemist and computational biologist (1953–2026)

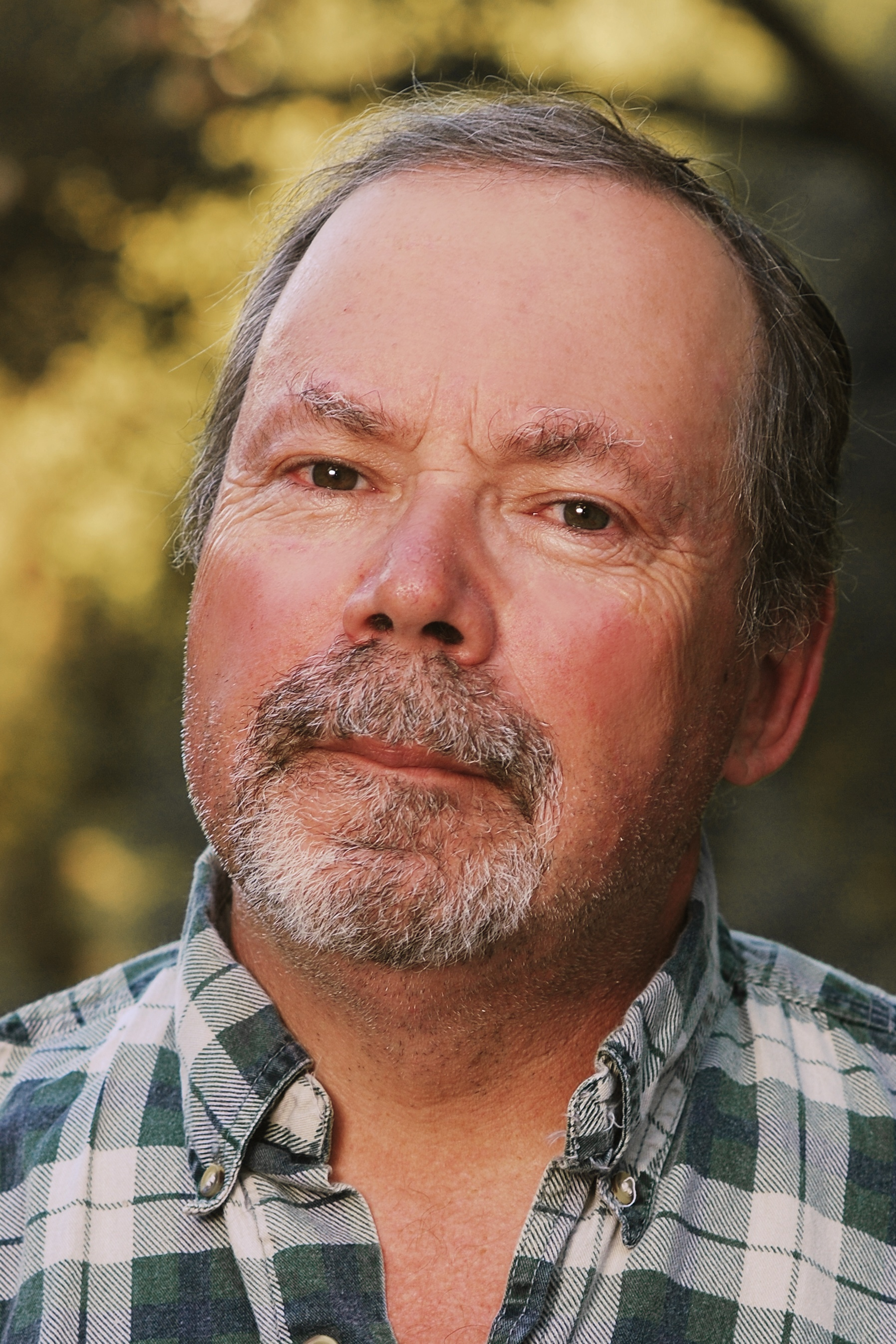
- Born: Philip Eric Bourne; 22 March 1953
- Died: 8 March 2026 (aged 72); Charlottesville, Virginia, US
- Education: Flinders University (PhD)
- Known for: Unix for VMS Users; PLOS Computational Biology; Protein Data Bank; SciVee
- Spouse: Roma Chalupa (m. 1983)
- Children: 2
- Awards: AAAS Fellow (2011); ISCB Fellow (2011); Jim Gray e-Science award (2010); Ben Franklin Award (2009)
- Scientific career
- Fields: Data science Computational biology Scholarly communication Bioinformatics
- Workplaces: University of Virginia; National Institutes of Health; University of California, San Diego; Columbia University; University of Sheffield
- Thesis: Crystal structure analyses : metal complexes of biological interest and the stereochemistry of substituted phonylbicyclooctanes (1979)
- Notable students: Werner G. Krebs
- Website: datascience.virginia.edu/people/phil-bourne

Philip Eric Bourne (22 March 1953 – 8 March 2026) was a bioinformatician, non-fiction writer and businessman. He was the Stephenson Chair of Data Science, director of the School of Data Science, Professor of Biomedical Engineering and the first associate director for data science at the National Institutes of Health, where his projects include managing the Big Data to Knowledge initiative, and formerly associate vice chancellor at UCSD. He contributed to textbooks and was a strong supporter of open-access literature and software. His diverse interests spanned structural biology, medical informatics, information technology, structural bioinformatics, scholarly communication and pharmaceutical science. His papers are highly cited with an h-index above 80. With over 100,000 citations, he was one of the University of Virginia's most cited researchers.

== Early life and education ==
Bourne was born on 22 March 1953. in London, England. His family immigrated to Australia in 1965 where had his secondary education in Adelaide. In the mid to late 1970s he obtained his PhD in physical chemistry at Flinders University in Adelaide, South Australia.

== Career and research ==
After his PhD, Bourne moved to the University of Sheffield in the UK to do postdoctoral research during 1979–1981, followed by a move to Columbia University, New York, in 1981. In 1995 he moved to University of California, San Diego, where he was a Professor in the Department of Pharmacology. In 2014, he moved to NIH to become its associate director for Data Science. In January 2017, it was announced that he had accepted a position as director of University of Virginia's Data Science Institute.

He was known for writing the book Unix for VMS Users (1990) and for being co-developer of the Combinatorial Extension algorithm for the three-dimensional alignment of protein structures, together with I. Shindyalov (1998). In 1999 he became co-director of the Protein Data Bank. He was president of the ISCB (2002–2003). He became a fellow of the American Medical Informatics Association in 2002. In 2005, he became founding Editor in Chief of PLOS Computational Biology. In 2007 he co-founded SciVee. Bourne was an editor of the popular Ten Simple Rules series of editorials published in PLOS Computational Biology journal. He served as the Associate Vice Chancellor for Innovation and Industrial Alliances and a professor of pharmacology at the Skaggs School of Pharmacy and Pharmaceutical Sciences at the University of California, San Diego (UCSD). He was an advisor to the Hypothes.is project and associate director for data science at the National Institutes of Health where his projects included managing the Big Data to Knowledge initiative.

== Personal life and death ==
Bourne married Roma Chalupa in 1983 and they had two children, Scott and Melanie. His interests included motorcycles, flying and hiking. Bourne died on 8 March 2026, at the age of 72, following a protracted battle with mesothelioma.

== Publications ==
Bourne authored numerous scientific articles and book chapters and was editor of the Structural Bioinformatics textbook. and Pharmacy Informatics. Other publications included:

- Structural Bioinformatics 1st edition
- Structural Bioinformatics 2nd edition
- Pharmacy Informatics
- Unix for Vms Users
- Bourne, Philip E. (1997-01-01). A Cookbook for Serving the Internet for UNIX. Prentice Hall. ISBN 9780135199923.
- Hart, David L.; Bourne, Philip E. (1998-08-12). Mac OS 8 Web Server Cookbook (1st ed.). Prentice Hall PTR. ISBN 9780135200162.
- Bourne, Philip E. (2000-01-01). Underground Guide Unix. Prentice Hall. ISBN 9780131844582.
- Berman, H. M.; Westbrook, J.; Feng, Z.; Gilliland, G.; Bhat, T. N.; Weissig, H.; Shindyalov, I. N.; Bourne, P. E. (2000-01-01). "The Protein Data Bank". Nucleic Acids Research. 28 (1): 235–242. doi:10.1093/nar/28.1.235. ISSN 0305-1048. PMC 102472. PMID 10592235.

== Awards and honours ==
Bourne was elected a Fellow of the AAAS under Pharmaceutical Sciences in 2011 and a fellow of the International Society for Computational Biology (ISCB) in 2011. In 2010 he won Microsoft's Jim Gray e-Science award and in 2009 won that year's Benjamin Franklin Award.

Preceded by Russ Altman	President of the International Society for Computational Biology; 2002–2003	Succeeded by Michael Gribskov
