= Philip Loring =

Researcher

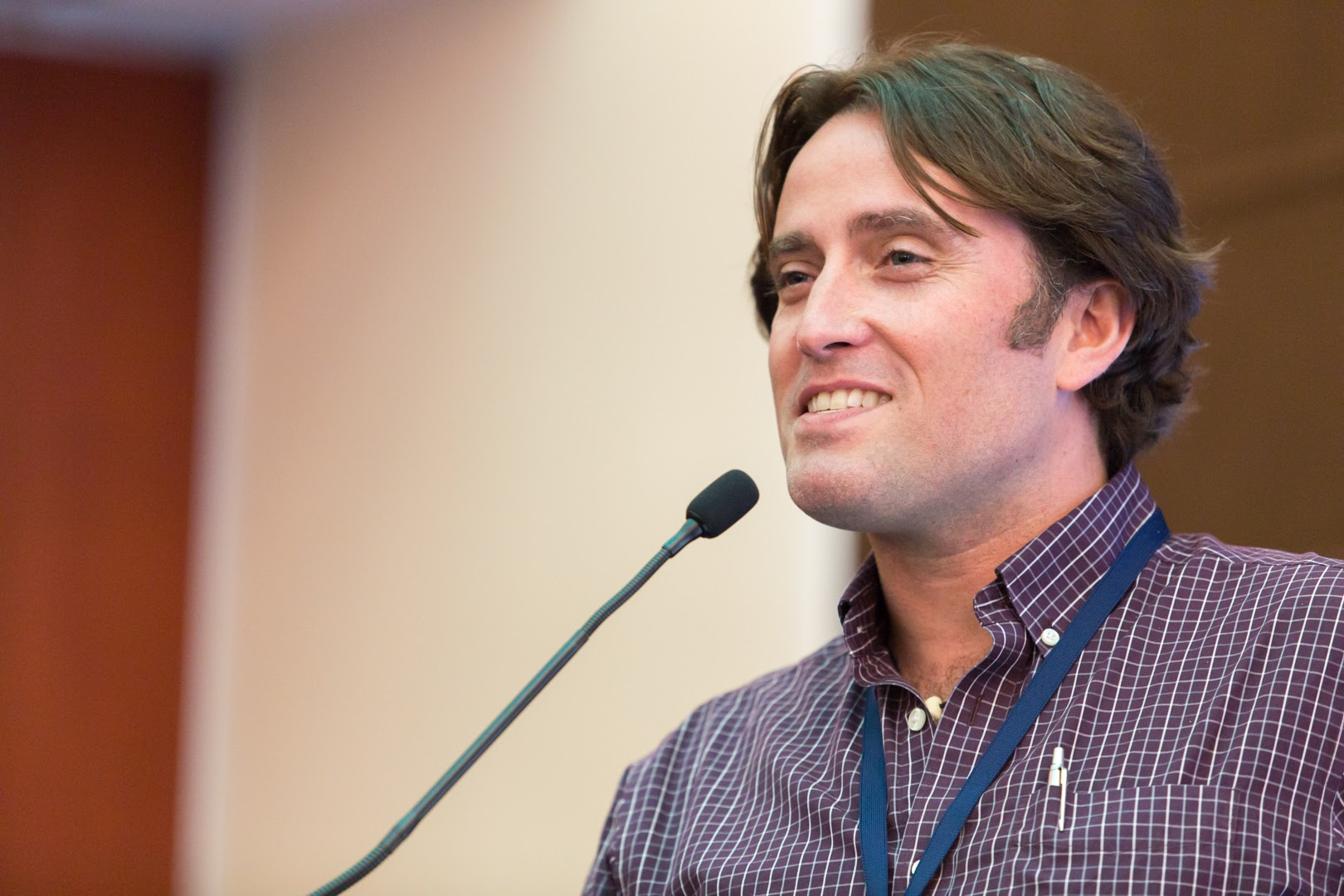
- Born: Philip Allen Loring; April 29, 1977 (age 49); Salem, Massachusetts
- Title: Global Director, Human Dimensions Science

Academic background
- Education: PhD, University of Alaska Fairbanks
- Thesis: Ways To Help And Ways To Hinder: Climate, Health, And Food Security In Alaska (2010)

Academic work
- Discipline: Human ecologist
- Sub-discipline: Specialist in regenerative ecology, food security and food systems, and environmental justice
- Institutions: Arrell Food Institute, University of Guelph
- Notable works: Finding Our Niche: Toward a Restorative Human Ecology (2020)
- Website: www.conservationofchange.org

Philip Allen Loring (born April 29, 1977) is a human ecologist and author. Loring is the Global Director of Human Dimensions Science at The Nature Conservancy. He is known for his work on Arctic food security, natural resource conflict, and regenerative food systems. Loring wrote Finding Our Niche: Toward a Restorative Human Ecology (2020), and hosts several academic podcasts.

== Education ==
Loring was born in Salem, Massachusetts and grew up in coastal Maine. He received a master's degree in anthropology and a PhD in Indigenous studies from the University of Alaska Fairbanks. He started his professional career in information technology before changing careers and receiving a master's degree in anthropology and a PhD in Indigenous studies from the University of Alaska Fairbanks. Both of his theses focused on the implications of climate change and natural resource policy on food security for Indigenous peoples in Alaska.

== Research career ==
After receiving his PhD, Loring was a research scientist at the University of Alaska Fairbanks for three years. From 2013-2018, he was an assistant professor at the University of Saskatchewan’s School of Environment and Sustainability, where among other responsibilities he served as the 2017 President of the Arctic Division of the American Association for the Advancement of Science. From 2018-2023 he held the Arrell Chair in Food, Policy and Society, a research chair funded by the Arrell Family Foundation at University of Guelph.

As a Global Director on The Nature Conservancy's Global Science Team, he "ensures that TNC’s science and practice incorporates attention to social and cultural dimensions of environmental problems and elevates local voices in the development and implementation of solutions."

Loring's research in the Arctic explored Indigenous food security, fisheries, and the impacts of climate change. Loring has also done research on conflict over natural resources in settings such as Alaska and the Canadian prairies. As a part of this research, he co-produced and co-directed of the short documentary Wetland / Wasteland, which won an honorable mention at the 2020 Let’s Talk About Water film festival.

During the COVID-19 pandemic, Loring pivoted his research to explore how COVID-19 affected fisheries and farmers in the United States, Canada and Africa.

In 2020, he published Finding Our Niche: Toward a Restorative Human Ecology. The book explores regenerative, sustainable and socially just food systems through various case studies, including cattle ranching in The Burren, Ireland, and Indigenous clam gardening in British Columbia. It received a Silver medal in the Ecology & Environment category of the Nautilus Book Awards and a Gold Medal in the Regional Non-fiction category of the Independent Publisher Book Awards.

=== Podcasting ===
In May 2020, he launched the Social FISHtancing podcast with Hannah Harrison and Emily De Sousa, which was nominated for a Canadian Podcast Award and a science communication award from the Social Science and Humanities Research Council. Loring and Harrison also coined the term "pubcast" to refer to audio recordings of published research articles.

== Personal life ==
Loring lives in Grass Valley, California, with his wife and daughter.

== Selected works ==
=== Books ===
- Finding Our Niche: Toward a Restorative Human Ecology. Fernwood Publishing. 2020.
- "Community-Led Initiatives as Innovative Responses" in Food Security in the High North. Routledge. 2022.
- "Indigenous food sovereignty and tourism: the Chakra Route in the Amazon region of Ecuador" in Justice and Tourism Principles and Approaches for Local-Global Sustainability and Well-Being. Routledge. 2021.
- "Fish as food: policies affecting food sovereignty for rural Indigenous communities in North America" The Routledge Handbook of Comparative Rural Policy. Routledge. 2019.

=== Articles ===
- With Palash Sanyal. "Indicators of Complexity and Over-Complexification in Global Food Systems." Frontiers in Sustainable Food Systems. 2021.
- “Regenerative Food Systems and the Conservation of Change.” Agriculture and Human Values. 2021.
- With Henry P. Huntington, Jennifer I. Schmidt, Erin Whitney, Srijan Aggarwal, Amanda G. Byrd, Subhabrata Dev, Aaron D. Dotson, Daisy Huang, and Barbara Johnson. "Applying the Food–Energy–Water Nexus Concept at the Local Scale." Nature Sustainability. 2021.
- With Helen Baulch, Colin Whitfield, Jared Wolfe, Nandita Basu, Angela Bedard-Haughn, Kenneth Belcher, and Robert Clark. "Synthesis of Science: Findings on Canadian Prairie Wetland Drainage". Canadian Water Resources Journal. 2021.
- With Joshua S. Stoll, Hannah L. Harrison, Emily De Sousa, Debra Callaway, Melissa Collier, Kelly Harrell, and Buck Jones. "Alternative Seafood Networks during COVID-19: Implications for Resilience and Sustainability." EcoEvoRxiv. 2020.
- "Threshold Concepts and Sustainability: Features of a Contested Paradigm." FACETS. 2020.
- With Harrison. "Seeing beneath Disputes: A Transdisciplinary Framework for Diagnosing Complex Conservation Conflicts." Biological Conservation. 2020.
- With Huntington, Glenna Gannon, Shari Fox Gearheard, S. Craig Gerlach, and Lawrence C. Hamilton. "Staying in Place during Times of Change in Arctic Alaska: The Implications of Attachment, Alternatives, and Buffering." Regional Environmental Change. 2017.
- With Megan S. Hinzman, and Hanna Neufeld. “Can People Be Sentinels of Sustainability? Identifying the Linkages among Ecosystem Health and Human Well-Being.” FACETS. 2016.
- With Hamilton, Kei Saito, Richard B. Lammers, and Huntington. “Climigration? Population and Climate Change in Arctic Alaska.” Population and Environment. 2016.
- "Toward a Theory of Coexistence in Shared Social-Ecological Systems: The Case of Cook Inlet Salmon Fisheries." Human Ecology. 2016.
- "The Political Ecology of Gear Bans in Two Fisheries: Florida’s Net Ban and Alaska’s Salmon Wars." Fish and Fisheries. 2016.
- Gerlach, David E. Atkinson, and Maribeth S. Murray. "Ways to Help and Ways to Hinder: Governance for Successful Livelihoods in a Changing Climate." Arctic. 2011.
- With M. Aaron MacNeil, Nicholas A. J. Graham, Joshua E. Cinner, Nicholas K. Dulvy, Simon Jennings, Nicholas V. C. Polunin, Aaron T. Fisk, and Tim R. McClanahan. "Transitional States in Marine Fisheries: Adapting to Predicted Global Change." Philosophical Transactions of the Royal Society B: Biological Sciences. 2010.
- With Gerlach. "Food, Culture, and Human Health in Alaska: An Integrative Health Approach to Food Security." Environmental Science and Policy. 2009.
