= Big Data to Knowledge =

British National Institutes of Health project

Big Data to Knowledge (BD2K) is a project of the National Institutes of Health for knowledge extraction from big data.

BD2K was founded in 2013 in response to a report from the Working Group on Data and Informatics for the Advisory Committee to the Director of the National Institutes of Health.

A significant part of BD2K's plans is to have organizations make plans to share their research data when they make a proposal in response to a funding opportunity announcement.

Philip Bourne was the lead in managing the project until early 2017.
