= Pubcast =

A PubCast is an audiobook-style, abridged and annotated reading of a research article, usually recorded by the author. Several academic journals have shown support for PubCasts, linking directly to them below the abstracts of published articles, including Facets, Fisheries Research, and People and Nature.

== Variation ==
The term pubcast could be used to denote an online presentation that includes the combination of video with a published research article. This is accomplished by using an in-browser application software that enables the ability to select particular portions of the published article to be displayed at particular points in a video timeline. The result is a synchronized presentation posted online.

The term pubcast could be used as a colloquialism to describe a video conference session in an unlikely place, such as a pub. The session is intended to include a remote participant in a social event.

The term Pubcast could be used to describe a Podcast that is primarily or entirely recorded in a pub.

== History ==
The term as described above was coined by Dr. Hannah L. Harrison and Dr. Philip Loring of the University of Guelph with the release of their first PubCast in 2019 as a product of the Coastal Routes Network.

The term is believed to have been used prior by Phil Bourne, co-founder of SciVee, a web 2.0 a science video sharing website in early 2007.

Christophe Delire is conceiver of the PostModemArt WebOpera. https://www.youtube.com/watch?v=j-303q0ttFE (postmodemart) and https://www.youtube.com/watch?v=XY5bwete0i8 (webopera) Christophe uses pubcast.be since 2007 to make realtime exhibitions where information is played "live" and dynamically on a vertical time line (like a blog).
