= Pollution in the Arctic Ocean =

Pollution in the Arctic Ocean is primarily the result of economic activities carried out on land, which is sources from locally, regionally, and globally origins. There is also the inclusion of industrial development in the Arctic region, northern rivers, and the effects of military activities, particularly nuclear activity – as well as the influx of pollutants from other regions of the world.However, the Arctic Ocean remains relatively clean compared to other marine regions of the world.

Common contaminants found in the Arctic region can include heavy metals and persistent organic pollutants (POPs) which subsequently accumulate in the food chain. These contaminants come from wastewater as well as long-range pollution both based in the atmosphere and from oceanic movement. Commercial fisheries as well as chemical and waste emissions from resource exploitation including mining, minerals, oil and gas extraction are among the many pollutants. Moreover, there are approximately 8.3 billion metric tons of plastic in the Arctic ocean ( dated 2017 ) and an expected 34 billion metric tons in 2050.

Economic activity in the Arctic seas is not the only source of pollution. The growing presence of military weapons systems in the region raises concerns of increased pollution. Management of specific risks of marine pollution in the Arctic is governed primarily by national legislation in coastal states, although these take existing international standards into account. Bilateral agreements exist between Arctic states on cooperation in the prevention of marine pollution in the Arctic seas and immediate responses in case of oil spills. Nevertheless, there is no legal framework relating to weapons and other military presence.

The first steps in this direction have already been made. After signing the 2010 Treaty on Maritime Delimitation of the continental shelf in the Barents Sea and the Arctic Ocean, Russia and Norway began bilateral consultations on the harmonization of national environmental standards used for the exploration and development of the mineral resources of the shelf. The parties came to an agreement to make a comparative analysis of national legislation and to identify differences concerning measures for preventing the pollution of the environment.

A recent report published by the International Council on Clean Transportation (ICCT) suggested that the reduction of the polar ice caps and the projected increase in shipping activity in the region could have a severe impact on the levels of pollution experienced across the entire Arctic region but notes that a shift to cleaner sulphur-based fuel could resolve the issue.while keeping it in mind we should take steps to reduce the Arctic pollution to save the water and the species under the water.

== Economic activities ==
Russia operates a fleet of nuclear-powered icebreakers to open up shipping lanes in the Arctic Ocean year round. The operation of these vessels is contributing to radioactive contamination of the Arctic environment.

The Yamal Megaproject, a natural gas project developed by the Russian oil and gas company, Gazprom, is a development designed to exploit the largest gas reserves on Earth. Gas spills and climate change effect the indigenous Nentsy population, as the permafrost and water supplies are contaminated.

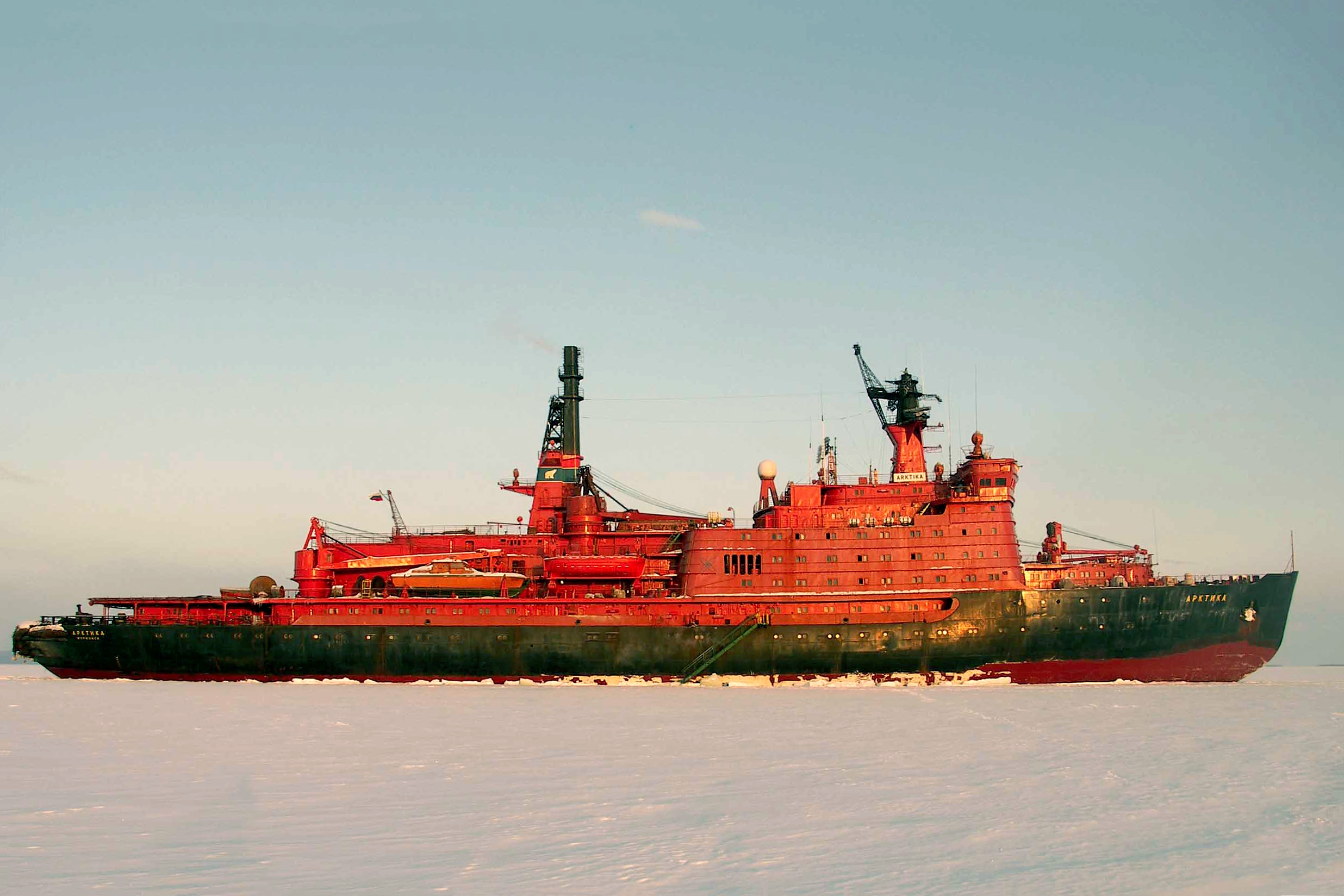
Russian Nuclear Icebreakers are operated year round in order to open shipping lanes for merchant vessels.

== Military activities and their effects ==
Military activities in the Arctic Ocean have increased substantially. The United States Navy performs an exercise called ICEX where the US Navy practices arctic operations. However, the US military is not the only force that has increased activity in the Arctic Ocean. For example, Russia has recently launched a fleet of ships that are used to transports various cargo, such as cargo and minerals. In order to conduct this transport, these ships, known as ice breakers, are specially designed to break through the beds of ice that fill the Arctic Ocean. Part of the increase in military activity in the arctic stems from the Cold War, in which the US and USSR have made a practice of engaging in trade wars that seep into the modern day. While from a national security and economic perspective, these countries may feel justified in their campaigns, their increased activity has highly disturbed the original environment that once existed. The activity of ice breakers continues to amplify the effects of climate change. As ice serves as a buffer for heat, its breaking results in temperatures reaching extreme heat and cold. In the past, these temperatures were within a much smaller range. Furthermore, icebreakers have caused unprecedented rises in sea level, manifesting in the "erosion of beaches" and "indentation of deltas." Finally, as ice breakers produce large amounts of sound pollution, this interferes with the sonic communication patterns of sea mammals such as whales and others. While every country's military has a need for efficient cargo transport, the environmental effects of their methods are undeniable.

== Initiatives ==
In 1996, the Arctic Council was founded to combat conflict and promote cooperation amongst the Arctic States, which encompasses the indigenous peoples and other inhabitants. Their initiative encourages sustainable development and protection against pollution. Furthermore, in 2018, an initiative was launched by the Washington D.C. organization Ocean Conservancy launched a petition for major U.S. firms to stop using arctic trade shipping routes to transport their goods. Nike even joined them in their initiative, pledging not to use arctic trade routes themselves, and helping Ocean Conservancy with the PR aspects of their campaign. Other major firms that followed Nike in their pledge to not use arctic trade routes include Gap, H&M, Columbia, and Kering Group. Ocean Conservancy has also collaborated with the UN in order to help launch this initiative on a more global scale.

== See also ==
- Global distillation
