= SciVee =

SciVee, Inc.
- Company type: Subsidiary
- Website type: hosting science video combined with documents and images
- Website: SciVee
- Registration: Optional(required to upload, synchronize, rate and to comment on videos)
- Launched: December 3, 2007
- Current status: Down

SciVee was a science video sharing website where researchers could upload, view and share science video clips and connect them to scientific literature, posters and slides from 2007 to 2015. The SciVee website is partnered with three groups: The Public Library of Science (PLoS), a publisher of a series of open access (OA) journals who have added content to the website, the National Science Foundation (NSF), who provided seed funding to start the website, and the San Diego Supercomputer Center (SDSC), who houses SciVee's video servers and data for the website. The University of California, San Diego–based service uses Adobe Flash technology to display video combined with documents and imagery via SciVee's patent pending rich web applications or "virtual studio" WYSIWYG to combine, or "synchronize" them with a published scientific article from a scientific journal or poster from a scientific conference poster session. Any video synchronized with a published scientific article is called a "pubcast," while a video that is synchronized with a scientific conference session poster is called a "postercast." Science videos that are not synchronized with a scientific article or poster can be uploaded and linked with supplementary files.

Research scientists are the primary audience for the website, but students of all levels, educators and the general public also use the site. Video content ranges from dense and highly technical explanations of scientific publications to elementary school level science. Unregistered users can watch the videos and use the provided embed code to vlog to videos into external websites, while registered users are permitted to upload an unlimited number of videos, synchronize scientific documents, add commentary to the site, create public profiles, and join or create communities. Registration is free and provides access to a full social networking service that allows registered members to interact with other members through private messaging, blogging, and open community discussions.

== History ==
With seed funding from NSF, two professors from the University of California, Phil Bourne and Leo Chalupa, founded the website. In early 2007, Phil and Leo put together a small team of people to create the Web 2.0 website allowing participation membership to a social science network with video and article upload. SciVee was named by combining the words "science" and "video". After initial development, the website began accepting its first video uploads August 1, 2007. Nineteen days after going online in a pre-alpha test state, Slashdot dubbed SciVee the "YouTube for Science." The official alpha site launch took place September 1, 2007. Based on the feedback received from the initial boom of new members from being Slashdotted, the SciVee team made updates to the website to accommodate customer demands and launched its beta release December 3, 2007. That day, CNN and USA Today featured articles about a video created by four UC San Diego science and film students showing "a typical recrystallization experiment straight out of Chemistry 101." Since then, SciVee has added more features to the site including discussions, blogging, extended profiles and other community options. On August 26, 2008, SciVee launched a new postercast capability. The same day, Paul Glazowski at Mashable referred to the release as "a new option for users to upload feature material in the form of "postercasts" that enable users to complement their traditional video presentations with an interactive documentation component. The synchronous delivery of these is remarkably user-friendly.". The site abruptly disappeared around the end of 2015.

== Beliefs and objectives ==
Philip Bourne stated in his article in CTWatch Quarterly, Volume 3, Number 3, August 2007:

"We believe that the research community is ripe for a revolution in scientific communication and that the current generation of scientists will be the one to push it forward. These scientists, generally graduate students and new post-docs, have grown up with cyberinfrastructure as a part of their daily lives, not just a specialized aspect of their profession. They have a natural ability to do science in an electronic environment without the need for printed publications or static documents and, in fact, can feel quite limited by the traditional format of a publication. Perhaps most importantly, they appreciate that the sheer amount of data and the number of publications is prohibitive to the traditional methods of keeping current with the literature....To this end, we have developed SciVee, which allows authors to upload an article they have already published (open access, naturally) with a video or podcast presentation (about 10 minutes long) that they have made that describes the highlights of the paper. The author can then synchronize the video with the content of the article (text, figures, etc.) such that the relevant parts of the article appear as the author discusses them during the video presentation. We call the result a pubcast."

Lynn Fink, SciVee's scientific developer, stated in her article submitted to FEST, the International Science Media Fair in Trieste:

"Keeping current with the literature is a crucial part of doing science. It is, however, getting increasingly more difficult due to the growing number of articles that are published. SciVee aims to make this task easier and faster by delivering the key points of articles in an accessible and enjoyable medium – the pubcast: a short video of the author speaking about their published paper while the text of their paper is displayed next to the video. Prior to the open access movement, the creation of pubcasts would have been prohibitively difficult and readers would be forced to face a growing stack of articles to read. Fortunately, with pubcasts, readers can interact with several articles in the time it would take to read a single full article in the traditional way... We believe that the emergence of open access literature is the spur that will drive innovation in scientific communication. In contrast to closed access literature, where publishers require a subscription to access content, articles that are published as open access are available for immediate viewing, download, and distribution. Furthermore, the author retains the copyright, rather than the publisher, under a Creative Commons license (usually CCAL 2.5 or 3.0) which grants the author much more freedom in the use of their own work. This license also grants considerable freedom to a consumer of this article. Specifically, the CCAL licenses under which most open access articles are published allow a consumer to "make and distribute derivative works, in any digital medium". SciVee takes full advantage of this by integrating the full text of the articles with web-based video... The traditional article format no longer effectively supports the research in the current age. We believe that taking advantage of open access articles in this way will have a significant impact on the scientific community. SciVee modernizes scientific publishing and communication by taking advantage of the possibilities the information age has to offer, namely widespread use of cyberinfrastructure. SciVee makes the process of creating and consuming scientific literature more enjoyable and accessible. We hope that scientific community will embrace these efforts and help make scientific communication." more effective.

== Further Associated References ==
- Bourne, P. (2005). "Will a Biological Database Be Different from a Biological Journal?". PLOS Computational Biology. 1 (3): 179–181. Bibcode:2005PLSCB...1...34B. doi:10.1371/journal.pcbi.0010034. PMC 1193993. PMID 16158097.
- Bourne, P. E.; Fink, J. L.; Gerstein, M. (2008). "Open Access: Taking Full Advantage of the Content". PLOS Computational Biology. 4 (3) e1000037. Bibcode:2008PLSCB...4E0037B. doi:10.1371/journal.pcbi.1000037. PMC 2275780. PMID 18369428.
