= Poverty in the Arctic =

The Arctic is a vast polar region comprising the northernmost parts of Canada, Norway, Greenland (Denmark), Sweden, Finland, the United States (Alaska), Iceland and Russia. In recent years, the Arctic has been at the forefront of political and social issues. Several matters have risen surrounding the issues of poverty and global warming and their effects on indigenous people in this region. Indigenous people in the Arctic statistically fall below their nation's poverty line.

Indigenous populations that were once largely self-sufficient and relatively food secure in the Arctic's harsh environment are today struggling to sustain themselves as a result of poverty and also the impacts of climate change. Currently, they are facing an overwhelming number of issues in relation to poverty including cultural loss, high rates of chronic illness and chronic disease, mental health disorders, lack of basic health needs and housing shortages. In Canada's arctic region, for example, infant mortality rate is 3.5 times higher than the national rate while life expectancy is 12 years lower. In Greenland, life expectancy is 70 years for women and 65 years for men whereas in Denmark life expectancy for women is 80.59 and 75.8 for men. Specifically, in the territory of Nunavut, unemployment rates range from 15 to 72 per cent. In 2010, 9.9 per cent of Alaskan households fell below their respective poverty thresholds.

== Indigenous people ==
Indigenous populations have occupied Arctic regions for thousands of years and have built their distinct customs and cultural norms around the Arctic's harsh environmental factors. Indigenous people are the most dominant group of people living in the Arctic. The Arctic territory is home to multiple major indigenous groups; Inuit, Kalaallit (Greenlandic Inuit), Alaska natives: Aleut, Alutiiq, Alaskan Athabaskans, Iñupiat and Yupik peoples, Russian-Siberian natives: Nenets, Evenks, Khanty, Evens and the Sámi. The Inuit are the most populous of these groups and number roughly 50,000 to 60,000 in size.

For long Inuit populations remained isolated from the outside world and thrived as independent communities. The arrival of Europeans explorers in the early 16th century however brought turmoil and disorder to the Inuit way of life. The introduction of new diseases from whalers and explorers in addition to social unjust caused widespread death and disruption across Inuit populations in the Arctic. Following European contact, colonialism became problematic in the Inuit society, as it grew as a result of fur trading operations in the region. Issues surrounding resources and land ownership arose across indigenous populations, as Europeans and the Inuit competed for valuable resources. Colonialism and imperialism destroyed the social structure of many indigenous groups in the Arctic. In consequence, many of these groups still continue to live in some of the most marginalized communities in the developed world today.

Social, economic and demographic characteristics of indigenous populations in the Arctic are homogenous to those in developing nations. Poverty in the region has created challenges in indigenous communities in the form of lack of basic health care, low academic achievement, poor and crowded housing, concerns with water quality and high unemployment rates.

== Climate change ==
In recent decades the Arctic has obtained a significant amount of attention due to the effects climate change has on the arctic. The Arctic is facing numerous problems as a result of rising global temperatures, placing constraints on an already susceptible society. Polar regions are particularly vulnerable to the effects of climate change and combined with the effects of poverty, create unrest across indigenous populations in the Arctic.

The effects of climate change are disproportionate in the world's polar regions; temperatures are increasing twice as rapidly as the global average, and in the past few years there has been an extraordinary decrease in the amount of summer sea-ice cover. Fishing practices have been compromised as a result and the abundance and distribution of wild game for hunting has also begun to change. Severe weather events are becoming stronger and more frequent. These changes are dangerous to indigenous populations because it prevents them from performing cultural moralities, such as fishing and hunting. Inuit populations in the Arctic are heavily dependent on the environment for their well-being but the onset of climate change has placed their environment at risk making them highly prone to the effects of climate change.

Climate change has contributed to food insecurity, poor health and disease, serious injury and the inability to practice traditional cultural activities.

The reduction in permafrost, rising sea levels and coastal erosion is threatening the livelihood of indigenous settlements in the Arctic, compromising important heritage sites and impairing municipal infrastructure and water supply. The lack of income in many societies is preventing restructuring of infrastructure and families are being forced to live in marginalized buildings.

== Food insecurity ==
Food insecurity happens when strains are placed on food systems, making food inaccessible, unavailable and/or insufficient quality. In the Arctic, food insecurity is induced by food quality, availability, and access; absence of a full-time hunter in the household; food knowledge; education and preferences; cost of harvesting; addiction; food affordability and budgeting; and finally, poverty. Food insecurity in the Arctic has been intensified by socioeconomic stresses, climate change, and policies for land tenure and fish and game management that limit indigenous people's ability to be flexible and adapt to change. In Canada, Nunavut reported the highest rates of food insecurity; 56 per cent of the Inuit population is classed as food-insecure compared to the 14.7 per cent, which represents the Canadian average.

The Inuit culture, as with the other various indigenous peoples in the region, is heavily dependent on hunting and fishing for country food, and makes up the majority of their food supply. In 2008/2009, Inuit women have reported an 85 per cent shortage in country food supplies and have been unable to produce food for their families. Inuit women are the most at risk for food insecurity because they first and foremost need to provide for their families. In total 76 per cent of Inuit women reported skipping meals and cutting the size of their meals to allow other family members to eat first. Women are typically last to eat in the household in order for children to eat first and eat an adequate amount. Some women have also reported letting men eat more, while they eat even less due to the energy men need to hunt for their food.

Poverty is described as one of the most influential barriers to food security. The disparity of Inuit settlements, high rates of unemployment and acculturative stresses have been significant contributing factors to food insecurity in the Arctic. As a result, food prices are increasing, while the availability and quality of food is decreasing. Inuit women lack basic knowledge of store food, affecting suitable choices they will make in order properly nourish their families. This lack of knowledge constrains a women's ability to properly substitute store food with country food during times when country food is low and thus the family does not receive the adequate nourishment it requires. The high cost of hunting has also been a contributing factor to the shortage of food in the Arctic, placing a strain on country food availability.

== See also ==
- Arctic cooperation and politics
- Inuit Circumpolar Council
