= Arctic Strategy and Environmental Governance =

Arctic strategy and Environmental Governance was not of global concern when environmental politics began to emerge in the 1960s.

The Arctic Region

It was Mikhail Gorbachev’s Murmansk speech in 1987, towards the end of the Cold War, that sowed the basis for a co-management of the Arctic. It also introduced a focus for the first time on environmental cooperation. This, in turn, inspired the 1991 Arctic Environmental Protection Strategy and the 1996 Arctic Council.

Principal Arctic states’ engagement in the Arctic has been on the rise since the turn of the 21st century. This led to the publication of a multitude of reports and policy strategies aimed at both defending the principal state's interests in the region and seeking collaboration from other nations to address the growing environmental threat. It represents the dichotomy opened by climate change between consequential natural dangers and the rise of new geopolitical and economic opportunities.

== Historical background ==
The Arctic region has long been considered a remote area of the world as it is largely inaccessible due to its extreme environmental conditions. Hence, it has been excluded from states’ geopolitical race until the end of the 20th century. Now, it is indisputable that this region is one of the most affected by climate change. However, it was not of primary concern when environmental politics arose in the 60s.

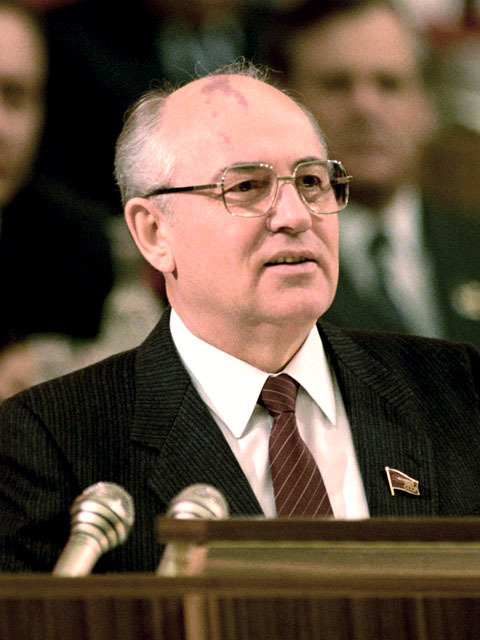
RIAN archive 850809 General Secretary of the CPSU CC M. Gorbachev

Environmental cooperation in the Arctic was first mentioned by Mikhail Gorbachev in his famous Murmansk speech in October 1987. During this Murmansk initiative, the Secretary-General of the Soviet Communist Party urged the other states to end the Cold War tensions in the area and transform the Arctic into a region of peace and co-management, with a distinctive focus on environmental preservation

This could be considered the inspiration for the 1991 Arctic Environmental protection Strategy and, consequently, the 1996 Arctic Council.

Another fundamental turning point was when the Russian national flag was placed by a Russian robot on the North Pole for the first time in 2007, during the Arktika expedition. This symbolic event proved to spur global interest in Arctic geopolitics.

During this time, Canada, Denmark and Norway were also claiming extra territories in the region, and the famous American Survey of Undiscovered Oil and Gas in the Arctic was published. According to the survey, 22% of the world's undiscovered fossil fuels (30% gas, 13% oil) are lying in the. Most of the energy is underwater, beyond any Exclusive Economic Zone, hence under no control.

These contemporary events increased states’ concern and interest for a new era of domination, as well as cooperation in the Arctic. Thus, in the first years of the 21st century, Arctic states proceeded to publish strategy documents and directives to protect their interests.

Regarding the environmental concern, the three pivotal documents that made states commit to measures for an “adequate adaptation to climate change” are: the 1992 UN Framework Convention on Climate Change, the 1997 Kyoto Protocol and, the 2007 Bali Action Plan.

== Environmental situation and climate change ==
The Arctic ice sheets are melting more rapidly than any other area in the world. With rising atmospheric CO_{2} causing higher temperatures globally, the arctic has been particularly vulnerable to these changes given the large sum of ice caps in the region. The higher temperatures cause the ice caps to melt which in turn, causes the sea level to rise due to the large amount of water displaced. One of the most alarming consequences of this, along with coastal flooding and submersion, is the vicious cycle created by the substitution of white ice with dark ocean. The latter, indeed, will absorb the sunlight causing more heat, which accelerates the warming process and leads to even more melting.

=== Historical trends and records ===
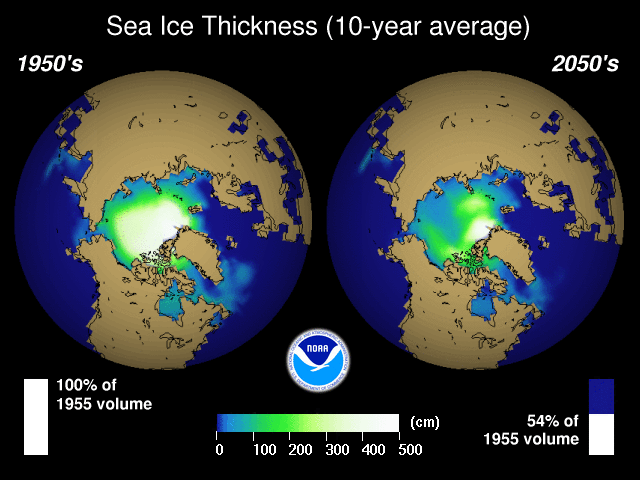
Projected thickness of Arctic Ice over 100 year timespan.

Since the 1970s, the amount of annual sea ice began to drop, and in 2007 an unprecedented record was registered: the decline reached an amount of sea ice 38% lower than the average from 1979-2000.

Furthermore, according to the American National Snow and Ice Data Centre (NSIDC), in the same period (1979-2000), the ice covered a sea surface of 6.71 million square kilometres, compared to the 4.3 square kilometres registered in 2011.

In 2007 it was also registered an amount of melted ice greater than one million square miles, halving the quantity present in the 1950s, with an annual decline rate of 4.7% The 2004 Arctic Climate Impact Assessment registered in 2002 an increase of 16% of melting in the Greenland ice cap, compared to the levels in 1979. he complete melting of this area represents a major threat, considering the consequences. The sea level would rise up to 7.2 metres, with alteration of the biodiversity and other dramatic outcomes

=== The Blue Ocean Event ===
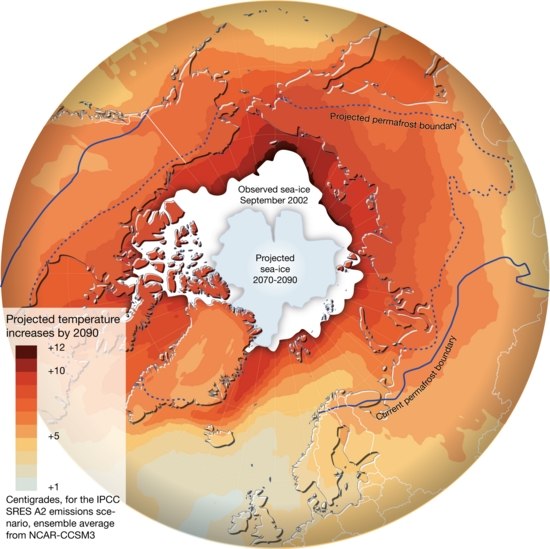
Projected temperature increases in the Arctic due to climate change, 2090 (NCAR-CCM3, SRES A2 experiment). Climate change, due to increased concentrations of greenhouse gases in the atmosphere, has led to increased temperatures and large scale changes in the Arctic. The Arctic sea ice is decreasing, permafrost thawing and the glaciers and ice sheets are shrinking. The projected climate situation in 2090 are presented in this figure, the temperatures are annual values from the NCAR-CCM3 model, ensemble averages 1-5 for the SRES A2 experiment. The ice and permafrost are from the ACIA (Arctic Climate Impact Assessment). Author: Hugo Ahlenius, UNEP/GRID-Arendal.

The Arctic Ocean would be considered “ice-free”, also referred to as “Blue Ocean Event”, with less than one million square kilometres of sea ice. The NSIDC expects it to happen by 2060, whereas other studies have highlighted a 60 percent probability that this will happen during the 2030s. However, although the possible risk, it remains still difficult to really predict.

=== Permafrost thaw ===
The issue of the permafrost thawing, related to the ice melting, is also of fundamental importance. This phenomenon dramatically increases the emissions of CO2 and methane, further accelerating global warming.

== States' Arctic strategies ==
The new concern for the impact of climate change on the Arctic region, as well as the acknowledgment of the abundance of resources of which this area is rich, pushed both Arctic and non-Arctic states to publish reports and action plans in order to confirm and reinforce their role in the region and ensure their interests.

On the one hand, Arctic states are really concerned about safeguarding their rights over natural resources and sovereignty over territories, when dealing with environmental protection and cooperation for that aim. On the other hand, non-Arctic actors also showed considerable willingness to participate.

It is becoming very crucial for states to seek a sustainable economy that allows them to satisfy their commercial purposes, preserving at the same time such an endangered region.

The 2008 Ilulissat Declaration represents a pivotal document in this context. In this Declaration, the five Arctic states - Canada, Denmark, Norway, Russia and the United States - pointed out their sovereign authority over "large areas of the Arctic Ocean", with a "stewardship role in protecting Arctic ecosystems”.

=== The Arctic Climate Impact Assessment ===
The Arctic Climate Impact Assessment, published in 2004, can be considered the key inspiration for the various national Arctic action plans. Headed by the Arctic Council and the non-governmental International Arctic Science Committee, with the collaboration of hundreds of scientists, it represents the first important evaluation of the climate change's impacts on the Arctic region and on a global scale. It addresses “environmental, human health, social, cultural, and economic impacts and consequences, including policy recommendations.”.

=== National strategies ===
After that, the first country to publish its own “High North Strategy” was Norway in 2006, with the aim of creating “sustainable growth and development in the region following three overarching principles: presence, activity and knowledge”.

Russia followed in 2008, with up to eight key objectives for environmental protection.

In the same year, Denmark and Greenland issued their action plans too, although the “Kingdom of Denmark Strategy for the Arctic”, including also the Faroe Islands, was published only in 2011.

The United States, Canada, Finland and, eventually, Sweden, completed the first cycle of publications between 2009 and 2011.

== Climate change as source of new opportunities ==
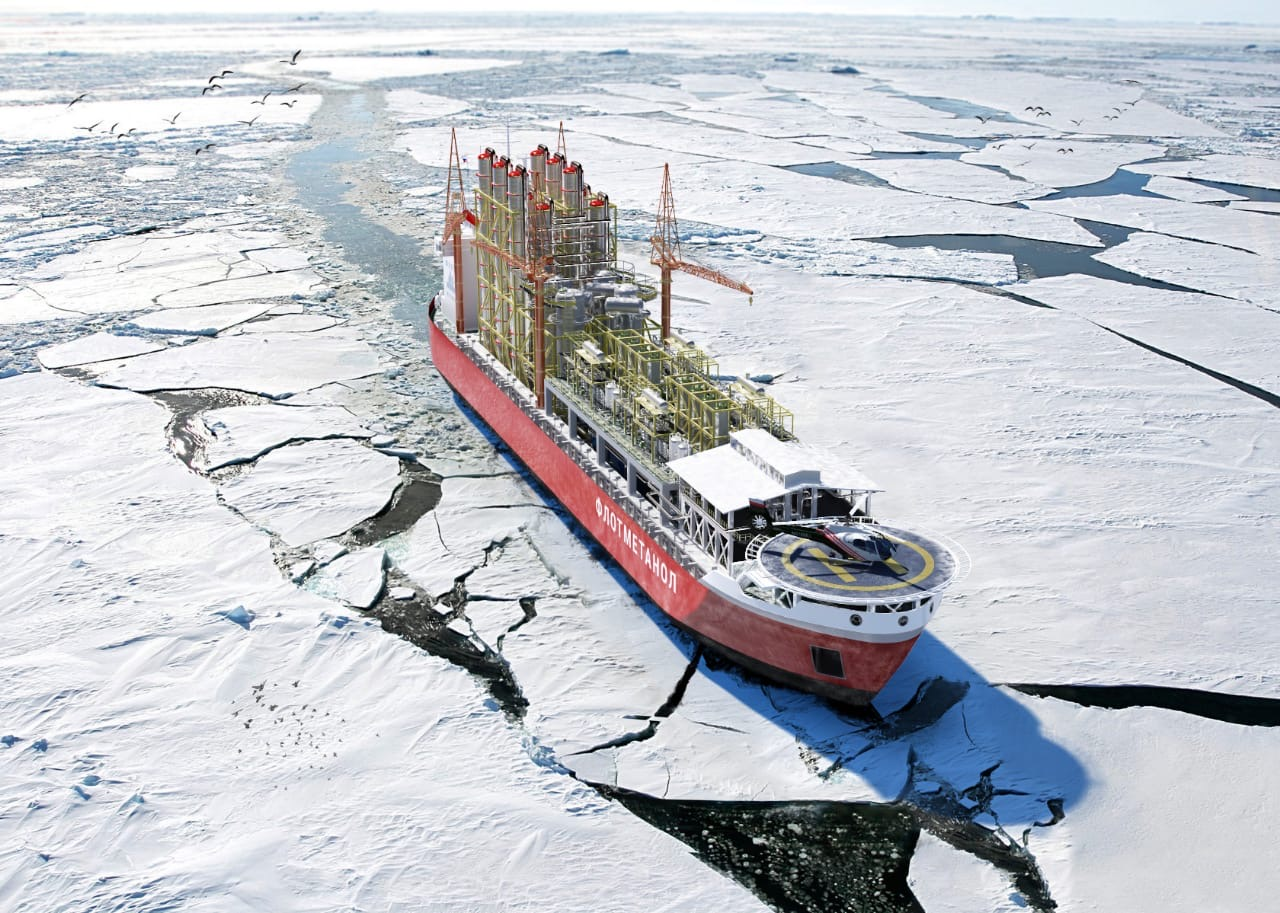
Methanol Shipyard. Author: FlotMethanol.

Climate change in the Arctic region represents a dichotomy: on the one hand, it dramatically impacts the environment and the ecosystem, with the dangerous outcomes for the region and for the entire world that we previously mentioned.

On the other hand, the warming process in this extremely cold and harsh context can pave the way for many new economic opportunities. That is exactly what both Arctic and non-Arctic states are lately seeking.

=== Academic approaches ===
Two main discourses explain this dichotomy between negative and positive outcomes of climate change. The scientific thought is mostly concerned with the environmental impacts that will negatively affect not just the Arctic region, but the entire planet.

The neoliberal approach highlights how states, through a new process of capitalisation, will face new possibilities of resource exploitation.

The “end of the Arctic”, introduced by Ed Struzik in 1992, is now challenged by the idea of a “new age of accessibility”. However, it must not be forgotten that the latter, having attracted both multinationals and governments from all over the world, may threaten even more the ecosystem, for obvious reasons related to polluting activities.

The “prospects for investment and economic development” are mainly directed towards the exploitation of the resources and the new transport sea routes from Europe to Asia and America, opened by the retreating ice.

=== The Northwest Passage ===
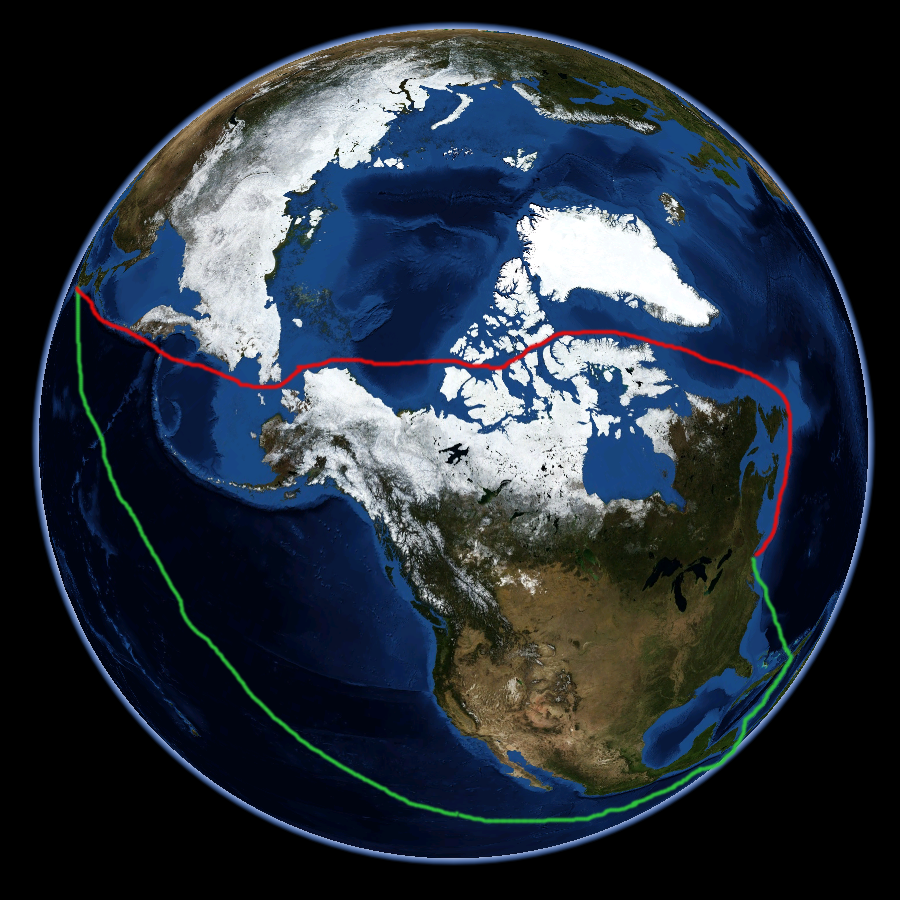
New York – Tokyo: Northwest passage = 14000 km (red line), via Panama Canal = 18200 km (green line)

The American NSIDC registered the first opening of the Northwest Passage in 2007, and the Northeast Passage in 2008, thanks (or due) to the melting. The commercial potential of this unprecedented event was discussed during the first transportation conference, that took place on the 5th of June, 2008.

The accessibility to the Northern Sea Route is not only amazing in commercial terms, but it involves a positive environmental aspect: the average travel distance for ships would be reduced by approximately 40%. That would cut fuel costs (end emissions) by 3–5% compared to the Suez Canal.

=== Documents and policies ===
This rise of new interests has been analysed in many documents and policies. Firstly, in the Global Governance 2025 joint assessment, issued in 2010 by the European Institute for Security Studies and the American National Intelligence Council. In the end of the report, one of the annexes is entitled “The Arctic: challenge or opportunity for global governance?”. It is then underlined how “a region that has generally been understood as being outside the current of global affairs is becoming central to them”.

The 2008 European Arctic Policy seeks to reach a balance combining “exploration of resources” and environmental protection.

Moreover, according to the Danish study “Denmark's Third National”, conducted in 2003, changes in geography, specifically the retraction of glaciers and icecaps, could serve detrimental to the tourism industry in Greenland and it would facilitate communication between boats, increasing safety and efficiency.

Climate change, along with the dramatic impact it has on the environment, can actually shape the geopolitics of regions by redesigning their conformation. And that is exactly how it is turning the Arctic into a crucial region for geopolitical interests.

== Main documents ==
- 1991 Arctic Environmental Protection Strategy
- 1992 UN Framework Convention on Climate Change
- 1996 Arctic Council.
- 1997 Kyoto Protocol
- 2004 Arctic Climate Impact Assessment
- 2007 American Survey of Undiscovered Oil and Gas in the Arctic
- 2007 Bali Action Plan
- 2008 Ilulissat Declaration
- 2008 European Arctic Policy
- 2010 Global Governance 2025

== Arctic actors (part of the Arctic Council) ==
Arctic States (members)	Non-Arctic States (observers)
Canada	France
Kingdom of Denmark	Germany
Finland	Italy
Iceland	Japan
Norway	The Netherlands
Russia	China
Sweden	Poland
The United States	India
	South Korea
	Singapore
	Spain
	Switzerland
	United Kingdom

== See also ==
- Arctic
- Arctic ecology
- Arctic Search and Rescue Agreement
- Arctic sanctuary
