= Arctic policy of Canada =

The Arctic policy of Canada includes both the foreign policy of Canada in regard to the Arctic region and Canada's domestic policy towards its Arctic territories. This includes the devolution of powers to the territories. Canada's Arctic policy includes the plans and provisions of these regional governments. It encompasses the exercise of sovereignty, social and economic development, the protection of the environment, and the improving and devolving of governance.

Canada, along with the 7 other Arctic nations, is a member of the Arctic Council. On August 23, 2012, Prime Minister Stephen Harper announced that Nunavut MP Leona Aglukkaq would serve as chair of the Arctic Council when Canada assumed the Chairmanship from Sweden in May 2013.

Along with its mainland in the upper regions of North America, Canada claims sovereignty over the related continental shelf and the Arctic Archipelago. It considers the waters between the islands of the Archipelago to be Canadian Internal Waters. The United States among others considers those to be international waters.

Canada has more Arctic land mass than any other country but one of the smallest Arctic populations. Canada's Arctic land is included within the administrative regions of the Northwest Territories, Nunavut, and Yukon, although geographically and in some cases legally, parts of Newfoundland and Labrador and Northern Quebec are included as well. As of 2011, approximately 107,265 Canadians live in the Arctic.

== History ==
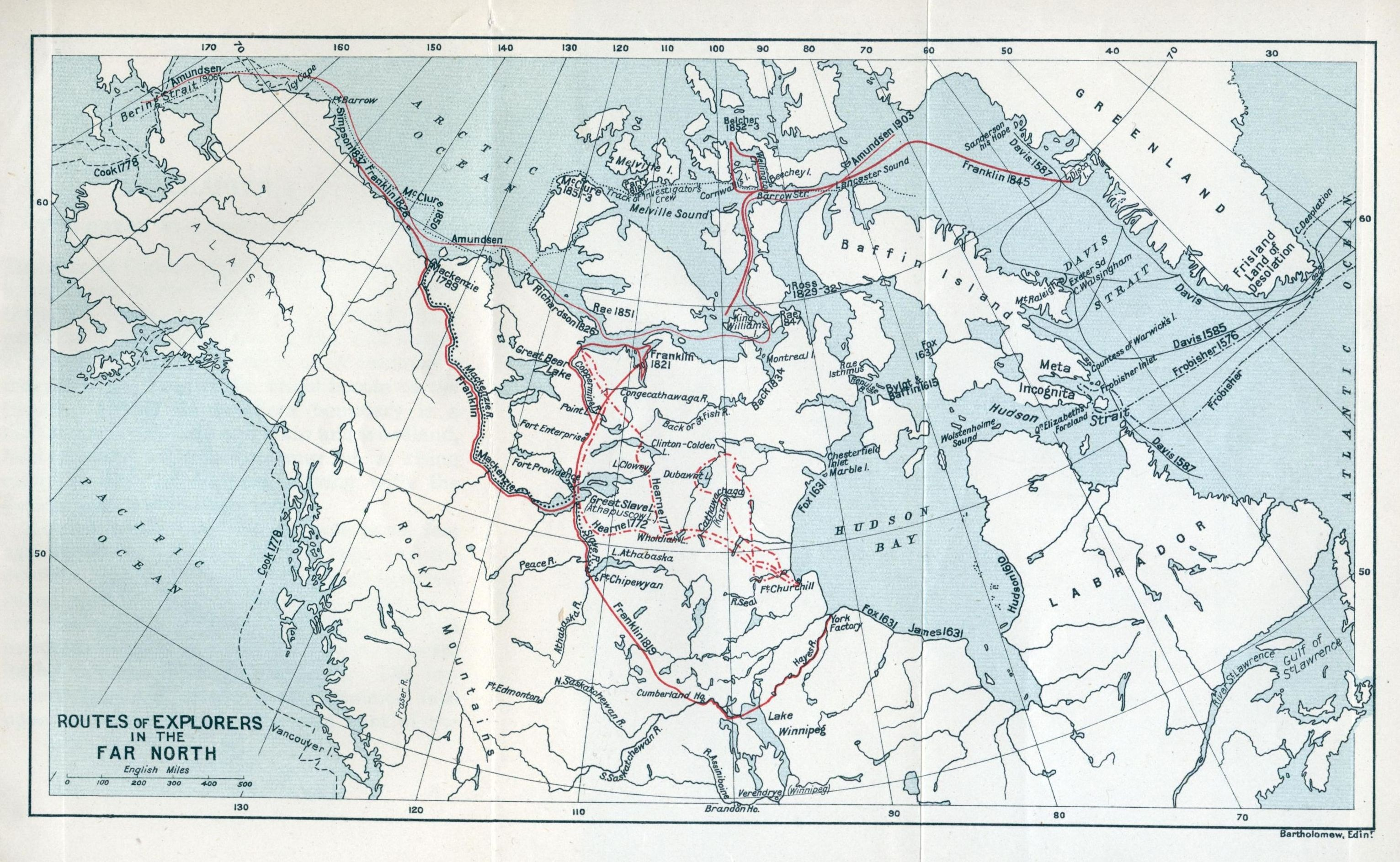
Stephen Leacock's 1914 map of Arctic explorers

Government interest in the North began with the English explorations of Frobisher and Davis in the 1500s and the 1670 Hudson's Bay Company (HBC) charter. The HBC charter gave the company title to Rupert's Land, the watershed of Hudson Bay. In 1821, the rest of the present-day Northwest Territories and Nunavut south of the Arctic coast was added to the charter. Then, in 1870, the Hudson's Bay Company transferred title to its lands to Canada with its purchase of Rupert's Land. Thus, the new dominion acquired legal sovereignty over all of what is now northern Canada except for the Arctic islands. This northern mainland sovereignty has never been questioned although there have been challenges to Canada's Arctic sovereignty in the past.

In 1880 the government of the United Kingdom of Great Britain and Ireland transferred to Canada the rest of its possessions in the Arctic, including "all Islands adjacent to any such Territories" whether discovered by British or foreigners, or not yet discovered.

Further historical information related to Canadian Arctic policy can be found in the sections which follow.

== Geography ==
The Arctic region

=== Definition of Arctic ===
The term "Arctic" varies in its usage. It can be defined as north of the Arctic Circle (66° 33'N). Alternatively, it can be defined as the region where the average temperature for the warmest month (July) is below 10 °C (50 °F); the northernmost tree line roughly follows the isotherm at the boundary of this region. Socially and politically, the Arctic region includes the northern territories of the eight Arctic states, although by natural science definitions much of this territory is considered subarctic.

Canadian geographer Louis-Edmond Hamelin developed the nordicity index, having ten natural and human components:

1. latitude
2. summer heat
3. annual cold
4. types of ice
5. total precipitation
6. natural vegetation cover
7. accessibility by means other than air
8. air service
9. population
10. degree of economic activity

Using these components, he calculated regional values whereby he subdivided Canada into Near North, Middle North, Far North and Extreme North.

=== Population ===
A large part of Canada is in the Arctic region. Administratively this is split between the Northwest Territories, Nunavut, and Yukon. About 107,000 Canadians live in the Arctic. This compares with the other countries' Arctic regions as follows:

1. Russia – 2,000,000
2. USA – 731,449 (includes entire population of Alaska, most which is below the Arctic Circle)
3. Arctic Norway – 470,757
4. Iceland – 321,857
5. Sweden – 250,000
6. Finland – 184,000
7. Canada – 107,265 (includes entire population of Yukon, Northwest Territories, and Nunavut, much of which is below the Arctic Circle)
8. Denmark – 106,079 (Greenland and Faroe Islands)

Note: The statistic given for Iceland refers to its entire population. However, Iceland is almost entirely sub-Arctic, as are the Faroe Islands.

=== The Inuit ===
The Inuit are Aboriginal peoples originating in the Canadian Arctic and other polar nations. The word Inuit means "people" in Inuktitut, the language of the Inuit.

Although the 50,480 Inuit listed in the 2006 Canada Census can be found throughout Canada the majority, 44,470 (88.1%), live in four regions lying north of the 54th parallel.

As of the 2006 Canada Census there were 4,715 (9.3%) Inuit living in Newfoundland and Labrador and about 2,160 (4.3%) live in Nunatsiavut. There are also about 6,000 NunatuKavut people (Labrador Metis or Inuit-metis) living in southern Labrador in what is called NunatuKavut.

As of the 2006 Canada Census there were 4,165 (10.1%) Inuit living in the Northwest Territories. The majority, about 3,115 (6.2%), live in the six communities of the Inuvialuit Settlement Region.

As of the 2006 Canada Census there were 24,640 (84.0%) Inuit living in Nunavut. In Nunavut the Inuit population forms a majority in all communities and is the only jurisdiction of Canada where Aboriginal peoples form a majority.

Canadian Arctic Archipelago

As of the 2006 Canada Census there were 10,950 (21.7%) Inuit living in Quebec. The majority, about 9,565 (19.0%), live in Nunavik.

=== The Arctic Archipelago ===
Canadian sovereignty over the lands of the Arctic Archipelago is no longer disputed.

From 1898 to 1902 Otto Sverdrup explored in the high Arctic. He discovered the islands of Axel Heiberg, Ellef Ringnes and Amund Ringnes, known as Sverdrup Islands, and claimed them for Norway. He was the first known European to have set foot on them. Norway retained territorial interests in the islands until 1930 when it formally recognized the sovereignty of Britain (Canada) over them.

Historically, occupation of the land has been considered important in establishing sovereignty. This led to a variety of initiatives of the Canadian government. From 1953 to 1955, eighty-seven Inuit were moved by the Government of Canada to the High Arctic. In the 1990s this relocation became a point of controversial scrutiny. The government's motives seem to have included this need to occupy the land.

The waterways, including the Northwest Passage, within the Archipelago remain in dispute. Canada considers them internal waters while the United States considers them international waters.

=== Arctic Circle ===
Map of the Arctic with the Arctic Circle in blue.

The eight northern countries listed above all have territory within the Arctic Circle. Several of these make conflicting claims of sovereignty. The United States and Canada do not agree on their boundaries in the Beaufort Sea. Canada and Denmark both claim the small Hans Island off of Greenland. Russia, Denmark and Canada all claim common sections of the Lomonosov Ridge.

== Policy statements ==
In 2007, the three Canadian territorial governments released "A Northern Vision: A Stronger North and a Better Canada". The vision's main themes are sovereignty, circumpolar relations and climate change.

In 2009, the Government of Canada presented Canada's Northern Strategy: Our North, Our Heritage, Our Future. It focused on four objectives:

The Government of Canada has a clear vision for the North, in which:

1. self-reliant individuals live in healthy, vital communities, manage their own affairs and shape their own destinies;
2. the Northern tradition of respect for the land and the environment is paramount and the principles of responsible and sustainable development anchor all decision-making and action;
3. strong, responsible, accountable governments work together for a vibrant, prosperous future for all – a place whose people and governments are significant contributing partners to a dynamic, secure Canadian federation; and
4. we patrol and protect our territory through enhanced presence on the land, in the sea and over the skies of the Arctic.

On August 23, 2010, the Prime Minister of Canada, Stephen Harper said that protection of Canada's sovereignty over its northern regions was its number one and "non-negotiable priority" in Arctic policy. Canada has slated $109 million, to be spent before 2014, for research to substantiate extended continental shelf claims in the Arctic region.

Canada's Arctic policy priorities are:

1. Exercise Canadian sovereignty,
2. Promote economic and social development,
3. Protect the arctic environment, and
4. Improve and devolve governance.
In September 2019, the Arctic and Northern Policy Framework was launched. The framework identified eight goals:
1. Improve Arctic and northern Indigenous population resiliency
2. Improve infrastructure
3. Create sustainable, diversified economy
4. Knowledge and understanding drives decision-making process
5. Arctic and northern ecosystem are healthy and resilient
6. Rules-based international order that can effectively respond to changing challenges and opportunities
7. Arctic security
8. Reconciliation supports self-determination

== The exercise of sovereignty ==
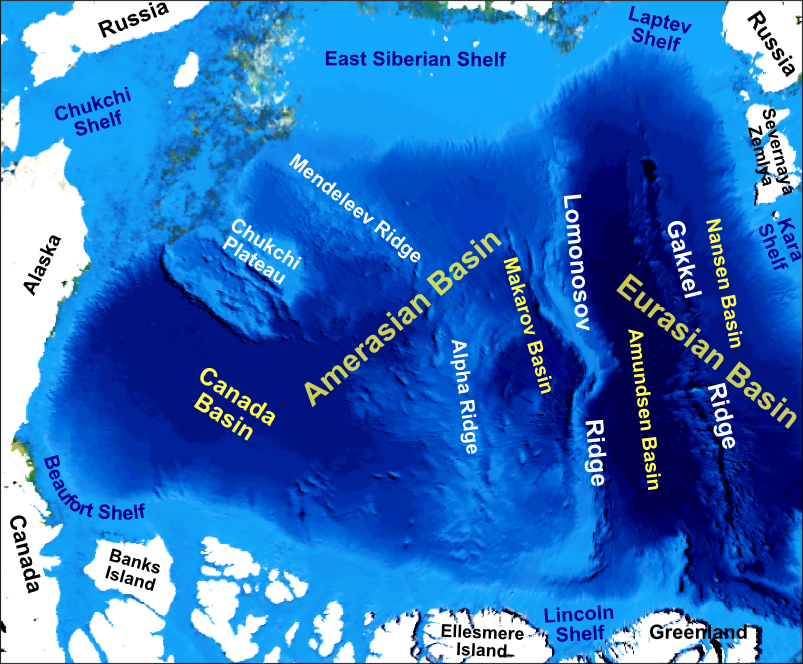
Bathymetric features of the Arctic Ocean

Canada has had historic difficulty supporting its Arctic claims of sovereignty due to the sparsity of population, remoteness, and difficulty in effectively demonstrating administrative capacity. Most challenges to Canada's arctic sovereignty have historically come from the United States. As claims of sovereignty in the Arctic solidified with the end of territorial disputes around the Alaska panhandles, Canada's efforts at demonstrating sovereignty have shifted from the mainland of the north, to the Arctic Archipelago. Most recently, Canada's claims that the marine passageways within the Archipelago are Canadian internal waters have been actively challenged by the United States, who claims instead that these are international waters.

In 1969, the SS Manhattan and, in 1985, the Polar Sea, both United States ships, sparked controversy in Canada by traveling through the waters of the Arctic Archipelago without the permission of Canada. Due to the remoteness of the area and a lack of capacity, Canada did not learn of the voyages until after they had occurred, a clear challenge to Canada's arctic claims. In the aftermath of both incidents, Canada strengthened its legislation covering such voyages and devoted additional attention to developing its capacity (both military and otherwise) for operating in the Arctic in support of its sovereignty claims.

In 2026, following U.S. President Donald Trump's threats to seize Greenland, Canada deepened its Arctic defense cooperation with Nordic countries. In March, Canada and the five Nordic nations agreed to enhance military procurement and defense production. Prime Minister Mark Carney described the Nordics as "trusted partners" as Canada sought to pivot from relying solely on the United States for Arctic security.

== Economic and social development ==
The Inuit have been hunters for millennia. As they interacted with Europeans they became trappers and dependent on foreign economic forces.

=== Education ===
ArcticNet's Schools on Board program is based out of The Clayton H. Riddell Faculty of Environment, Earth and Resources at the University of Manitoba in Winnipeg. It helps connect high schools across Canada with those conducting climate change research in the Arctic. They educate young Canadians concerning the challenges and career opportunities in Arctic research. Participating schools send students and teachers to the Arctic, on board CCGS Amundsen, to do field research with the ArcticNet science team.

=== Health Care ===
Policy concerns include adequate nutrition, suicide rates, toxic pollution, tuberculosis, and adequate housing.

== Protection of the environment ==
Environmental concerns include global warming, preservation of flora and fauna, shipping traffic, and oil exploration. As a consequence of the SS Manhattan's venture through the Northwest Passage, the Canadian government enacted the Arctic Waters Pollution Prevention Act.

== Improving and devolving governance ==
Canada has had a paternalistic relationship with its Aboriginal peoples in the past. The creation of Nunavut has helped promote self-governance.

== Scientific Research ==
Many Canadian institutions conduct research in the Arctic. As part of its Arctic policy, in the summer of 2010, the Canadian Government announced plans to build a High Arctic Research Station. This station was built as an integral part of Canada's Northern Strategy and serves political purposes, such as asserting Canada's sovereignty in the high north, as much as concrete research objectives. Cambridge Bay was chosen after a feasibility study that also included Pond Inlet and Resolute as potential locations. It is a year-round, multidisciplinary facility exploring the cutting-edge of Arctic science and technology issues which opened in 2019. Total cost was $250 million.

== Legal landscape ==
Legislation governing Arctic policy is expanding due to the opportunities opened up by the melting of Arctic summer ice such as natural resource extraction and expedited shipping routes.

== See also ==
International initiatives

- Arctic Council
- Arctic Climate Impact Assessment
- Arctic cooperation and politics
- Arctic Environmental Protection Strategy
- Arctic Ocean Conference
- Arctic Search and Rescue Agreement
- United Nations Convention on the Law of the Sea

Nation states policies

- Arctic policy of European Union
- Arctic policy of Denmark
- Arctic policy of Finland
- Arctic policy of Norway
- Arctic policy of Russia
- Arctic policy of Sweden
- Arctic policy of the United States
- Arctic policy of China
- Arctic policy of South Korea

Foreign relations of Canada

- Foreign relations of Canada (section Arctic disputes)
- Arctic (section International cooperation and politics)

Canadian institutions

- Canadian Polar Commission
- Canadian Rangers
- Inuit Tapiriit Kanatami

Canadian history

- Nunavut Implementation Commission

Canadian individuals of influence

- List of people from Nunavut
- List of people from Yukon
- Category:People from the Northwest Territories
- Nellie Cournoyea
- Eva Aariak, former premier of Nunavut
- Bill Lyall
- Louis-Edmond Hamelin
- Mary Simon
- Carolyn Bennett, Liberal critic on Arctic policy
- Vilhjalmur Stefansson, 1879–1962, explorer

Arctic concepts and terms

- North Atlantic triangle
- Territorial waters
