= Arctic policy of Iceland =

The Arctic policy of Iceland refers to the foreign policy of Iceland in regard to the Arctic region.

Iceland is a member of the Arctic Council. Iceland does not agree that the Arctic five should meet separately, as they did at the Arctic Ocean Conference.

General topographic map

== Policy statements ==
March 28, 2011, the Althing passed a resolution on Iceland's Arctic Policy including the following: Promoting and strengthening the Arctic Council; Securing Iceland as a coastal State within the Arctic; Promoting concept that the Arctic region extends both to the North Pole and to the closely connected North Atlantic area; Resolving differences in the Arctic using United Nations Convention on the Law of the Sea; Increasing cooperation with the Faroe Islands and Greenland to promote the interests of the three countries; Supporting the indigenous rights in the Arctic; Cooperating with other States and stakeholders on issues relating to Icelandic interests in the Arctic; Working to prevent human-induced climate change and its effects in order to improve the well-being of Arctic residents; Safeguarding broadly defined security interests through civilian means and working against all militarization of the Arctic; Increasing trade relations between Arctic States; Advancing Icelanders' knowledge of Arctic issues and promoting Iceland abroad as a venue for Arctic conferences; Increasing consultations and cooperation at the domestic level on Arctic issues.

== Scientific research ==
Iceland conducts various kinds of scientific research in Arctic matters. An overview of institutions working on Arctic matters can be seen on the website on the Icelandic Arctic Cooperation Network.

== See also ==
International initiatives

- Arctic Cooperation and Politics
- Arctic Council
- Arctic Environmental Protection Strategy
- Arctic Ocean Conference
- Arctic Search and Rescue Agreement
- Territorial claims in the Arctic
- United Nations Convention on the Law of the Sea

Nation states policies

- Arctic policy of European Union
- Arctic policy of China
- Arctic policy of Russia

Foreign relations of Iceland

- Arctic (section International cooperation and politics)

Arctic concepts and terms

- Nordicity
