= ICE Pact =

Trilateral agreement between the United States, Canada and Finland

Icebreaker Collaboration Effort
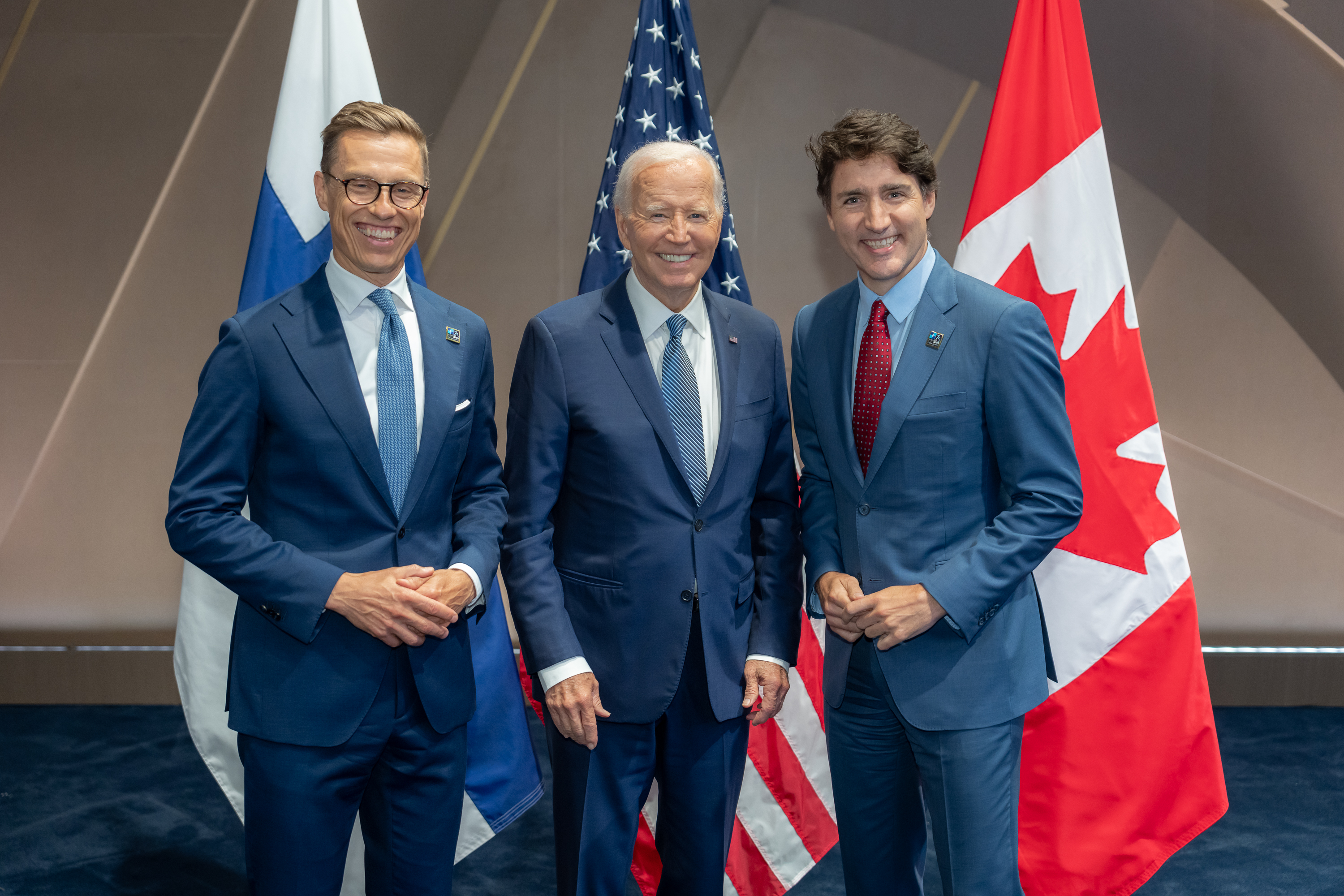
- Finnish President Alexander Stubb, U.S President Joe Biden and Canadian Prime Minister Justin Trudeau at the Walter E. Washington Convention Center in Washington, D.C.
- Type: Tripartite treaty
- Signed: 11 July 2024
- Location: Washington, D.C. United States
- Original signatories: Canada; Finland; United States
- Signatories: Canada Justin Trudeau; Finland Alexander Stubb; United States Joe Biden
- Languages: English; Finnish

The Icebreaker Collaboration Effort, commonly referred to as the ICE Pact, is a trilateral partnership between the United States, Canada and Finland. The ICE Pact was formed on 11 July 2024 in Washington, D.C. The ICE Pact is a partnership in efforts to bolster shipbuilding capacities and industries, especially the enhancing of icebreaker ship production capacity in Canada and Finland, and to counter the influence of the Russian Federation and China in the Arctic region.

The United States formed the ICE Pact to strengthen the United States Coast Guard and to accelerate icebreaker shipbuilding for itself and allies with assistance from Finland and Canada. The country of manufacture is yet to be determined; US rules currently require navy ships to be manufactured in the United States, but not privately owned ships (though there are Jones Act (Merchant Marine Act of 1920) restrictions on transport services). Canada has contracted for one heavy icebreaker from Seaspan ULC in British Columbia and plans to contract a second from Davie Shipbuilding in Quebec. Canada has contracted 16 icebreaking multipurpose vessels from Seaspan (currently in functional design as of August 2024 with detailed design starting in the first half of 2025) and 6 medium icebreakers from Davie (initial contract was awarded in March 2024). Finland has "know-how"; Helsinki Shipyard has built more than half of the world's icebreakers. The US has an overall goal of 70-90 Arctic-capable ships built within a decade. Canada is mainly to help with the ramping up and scaling of icebreaker ship building capacity.

On 13 November 2024, in Washington, D.C., representatives from Canada, the United States and Finland signed a Memorandum of Understanding (MOU) to collaborate on building icebreakers for the Arctic region.

Finland and the United States have signed a memorandum of understanding on icebreaker cooperation. Finnish President Alexander Stubb and US President Donald Trump signed the memorandum of understanding in connection with their meeting in Washington on 9 October 2025. Finnish Prime Minister Petteri Orpo participated in the meeting between the presidents. The Finnish-US memorandum of understanding on icebreaker cooperation lays the foundation for commercial agreements between the US Coast Guard and Finnish companies.

== Background ==
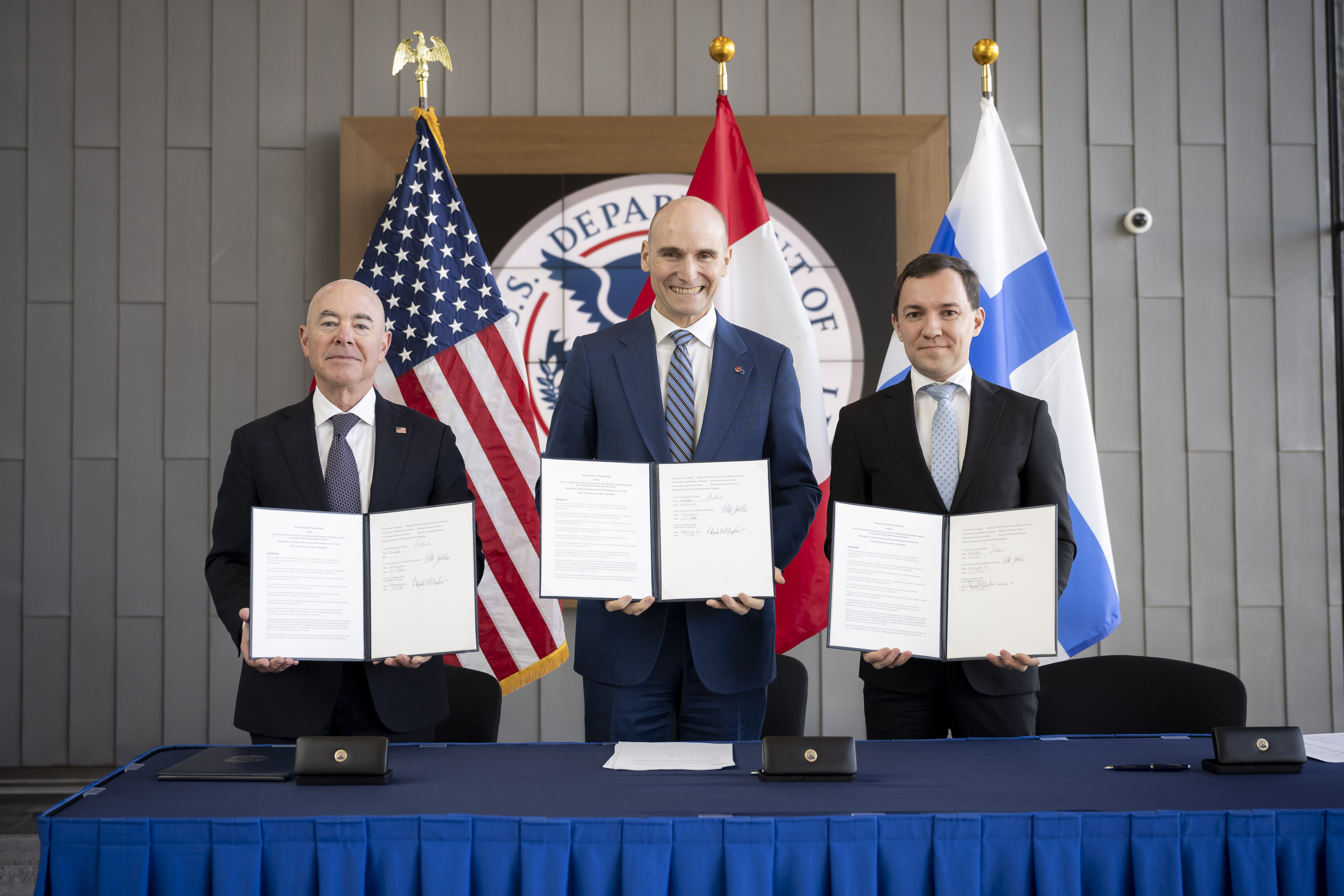
Signing the Icebreaker Collaboration Effort (ICE) Pact Memorandum of Understanding (MOU)

Geopolitical map of the Arctic region which includes the Arctic Circle

The United States started cutting off military cooperation with Russia after the 2014 Annexation of Crimea by Russia.

Following the 2022 Russian Invasion of Ukraine, Finland and Sweden joined the North Atlantic Treaty Organisation (NATO). Both Finland and Sweden are members of the Arctic Council and in the Arctic region, however only Finland has become a member of the Icebreaker Collaboration Effort. In response to Finland bordering the Russian Federation and it being an "unfriendly nation", Finland has taken efforts to increase its military collaboration with NATO allies, especially with members of the Arctic region, such as the United States. The other members of the Arctic Council started excluding Russia from Arctic coordination after the 2022 invasion.

By 2024, after-effects of the COVID-19 pandemic put shipbuilding in the United States years behind schedule, with shortages of experienced labour, supply chain delays, and design problems.

With increasing temperatures due to climate change making navigation in more of the area more feasible more of the time, the Russian Federation seeks to exploit resources in the Arctic and to open trade routes in the far north through the Northwest and Northeast Passages. China also has had interests in the Arctic for a while, especially since 2013 when China gained a permanent observer status in the Arctic Council, and China seeks to extend military capabilities, conduct research, and wishes to excavate resources in the Arctic.

== See also ==
- Arctic policy of Canada
- Arctic policy of Finland
- Arctic policy of the United States
- Polar Security Cutter program
