= Arctic policy of Norway =

Foreign relations policy

The Arctic policy of Norway consists of Norway's foreign relations with other Arctic countries, and Norway's government policies on issues occurring within the geographic boundaries of "the Arctic" or related to the Arctic or its people. Since Norway is itself an Arctic nation, the Arctic Policy of Norway includes its domestic policies as regards the Norwegian Arctic region.

The Arctic policy shapes Norway's relations with other Arctic countries, as well as its policies on its own Arctic areas. Northern Norway accounts for 35% of Norway's mainland territory, and 9% of its population lives within the Arctic Circle. Economic stability, development, and facilitation of opportunities in these areas are therefore regarded as issues of national interest.

In Norway, development in the High North, including the Arctic, has been the government's highest foreign policy priority since 2005. The Norwegian Government's High North strategy was released December 1, 2006.

In academic literature, Norway's expansive foreign policy and role in the Arctic has been described as a "small power acting big". The Norwegian Arctic policy concerns topics of environmental degradation, resource extraction, military presence, and fisheries, among others. The aims of the Arctic policies are to further develop the High North region to further safeguard Norwegian interests in the Arctic. Norway was a founding member of the Nordic Council when it was formed in 1952 alongside Denmark, Iceland, and Sweden. Norway held both the chairmanship for the Arctic Council, from 2023 to 2025, and the presidency of the Nordic Council. Today, Norway stands as one of the most progressive and engaged Arctic nations regarding academic activities, conservation and leadership in the Arctic.

== Background ==
In the early 1970s urbanization in Norway led to a relative decrease in population in the northernmost areas of mainland Norway. Since then, the Norwegian government has instantiated extensive policies to incentivize both population growth and economic development in the region.

In the 1970s when Norwegian politicians were making foundational and strategic work on its Arctic Policy the term "Nordområdene" (Northern areas) was coined. In English, the term translates to the "Northern Areas", and goes beyond the areas within the Arctic Circle. In the academic literature on Arctic Policy the term "High North Policy" is often used as an equivalent conceptualization. Nordområdene is the official term of the Norwegian government on Arctic policy, and policy relating the surrounding areas.

The geographic definition of nordområdene is from the South of Helgeland in the South, and the Greenlandic Sea in the West, and the Pestjora sea in the east. The term is especially associated with safeguarding Norwegian interests through a series of national and international efforts in the northern areas. This Norwegian conceptualization of policies on "Nordområdene" has inspired other Arctic Nations to make their own policies, also including areas close to the arctic circle. Furthermore, the widespread adoption and use of the term display Norway's influence in the region as a progressive and engaged Arctic nation.

During the Cold-War Norway held a high geopolitical status due to US and NATO relations, as well as bilateral relations and border-sharing with Russia. In the aftermath of the Cold- War Norway struggled with what scholars have named "diplomatic invisibility", which was a central problem for the public diplomacy of Norway in the early 2000s. To solve the issue of diplomatic invisibility the foreign ministry employed the (Foreign Policy Centre) to develop a new public diplomacy strategy released in June 2003.

The new strategy identified four main areas that Norway was to focus its strategic efforts towards, based on shares Norwegian values and norms. It was then decided that Norway were to present themselves as a; humanitarian superpower, a society living with nature, high-level of equality and Norway as an internationalist society. These policy developments further support the notion that Norway is intentionally framing itself as a "small power acting big".

Norway, through its domestic and Arctic policy efforts, has also established itself as a provider of indigenous rights in the region. Norway played a central role in the launch of the Global Indigenous Peoples movement when it granted the Sami people its own parliament "Sametinget". Sametinget now serves as an advisory political tool to strengthen the indigenous people's role in discussions of resource development and sovereignty of ancestral land. Norway's institutionalization of cooperation and inclusion of indigenous peoples on policy issues has since then become a pillar of its Arctic Policy.

== Norway's geopolitical role ==
Norway has a unique geopolitical role in the Arctic that has been strengthened by the past decades of extensive policies. The Norwegian government states that its "geopolitical location is a key part of its strategic significance beyond demographic" in regional geopolitics. Growing international interests for the Arctic region also further strengthens Norway's geopolitical role and power. In Norway's geopolitical work they aim to continue to emphasize the importance of the rule of law, as well as strong multilateral structures. Furthermore, Norway's NATO membership is a cornerstone of the country's security and defense policy.

One of the pillars of the Norwegian Arctic policy lies in strengthening its geopolitical role and power. Norway was one of the founding members of NATO in 1949, and it has one of the longest coastlines in the world, as well as a shared border with Russia. This makes Norway key military importance to NATO, as it provides a unique geopolitical position in the Arctic.

Norway currently also holds the presidency of the Nordic Council, and the chairmanship in the Arctic Council and it is working actively towards defense-cooperation in the Arctic, as well as aiding all other Nordic countries in becoming members of NATO.

Due to Norway's geography and prosperous coastline, it has an extensive merchant fleet, a large fishing industry and valuable oil and gas resources. Norway is also a shipping country. These conditions are largely why Norway also has a large navy protection for its important industries.

== Arctic policies of Norway ==
Norway has a series of policies and instruments it utilizes to manage its northern territories and gain power and influence in the Arctic region. The Arctic policies of Norway go under the term "Nordområdene" and is identified as the government's most important strategic investment area. The Arctic policies range from leadership roles in regional and transnational councils to climate change research and welfare for the population in the northernmost areas.

=== People, Opportunities and Norwegian interests in the North: Meld. St.9 (2020–2021) ===
Meld. St. 9 (2020–2021) titled "Mennesker, muligheter og norske interesser i nord" (People, Opportunities and Norwegian interest in the North) is the latest official full-text Arctic policy of Norway. It was approved by the Norwegian Government in council with the Crown on 27 November 2020 under the government of Erna Solberg. The 193-page policy document outlines all the main components of Norway's official efforts in the north.

This version of the official public policy in the North builds on a long-standing tradition of safeguarding Norwegian interests in the North through broad international cooperation. The government's overall goals can be summed up into 6 different categories:

- Peace, stability and predictability
- International cooperation and the rule of law
- Holistic and ecosystem-based management
- Increased job and value creation
- Closer cooperation between business and knowledge institutions
- Living attractiveness and welfare

The official policy focuses very broadly on a series of social and geopolitical issues central to the region, and places people at the core of all policy developments. One of the main aims of the policy is to stimulate and incentivise businesses and people to establish themselves in the North. To make this possible there is a need for a series of cohesive policies to make the region attractive. This is both in relation to education, commerce, and infrastructure, as well as stimulating more cultural events and developments.

As international attention is looking towards the Arctic as climate change progresses, the government wishes to be a leader and maintain the northern areas as their most strategic area of responsibility. Central in the policy is also increased effort into ocean research and knowledge building. Norway possesses a position of authority on knowledge of ocean recourses and research and wishes to continue to strengthen its position in more international research cooperation. Furthermore, as the Arctic ice sheet continues to melt due to climate change, the Norwegian Government wishes to build capacity to handle future issues relating to the environment and national security.

=== Norwegian leadership in the Arctic Council 2023-2025 ===
The Norwegian government released in late March 2023 its policies aimed at strengthening its leadership in the Arctic Council. The government views the Arctic Council as the most important transnational forum for Arctic questions. The aim of the policy is to promote stability and constructive cooperating in the Arctic, as well as address sustainable development, and climate change, and bettering the living standards within the Arctic region.

The official policy document highlights four major issues: Ocean, Climate and environment, sustainable economic development, and people in the north. Norway also highlights in its policy document that issues within these categories are inherently interrelated and that mitigation measures should be holistic.

=== Arktis 2030 ===
Arktis 2030 (Arctic 2030) is a supplementary policy aimed at realizing the overall foreign policy goals on the Arctic though funding of projects. Arktis 2030, released in February 2023, will support further development of projects initiated by the government on the "Nordområder". The policy is also directed towards advancing Norwegian interests in Antarctica, as well as promoting Norwegian sovereignty and interests in intentional cooperation in both polar regions.

The responsibility of realizing the Arktis 2030 is divided between the Norwegian foreign ministry and the two northernmost county municipalities, Troms and Finnmark. Furthermore, considering changing geopolitical and security conditions in the Arctic, the policy means will contribute to supporting professional and international structures of cooperation in the high north.

=== New Building Blocks in the North ===
On March 12, 2009 Norway released the report "New Building Blocks in the North" which identifies seven priority areas: 1) climate and the environment; 2) monitoring-emergency response-maritime safety in northern waters; 3) sustainable development of offshore petroleum and renewable marine resources; 4) onshore business development; 5) infrastructure; 6) sovereignty and cross-border cooperation; and 7) the culture and livelihoods of indigenous peoples.

=== Nuclear safety cooperation in the high north ===
Nuclear safety cooperation in the high north (Atomsikkerhetssamarbeidet i nordområdene), has since the 1990s been a comprehensive nuclear safety cooperation with Russia, Ukraine, and other countries in both central Asia as well as in Eastern Europe. The main aim of the cooperation is to protect both the environment, as well as people in the event of a nuclear threat. This cooperation is intended to create a consistent dialogue between partners, as well as to initiate political dialogue.

Norway has since 1995 contributed approximately NOK 2 billion to the nuclear safety cooperation. One of the main concerns for Norway is the removal of nuclear waste from the decommissions naval base in northern Russia. The area currently stands as one of the biggest and most dangerous concentrated accumulations of nuclear waste in the world.

As a result of the Russian invasion of Ukraine the Norwegian foreign ministry has frozen and paused the nuclear waste cooperation in North-West Russia. Norway will no longer aid and finance the project; however, Russian representatives have made a statement that it will continue the nuclear waste cleanup.

=== Regional High North Forum (Regional Nordområdeforum) ===
The regional high north forum was established in the fall of 2016 by the Norwegian government to strengthen the holistic approach to high-North politics. The forum is a regional non-decision-making body for dialogue and common understanding of the issues specific to the high north areas.

The forum has permanent members form the political chairmanship of the Norwegian Foreign Ministry, the Ministry of Industry and Fisheries (NFD) and the Ministry of Local Government and Modernization (KMD), political leadership in the two northern Norwegian counties and the Sami Parliament. The forum also invites other relevant actors and departments depending on the topics raised in the forums. The forum hosts two conferences every year in the North of Norway, and topics often range from the development of Sami culture to fisheries and sustainable development in the North.

=== Other Policies ===
In the 2011 central government budget, a total of NOK 1.2 billion was set aside for initiatives in the High North, a significant portion of which was earmarked for research.

On April 21, 2017, the Norwegian Government released an updated version of its High North Strategy: "Norway's Arctic Strategy - between geopolitics and social development". Its priority areas included "international cooperation, business development, knowledge development, infrastructure, [and] environmental protection and emergency preparedness".

== Norway's cooperative role in the Arctic ==
Norway is a member of multiple regional and transnational councils and networks concerned with the Arctic region.

=== Norway and NATO ===
Historically, Norway has prided itself upon neutrality in global conflict, and peace remains the strongest principle for Norwegian foreign policy. However, after the German occupation during WW2 and later Soviet militarization in their bordering Arctic areas, Norway had to break its long pact with neutrality in favor of the North Atlantic Treaty Organization.

When Norway joined NATO in 1949, the bilateral relations between the Soviet Union and Norway became trickier. During the Cold War, there was an especially thorny question surrounding the stationing of foreign military bases in the Arctic regions of Norway. The Soviet Union saw the stationing of such bases as a direct threat to Soviet territory. Norwegian politicians quickly responded and reassured the Soviet authorities that there would be no foreign bases on Norwegian territory and that their alliance with NATO is purely defensive in nature.

The Norwegian Navy was heavily strengthened during the Cold War; however, Norway also has an air force, home guard, and army to protect its territories. Most of the Norwegian soldiers are stationed above the Arctic Circle.

Every two years the military exercise "Joint Viking" is hosted in Norway for NATO alliance soldiers and partner nations to practice warfare and survival in the Arctic. With every exercise, about 30 000 troops make their way to the Norwegian Arctic areas.

The cold war tensions between the east and the west continued to build up, and NATO intelligence documents from 1953 show that NATO deemed it possible for a Soviet invasion of both Norway and Denmark, through Sweden and Finland. Later in the 60's there were also vast concerns within the alliance around Soviet nuclear submarines entering Atlantic shipping lanes and passing through the strategic Greenland-Iceland-United Kingdom gap.

To defend the vast and sparsely populated arctic areas in northern Europe, NATO established a department with its headquarters outside of Oslo. The NATO Allied Forces of Northern Europe (AFNORTH) had at that time been delegated the overall responsibility of the defense of Norway, Denmark, Northern Germany, and the strategic Baltic Approaches. The AFNORTH command was active throughout the entirety of the cold war as it was preparing for an unwanted attack on the Northern Flank.

Historically Norway has been the only NATO member with direct borders with Russia in the North. Today both Norway and Finland are NATO members with direct borders to Russia, and with the ratification process with Sweden undergoing the position of NATO in the Arctic is getting much stronger.

NATO views Norway as a major strategic actor in the Arctic, and for the alliance itself. In March 2023, NATO Secretary General Jens Stoltenberg met with Norwegian prime minister Jonas Gahr Støre to thank Norway for the key strategic security contributions it has given to the alliance.

=== Norway and The Arctic Council ===
In 1991 the eight Arctic states in collaboration with Arctic indigenous people's organizations signed a non-binding agreement on Arctic Environmental Protection Strategy. Following came a series of partnerships and agreements. The 1996 Ottawa Declaration marks the creation of the Arctic Council with the eight member states and Arctic indigenous people's organizations After 25 years it remains one of the most important regional intergovernmental forums for arctic cooperation, coordination, and interaction.

During the chairmanship for the Arctic Council (2023–2025), Norway's overall goal was to continue to promote stability, constructive cooperation, and sustainable development in the Arctic. The Arctic Council secretariat is situated in Tromsø in Arctic northern Norway.

The Norwegian chairmanship was to work towards core issues in the Arctic including the well-being of Arctic citizens, climate change mitigation, and ocean conservation. They will in their chairman strategy outlined four main strategic priority topics: the oceans, climate and environment, sustainable economic development, and people in the north.

=== Norway and The Nordic Council ===
The Nordic Council (Nordisk råd) is the official body for formal interparliamentary cooperation between the Nordic countries. Since its formation in 1952 it has used focused efforts towards strengthening the Nordic culture and language community. It was founded in the post-war period by Denmark, Sweden, Finland and Norway, after a number of failed attempts at forming a common Nordic cooperation.

Since the 11 of May 2023, Norway has held the presidency of the Nordic Council. Their priorities are to make a safe, green, and young Nordic region. The council's president, Jorodd Asphjell, has been a member of the Nordic Council since 2012. The Norwegian delegation will work for further security in supplies of energy, food, medical supplies and a strong Nordic collaboration. The presidency also aims to further enhance the Nordic defense cooperation. The Norwegian delegation has placed especial emphasis on the importance of Nordic cooperation considering the Russian invasion of Ukraine, the energy crisis and climate change. Furthermore, they want to work to further impower the youth of the region, and view it critical for the Arctic societies and democracies.

=== Bilateral relations with Russia ===
Many of the issues and disputes in the Arctic for Norway have Russia as their counterpart. In academic research, the case of Svalbard has become an important case for discussion of how small-state diplomacy is used in bilateral relations with Russia. In the case of Svalbard the amount of diplomacy used over economic interests and socialization between Norway and Russia has aided in keeping the conflict level low in the region when conflicts have arisen at sea.

Historical advancements in bilateral relations with Russia has unfortunately been reversed as a result of the Russian invasion of Ukraine. Today Russia posed the biggest security and intelligence threat to Norway. Many bilateral projects have in the past years have been suspended, and 15 Russians working at the Russian embassy in Oslo had their visas suspended in April 2023. They were asked to leave as Norway declared them as intelligence officers, and not diplomatic personnel.

Norway wishes to maintain normal diplomatic relations with Russia and emphasizes that Russian diplomats are welcome in Norway, however, they will not allow diplomatic missions that are misused for the purpose of intelligence activities.

== Politics of Svalbard ==
Norway has territory outside of the mainland, one of the most known areas is Svalbard. Svalbard is a Norwegian archipelago located nearly 1,000 km north of mainland Norway at 78 00 N, 20 00E in the Atlantic Ocean. The archipelago has a permanent population of 2,926 (January 2021), and is inhabited by 61% ethnic Norwegians, and 38% foreign population (primarily from Russia, Thailand, Sweden and Ukraine).

In 1920, the treaty of Svalbard (originally known as the Spitsbergen Treaty) ended decades of territorial disputes between Norway and Russia. Through the treaty of Svalbard art 9, from 1925 Norway and Russia committed to not establishing or allowing military presence around the archipelago, however, Norway was accused by Russia in 2022 for having increased military presence around Svalbard. Norway responded with calling the increased military presence as a way of retaining its right to protect its coastline with the Norwegian coast guard.

After the signed treaty of Svalbard Russia has also exercised its own treaty rights and retained its presence and commercial exploration in Svalbard. The city of Barentsburg is a Russian mining town in the fjord of Grønfjorden where 400 inhabitants reside and work in Russian state-owned coal mine and factory. The commercial activities in Barentsburg are hardly profitable, but for Russia it is a way of exercising its right to land on Svalbard and can in many eyes be viewed as a strategic geopolitical affair.

== Norway's research and development in the Arctic ==
Norway has a long history of aiming to become an international leader on research and development on the Arctic region. It has been a fundamental part of many of its public policies throughout the years.

In the 2023-2025 Arctic leadership policy of Norway, one of its main goals is to strengthen the scientific foundation for addressing climate change and sustainable development in the Arctic. In this policy, the state is not only focusing on gathering and publishing academic knowledge but also including more traditional and indigenous knowledge. Norway will in addition continue its efforts in supporting and strengthening international ocean research collaboration and action against marine pollution.

=== Norwegian Polar Institute ===
The Norwegian Polar institute (NPI) is a governmental research institute working with mapping and environmental research in both the Arctic and Antarctica. The Norwegian Polar institute is a directorate under the Norwegian Ministry on Climate and Environment, which advises and the government on polar environmental management.

The history of the institute starts in 1909 with the first state funded scientific expedition to Spitzbergen (Svalbard) by Gunnar Isachsen. Furthermore, as Norway gained sovereignty of Svalbard in 1925, monetary flow from parliament to scientific research on the archipelago became more widespread. After world War II scientific knowledge on polar ice sheets became important for both the Soviet Union and the USA for future military strategies. After a Parliamentary decision in 1947 it was decided that the Norwegian Polar institute was to do research on polar environments, and the Arctic Ocean under the objective of gaining "a leading position in European Arctic research".

Today the Norwegian Polar Institute serves an important advisory role to policymakers and authorities on Arctic and Antarctic management and enhances international cooperation in the Arctic. The institute is situated in Tromsø in Arctic northern Norway, and employs around 160 people (2019). The institute also serves as an advisory body to the Arctic Council and promotes more transnational research cooperation on Arctic issues. The institute owns the research wessel Kornprins Haakon and is running both research satiation and observatories on Svalbard.

=== Havforskningsinstituttet (The Norwegian Ocean Research Institute) ===
Havforskningsinstituttet (The Norwegian marine research Institute), is the largest maritime research institute in Europe with around 1100 employees. Their main activities revolve around research, advising, and monitoring of oceans and oceanic territories. The rationale behind the institute is that their research shall be the foundation for the future use of ocean resources in a sustainable way. The institute is mostly funded by the a variety of different Norwegian governmental bodies, and the 40% of the founding comes from the Norwegian Department of Commerce and Fisheries.

The aim of the institute is to become an international leader in maritime research and advising. The institute has a series of research projects in the Arctic region, specializing in marine pollution, marine ecosystem change, arctic biodiversity, and the state of the Arctic ice sheets to mention some.

=== The Fridtjof Nansen Institute ===
The Fridtjof Nansen Institute is an independent research foundation based right outside of the capital city Oslo. The institute is engaged in environmental, energy and resource management politics and law research, and examines Norway's role in global climate change politics. Its main objective is to examine how Norway is both influenced by, and how it is exerting influence on international frameworks conditions related to issues of the environment and climate change. The organization focuses especially on, but is not limited to, climate change governance in the Arctic and Nordic region.

== Oil and gas in the Arctic region ==
Norway has many oil and gas platforms above the arctic circle, especially in the Barents sea There are 150 exploration wells in this area. Petroleum extraction in the high north has been one of the most contentious and polarizing cleavages in Norwegian petroleum politics. In the 1970 the conflict was mainly between local and commercial interest in the north and fisheries and environmental conservation. Today the topic remains contentious, and the Norwegian government and the state-owned energy company Equinor are often met with widespread criticism and protest when they wish to grant new drillings sites.

In the start of the Norwegian oil adventure, there were many debates about concession rounds on fields north of the 62 latitudes. However, in light of the blow-out accident on the Ekosfisk oil field in 1977, politicians and industry leaders had a hard time opening up for oil field further north and focused on exploration and drilling further south of the Norwegian coastline. In the 1980 oil and gas field exploration continued further north. Today, Norway has a large oil field in the Barents sea, however most drillings were unsuccessful.

The issue of further drilling and exploration in Arctic Norway, remains contentious and partly unresolved. Considering the current energy crisis in Europe and the promises of ambitious climate change mitigation, the Norwegian is under pressure from many angles. The Norwegian Petroleum's politics are deciding in the parliament in cooperation with the government. The Norwegian foreign minister Anniken Huitfeldt said in March 2023, that the aim of the Norwegian government is to continue to grow the petroleum's industry, while working towards mitigating the climate crisis.

== See also ==
- Arctic cooperation and politics
- Arctic Council
- Northern Norway
- Nordic Council
- Nordic model
- Nordic Investment Bank
- Territorial claims in the Arctic
- Visa policy of Svalbard
- Svalbard
- Havforskningsinsituttet
- Norsk Polar Institute
- NATO
- Norway
- NATO Arctic Sentry
