= Arctic Search and Rescue Agreement =

International treaty

The Arctic Search and Rescue Agreement (formally the Agreement on Cooperation on Aeronautical and Maritime Search and Rescue in the Arctic) is an international treaty concluded among the member states of the Arctic Council — Canada, Denmark, Finland, Iceland, Norway, Russia, Sweden and the United States — on 12 May 2011 in Nuuk, Greenland.

The treaty coordinates international search and rescue (SAR) coverage and response in the Arctic, and establishes the area of SAR responsibility of each state party. In view of the conflicting territorial claims in the Arctic, the treaty provides that "the delimitation of search and rescue regions is not related to and shall not prejudice the delimitation of any boundary between States or their sovereignty, sovereign rights or jurisdiction."

The Arctic Search and Rescue Agreement is the first binding agreement negotiated between the use of Arctic under the auspices of the Arctic Council. The treaty reflects the Arctic region's growing economic importance as a result of its improved accessibility due to global warming.

The government of Canada is the depositary for the treaty. It entered into force on 19 January 2013 after it had been ratified by each of the eight signatory states.

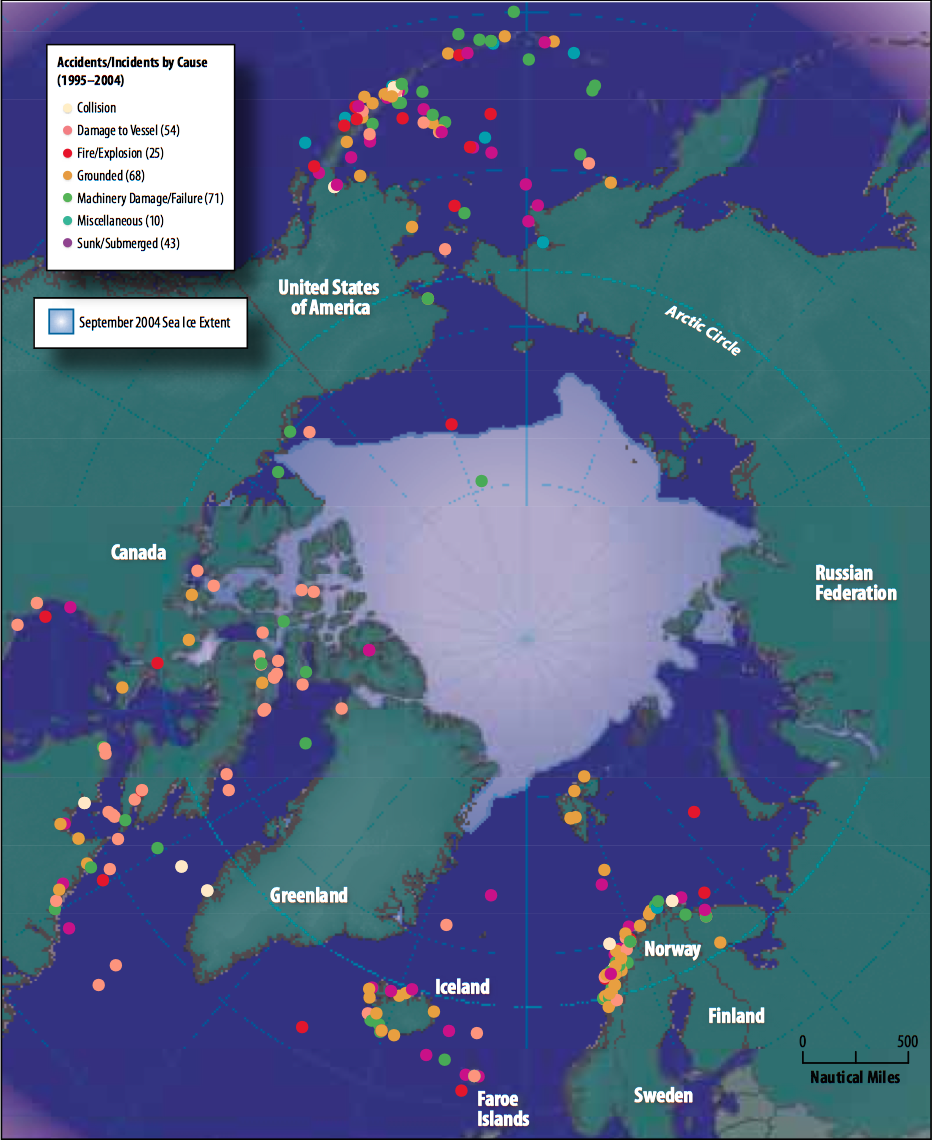
Arctic shipping accidents and incidents causes between 1995 and 2004. The sea ice extent of September 2004 is displayed.

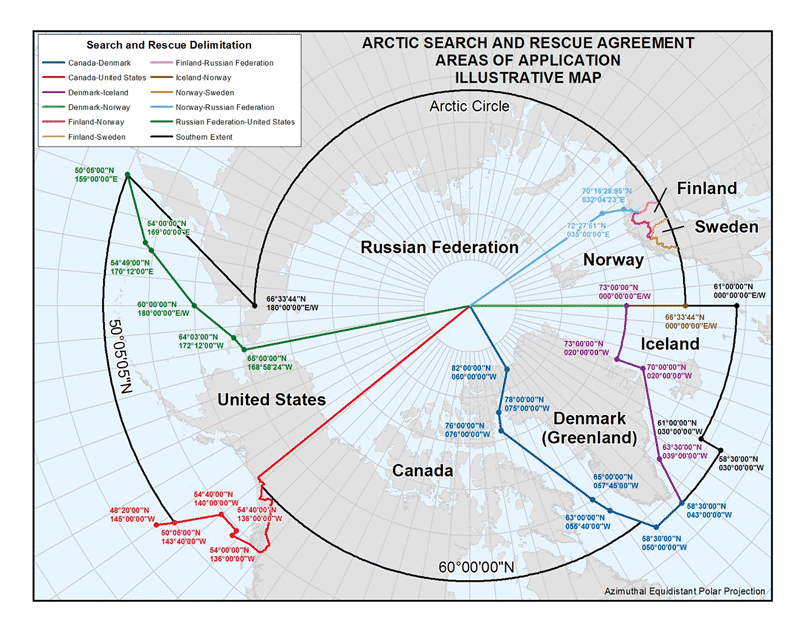
Map of the Arctic search and rescue areas, as agreed in the treaty of 2011

== See also ==
- Arctic Council
- Arctic Climate Impact Assessment (ACIA)
- Arctic Environmental Protection Strategy
- Arctic Cooperation and Politics
- Arctic policy of Canada
