= Murmansk Initiative =

1987 Soviet foreign policy initiative

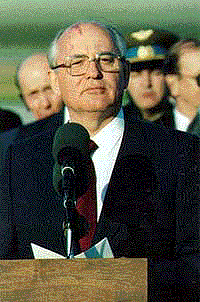
Mikhail Gorbachev spoke of the Murmansk Initiative during a speech in 1987, signifying a change in the Soviet Union's multilateral policies

The Murmansk Initiative (Russian: Мурманские инициати́вы) was a series of wide-range foreign policy proposals concerning the Arctic region made in a speech by the Soviet Union leader Mikhail Gorbachev on October 1, 1987 in Murmansk, Soviet Union, considered to be a trademark of his foreign policy.

The initiative tied together economic, environmental, and security issues in the Arctic. Gorbachev's aim was to transform the Arctic Circle from being a military theater to an international zone of peace among the Arctic powers. The initiative was launched as an invitation for disarmament of nuclear weapons and establishment of an East-West dialogue around the Arctic.

The Murmansk speech's goals paralleled Gorbachev's ambitions in previous speeches, like the one in Vladivostok (July, 1986) dealing with Asia-Pacific relations and a later speech in Belgrade (March, 1988) dealing with problems pertaining to security in the Mediterranean Region.

The Murmansk Initiative was considered a major turning point in the Arctic policy of the Soviet Union (USSR) and represented the application of Gorbachev's "new political thinking" in Northern Europe. It helped guide the foreign policy of the newly-formed Russian government in the Arctic after the dissolution of the Soviet Union in 1991.

== History ==
Before the end of the 1930s, the Arctic had not been considered a zone of particular strategic interest due to its climate and difficulty of access. However, as developments of sea and air technology facilitated access, the Arctic North would open up to become another front in the Second World War. The Soviet invasion of Finland and German invasion of Norway and Denmark marked an unprecedented militarization of the zone, and following the German invasion of the Soviet Union, Murmansk provided Allied supply ships from the United Kingdom, an important avenue through which the Allies supplied the Soviets.

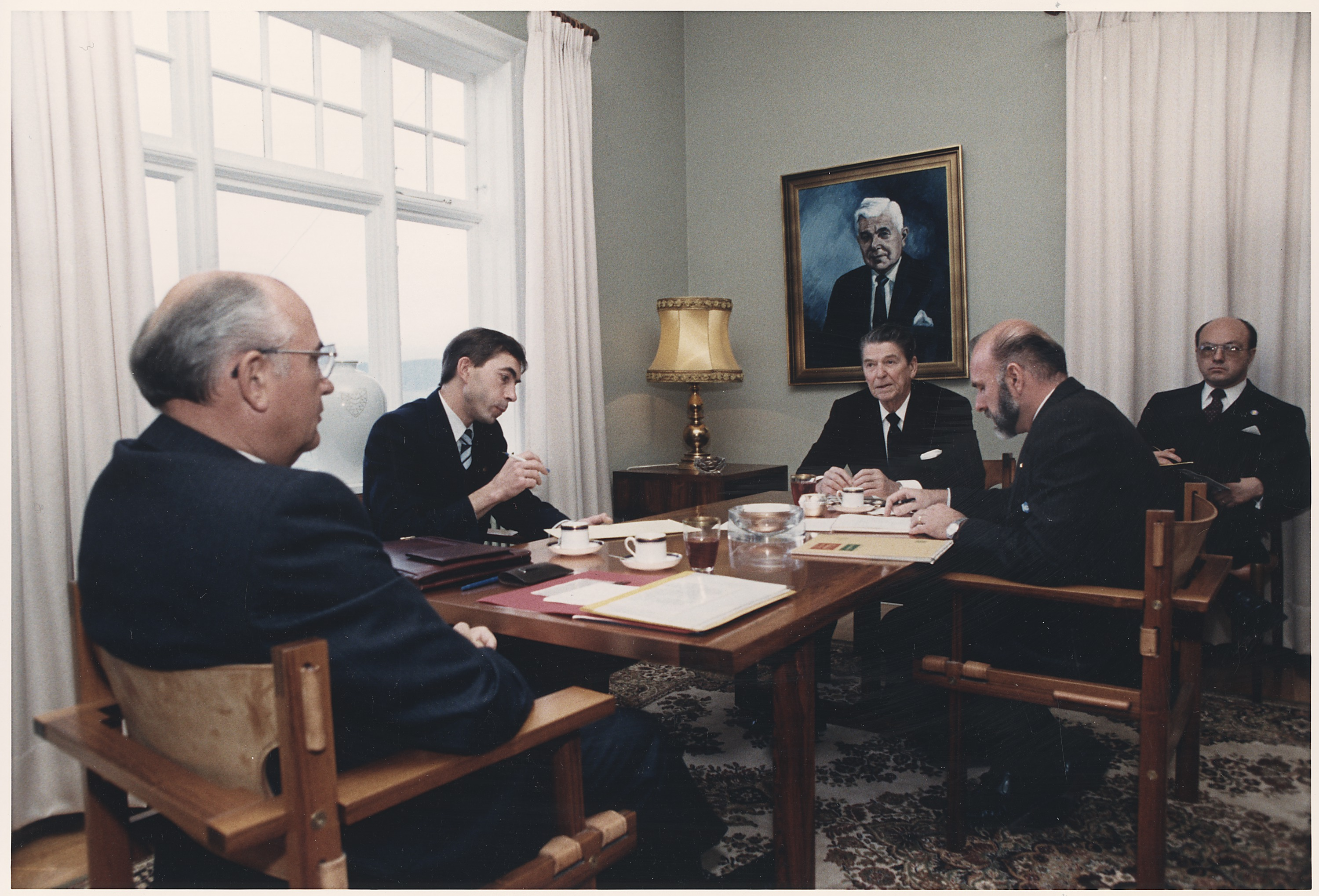
Ronald Reagan and Mikhail Gorbachev during the Reykjavik Summit of 1986

Following the end of the Second World War, improvements in air-power and rising tensions between the United States of America and the Soviet Union further intensified militarization of the Arctic. What had traditionally been a barrier between the two superpowers had become the shortest route between them, and fears of Soviet aerial incursions into North America fostered the creation of the North American Aerospace Defense Command (NORAD) and the Distant Early Warning Line system in the late 1950s. Later tensions over intercontinental ballistic missiles and submarine launched ballistic missiles would lead to the Arctic becoming the principal area of operations for NATO submarines.

For the Soviets, the strategic importance of the Arctic could not be overstated. Murmansk and the Kola Bay would become the home for the bulk of the Soviet submarine fleet, as NATO presence in the Dardanelles limited the capability of their fleet in the Black Sea. The collection of Soviet military installations along the Kola Peninsula would be considered by Western analysts as being the most heavily concentrated system of air, naval, and missile bases in the world. These sites were critical in protecting key military and industrial sites in Northern Russia, including space launch and nuclear testing zones, sites to extract and process oil, natural gas and uranium, and a vast network of early-warning radars to detect any Western incursions into Soviet airspace. This response to the United States and NATO’s nuclear arms races would lead to the Kola Peninsula and surrounding waters to become the most nuclear region in the world, remaining this way until the disarmament initiatives were brought about by the Murmansk speech.

The idea of a nuclear-free Arctic, the first point of Gorbachev’s speech, was not a new one. A formal Soviet proposal had been made in 1958 by then Soviet Premier Nikolai Bulganin, and similar ideas had become popular in the following decades, especially in specific governments and organizations in Nordic countries. Gorbachev had seen these countries as potentially being more responsive to his “new political thinking” and towards the shift toward East-West dialogue, coming off the heels of the Reykjavik Summit of 1986, which Gorbachev would explicitly refer to as a watershed for more peaceful Cold War politics in the Murmansk speech.

== Overview ==
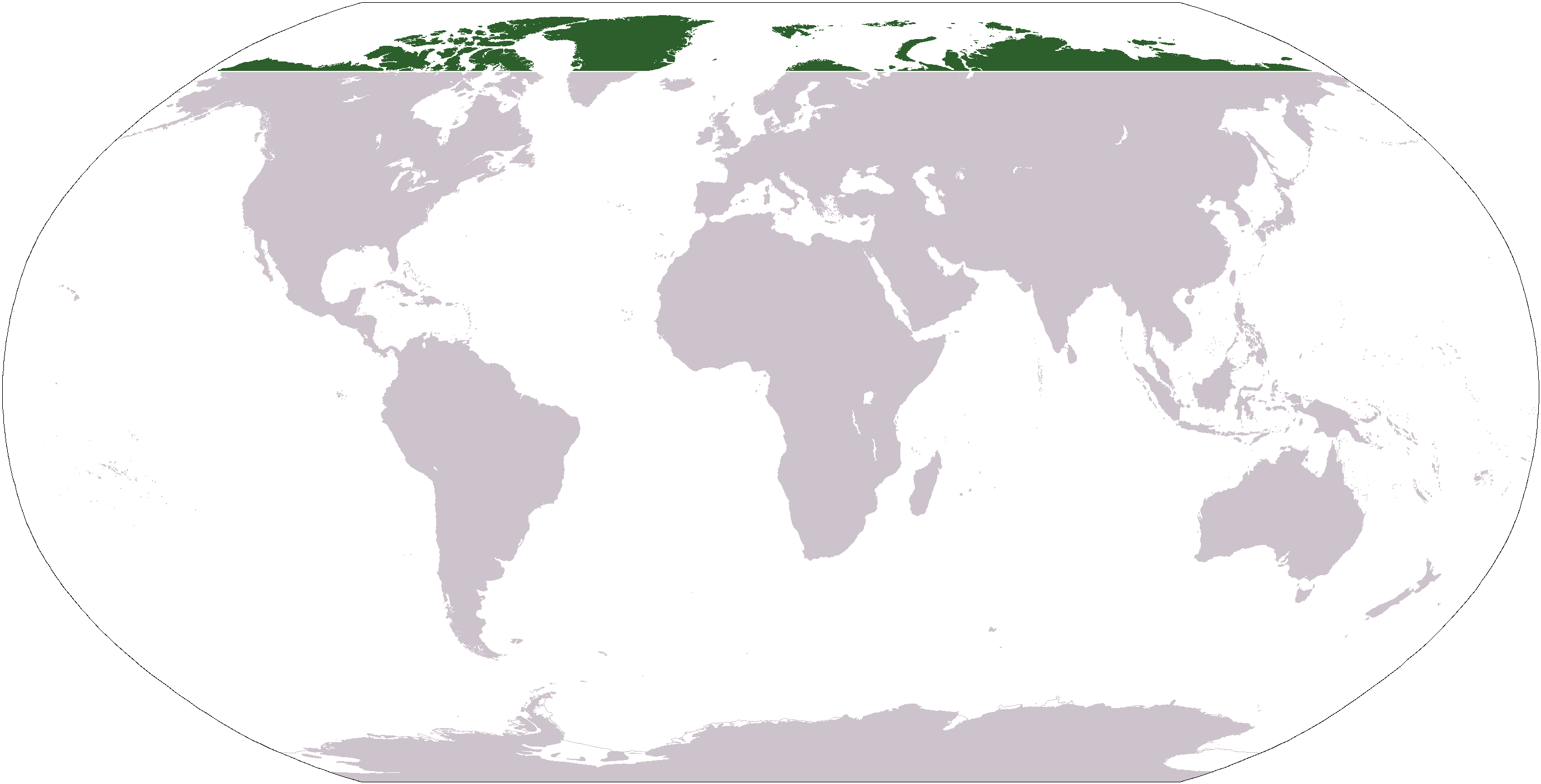
Map indicating the area within the Arctic Circle

On October 1, 1987, Mikhail Gorbachev gave a speech to the city of Murmansk that marked the beginning of a change in foreign policy that would be called the ‘Murmansk Initiative’. In the speech, Gorbachev discussed hopes for nuclear disarmament and more diplomacy with regards to the Arctic. He stated that the Soviet Union's military-industrial complex was a barrier to these peaceful discussions and spoke of the importance of the Arctic as a meeting place of three continents (Europe, Asia, and the Americas) and of ongoing security concerns. His speech invited all those in the Arctic region to engage in discussions about establishing a nuclear-free zone, restricting naval activity, and encouraged peaceful cooperation on topics like resource extraction, scientific exploration, issues of indigenous peoples, environmental protection, and northern shipping routes. The speech had been called the beginning of the end of the Cold War in the Arctic.

=== Proposed nuclear weapons-free zone in the Arctic ===
At the time of Murmansk speech, the world already had achieved nuclear weapons-free zones in South America and Antarctica. Neither areas, however, were of as much strategic importance as the Arctic. Gorbachev offered to act as a ‘guarantor’ for the zone; he would agree to not use or threaten the use of nuclear weapons against other countries in the zone. The topic for a nuclear-free zone was mainly planned to be discussed with the Nordic countries. Norway and Sweden had both expressed interest in such a proposal previously and the Soviets were hoping that dismantling long- and short-range missiles would appease their objections. However, the idea was negatively received in the West overall. Some suggested that the denuclearization proposal was an attempt for the USSR to achieve a strategic advantage, something that the Soviet Union fervently refuted. As a result of the mounting pressure from the United States, no Nordic countries took up negotiations with the Soviet Union on this issue.

This was not the first time that a proposal for a nuclear-free zone was put in place in the region. In fact, it was put forward even earlier by then Finnish President - Urho Kekkonen - in 1963, who pushed for a Nordic nuclear-free zone.

=== Naval restrictions in Arctic Seas ===
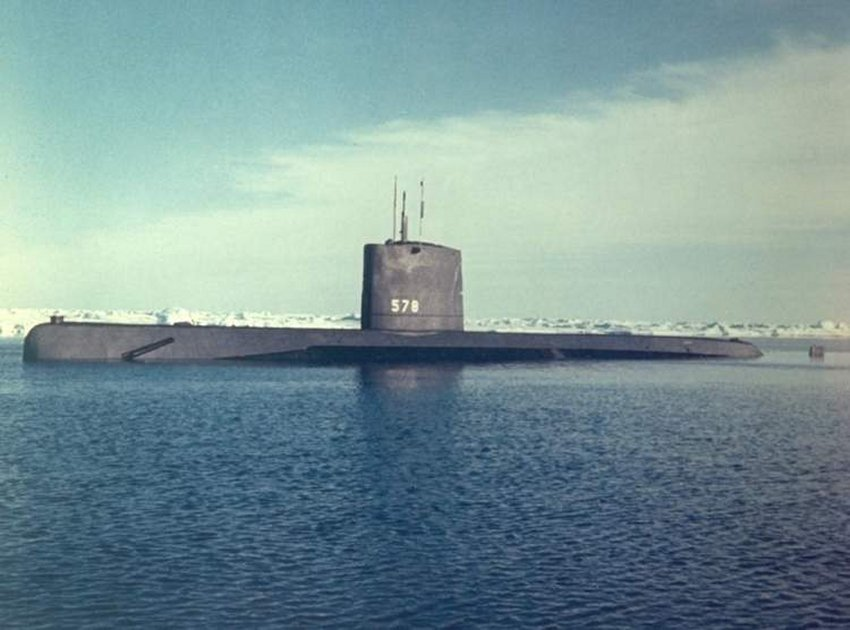
The USS Skate (SSN-578), one of the US Navy's nuclear submarines used in the Arctic during the early 1980s

Mikhail Gorbachev wanted to start relevant consultations on naval restrictions between NATO and the Warsaw Pact. He proposed to hold a meeting in Leningrad to discuss the prohibition of naval activities in mutually agreed zones of international straits and intensive shipping routes in the Arctic. The aim of these discussions was to limit the size and frequency of naval exercises in the European Arctic and to totally ban naval activity in mutually agreed zones, but Gorbachev did not specify the exact location of the zones. It is possible that these initiatives were a response to the US Navy’s Forward Maritime Strategy and its increased submarine presence in the Arctic, allowing the United States to have a sizable advantage in the Arctic in the case of an all out war. There had been no large-scale Soviet exercises since 1985 due to budget constraints, so the proposal would have primarily impacted NATO allies. Thus, the proposal was passed off by the Western countries, believing these naval restrictions would have given the Soviets a unilateral advantage.

=== Resource development ===
Gorbachev saw cooperation on resource development important to the Soviet Union's economic revival. This was part of a larger project to gain Western technology and capital. Gorbachev suggested setting up joint energy projects in the Barents Sea with Canada, Norway and others. The Norwegians rejected the offshore drilling initiative because of territorial disputes.

Gorbachev was also interested in cooperating with Western companies in terms of mineral extraction in the Kola Peninsula. This was a major shift in Soviet foreign policy, however, it did not lead to joint ventures immediately.

=== Scientific exploration ===
Prior to the late 1980s, there was little interaction between the Soviet and Western spheres regarding scientific exploration of the Arctic. Scientists from the Soviet Union were not included in scientific gatherings in Western territory, and any collaboration was plagued with distrust. To change this, Gorbachev in his Murmansk speech proposed an international conference to be held in Murmansk for the purpose of coordination of scientific research in the Arctic region.

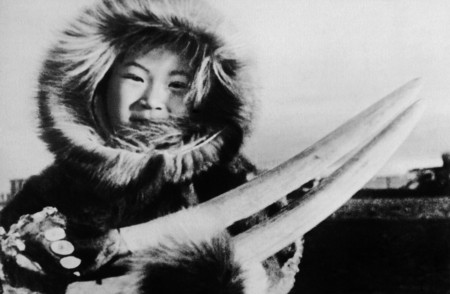
A picture of a Siberian Yupik woman taken during the time of the Russian Empire

=== Indigenous peoples ===
The relationship between Soviet Indigenous peoples and Western indigenous peoples was a delicate issue at this time. There were 26 Indigenous groups with almost 200,000 people living in the Soviet Union, and the industrialization and militarization of the Arctic had a negative impact on their livelihood due to increased pollution. Resource extraction, such as mining and ore processing, disturbed ecosystems which had further consequences on the quality of life for Indigenous people. Prior to the 1980s, the lack of cooperation between the Soviet and Western spheres meant that Indigenous groups in the Soviet Union had not been given the opportunity to shed light on this issue in an international context. The Murmansk initiatives encouraged the Soviet Inuit to attend the 1989 International Circumpolar Conference meeting, providing an opportunity to bring attention to these issues.

=== Environmental protection ===
Prior to the Murmansk Initiative, the Soviet Union had a reputation for either ignoring environmental degradation or pursuing isolationist policies. They were not in the practice of pursuing or encouraging international environmental cooperation. Thus Gorbachev’s proposal to increase international environmental cooperation in terms of developing a joint plan for the protection of the Arctic's vulnerable environment, including the monitoring of radiation, departed from the USSR's previous policy decisions.

=== Northern sea route ===
Mikhail Gorbachev, on the dependence on the normalization of international relations, promised to open the Northern Sea Route for the passage of foreign vessels with the help of Soviet icebreakers. The Northeast Passage acts as a link between the Atlantic and Pacific Oceans, and was seen by the Soviet Union as a crucial strategic and military area. However, as the shortest sailing distance between Northwestern Europe and Northeast Asia, it also had ample potential to provide trade and economic security. Cold War-era arguments which favored a military focus over commercial traffic were increasingly irrelevant given a new Soviet security sphere, and this contributed to the push for the opening of the Northern Sea Route.

== Reception ==
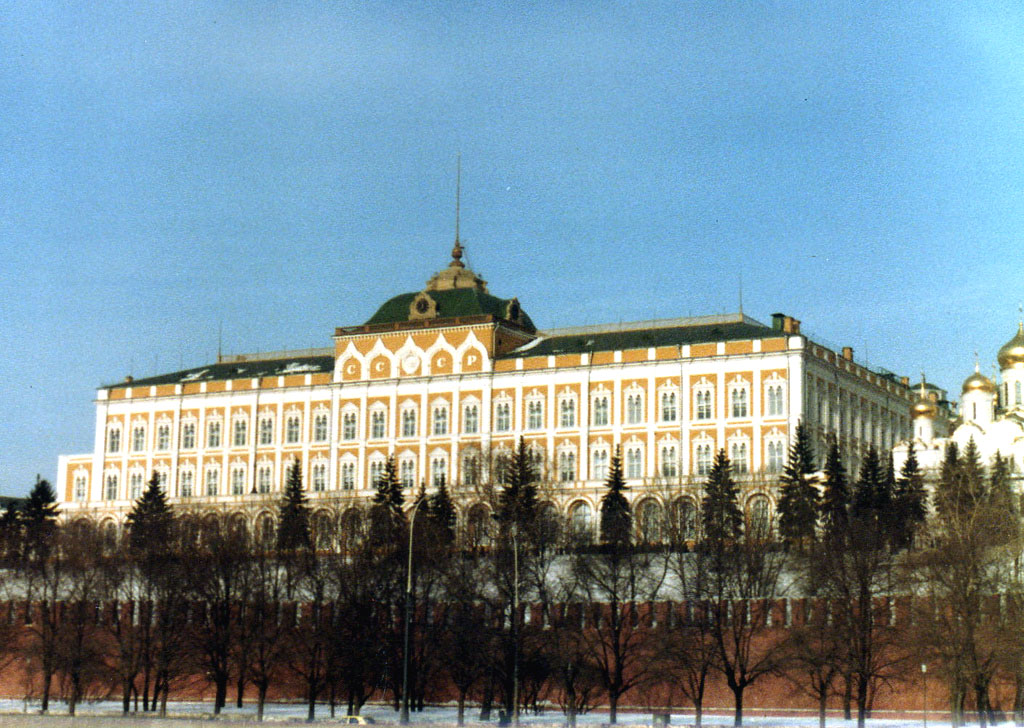
Grand Kremlin Place, the meeting place of the CPSU

The Murmansk Initiative was heard and received positively throughout the world. It led to a restoring confidence in diplomatic negotiations in the European North which were lost during the Cold War, and laid the foundation for a fundamentally new arena for cooperation.

Domestically, after Gorbachev's speech, the Central Committee on the Communist Party of the Soviet Union (CPSU) adopted Resolution 338 in 1988 titled "On Measures to Accelerate Economic and Social Development of the Murmansk Oblast from 1988-1990 to 2005." The resolution helped to boost Murmansk on the world stage in terms of authorizing new contacts through Sister Cities International and, more locally, allowing the city and its surrounding Oblast to become more involved in discussions involving other Nordic counties in the Cap of the North.

However, Resolution 338 itself was not fully implemented due to a lack of finances and the growing disorganization of the USSR's national economy.

== Outcome ==
Gorbachev’s speech in 1987 sparked the beginning of various reforms intended to achieve the goal of increased cooperation and stability in the Arctic. Although there were no significant reductions in the military sector, other sectors saw reduced tensions and even cooperation in certain ventures.

=== Demilitarization ===
Limited demilitarization occurred in the Arctic in the aftermath of the Murmansk Initiative. Many of the demilitarization offers made by the USSR were considered negligible by Western observers. There were three main parts to Gorbachev's proposal for demilitarization: denuclearization, naval arms limitations, and confidence-building measures. The denuclearization initiatives were mostly unsuccessful because of Western suspicions towards the intentions of the USSR and the unwillingness for both the United States and USSR to withdraw nuclear submarines from the region. In a similar manner, Western states considered a naval-arms treaty too advantageous to the USSR to be worth practical consideration. The confidence-building measures were also mostly rejected due to the Nordic countries already establishing a process for such measures.

Despite this, there were some positive demilitarization results that Gorbachev attributed to the Murmansk Initiative: the signing of the INF Treaty, the removal of INFs from areas adjacent to the European North, the elimination of sea-based nuclear missiles in the Baltic Sea, and the reduction in the number of ground troops stationed in both the European part of the USSR as well as in the Warsaw Pact countries by 200,000.

=== International relations ===
Current map of the member states and observer states of the Arctic Council

Relations between the states involved in the Arctic normalized following the Murmansk Initiative. Western states like Norway and Finland were cautiously optimistic about the proposals made by Gorbachev. In fact, Norway and the USSR signed a joint agreement on June 5, 1991, in which they agreed on paying special attention on developing versatile and mutually beneficial cooperation in the Arctic. The non-security proposals put forward by Gorbachev were received relatively enthusiastically and cooperation over development of the Arctic increased, particularly in regards to economic development.

After the collapse of the Soviet Union, the newly-formed Russian government co-founded the Council of the Baltic Sea States (1992), the Barents Euro-Arctic Council (1993), and later, the Arctic Council (1996). All intergovernmental organizations were created for the purpose of establishing multilateral cooperation on issues in their respective regions. Russia's participation in these organizations traced a continuity in its foreign policy development course that Mikhail Gorbachev laid out earlier in his Murmansk Initiative speech.

=== Economic outcomes ===
The Northern Sea shipping route was opened by the Soviet Union on July 1, 1991 to foreign vessels in part as a result of the Murmansk Initiative. Extraction of natural resources like oil and natural gases increased following the Murmansk Initiative due to greater cooperation between the various Arctic states. In particular, the USSR sought to establish a 'special zone' in the Barents Sea that would be open to extraction by the USSR and Norway. While the proposal was initially rejected by Norway, the USSR had established a willingness to cooperate with foreign companies in the sector.

=== Indigenous peoples ===
Gorbachev’s remarks on the need for closer “cultural ties” led to closer interaction between various Northern indigenous groups. Until the late 1980s, indigenous peoples had little recourse to discuss various environmental and economic problems they faced within the USSR. With the Murmansk Initiative, indigenous groups were able to participate in conferences like the Inuit Circumpolar Conference held in Greenland in 1989. The participation of Soviet indigenous groups was symbolically important; however, little progress was made in practically improving their situation.

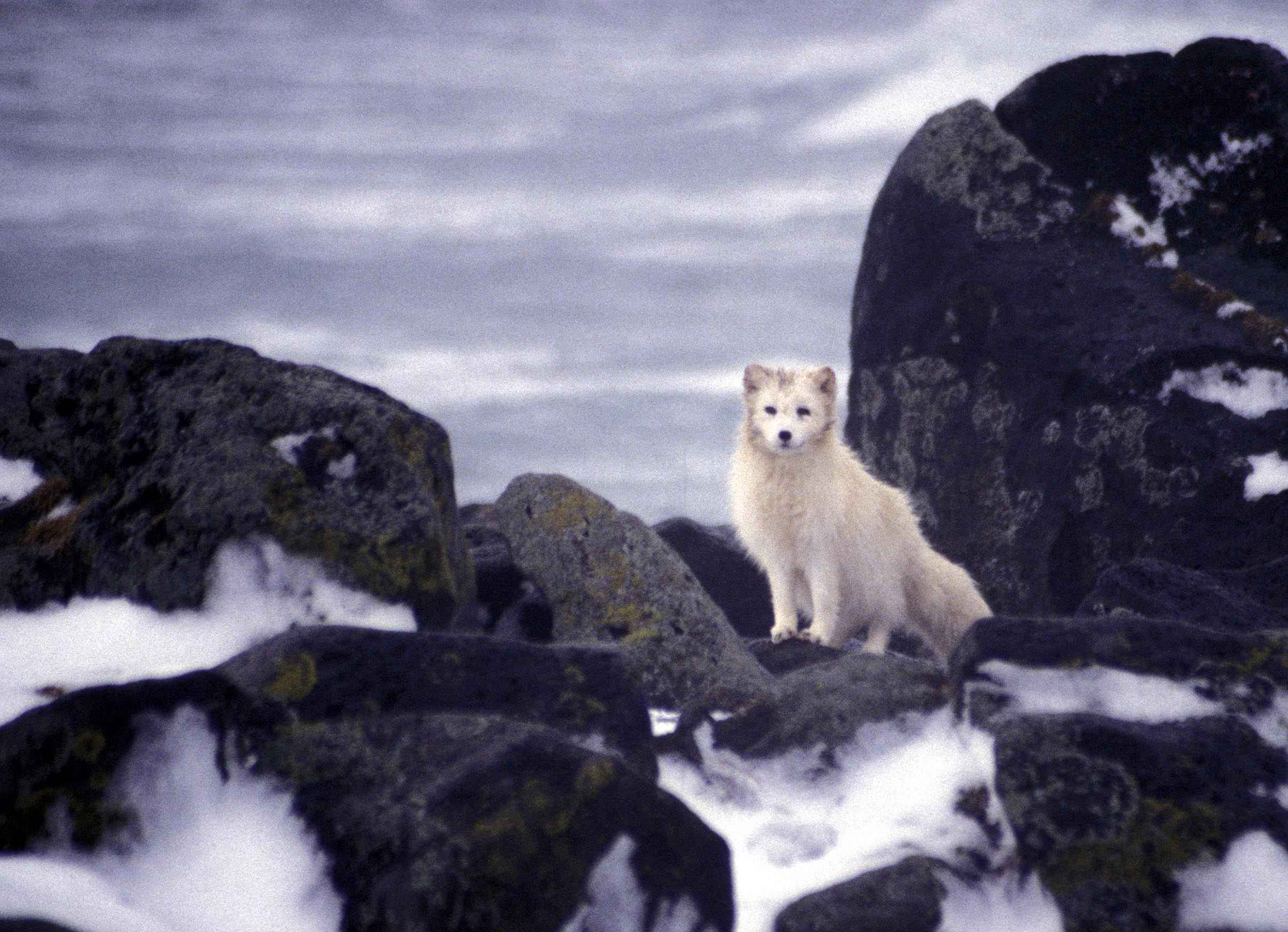
The Arctic fox, a mammal endemic to the Arctic region

=== Scientific initiatives ===
The Murmansk Initiative encouraged further scientific research missions in the Northern Sea and Arctic regions. Gorbachev’s call to action for international cooperation in the Arctic was a catalyst in the International Arctic Science Committee (IASC), a non-profit organization composed of international science groups participating in Arctic science research. In 1988, over 500 delegates from the USSR, Canada, the United States, and the five Nordic states gathered in Leningrad for the Conference of Arctic States on Coordination of Scientific Research in the Arctic. Cooperation began in fields of research there were not sensitive, such as geophysics and biology, and gradually even fields like oceanography and resource development were included. This marked the first time the two spheres had merged to collaborate on such an issue. These initiatives demonstrated the success of Gorbachev’s call to desecuritize the Arctic, and helped to facilitate emerging political cooperation in other areas at the time.

== See also ==
- Perestroika
- Glasnost
- Arctic policy of Russia
- Détente
- Arctic Council
- New political thinking
