= Arctic policy of Sweden =

Foreign relations policy

The Arctic policy of Sweden is Sweden's foreign relations with other Arctic countries, and Sweden's government policies on issues occurring within the geographic boundaries of "the Arctic" or related to the Arctic or its peoples. Since Sweden is itself an Arctic nation, the Arctic Policy of Sweden includes its domestic policies as regards the Swedish Arctic region.

Sweden was Chair of the Arctic Council from 2011 until 2013. During Sweden's chairmanship, the council's key accomplishments included the establishment of the standing Arctic Council Secretariat in Tromsø, Norway, the adoption of the Arctic Council Communication Strategy to communicate the council's work to the public, and the launch of a new website for enhanced resource sharing.

Sweden has asserted that the Arctic Council "should be more active in developing common policies and practical projects" for the benefit of the Arctic region.

Since Sweden is an EU member, (along with Finland and Denmark) the EU Arctic Policy will play a role in the Swedish Arctic strategy.

== See also ==
- Arctic cooperation and politics
- Arctic Council
- Nordic Council
- Nordic model
- Nordic Investment Bank
