= Arctic policy of Finland =

Arctic Policy of Finland is Finland's foreign relations with other Arctic countries, and Finland's government policies on issues occurring within the geographic boundaries of "the Arctic" or related to the Arctic or its peoples. Since Finland is itself an Arctic nation, with roughly one third of its territory existing above the Arctic Circle, the Arctic Policy of Finland includes its domestic policies as regards the Finnish Arctic region. Finland's Strategy for the Arctic Region was released June 4, 2010 and concentrates on seven priorities: security, environment, economy, infrastructure, indigenous peoples, institutions and the European Union.

Diplomatically, Finland was integral in the creation of the Arctic Council and remains an active member. Indeed, Finland will be Chair of the Arctic Council in 2017-18 making for increased emphasis on Arctic policy during that time. Specifically, Finland is calling for making the Arctic Council a more robust treaty-making organization and for hosting a meeting of leaders of the eight Arctic nations during their Chairmanship. Finland has also been involved in the Barents Euro-Arctic Council since its creation in 1993. Finland emphasizes the importance of the Arctic Council as a forum for discussion and decision making and suggests strengthening the council by installing better burden-sharing and a joint budget, establishing a permanent secretariat, expanding the normative role of the council, enhancing interaction with non-Arctic actors and creating a Communications and Outreach Strategy for the council. Finland also offers to host a high-level Arctic Summit to discuss the environmental concerns of natural resource exploitation, the legitimacy of different actors in the Arctic and the future of the Arctic Council.

Finland is also an EU member, one of only three (along with Sweden and Denmark) Arctic nations, which give it a heightened role in the EU's Arctic Policy and similarly, give the EU a significant role in the Finnish Arctic strategy. Finland supports EU admittance as a permanent observer member of the Arctic Council. In recent years, geopolitical tensions with Russia and repeated military intrusions into Finnish airspace have reinvigorated a debate in Finland about cooperation with NATO, and made Finland join NATO as of 2023 .

== See also ==
- Arctic cooperation and politics
- Arctic Council
- Nordic Council
- Nordic model
- Nordic Investment Bank
- ICE Pact
