= Arctic policy of the European Union =

The Arctic policy of the European Union (EU) refers to the EU's approach to foreign relations with Arctic states, as well as its involvement in international and ocean governance frameworks affecting the Arctic region.

The Arctic Region (orthographic projection)

With territories located within the Arctic Circle, Denmark, Sweden, and Finland (EU member states), as well as Norway and Iceland (EEA states), are members of the Arctic Council. The European Union, together with France, Germany, Italy, Poland, the Netherlands, and Spain, participates as an observer. The EU is not a member or the Arctic Council (AC) nor the International Maritime Organization (IMO). However, it engages in Arctic governance through regulatory measures, research funding, trade relations with Arctic states, and participation in regional and multilateral cooperation frameworks that impact the region. Among these, the EU is a party to the United Nations Convention on the Law of the Sea (UNCLOS) and the United Nations Framework Convention on Climate Change (UNFCCC).

Long underemphasized, the EU's interest in the Arctic has become increasingly visible over the past two decades. The EU was traditionally engaged in the areas of climate change mitigation, biodiversity and conservation, oil and gas exploitation, fisheries, tourism, and shipping. Since 2008, it has developed its Arctic policy mainly through a series of European Commission communications outlining its priorities and approach to the region. It has been updated in 2012, 2016, and 2021 (the latter three as Joint Communications between the Commission and the High Representative). The EU's Arctic policy is expressed through Joint Communications, which set out policy priorities and general directions for EU action in the region. Instead of forming a single, comprehensive strategy, the policy brings together and coordinates existing EU policies as they relate to the Arctic.

== Reasons for EU engagement in the Arctic ==
The Arctic is warming around three times faster than the global average, leading to widespread ice loss and thawing permafrost. These changes increase the risk of greenhouse gas releases, extreme weather events, biodiversity loss, and damage to ecosystems, infrastructure, and local livelihoods. Environmental changes also have wide effects on the EU, including rising sea levels, coastal flooding, and altered weather patterns that affect agriculture and fisheries. EU engagement in Arctic governance was therefore largely driven by environmental concerns, which have been a central element of the EU's Arctic policy since its inception, and by engagement with multilateral forums such as the Arctic Council and the Barents Euro-Arctic Council. In the latest 2021 Arctic policy document, climate change is still framed as “the most comprehensive threat the Arctic is facing”.

As Arctic sea ice continues to decline, new possibilities are emerging for shipping in Arctic waters. Although these routes are still used on a limited scale, two of them are of particular interest to the European Union: the Northern Sea Route (NSR), which follows the Russian Arctic coastline, and the Northwest Passage (NWP), a maritime route linking the Atlantic and Pacific Oceans through the Canadian Arctic. For the EU, these routes are of interest because they could shorten shipping distances between Europe and Asia, offering additional options for global maritime transport. More broadly, discussions about Arctic shipping are connected to the EU's wider interests in the region, including access to natural resources, energy security, and environmental protection.

The first Commission Communications and other EU documents primarily framed the Arctic mainly through multilateral cooperation in areas such as climate change, trade and economic development, rather than military competition or security confrontation. In recent years, however, security-related concerns have become increasingly prominent in the EU's approach to the region. The high degree of international cooperation in the Arctic that emerged after the Cold War is seemingly diminishing as the region is gaining growing strategic importance. In the 2022 Strategic Compass for Security and Defence report, the European External Action Service (EEAS) notes the return of power politics in the rapidly changing Arctic region, “due to the impact of global warming, geopolitical rivalries and increased commercial interest, including on natural resources”, emphasizing maritime security as key for “economic development, free trade, transport and energy security.”

A notable development has been the deterioration of relations between Russia and Western states, particularly within NATO, especially as Northern Europe became almost entirely a NATO region following the accession of Finland and Sweden in 2023. Russia sees the Arctic as a vital space for both its security, through the presence of its Northern Fleet, and its economic strategy, particularly through energy extraction and Arctic shipping routes such as the Northern Sea Route. According to the EU, the “military build-up across the Russian Arctic” is a security challenge.

== History of Europe in the Arctic ==
=== European Colonialism ===
A long-standing history connects Europe and the Arctic. Norse settlers first arrived in Greenland in the late 10th century, where the Thule people already lived, establishing the first European settlements in the region, which lasted until the 15th century. After their departure, Greenland was inhabited solely by indigenous populations until European interest returned in the 16th and 17th centuries, mainly through whaling and trade. In the early modern period, Greenland was contested as either Danish–Norwegian territory or terra nullius, largely disregarding Indigenous presence. Denmark–Norway formally established colonial control in 1721 with the arrival of the missionary Hans Egede, marking the beginning of sustained Danish colonization. In 1782, Denmark formalized control over Greenland through trade regulations that limited contact between Europeans and Inuit populations. Following the Treaty of Kiel in 1814, Greenland came under sole Danish authority, and colonial governance expanded from the 1830s through increased administration, schooling, and assimilation policies. A new legal framework was introduced in 1908, followed by the dissolution of the former regional councils and the establishment of municipal councils in 1911, and economic reforms focused on the fishing industry. In 1953, Greenland was formally incorporated into the Kingdom of Denmark under the Danish Constitution and gained representation in the Danish parliament, and was to establish home rule in 1979.

=== The Cold War ===
During the Cold War, the Arctic was a heavily militarized area of nuclear confrontation between the Soviet Union (USSR) and the United States. It was the shortest flight path for strategic bombers and Intercontinental Ballistic Missiles (ICBMs) and home to radar and missile systems, as well as nuclear submarines. Even during the Cold War, however, the Arctic was not only a zone of strategic rivalry but also an area where pragmatic, issue-specific cooperation persisted, especially in maritime and environmental domains. Denmark, Switzerland, the UK, the Federal Republic of Germany, France, Norway, Sweden, and Spain were among the original signatories of the International Convention for the Regulation of Whaling, which created a framework that allowed “aboriginal subsistence whaling” in the Arctic. The 1973 Agreement on the Conservation of Polar Bears, signed in Oslo, brought together Denmark, Norway, and the other three Arctic Ocean coastal states to mitigate the unregulated killing of polar bears.

In 1987, Mikhail Gorbachev gave a speech in Murmansk that marked a political turning point in Arctic relations. His ‘Murmansk Initiative’ called for a “zone of peace”, with limits on nuclear and naval activities, and greater cooperation on environmental, scientific, and economic issues, including shared use of the Northern Sea Route. More than a foreign policy initiative, the speech presented the Arctic as a shared geographical space linked to the idea of a “Common European home”.

=== Post-Cold War: 1990s-2008 ===
Although power competition has intensified over the last years within the Arctic region (e.g., the unified suspension of cooperation following the Russian invasion of Ukraine), the Post-Cold War Arctic region has been relatively stable in terms of geopolitical struggles and has even constituted an enclave where EU states have been able to cooperate more freely with Russia.

In 1993, the foreign ministers of Denmark, Finland, Iceland, Norway, the Russian Federation, Sweden, and the European Commission gathered in Kirkenes, Norway, emphasizing the importance of cooperation in the Barents Sea region to broader European security. The meeting established the Barents Euro-Arctic Council (BEAC) to promote post-Cold War cooperation, sustainable development, and stability in northern Europe, with a strong focus on environmental protection and the rights of Indigenous peoples. In a speech in 1992, Thorvald Stoltenberg, the then Norwegian Minister of Foreign Affairs, framed the Barents initiative as a way to Europeanize the Arctic as part of a wider EU integration project, given the context of the upcoming EU enlargement of Sweden, Finland, and Norway (which in the end voted not to join). Stoltenberg believed that EU enlargement presented an opportunity for the Nordic countries to make their voice heard within the Brussels decision-making process, highlighting the need for cooperation and security in the Arctic as a necessity for the entire European continent. While the spirit of the speech mirrored Gorbachev's in many regards, Norway emphasized the emerging role of the EU and conditioned cooperation with Russia on democratic and market reforms.

The accession of Finland and Sweden in 1995, along with the establishment of the Arctic Council in 1996, paved the way for the EU to establish itself as a key actor in Arctic governance. In 1997, Finland initiated the Northern Dimension (ND), an EU instrument designed as a framework for cooperation with Russia and to support EU enlargement through regional projects. The Northern Dimension brought regional and sub-regional organisations into implementation. The main organisations involved were the Council of the Baltic Sea States (CBSS), the Barents Euro-Arctic Council, and the Arctic Council (AC).

The Northern Dimension partly covered Arctic areas and increasingly referenced the Arctic Council, including through successive ND Action Plans (2000–2003 and 2004–2006), which added sections on the Arctic and later included Greenland in their geographic scope. In The Second Northern Dimension Action Plan (2004–2006), the Arctic is presented as a remote but strategic region whose harsh climate, fragile environment, and dispersed populations require sustainable development, strong environmental protection, modern infrastructure and digital connectivity, and close international cooperation, with particular attention to Indigenous communities. It framed the Arctic Council mainly as an expert and monitoring forum whose research and reports should inform Northern Dimension work on Arctic environment, pollution, and climate-related research priorities^{[5]}.

In practice, cooperation between the EU and the AC was regularly discussed at a technical level, particularly in Senior Arctic Officials meetings, with participation by European Commission representatives. By the mid-2000s, momentum for EU–Arctic Council cooperation declined, even as EU interest in Arctic issues began to increase, particularly around climate change and Arctic Ocean governance.

== The EU Arctic Policy (2008-2021) ==
The EU Joint Communications are meant to encompass a wide range of areas as well as meet the increased geopolitical and economic relevance of the region. The first such initiative dates to 2008, with the adoption of the first Joint Communication, titled The European Union and the Arctic Region As a geopolitical and economic actor, the EU revisited the region's strategic importance and underscored the need for a coordinated Arctic policy at the level of the entire European Union. EU institutions and policy documents have argued that the increasing accessibility of the Arctic, driven by ice melt and emerging trade routes, has heightened the need for a coordinated EU approach to the region. The EU has sought to maintain its relevance in emerging political, security, and economic domains in the Arctic amid increasing interest from other international actors.

=== Between 2007–2012 ===
The Arctic is becoming more strategically important. The European Union is dedicated to fostering effective Arctic cooperation and aiding with the region's current issues. The European Union is one of the most outspoken supporters of stronger international climate change policies. Three Arctic Council member nations are among its members (possibly four if Iceland joins the European Union). The European Union imports and exports a substantial number of Arctic resources and commodities. As a result, many of the union's policies and legislation affect Arctic stakeholders. The European Union wants to engage more with Arctic partners so that it can better understand their concerns and collaborate on solutions to common problems. It is during this period that thiese objectives with the Arctic policy are developed: protecting and preserving the Arctic in unison with its population, promoting the sustainable use of resources, and international cooperation. As climate change and economic growth in the Arctic area accelerate, the European Union plans to significantly increase its engagement with its Arctic partners in order to jointly face the challenge of environmental protection while assuring the region's long-term prosperity. The Commission and High Representative are proposing to focus further development of the EU's policy towards the Arctic on three key areas: Supporting research and channel knowledge to address the challenges of environmental and climate changes in the Arctic, acting with responsibility to contribute to ensuring economic development in the Arctic is based on sustainable use of resources and environmental expertise, intensifying its constructive engagement and dialogue with the Arctic States, indigenous peoples, and other partners.

=== Between 2012–2016 ===
The Union has had the position of "permanent guest" since 2013, after thirteen years of being given "ad hoc observer" status, which implies it may follow the council's activity like permanent "observers" - yet this is only evidence of discriminatory diplomatic treatment. This is a prestige failure for the European Union considering that three of the Arctic 8 are members of the European Union and two are associate states, and it's all the more incongruent given that the European Union has membership status in other regional and global intergovernmental organizations dealing with Arctic concerns. The Arctic region is a region that almost everyone has identified as a sentinel area for climate change. The European Union was quick to declare climate change a priority of its Arctic strategy, since it was already one of three objectives in the 2016 integrated Arctic policy, along with sustainable development and international collaboration. The joint communication of 2012 was divided into two parts. The two-part document provides a set of building blocks for the EU's increased involvement in the Arctic, as well as an overview of developments and policy actions achieved since the European Commission's initial message in 2008. It also identifies three crucial areas for the EU's future Arctic participation: "knowledge, accountability, and engagement".

=== Between 2016–2022 ===
As the EU High Representative for Foreign Affairs and Security Policy, Josep Borrell, said, updating the Arctic Policy will be part of the European Green Deal, and it is important to consider the level of priority given to the climate issue in relation to other Arctic priorities in the new communication of 2021. The EU's strategy for achieving its goal of zero net greenhouse gas emissions by 2050 is, in other words, strongly reflected in its updated Arctic policy of 2021 as well. It is however evident that the EU sustainability goals can clash with Activestates' goals, potentially opening potential diplomatic disputes of resource extraction vs. preservation

The number of countries interested in the Arctic region has risen dramatically in recent years. This increases the risk of turning the Arctic into a geopolitical battleground, putting the EU's interests at risk. In many places of the Arctic, military action has increased in tandem with rising interest in Arctic resources and transport routes. The EU is dedicated to maintaining a secure, stable, sustainable, and prosperous Arctic, which must remain a low-tension zone characterised by peaceful multilateral cooperation. The EU Council recognised the relevance of environmental concerns and climate change for security and defense in its conclusions on climate and energy diplomacy from January 2018, as well as the necessity for close cooperation with partner nations and international organisations.

The last Arctic strategy document published by the EU was done in October 2021; this communication is called "A stronger EU engagement for a peaceful, sustainable and prosperous Arctic".

The European Union has had three main goals since 2016 with its Arctic policies:

- protecting and preserving the Arctic in unison with its population,
- promoting the sustainable use of resources,
- international cooperation.

The European Union does not have observer status within the Arctic Council. This has previously been blocked by Canada because of European Union import and trade bans on seal products. Lately, Russia has been reluctant to invite the European Union as an observer as well, mainly due to European Union sanctions towards Russia for the 2014 annexation of Crimea. Since the Russian invasion of Ukraine, the European Union has increased the scope of its sanctions to unprecedented levels, possibly making it harder for the EU to be accepted into the Arctic Council as an observer state.

=== Future Developments ===
If Iceland joins the European Union, the EU's Arctic influence will grow, and the EU may win permanent observer status in the Arctic Council. The Northern Dimension of European Union policy, which was founded in the late 1990s, was created to address concerns relating to western Russia as well as to improve overall collaboration between the EU, Iceland, and Norway. Since then, the EU, Iceland, Norway, and Russia have formed a multilateral, equal relationship. The EU aims to update its Arctic Policy in the third quarter of 2026. The three main concerns it mentioned for the next Communication are accelerating climate change, heightened security tensions, and growing competition over resources and trade routes.

== EU Relations with Arctic States and Territories ==
=== Greenland ===
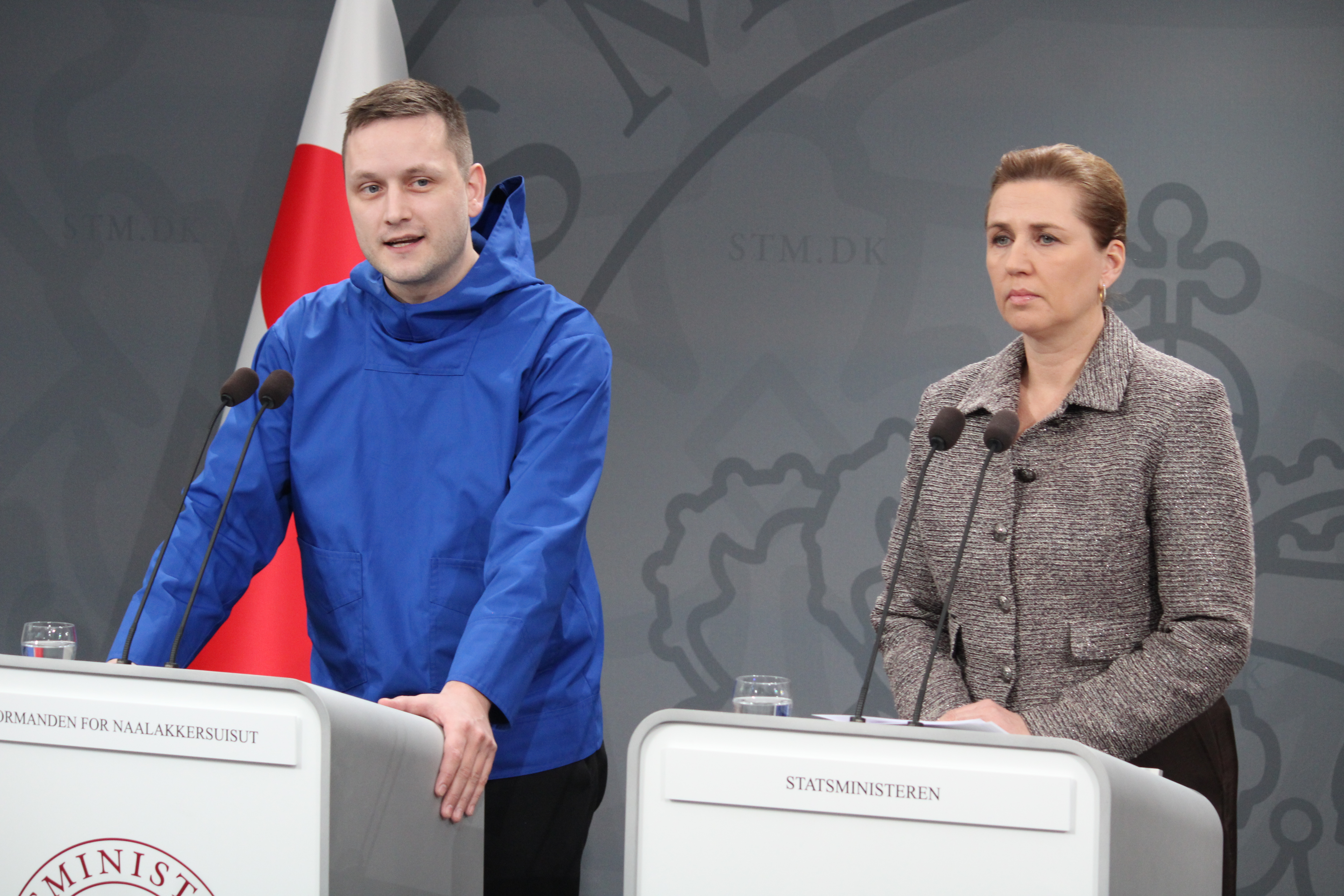
Greenlandic leader Jens Frederik-Nielsen announcing "We choose Denmark" at a January 2026 press conference with Mette Frederiksen in response to Trump's threats to invade or annex the country

Greenland, a constituent territory of the Kingdom of Denmark, is a member of the EU's Overseas Countries and Territories (OCTs) but is not part of the European Single Market nor the Schengen Area. Greenland was part of the European Economic Community until it left in 1985. It has the right to self-govern under the 2009 Act on Greenland Self-Government. EU cooperation with Greenland is governed by Article 198, Part IV of the Treaty on the Functioning of the European Union (TFEU) and by the 2021 Council Decision on the association of the Overseas Countries and Territories, which sets the framework for relations among the EU, Greenland, and Denmark.

The EU was heavily criticized by local communities in Greenland in 2009 when it banned seal products. Greenland's abundance in (largely unexploited) strategic resources needed for the green transition has drawn considerable international attention, particularly from the EU and, more recently, the US. President Donald Trump has expressed multiple times throughout 2025 the need to annex Greenland to the United States. The EU signed a strategic partnership on raw materials value chains with Greenland in 2023, focusing on environmental and social standards, infrastructure development, skills and capacity building, and research. Due to social and climate concerns, the EU has stopped all plans to extract hydrocarbons from Greenland.

The EU's policy framework has been criticized as lacking in protecting indigenous rights in Greenland. In three EU member states (Sweden, Finland, and Denmark through Greenland), indigenous people live within the Arctic. The EU does not have, however, a standalone policy or document protecting the Inuit and Saami people. These indigenous communities are, however, acknowledged in the 2021 EU Arctic policy strategy supported via EU cohesion policy and Interreg programmes.

Since 2024, the EU Commission has opened an office in Nuuk. This initiative is part of the EU effort to support green growth and education, the two priority areas for EU funding programs in Greenland.

=== Norway ===
Norway is not a member state of the EU, but maintains close integration with the EU as a member of the Schengen Area and through the European Economic Area Agreement which has been in force since 1994 and integrates Norway, Iceland and Liechtenstein into the EU single market, ensuring the free movement of goods, services, people and capital, alongside cooperation in areas such as competition, environment, energy, research, education and social policy; in return, Norway contributes financially to EU cohesion through the EEA and Norway Grants. Fisheries cooperation is based on the 1980 EU–Norway Fisheries Agreement and annual arrangements that jointly manage shared stocks and grant reciprocal access to waters, making Norway the EU's largest fish supplier. Fisheries management also divided the two parties: the EU has criticised Norway for setting unilateral quotas above scientific advice for shared stocks such as mackerel and Arctic cod, while Norway argues that EU positions can constrain its rights as a coastal state.

Given the worsening of relations with the Russian Federation in the aftermath of the war in Ukraine, Norway and the EU increasingly converged in the areas of foreign policy, defence, energy, and supply chain cooperation. Norway has become one of the EU's most important providers of energy through oil, gas, and electricity. Norway is rich in minerals, with deposits of rare earth elements, magnesium, titanium, vanadium, and phosphate rock, all of which are included on the European Union's list of Critical Raw Materials. Against this backdrop, the EU–Norway Green Alliance, launched in 2023, seeks to accelerate the green transition by deepening cooperation on clean energy and industrial transformation. This framework has been further operationalised through a Strategic Partnership on sustainable raw materials and battery value chains, aimed at integrating supply chains and reducing the EU's external dependencies in key strategic sectors.

The EU–Norway Security and Defence Partnership, signed in May 2024, deepens long-standing cooperation. Through the EEA, Norway is a member of the European Defence Technological and Industrial Base, participates in the Permanent Structured Cooperation (PESCO), and is involved in the EU's space programs, Galileo and Copernicus. Maritime security is cited as an area of cooperation, promoting international law and secure sea lines, and calling for joint presence in the marine domain.

Norway supports the EU in achieving formal observer status within the Arctic Council. The EU officially claims that Norway belongs to the “European family” and that “Norway's EU membership would be a preferred option in the bloc”.

Svalbard is an archipelago inside the Arctic Circle and Norway's northernmost territory. Norway's sovereignty over the islands was confirmed in 1925 by the Svalbard (Spitsbergen) Treaty, before which Svalbard was a terra nullius with multiple countries operating activities such as hunting, fishing, and mining. While the parties to the treaty affirmed in the preamble “the sovereignty of Norway”, they also expressed the need to establish over the islands “an equitable regime, in order to assure their development and peaceful utilisation”. In light of this, the treaty contains a few restrictions on sovereignty. Articles 2-3 provide equal rights of all parties to fishing, hunting, and access to “the waters, fjords and ports” of Svalbard. Article 9 strictly prohibits any militarization of the archipelago. Svalbard's geographical position confers significant strategic importance. It is close to the Kola Peninsula, which hosts Russia's Northern Fleet, including strategic nuclear submarines. The waters around the archipelago have extensive fish stocks and mineral deposits, and it is positioned along the Northern Sea Route.

== EU formal and informal influence ==
Building on its policy as set out in previous Joint Communications on Arctic matters, and based on the 2016 Global Strategy for the European Union's Foreign and Security Policy and the political priorities of the commission, the EU will strengthen its Arctic engagement through:

- contributing to maintaining peaceful and constructive dialogue and cooperation in a changing geopolitical landscape, to keep the Arctic safe and stable, by raising Arctic matters in its external contacts, intensifying regional cooperation, and developing strategic foresight on emerging security challenges,
- addressing the ecological, social, economic, and political challenges arising because of climate change and taking strong action to tackle climate change and environmental degradation, making the Arctic more resilient, through environmental legislation, concerted action on black carbon and permafrost thaw, and by pushing oil, coal and gas to stay in the ground, including in Arctic regions,
- supporting the inclusive and sustainable development of the Arctic regions to the benefit of its inhabitants and future generations, focusing on the needs of Indigenous Peoples, women and the young, and investing in future-orientated jobs and the blue economy.

The EU has considerable geopolitical, geo-economic, and geo-ecological interests in the Arctic, according to scholars. Cooperation in the fight against climate change, increased maritime activity (new and quicker trade routes), namely the opening of the northern sea route (NSR) and access to new resources all present significant strategic potential, especially extraction of hydrocarbon resources. On the one hand, the EU's participation in the Arctic is characterised by an excessive diversity of sectors and policy goals across issue areas such as fishing, environmental cooperation, etc., and on the other, security challenges and contradictory policy issues pushed by the EU actors in the Arctic Its impact in the North will be determined by its policies as well as the attitudes of other countries, who may or may not welcome the European Union's presence.

== EU actions to establish a physical presence in the Arctic region ==
=== Research in the Arctic ===
The European Union has, since the first Arctic policy of 2008, worked towards legitimizing itself as an actor in the Arctic. However, the EU is not an obvious Arctic actor; this is stated by many academic scholars as well as reflected in the reluctance of the Arctic Council members to incorporate the European Union into the Arctic Council or as an observer state. Another challenge for the European Union is internal cohesion concerning the Arctic, balancing sustainability goals and environmental preservation on the one hand and the possibilities for the extraction of natural resource on the other. The European Union has focused much of its investments in the Arctic on research, using its vast resource to take on a central guiding and coordinating role in Arctic research.

While simultaneously focusing the majority of its resources on the parts of the Arctic region that fall under the EU and its Arctic member states responsibility. These topics include combating climate change, developing alternative energy resources, and strengthening bilateral connections with Arctic littoral states and indigenous peoples. Only one sector, the EU's satellite project Galileo, has provided a clear illustration of EU presence in the Arctic, which the Arctic governments have embraced. As a result, the EU has a chance to strengthen and legitimise its presence in the Arctic by establishing a cooperative Search and Rescue (SAR) regime backed by its Galileo and Sentinel satellites programmes. The satellite programmes could therefore help implement a new Arctic Search and Rescue arrangement and therefore contribute to the EU's goal to build increased monitoring and surveillance capabilities in the Arctic region, further increasing its authority in the region. The satellite programmes could therefore help implement a new Arctic Search and Rescue arrangement and therefore contribute to the EU's goal to build increased monitoring and surveillance capabilities in the Arctic region, further increasing its authority in the region.

== EU developments in the Arctic and possible challenges ==
The academic literature identifies both possibilities and problems that the European Union will encounter in the Arctic. The number of actors who wish to have a say in polar issues is already increasing in the Arctic area. Scholars, on the other hand, believe that a clash between these players is unlikely. These academics conclude that this is due to the region's remoteness, the climate itself and the challenges tied to patrolling and surveillance that all promotes cooperation rather than conflict. However, we have yet to thoroughly assess the dangers of spill -ver effects from the Russian-Ukrainian war, so future collaboration in the Arctic cannot be assumed. Russia and Canada have already expressed reservations about the EU establishing a significant presence in the region. The essential question will be whether the EU is perceived as a positive participant and a useful partner.

== See also ==
- European Neighbourhood Policy
- Arctic Cooperation and Politics
- Northern Sea Route
