= Arctic Environmental Protection Strategy =

1991 adopted multilateral agreement

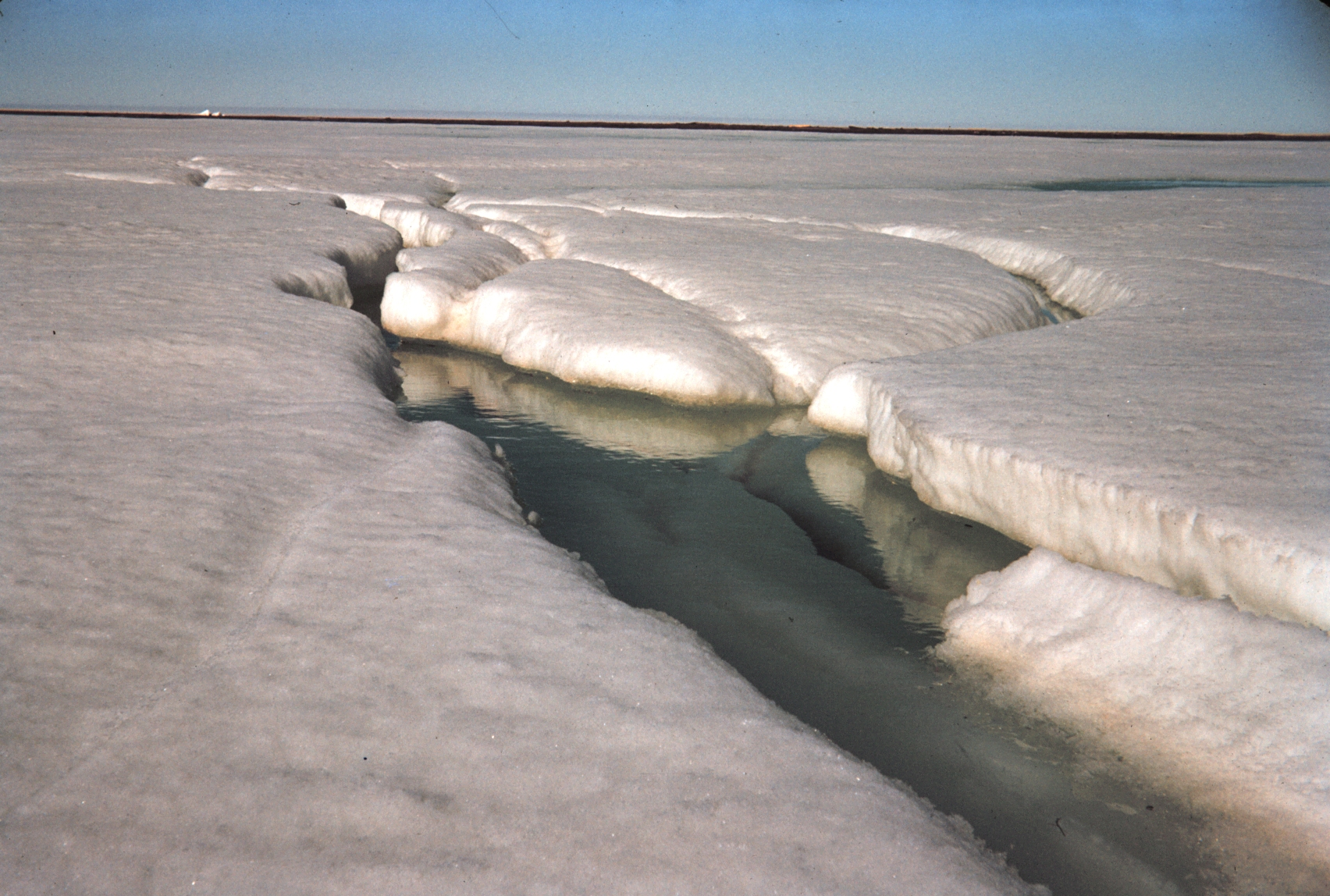
Arctic landscape

The Arctic Environmental Protection Strategy (AEPS) (sometimes referred to as the Finnish Initiative or Rovaniemi Process) is a multilateral, non-binding agreement among Arctic states on environmental protection in the Arctic. Discussions began in 1989, with the AEPS adopted in June 1991 by Canada, Denmark, Finland, Iceland, Norway, Sweden, the Soviet Union, and the United States. The AEPS deals with monitoring, assessment, protection, emergency preparedness/response, and conservation of the Arctic zone. It has been called a major political accomplishment of the post–Cold War era.

== Background ==
In January 1989, Finland sent a letter to the other Arctic states proposing a conference on protection of the Arctic environment. The Rovaniemi Meeting of September 1989 established two working groups. This was followed by the second consultative meeting in Yellowknife, Northwest Territories, Canada in April 1990 where a third ad hoc group was established to develop the strategy. It also resulted in the preparation of a draft document. Kiruna, Sweden was the site of the third meeting, held in January 1991, where one group worked on the drafting the AEPS while another dealt with specific environmental issues.

== Adoption ==
Government officials from all the Arctic nations convened in Rovaniemi in June 1991 for the last consultative meeting. The first three days included meetings, followed by a ministerial-level meeting on 13–14 June observed by representatives from Germany, Poland, the United Kingdom, and the United Nations.

Three indigenous peoples' organizations observed, participated, assisted in developing the strategy, and later became Permanent Participants in the Arctic Council: the Saami Council, the Inuit Circumpolar Conference, and the Association of Indigenous Minorities of the North, Siberia and the Far East of the Russian Federation (RAIPON). They considered the Rovaniemi ministerial meeting to be "historic" as it represented the first time that Arctic indigenous peoples participated in an international declaration's preparation process.

On 14 June 1991, the AEPS and the Declaration on the Protection of the Arctic Environment ("Rovaniemi Declaration") were formally adopted. The main objectives were listed as,

"Preserving environmental quality and natural resources, accommodating environmental protection principals with the needs and traditions of Arctic Native peoples, monitoring environmental conditions, and reducing and eventually eliminating pollution in the Arctic Environment."

== Follow-up ==
The AEPS outlined five objectives and six pollution issues. Legal issues included its jurisdictional reach and extent of obligations for the member states. Data-gathering, information compilation, and assessment tasks were organized around these issues.

In their 1993 follow-up meeting in Nuuk, Greenland, ministers endorsed expanding the AEPS in order to deal with sustainable development, and issued the Nuuk Declaration. Another meeting occurred in 1996 in Ottawa, Canada, resulting in the Ottawa Declaration (1996) and the establishment of the Arctic Council. The last meeting, held in 1997 in Alta following the AEPS's 1996 absorption into the Arctic Council resulted in the Alta Declaration.

The AEPS remains a strategy for the council's working groups, including:

- Arctic Monitoring and Assessment Programme (AMAP)
- Conservation of Arctic Flora and Fauna (CAFF)
- Protection of the Arctic Marine Environment (PAME)
- Emergency, Prevention, Preparedness and Response (EPPR)
- Sustainable Development and Utilization (SDU)

== Criticism ==
Critics of the Arctic Environmental Protection Strategy argue that it:

1. Lacks ongoing political attention and direction, along with financial commitment.
2. Lacks the legal authority of a treaty.
3. Involves studies and talks but lacks concrete action.
4. Does not address specific problems, for example, Arctic haze.

== See also ==
- Arctic cooperation and politics
- Arctic policy of Canada
- Arctic Strategy and Environmental Governance
