= Arctic Climate Impact Assessment =

The Arctic Climate Impact Assessment (ACIA) is a study describing the ongoing climate change in the Arctic and its consequences: rising temperatures, loss of sea ice, unprecedented melting of the Greenland ice sheet, and many impacts on ecosystems, animals, and people. The ACIA is the first comprehensively researched, fully referenced, and independently reviewed evaluation of Arctic climate change and its impacts for the region and for the world. The project was guided by the intergovernmental Arctic Council and the non-governmental International Arctic Science Committee. Three hundred scientists participated in the study over a span of three years.

The 140-page synthesis report Impacts of a Warming Arctic was released in November 2004, and the scientific report later in 2005.

The ACIA Secretariat is located at the International Arctic Research Center at the University of Alaska Fairbanks.

== Subsequent studies ==
AState of the Arctic Report 2006 by the National Oceanic and Atmospheric Administration (NOAA) updated some of the records of the ACIA report. The observations presented in the NOAA report show convincing evidence of a sustained period of warm temperature anomalies in the Arctic, supported by continued reduction in sea ice extent, observed at both the winter maximum and summer minimum, and widespread changes in Arctic vegetation. The warming trend is tempered somewhat by shifts in the spatial patterns of land temperatures and ocean salinity and temperature. While there are still large region to region and multiyear shifts in the Arctic climate, the large spatial extent of recent changes in air temperature, sea ice, and vegetation is greater than observed in the 20th century.

The NOAA report was a review of environmental conditions during the previous five years relative to those in the latter part of the 20th century, conducted by an international group of twenty scientists who developed a consensus on information content and reliability.

As an annual follow-on activity to the 2006 report, the NOAA's Arctic Report Card presents annually updated, peer-reviewed information on recent observations of environmental conditions in the Arctic relative to historical records. The conclusion for 2010 was that a return to previous Arctic conditions is unlikely. This conclusion was supported by the record temperatures across Canadian Arctic and Greenland; a reduced summer sea ice cover; record snow cover decreases; and links to some Northern Hemisphere weather.

In April 2008, the World Wildlife Fund's report, Arctic Climate Impact Science – An Update Since ACIA was launched at the meeting of the Arctic Council. It provided a large, updated review of Arctic climate impact science since the 2005 ACIA.

=== Arctic Biodiversity Assessment ===
The ACIA called for improved capacity to monitor and understand changes in the Arctic and to improve and enhance long-term Arctic biodiversity monitoring. In response to this recommendation, the Arctic Council's Conservation of Arctic Flora & Fauna Working Group(CAFF) began work on the Arctic Biodiversity Assessment. It was completed in 2013.

=== Circumpolar Biodiversity Monitoring Program ===
In further response to the ACIA call for better monitoring, CAFF established the Circumpolar Biodiversity Monitoring Program (CBMP). The CBMP is an international network of scientists, government agencies, Indigenous organizations and conservation groups attempting to unite their efforts to monitor the Arctic's living resources. The CBMP is intended to improve rapid detection, communication, and response with respect to the significant biodiversity-related trends and pressures affecting the circumpolar world.

== See also ==
- Climate change in Canada
- Climate of the Arctic
- Arctic cooperation and politics
