= Arctic policy of the Kingdom of Denmark =

Danish foreign policy

The Arctic Policy of the Kingdom of Denmark defines the Kingdom's (Denmark together with Greenland and the Faroe Islands) foreign relations and policies with other Arctic countries, and the Kingdom's strategy for the Arctic on issues occurring within the geographic boundaries of "the Arctic" or related to the Arctic or its peoples. In order to clearly understand the Danish geopolitical importance of the Arctic, it is necessary to mention Denmark's territorial claims in areas beyond its exclusive EEZ (Exclusive economic zone) in areas around the Faroe Islands and north of Greenland covering parts of the North Pole, which is also claimed by Russia.

== Background ==
Despite having among the largest Arctic territories, Denmark has the smallest Arctic population. The Kingdom of Denmark is an Arctic nation; however, this relies heavily on the importance of the unity of the Realm, where Denmark as a country itself is not an Arctic state whereas the self-governing autonomous countries – Greenland in the Arctic and the Faroe Islands in the North Atlantic – are. Regardless of the different characteristics of Denmark, the Faroe Islands and Greenland, the Kingdom of Denmark has a common interest in addressing the challenges and exploiting the opportunities arising from the Arctic region's rapidly changing conditions and the increasing interest from the outside world in the region. The Danish Kingdom's Arctic policy shapes its relations with other Arctic countries as well as its own policies. Denmark is a member of the Arctic Council, the Nordic Council, the EU, NATO and the International Maritime Organization (IMO), which all have an effect on Denmark's Arctic policy. Despite having a common Arctic policy within the kingdom, Greenland has taken over the area of mineral resources in 2009, where decisions on development, exploration and extraction of mineral resources in Greenland are made by the Greenlandic authorities.

In Denmark, Greenland has been the government's main focus within its Arctic strategy since after the Cold War. A new Danish Arctic Strategy for the period of 2021–2030 is delayed which is partly due to Greenland's intention to develop its own strategy first, which is perceived as a means for Greenland to increase its influence in Danish foreign policy. In the beginning of 2023, Greenland was close to completing its own strategy, which indicates that a new strategy for the Kingdom will be released soon. Denmark's Arctic Strategy and its general interests in the region is in many ways dependent on Greenland's membership in the Kingdom of Denmark, which also is why the Danish government aims to minimize any tensions between Greenland and Denmark.

The Kingdom of Denmark's Arctic policy concerns topics such as environmental issues, military presence, such as the Joint Arctic Command in Nuuk, mineral resources and fisheries in the Faroe Islands.

The Danish government released a new foreign policy and security strategy in May 2023 which underlines the Danish focus on security and geopolitical issues within its Arctic areas.

== Denmark's geopolitical role ==
Denmark uses its resources and niche diplomatic competences in regards to frame themselves as a coherent entity as a Kingdom in order to become a major voice within the Arctic Council with a common voice, which is however constantly challenged, especially by Greenlandic politicians' and civilians' desire to become more sovereign.

As also apparent in other international constellations, the United States remains Denmark's primary and most important ally within the Arctic region. Former Danish Minister of Foreign Affairs, Jeppe Kofod, made that clear in the Danish Foreign Policy Review of 2019. The close cooperation refers to Denmark welcoming the increased interest and activities from United States in Greenland, namely with the overall aim to ensure that the United States presence will bring tangible benefits to the Greenlandic society but also in order to ensure security from interference from non-Arctic actors, Russia or China. However, the aim of securing the Kingdom of Denmark's areas as well as maintaining being a regional actor within the Arctic requires both greater commitment to developing Arctic policies but also enhancing greater cooperation and dialogue within the Kingdom of Denmark with a mutual understanding of the security challenges and shared defense. Here, the former Danish Minister of Defense, Trine Bramsen, put emphasis on the fact that despite close cooperation within the Kingdom, Denmark cannot reach adequate situational awareness in the Arctic alone, whereby closer cooperation between the Arctic allies is needed.

=== Greenland ===
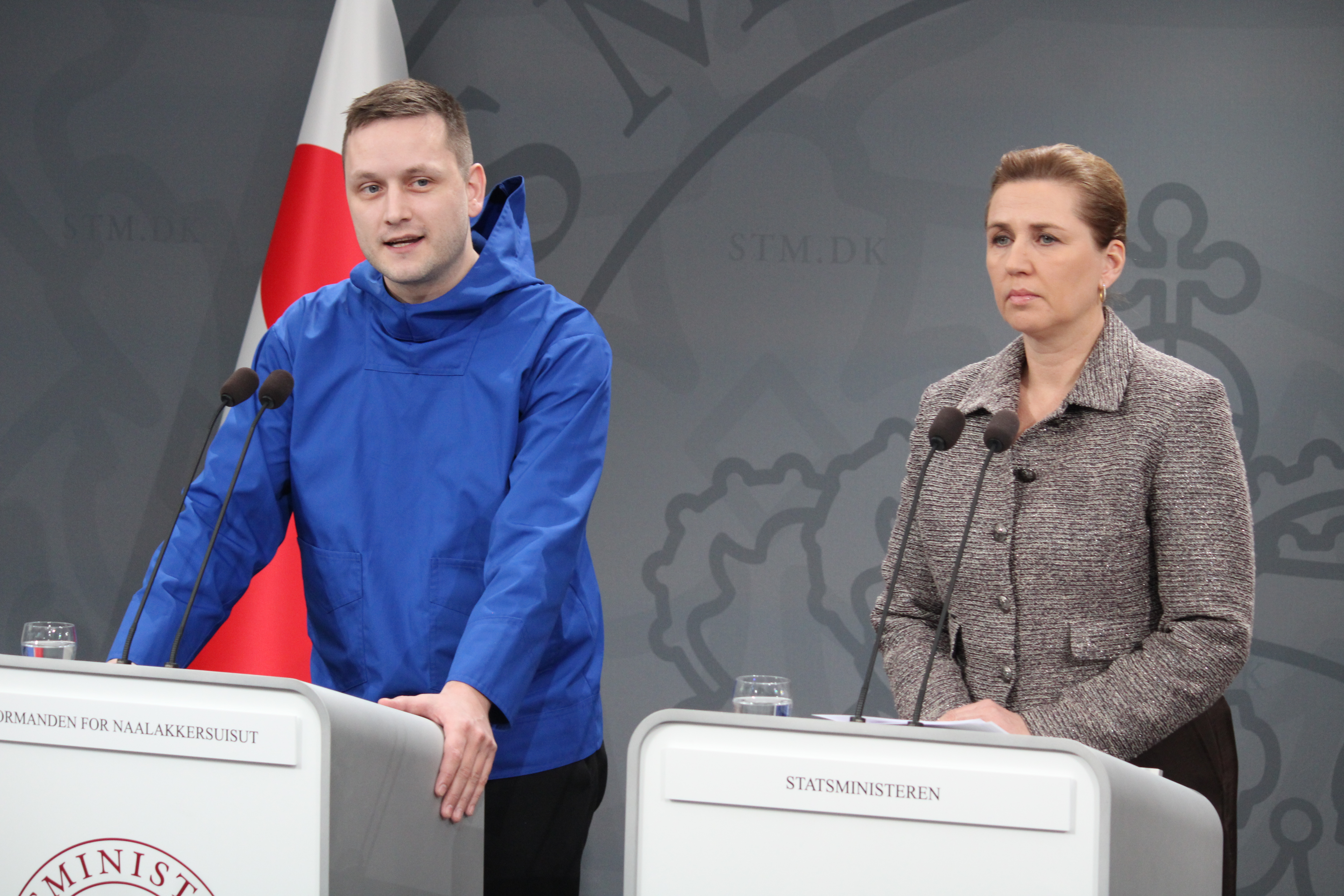
Greenlandic leader Jens Frederik-Nielsen announcing "We choose Denmark" at a January 2026 press conference with Mette Frederiksen in response to Trump's threats to invade or annex the country

Surely, the vision of Denmark as an Arctic superpower will only last as long as the Danish Kingdom can be seen as a unity. Professor Rasmus Gjedssø Bertelsen from the University of Tromsø has pointed out that Denmark has the potential to become the world's first post-Arctic nation but without Greenland, Denmark would lose 98% of its landmass and any significance as an Arctic power.

Some scholars have argued that Denmark tries to use Greenland to strengthen its bilateral relationship with the United States, but that Greenland's increased autonomy and the constitutional arrangement within the Kingdom of Denmark have come to shape Danish Arctic policy as well.

=== The Faroe Islands ===
International cooperation on sustainable management of fish stocks in the north has the highest priority for the Faroe Islands, both through multilateral coastal states consultations, bilateral agreements, and regional fisheries management organizations, particularly The North East Atlantic Fisheries Commission (NEAFC) whose convention area extends to the North Pole. The Faroe Islands are seeking independent membership in the NEAFC. The Faroe Islands prioritizes active participation with their associate membership in both the International Maritime Organization (IMO), the United Nations Food and Agriculture Organization (FAO), United Nations Educational, Scientific and Cultural Organization (UNESCO), and the World Health Organization (WHO). In addition to participation in international organizations, it is important for the Faroe Islands to continue and strengthen their relations with the other countries in the Arctic area, particularly Norway, Iceland, Greenland, Denmark, the United States and Canada. It is also important to continuously develop relations with countries with a particular interest in the Arctic area, including the United Kingdom, Scotland, Japan, the Republic of Korea, China, and EU member states, as well as the EU as an organization.

== Danish Arctic policies ==
=== The Illulissat Declaration ===
Denmark ratified the United Nations Convention on the Law of the Sea (UNCLOS) in 2004 and following this submitted documentation for territorial claims north of Greenland among other places in the Arctic. This entailed significant challenges pertaining to national security for Denmark as a rather small state to uphold sovereignty of a vast area. The Norwegian government with Jens Stoltenberg as Prime Minister, NATO's current Secretary General, made the Norwegian 'High North Policy' the main anchor of Norwegian politics as early as 2005, and when Danish Foreign Minister Per Stig Møller invited the other Arctic littoral states, the United States, Canada, Russia and Norway to a summit in Ilulissat, Greenland, in 2008, Danish diplomacy gained both honor and useful experience. This was because the five states – also known as the Arctic Five – confirmed their peaceful intentions in the Arctic and established their own special rights in the region at this summit. The Ilulissat Declaration from 2008 is a document signifying necessary joint regional efforts and responsibilities in response to the potentially adverse effects of climate change with regard to the melting Arctic ice pack and it has played an important role in recent Danish Arctic policy. The Ilulissat Declaration contains a regional maritime governance perspective, since it was crucial for the Arctic Five and was seen by many as a response to Russian explorers planting the Russian flag at the bottom of the seabed of the Arctic Ocean in 2007. The Declaration specifies that cooperation should include search and rescue capabilities, protection, preservation and collection of scientific data. The cooperation between the Arctic Five already took place before the Declaration, so the declaration was merely expected to act as a reassertion of the roles and responsibilities which needed to be taken seriously.

The declaration ultimately has helped Denmark to maneuver as a small state in the Arctic as well as within the Arctic Eight and the Arctic Council, since Denmark took over the chairmanship in the Arctic Council in 2009 after the declaration with aims aligning very much with the content of the Illulissat Declaration. In addition, the declaration marked an "Arctic turn" according to scholars such as Larsen (2021), because after 2008 the Arctic has increasingly been considered an important arena for regional diplomacy in which Denmark should be fully engaged. Previously, Danish foreign policy towards the Arctic had almost only concerned the relatively limited military defense of Greenland and the bilateral relationship with the United States.

All things considered, the larger focus on Arctic Policy post 2009 has been somewhat surprising, since it was a standard practice for Danish Prime Ministers to downplay Greenland's importance to Denmark after the Cold War. In addition, former Danish Prime Minister H. C. Hansen signed a secret agreement in 1957 that gave the United States access to store nuclear weapons at Pituffik Space Base in Greenland (formerly Thule Air Base), and there has generally been a geopolitical element in Denmark's interests in Greenland, which successive governments have chosen to nurture without too much publicity.

=== Sovereignty over Hans Island ===
As a demonstration of the capacity to find peaceful resolutions in line with the principles of the Ilulissat Declaration, a joint working group was established by the Danish Ministry for Foreign Affairs in collaboration with the governments of Greenland and Canada. This initiative took place following the Ilulissat Summit with the aim of providing recommendations to address outstanding border issues between the two countries. These issues encompassed matters of sovereignty regarding Tartupaluk (Hans Island) and the maritime delimitation of the waters between Greenland and Canada. Building upon the outcomes of this collaborative effort, Canada, the Kingdom of Denmark, and Greenland signed a comprehensive boundary agreement on June 14, 2022. This agreement effectively resolves the sovereignty dispute over Tartupaluk and establishes a land border between Greenland and Canada on the island. Additionally, it establishes the maritime boundary within both the 200 nautical miles zone and beyond, spanning a distance of 3,962 km, from the Lincoln Sea in the north to the Labrador Sea in the south. This newly defined and modernized maritime boundary stands as the world's longest maritime boundary.

=== Arctic policy 2011–2020 ===
In August 2011, the Kingdom of Denmark published its strategy for the Arctic for the period 2011–2020. Concurrently, the Joint Arctic Command was established, consolidating the North Atlantic defense structure in Nuuk. Through this, Denmark formulated a strategy for present and future activities in the Arctic region, emphasizing close cooperation with other coastal states in the Arctic. The strategy was built upon the premise that common solutions can be negotiated based on the UN Convention on the Law of the Sea, international treaties, and judgments of the International Court of Justice.

However, the historical context of the Arctic reveals that ambitions and intentions alone are insufficient. The 1933 ruling by the International Court of Justice in The Hague regarding East Greenland exemplifies this fact. The ruling was effectively influenced by the presence of privately funded Danish expeditions in the area, predating the Kingdom of Denmark's official interest. Without these prior activities, there was a genuine possibility that Norway could have legitimately asserted its claim over the territory. The support of the United States, though not crucial, also played a role in Denmark's favor. In essence, East Greenland came under the jurisdiction of the Kingdom of Denmark due to the initiative of individuals who privately financed exploration in the region. Although the ruling is nearly 70 years old, it remains relevant within the context of the Arctic strategy. The strategy provides only broad guidelines on the allocation of resources. The East Greenland ruling demonstrated the interconnection between will and resources, even when resolving agreements and disputes. In a modern context, this signifies the necessity of having the determination to claim and explore territories considered part of |the Kingdom, along with the availability of resources, including financial and other capacities, to implement such ambitions. According to critics, this Arctic strategy acknowledges its ambitions but assumes that they can be largely accomplished without the need for additional resource allocations.

=== Danish Defence Settlement Agreement 2018–2023 ===
Upholding sovereignty in the arena is among the top priorities of the Danish Defence. This entails some degree of military presence by the Danish Defence, which includes the Joint Arctic Command in Nuuk, the Pituffik Space Base in northwestern Greenland, and Station Nord, the world's most northern military base.

The most recent Danish Defence Settlement Agreement 2018–2023 has prioritized the following initiatives dedicated to the Arctic: augmented surveillance, command, control, communication, and operational efforts is continued and increased as 1.5 billion DKK is earmarked for strengthening the Danish Defense in the Arctic. Furthermore, a total of 235 million DKK will be allocated through the Defence Agreement to the following additional initiatives:

- Equipment to prevent pollution in the waters around Greenland.
- Focus on different education methods. The important issues are now civil preparedness and contingency education, as well as other projects such as the Greenland Guard.
- Initial conscription enrollment assessments to be carried out in Greenland for volunteers who want to sign up for national service.
- Subsidized travel schemes for Greenlandic conscripts to travel home.
- More apprentice positions for secondary school students to be established in connection to Armed Forces units.
- A contribution to the mapping of the ice chart north of 62°N and to the new land mapping of Greenland.

The Danish Ministry of Defence will finance the operational costs of the radio room at the maritime emergency radio in Greenland.

=== Danish Foreign and Security Policy Strategy 2022 ===
While the threat posed by Russia – as put forward in the strategy – primarily revolves around its military capabilities, China's involvement in the Arctic is viewed more as a political challenge. The strategy is concise in addressing this aspect, but past events indicate that the main concerns lie in Chinese interests concerning Greenland's extensive airport project, mining potential, and research initiatives that may have military strategic elements. This poses a significant issue, particularly for the United States, who aims to maintain a certain distance from its global rival in relation to the North American continent, where Greenland is geographically located.

Denmark considers the United States as its closest ally in terms of security policy, both in the Arctic and overall. Moreover, the strategy's characterization of Russia and China resembles an American standpoint, highlighting who ultimately shapes the direction of policy. In accordance with this course, Denmark has augmented its military budget by approximately US$235 million with an "Arctic capacity package" aimed at reinforcing sovereignty and bolstering surveillance in the Arctic region.

=== Other policies ===
The Danish Minister for Foreign Affairs, Lars Løkke Rasmussen, released the Danish government's new foreign policy and security strategy on May 16, 2023, in which the Arctic plays a large role. The Arctic region and nearby areas, such as the Baltic Sea, house significant critical infrastructures that are increasingly susceptible to attacks. Examples of this vulnerability occurred in 2022 when an undersea communication cable leading to Svalbard was deliberately severed, as well as the 2022 Nord Stream pipeline sabotage. The first incident was believed to be an act of sabotage, while the second was known to be one.

Among other things, Denmark's strategy says that European and Danish defence must be strengthened, and that the latter must be allocated 2% of Denmark's BNP by 2030 because Russia's aggression in Ukraine requires further development of NATO to better deter Russia in the Baltic and Baltic Sea region, Eastern Europe, the Arctic and the North Atlantic. Furthermore, it states that the war in Ukraine makes Russia a more unpredictable actor. In addition, cooperation in the Arctic Council is uninterrupted for now. Russia has major interests in the Arctic, but China has long-term interests in the region. The strategy put emphasis on the fact that with Finland and Sweden in NATO, the Arctic will become a safer place for Denmark, but active efforts must be made to maintain low voltage in the Arctic and that this must be ensured in cooperation with the governments of Greenland and the Faroe Islands.

On May 30, 2023, the Danish Acting Minister for Defence, Troels Lund Poulsen, will announce the government's proposal for a new Defence Agreement, which will focus on strengthening the ties within the Danish Kingdom.

== Denmark's diplomatic role ==
Denmark is a member of multiple regional and transnational councils and networks concerned with the Arctic region. As a small state, it is central for Denmark to work together with international partners to actively collaborate in keeping the Arctic peaceful and avoid military tension in the area. A vital element of Danish involvement in the Arctic is thus diplomacy, which necessitates an active approach within the various councils.

=== Bilateral cooperation within the Danish Kingdom ===
Greenland and the Faroe Islands have been colonized by several different powers but were under Danish rule by 1814 despite some protest from Norway among others. However, the Faroe Islands were granted home rule by the Danish parliament in 1949 and Greenland in 1979. The Danish constitution from 1953 gives Denmark certain prerogatives, for instance in foreign and security policy, that have potentially far-reaching consequences for Greenlandic and Faroese autonomy, which establishes a hierarchical relationship. Formally, the Danish Constitution's Section 19 states that "The King shall act on behalf of the Realm in international affairs", which means that it is the Danish government that acts on behalf of the Kingdom in international affairs. The overall responsibility for the Kingdom's foreign and security policy is thereby anchored in the Constitution, and the Danish government maintains that it is impossible to transfer full autonomy in foreign and security policy to the Greenlandic government. This also means that the Danish government maintains the right to overrule areas under Greenlandic and Faroese sovereignty by proclaiming that certain cases fall under foreign, security or defense policy and thereby is an area where Denmark has sovereignty. In addition, even after Greenland achieved self-rule in 2009, the country struggles to obtain more self-determination in terms of their own foreign policy which relates to having their own Arctic policy.

Greenland suffers from previous disease patterns such as high child mortality rates, acute and chronic infectious diseases such as tuberculosis as well as a new, western disease pattern relating to lifestyle diseases. As such, the Kingdom approaches health and social sustainability from a collaborative perspective to draw on new technological opportunities and knowledge within the Nordic region and new partners in the rest of the Arctic. This is also related to societal issues where Greenland works together with the Canadian Nunavut region while the Nordic Council of Ministers have a distinct focus on gender issues.

The Faroe Islands have been an active partner in Arctic cooperation since it started as an environmental association partner in the early 1990s. Around 2009, the Faroese Government began to reconsider their political stance and place in the debate regarding the Arctic, and the first official document was released in 2010. Nonetheless, current political policies regarding the Arctic are being done in cooperation with the Danish government, since the Faroe Islands first in 2023 set out a plan to take over the airspace, maritime law, defence and security policy areas themselves.

=== Denmark and the EU ===
In 2015, the EU's External Action Service asked Denmark to contribute input to the Arctic section of the EU's upcoming global strategy, and the Danish Ministry of Foreign Affairs, together with Greenland and the Faroe Islands, also contributed to a more detailed proposal from the European Commission on the EU's efforts in the Arctic. Hereby, Denmark is, by virtue of Greenland and its EU membership, an obvious link for the EU to the Arctic, and Denmark therefore assists the EU in gaining influence in the Arctic. Despite the common efforts, joint declarations and Arctic policies and strategies within the EU, the EU has a minor role per se in the development of Denmark's own Arctic policy. Generally, Denmark has been wary of a more geopolitical engagement of the EU due to the fear that it may cause tensions in the approach towards Russia within the EU to the Arctic region and jeopardize the fragile consensus on the region as peaceful. However, this has changed after the outbreak of the war in Ukraine, where Danish Prime Minister Mette Frederiksen called for a referendum on the Danish opt-out on defence and security affairs. In June 2022, a Danish referendum on participating in the EU's defence and security was held with a final result showing that Denmark would join the EU's defence policy, which signaled the latest shift among Denmark as well as other Nordic countries to deepen defence ties in response to Russia's invasion of Ukraine. Denmark was the only EU member that was not part of the EU's defence and security policy. The referendum marked the first time a government has succeeded in abolishing one of several exemptions secured in a 1993 referendum on the Maastricht Treaty.

=== Denmark and NATO ===
The United States has often urged Denmark to increase its military spending to NATO, since Denmark in 2019 agreed to increase military spending from 1.35% of its economic output to 1.5% by 2023, but had been under pressure from the United States to reach the NATO target of 2%. Due to the outbreak of the war in Ukraine, a large majority of Danish parties agreed to set aside 7 billion DKK over the next two years to strengthen Danish defence, diplomacy and humanitarian efforts in March 2022. Prime Minister Mette Frederiksen emphasized that Denmark will significantly increase its defence budget and aim to become independent of Russian natural gas, and thereby increase its defence spending gradually to reach 2% of GDP to reach the NATO target.

In March 2023, Greenland and Denmark entered into an agreement to expand the Kingdom's NATO representation with a Greenlandic diplomat for the first time.

The Faroe Islands recognize how NATO's 2030 Strategy Concept document puts focus on the High North for the first time and reflects its role in this political debate. The Faroese Prime Minister has underlined the importance of cooperation between the Faroe Islands, the Danish Government, NATO and other member states of both NATO and the EU, all of which put a certain degree of focus on the state of the Arctic. NATO's new 2030 Strategy Concept document mentions the High North as a focus area for the first time and thus also the importance of freedom of navigation within the region. Here, it is important for both the Faroe Islands and Greenland to communicate and cooperate with the other allies in the Arctic, and the North Atlantic in general, in order to contribute to maintaining security and stability. In this context the United States has a special role, as does the United Kingdom, Canada and the other Nordic countries, who all play key roles in relation to the security policy situation in the region.

=== Denmark and the Arctic Council ===
The Arctic Council remains the primary international organization through which Denmark concretely collaborates with regional partners. This pertains to questions of environment and has extended to sustainable development and the life quality of indigenous peoples. Another central aspect to Danish involvement in the Arctic Council is a binding agreement among the eight member countries about search-and-rescue missions. Although the Arctic Council has been criticized for its inability to deal with questions of military nature, other institutionalized factors are actively decreasing the likelihood of international disagreements. Denmark took over the chairmanship of the Arctic Council on 12 May 2025 after Norway.

=== Denmark and the Nordic Council ===
The Nordic Council, also known as Nordisk Råd, serves as the recognized institution for formal inter-parliamentary collaboration among the Nordic countries. Since its establishment in 1952, it has been dedicated to promoting and enhancing Nordic culture and linguistic community through targeted initiatives. The council was created in the aftermath of World War II by Denmark, Sweden, Finland, and Norway, following several unsuccessful endeavors to establish a unified Nordic cooperation.

=== Denmark and the International Maritime Organization (IMO) ===
The International Maritime Organization (IMO) is of high importance with respect to supporting realm-wide efforts to implement the highest standards for health, security and environment. In recent years, Denmark has specifically worked in the IMO to ensure that the Arctic and Greenlandic affairs have been subject to attention in the work and decisions regarding pertaining to extraction opportunities for maritime businesses, increased security at sea, and protection of the ocean environment and coastal zones.

== Resources ==
The opportunities of economic growth through the natural resources of gas, oil and various minerals in the area are among the main objects in the national strategy. These opportunities are meant to be taken advantage of, but the Danish Foreign Ministry emphasizes that this needs to be regulated and that it needs to be both environmentally and socially sustainable. Mineral extraction is centered around gold, zinc, iron, copper, diamonds, rubies and a range of critical metals such as rare earth minerals. This was expected to serve as a strong foundation for the future economic development of the Greenlandic and Faroese societies.

=== Organic resources ===
The basis for exploiting organic resources in the Arctic is respect for historic, cultural and supply-related consideration as fish and ocean mammals make up the single most significant economic output for Greenland and the Faroe Islands. The continued sustainable development of Arctic fisheries are crucial as this business in fact covers nearly 85% of the total export of Greenland and 90% of the Faroese. As such, structure, function, diversity and integrity in the Arctic ecosystems are decisive with respect to productivity why sustainability is key to approaching these systems for economic gain. The most important areas for the management of organic resources are the Northern Atlantic Ocean, the Denmark Strait and the Davis Strait. The management of these areas are based on a quota system that is adjusted on an annual basis in consultation with private businesses and international organs such as the International Council for the Exploration of the Sea (ICES), the North Atlantic Marine Mammal Commission (NAMMCO), the North East Atlantic Fisheries Commission (NEAFC) and the International Whaling Commission (IWC) to ensure the respect of international conventions in Greenland as well as the Faroe Islands.

New opportunities for economic development in Greenland can tempt foreign investors as Greenland works to diversify its economy and create a basis for economic independence and prosperity. An opening of the North East Passage will likewise create new opportunities for the Faroe Islands from increased shipping and sailing activities. The national efforts to create the optimal framework for foreign investments are imperative in this regard such that Greenland and the Faroe Islands live up to international trade regulations and commitments as their economies enter new markets. Both countries are members of the World Trade Organization as part of the Danish Kingdom and the European Union, which likewise is considered an integral partner in other Arctic matters.

=== Internal disagreements about doing business with Russia ===
Within the Kingdom of Denmark, there are also occasional disagreements about specific elements of the Kingdom's common foreign policy, such as the export of uranium from Greenland and the EU's sanctions against Russia which the Faroe Islands have taken advantage of in terms of still doing business with Russia on agreements within the fishery industry. Russia is still one of the main Faroese trading partners and a boycott would leave the Faroe Islands in a deep financial crisis. This issue has sparked a new discussion within the Danish Parliament, Folketinget, as Danish politicians in many ways do not recognize the necessity of the businesses between the Faroe Islands and Russia, especially not after the outbreak of the war in Ukraine, but others understand the cultural and financial difference within the Kingdom.

=== Limits of the Continental Shelf ===
In December 2014, Denmark and Greenland submitted a spectacular joint claim to the UN Commission on the Limits of the Continental Shelf for the right to 895,000 square kilometers of seabed from Greenland's 200-mile limit across the North Pole and all the way to the Russian nautical mile baselines. This was a clear signal that Denmark is prepared to go to help to secure Greenland's interests in the Arctic. The claim was much larger than originally planned, and it shows a certain willingness to take risks, since Russia has overlapping interests in the Arctic Ocean. Clarification is currently taking place under UN auspices and then, presumably, negotiations between Russia and Denmark/Greenland (and perhaps Canada) about the boundaries on the seabed at the North Pole. The outcome is unpredictable, but one thing is certain: Regardless of how large a piece of seabed the Danish Kingdom may win the right to, the gains will primarily consist of access to any minerals, oil or gas on the seabed. minerals, oil or gas on the seabed; a privilege which will immediately accrue to Greenland. The full ownership of the resources in Greenland was, as mentioned, transferred to the Greenlandic people in 2009. The sea in the central parts of the Arctic Ocean is more than 4000 meters deep, and the available knowledge from the area does not indicate the presence of oil, gas or minerals of value, but the Danish-Greenlandic claim is, in the eyes of both Denmark and Greenland, an expression of sensible due diligence.

== Denmark's research within the Arctic region ==
Denmark has been heavily engaged in research in the Arctic and the Technical University of Denmark continues to conduct research typically on geology and environment of global importance. The Danish Kingdom has worked to ensure prime conditions for scientists and researchers to monitor and track the effects of climate change in the Arctic. This is an example of a global issue that requires a global solution, why the governments of Greenland, the Faroe Islands and Denmark have been long-time proponents of international collaboration from local levels to the United Nations while respecting the UN Declaration on Indigenous Peoples' Rights from 2007.

Already exposed due to the consequences of global warming, Denmark deems the protection of biodiversity and environment crucial to uphold as the climate shifts. Likewise, increased shipping can lead to higher risks of invasive species and contamination along with a range of other anthropogenically induced effects on biodiversity. To curb these tendencies, Denmark works with international partners to protect species and habitats based on surveillance, investigational analysis and proportional regulation.

As an area ripe for international cooperation, scientific research has brought Denmark closer to the northeastern states of China, Japan and South Korea as these three countries continuously increase their Arctic research efforts. The Danish government in 2003 formed a continental shelf project delegated to research institutions across the realm to establish further scientific basis for territorial claims.

== See also ==
International initiatives

- Arctic Climate Impact Assessment
- Arctic cooperation and politics
- Arctic Environmental Protection Strategy
- Arctic Ocean Conference
- Arctic Search and Rescue Agreement
- United Nations Convention on the Law of the Sea

Nordic initiatives

- Nordic Council
- Nordic Defence Cooperation
- Nordic model
- Nordic Innovation
- Nordic Investment Bank
- Nordic Passport Union
- Nordic countries
  Subdivisions of the Nordic countries
- West Nordic Council

Nation states policies

- Arctic policy of European Union
- Arctic policy of Canada
- Arctic policy of China
- Arctic policy of Finland
- Arctic policy of Norway
- Arctic policy of Russia
- Arctic policy of South Korea
- Arctic policy of Sweden
- Arctic policy of the United States

Foreign relations of the Kingdom of Denmark

- Foreign relations of Denmark (section Arctic disputes)
- Arctic (section International cooperation and politics)

Individuals of influence

- List of people from Greenland
- List of people from the Faroe Islands
- List of people from Denmark
- Knud Rasmussen, 1879–1933, explorer
