= Geopolitics of the Arctic =

Area study of geopolitics on the Arctic region

Arctic geopolitics is the area study of geopolitics on the Arctic region. The study of geopolitics deals with the "inalienable relationship between geography and politics", as it investigates the effects of the Earth's geography on politics and international relations. Arctic geopolitics focuses on the inter-state relations in the Arctic, which is the northernmost polar region. It is composed of the Arctic Ocean and its adjacent seas, and is home to around four million people. The states in or bordering the Arctic are commonly referred to as the Arctic Eight, and are the United States, Canada, Russia, Finland, the Kingdom of Denmark (Greenland), Norway, Iceland and Sweden.

The Arctic region is a unique environment. It is seasonally snow and ice covered and the indigenous peoples inhabiting it, such as the Sami and the Inuit peoples, adapted to its extreme cold, making up about a third of the Arctic's population. They coexist with the Arctic's unique ecosystems, which are some of the world's most vulnerable to climate change. The Arctic is also home to what is estimated to be nearly a quarter of the world's oil, gas and mineral deposits. The United States Geological Survey (USGS) assesses that the resources within the Arctic Circle account for 22% of undiscovered but recoverable resources in the world.

Geopolitical activity in the frozen Arctic has historically been fairly low. However, the onset of global warming is changing the region's geopolitical conditions. Over time, the Arctic melting is expected to reveal under-water resources and new shipping opportunities, which led to a fear of inter-state hostility in a scramble for new territories following the Russian flag planting on the North Pole sea bed in 2007. In reality, states bartered for unsettled territories in a peaceful manner after the Arctic states signed the 2008 Ilulissat Declaration committing themselves to peaceful cooperation, while events such as the Ukraine Crisis in 2014 had very marginal spill-over on the region. In 2019, most of the Arctic states are engaged in developing the governance of the region, such as bilateral agreements and Search and Rescue capabilities.

The Arctic Council was formed in 1996, as a primary step towards a union of Arctic states, by the five member states known as the Arctic Five.

== The Arctic Region ==
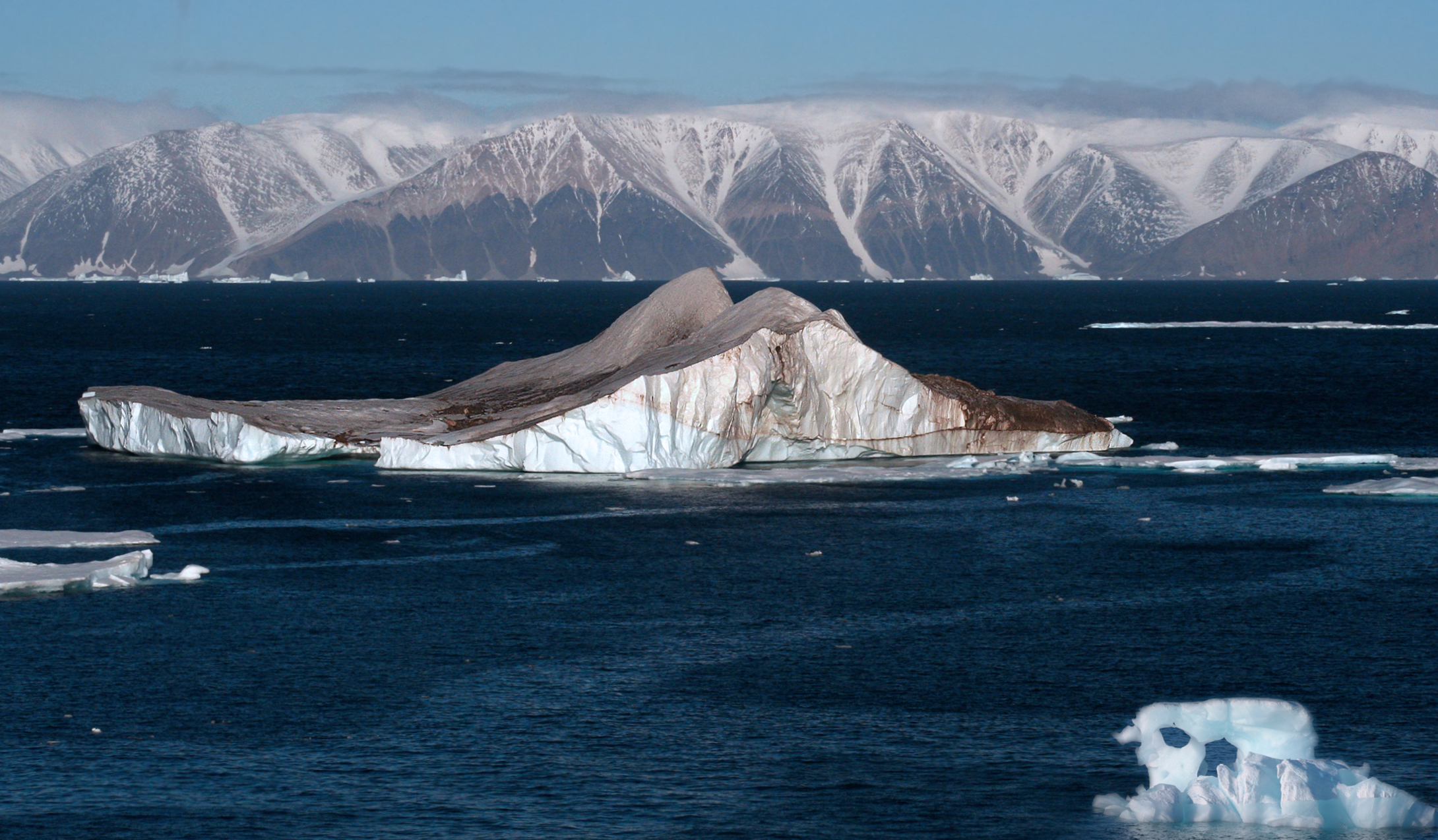

There exists different understandings of what the Arctic region is. According to Igor Krupnik the easiest definition of the Arctic is the north circumpolar area of the Earth, "encompassing the edges of the Eurasian and North American continents, and the island and adjacent waters of the Arctic, Pacific and Atlantic oceans". It is more complicated to pin down exactly where the Arctic begins and ends. In the geographical sense it is now common to equate the Arctic boundary with the +10 degrees Celsius isotherm of the warmest month of the year, which puts the Arctic at about 25 million square kilometres. Ecologists prefer to associate the Arctic boundary with the natural frontier of the Arctic tree line, making the region bigger than indicated by the isotherm measurement.

Political, cultural or anthropological boundaries are more contested. Distinguishing the Arctic from other areas by understandings of 'Arctic nations', 'the Arctic five' or 'Arctic economies' is common in both academia and popular literature. Anthropological understandings are subjective in the sense that ethnographic and political spaces "precede and produce established facts". The operational understanding is suggested by the IASC (International Arctic Science Committee). The IASC is exclusive to the Arctic Eight, who are awarded permanent status over other Arctic-interested nations and are "gradually becoming a grouping of political recognition".

The Arctic has attracted a lot of attention from critical security studies and maritime security, where it is a well-researched area. The region's frozen ecosystem combined with the fact that its political scene operates in isolation from the rest of the world creates a unique geopolitical theatre. Because of its unique polar geography and high sensitivity to climate change, the Arctic is also a leading indicator for environmental security studies. "Arctic amplification" means the Earth's poles are more sensitive to climate change than anywhere else on the planet. Global warming causes uncertainty in what possibilities a thawed Arctic will create, as well as concern for how states will respond to possibilities of new territories and resources, as it remains unclear exactly what changes global warming will unleash on the region.

Scholarly and journalistic interest in the region is also encouraged by the sentiments and narratives associated with the Arctic. The Russian flag planting on the North Pole seabed in 2007 to claim the Lomonosov Ridge sparked a story of 'the Great Game in the North' and the 'Scramble for the Arctic', even though states in reality settled for territories peacefully in accordance with international law set out by UNCLOS. The same event also kindled comparisons to expeditions of exploration and conquest of flag-planting pioneers. There exists an idealisation of the Arctic as an imagined isolated land frozen in time. While research determines the isolation narrative does not describe real Arctic politics, imaginaries play an important role for actors and institutions in the Arctic to make sense of the region.

== Climate change and geopolitics ==
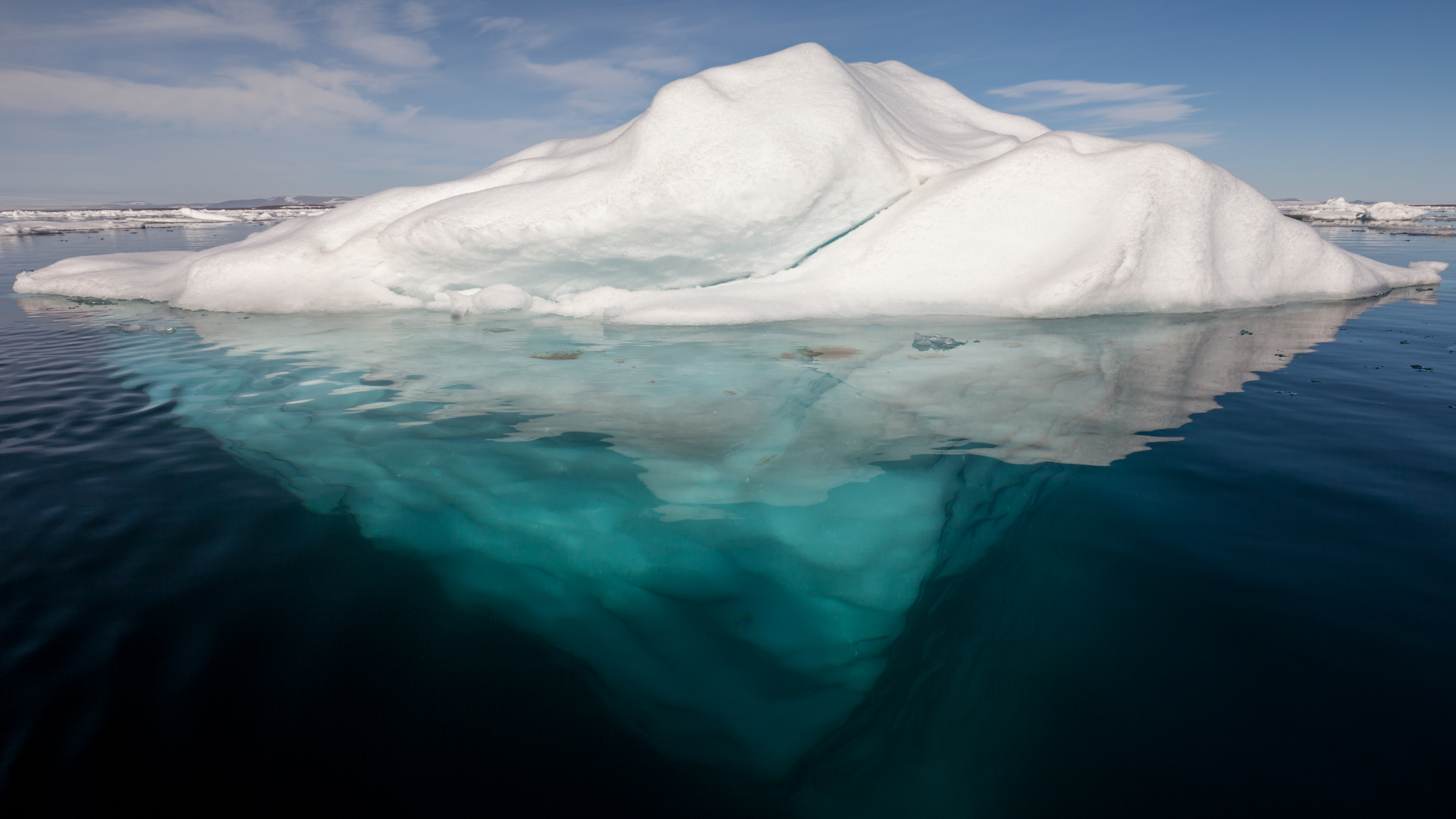
Significant reductions in sea ice coverage and thickness have been detected in the Arctic over the last three decades.

Climate change is crucial to Arctic geopolitics and has led to a renewed interest in the region's resources. The Arctic is experiencing the fast and drastic climate change with a temperature increase of 1.9 degrees C in the last 30 years. Climate change causes receding ice sheets, rising air and marine temperatures, melting of the Greenland ice sheet and decline of sea ice, ocean acidification and extreme weather events such as flooding, fires and drought. The thawing of the permafrost may release methane gases while natural resource stresses risk biological migration and extinction. The effect of Arctic amplification whereby the Earth's poles are more sensitive to climate changes than other areas of the planet means the Arctic and the Antarctic are seen as leading indicators of global warming. Snow and ice regimes are especially sensitive to even small increases in temperatures, while cold oceans are sensitive to changes in salinity, making the Arctic climate a complex and vulnerable system. These changes brought by global warming are also causing increased demands on governance in the Arctic as vulnerable ecosystems must be protected from increased human activity, including overfishing and water pollution.

While climate change will have uncertain and disastrous effects on the Arctic, it will also free undiscovered marine resources and open up shipping routes as the region melts. "The melting of the ice in the Arctic due to global warming is expected to cause major environmental and geopolitical changes in the Arctic". These environmental developments have led to fears in journalism and academia of an increased likelihood in geopolitical conflict. According to traditional international relations theory, states are self-interested actors who try to maximise their own gains. As explained by scholar Stokke, there is a direct link between climate change and resource-related conflict: "inherent in the concept of environmental security is the understanding that threats arising from environmental degradation and resource rivalry may prove severe enough to generate violent conflict. The geopolitical consequence of global warming is as such that there is a link between access to valuable resources and sovereign territory. The Arctic has been a known source of natural resources since the first explorers discovered whales, seals and fish. The three most important resources in the Arctic are minerals, fish stocks and huge oil and gas reserves, most of which are located in Russian territories. "Long-term interstate conflict potential" in the Arctic lies in access to petroleum and minerals, renewable marine resources or shipping lanes.

=== Limited commercial prospects ===
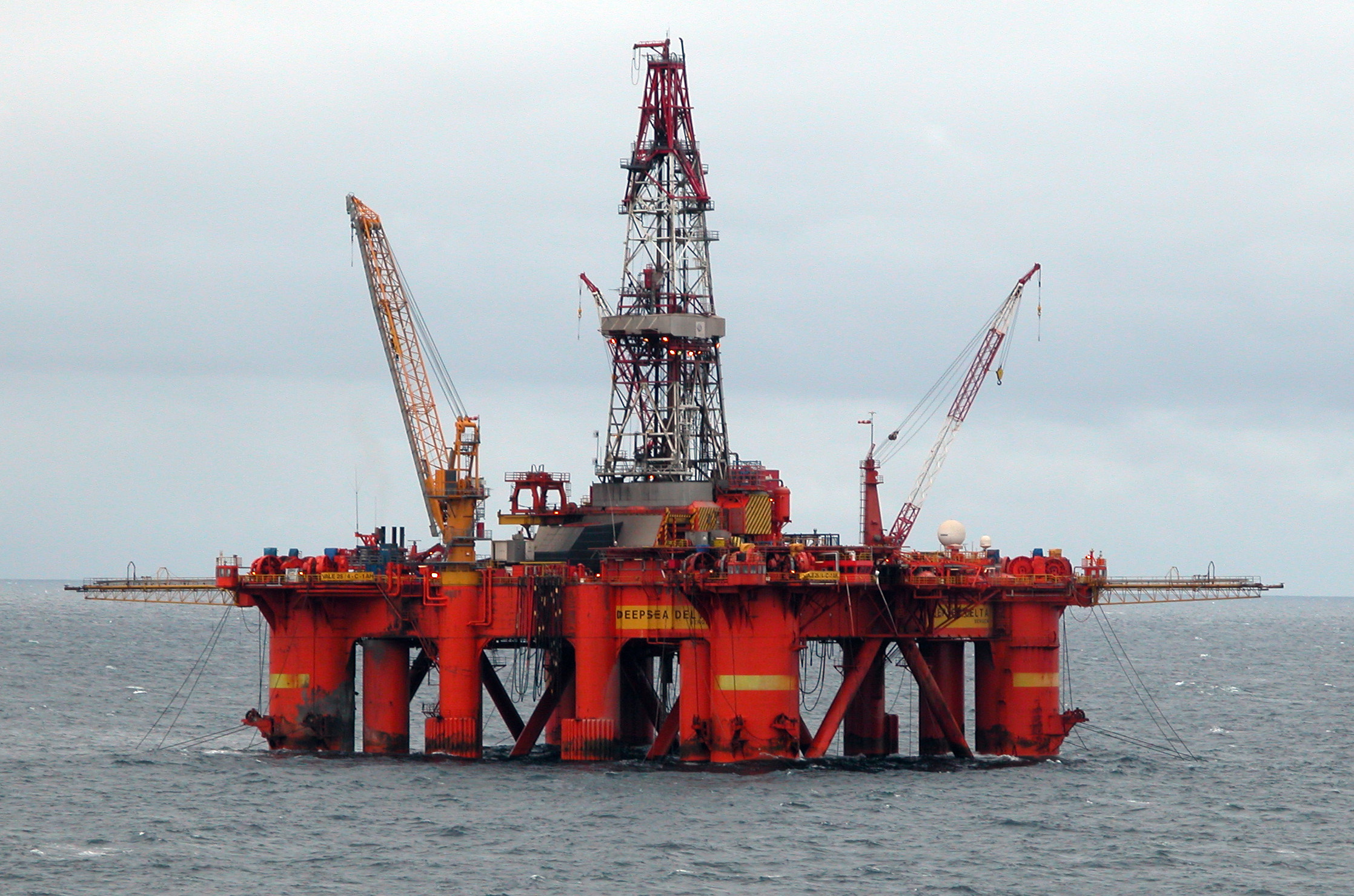
Oil platform in the North Sea

Despite climatic changes and Arctic shrinkage, the commercial prospects of extracting resources are limited and speculative. While gas is believed to be the most common hydrocarbon in the region, developing Arctic oil and gas fields will be a slow and costly process. Further, Norway and Russia already have bilateral partnerships in place for cooperation in oil and fishing. Because "continuity marks many of the factors that constrain trans-Arctic shipping, while the climate effects on the economics of resource use in the Arctic remain ambiguous", climate change may not change the commercial viability of the Arctic Ocean greatly. The Arctic's extreme conditions mean that the recoverability of oil in the Arctic Ocean is practically difficult and expensive, meaning governments are unlikely to risk war over oil reserves in the Arctic.

== Territorial claims ==
The emergence of undiscovered marine resources and new shipping routes from global warming caused an increased commercial interest in the region by Arctic states. This heightened profile also invites speculation and exaggeration - "global coverage of Arctic politics since 2007 has fed popular narratives about the potential for conflict in the region". The first event to spark concern was the Russian expedition of two small submarines to plant a Russian flag (Arktika 2007) on the North Pole seabed to claim the Lomonosov Ridge as a part of the Russian continental shelf. This was a demonstration of Russia's bid to gain rights to the large supplies of hydrocarbons on the seabed. According to the 1982 UN Convention on the Law of the Sea (UNCLOS), coastal states have rights to the exploration and extraction of marine resources within their exclusive economic zone (EEZ), which extends 200 nautical miles off their coast. Beyond the EEZ territory is open to consultation as per clauses 4-7 if a state can prove the sea floor is an extension of its own continental shelf. Russia's Natural Resources Ministry stated in 2007 that the crust structure of the ridge corresponds to the Russian continental crust, and should thus be considered part of Russia's continental shelf. Russia's claim to the Lomonosov Ridge is still contested by Canada and Denmark, who filed a claim with the UN Commission in 2014 based on the connection between Greenland and Lomonosov. Russia submitted another bid in 2015. The legal status of the shelf remains disputed because generally recognised research on the seabed is lacking. The US has meanwhile signed but not ratified the UNCLOS, and cannot submit any claims.

The disputed status of the Lomonosov Ridge has failed to cause any serious conflict. There has been significant progress in settling sovereignty questions in the Arctic, and most resources lie within settled boundaries already. The remaining contested or unclaimed areas of the Arctic which states have wished to acquire are the US versus the Russian Federation in the Bering Sea, the US versus Canada in the Beaufort Sea and Canada versus Denmark in the Davis Strait. Canada and Denmark are involved in a dispute over Hans Island in the Nares Strait. Canada also considers the Northwest Passage to be part of its own waters while most other states view the passage as an international strait, but has not initiated any legal proceedings. Russia and Norway resolved the dispute over the Barents Sea in 2010, but they still dispute fishing rights in the exclusive economic zone (EEZ) around the island of Svalbard. In the post-2007 period scholars generally concur that conflict over territory in the Arctic is unlikely. The Arctic Institute determines there are no politically significant conflicts over maritime and territorial boundaries left after the Barents Sea dispute was resolved.

== Multilateral cooperation and the Arctic Council ==
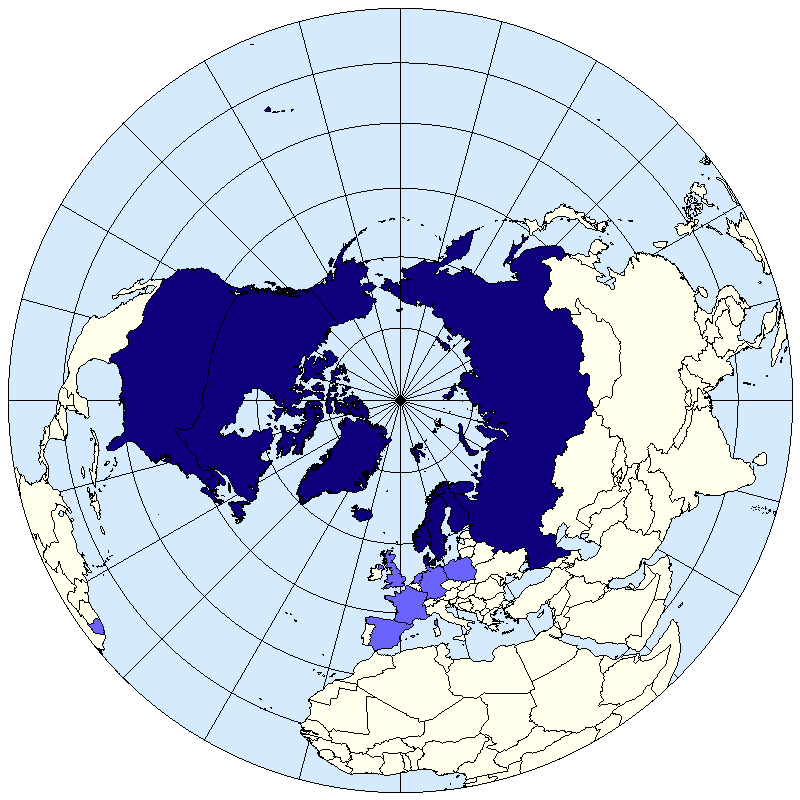
Arctic Council map (now outdated)

The signing of the Ilulissat Declaration in 2008 left little room for future serious conflict between the Arctic states. The decision to sign the declaration by the Arctic 5 was a deliberate response the misrepresentations of expansionist Russia in media and the dispute over Hans Island. The signatory states discussed the division of emergency responsibilities should new shipping lanes emerge by climate change, and pledged themselves to "the orderly settlement of any possible overlapping claims" for territorial disputes. They consequently pledged themselves to developing the governance of the region, including protecting the environment, through peaceful cooperation under the auspices of international law. The declaration sets the tone for the strategic future of the region as it emphasised cooperation under international law in the issues of "protection of marine environment, reducing the risk of ship based pollution, strengthening search and rescue capabilities, enhancing maritime safety, cooperation on scientific research and enhanced disaster response mechanisms".

Although the whole of the Arctic Council was not involved in the Ilulissat Declaration, which only invited the coastal states of the Arctic Ocean, the Arctic Council is the main intergovernmental regional forum of the Arctic. The permanent members of its Council are the Arctic 8, and its purpose is to deal with the governance issues faced by the Arctic states and the indigenous people of the Arctic. The Council is actively furthering the region's governance, for example in having a unique Search and Rescue agreement which covers all land and water above the Arctic Circle. This is unusual since it transcends the land-water divide which underpins the modern state system. Thereby the Arctic Council through creative interpretations of existing norms, "successfully reproduces the norms of the state system and the rule of law, thereby facilitating the intensification of the region as a zone of commercial activity".

As the region opens up from climate change, the demands on governance are motivating states to expand their navies and military programmes. Some authors like Huebert have interpreted this as a sign of concern. but analyses of Russia's military modernisation programmes have shown that military capabilities are taking on policing and regulatory tasks, such as Search and Rescue. Canada is also upgrading their military equipment and doctrines for better control of the Arctic and responding to emergencies. According to Konyshev and Sergunin, military power in the Arctic is becoming characterised by policing functions, to "prevent illegal migration and potential terrorist attacks against critical industrial and infrastructural objects, fulfil some dual-use functions (such as search and rescue operations, monitoring air and maritime spaces, providing navigation safety, mitigating natural and man-made catastrophes)".

== The Politics of the Arctic Five ==
Some states have a more prominent role than others, due to their location and expertise in Arctic environments. This is highlighted in the grouping of the Arctic Five. Defining and outlining the Arctic Five member states and their interests in the Arctic offers a broad understanding of the politicisation of the Arctic Area. This section focuses mainly on political debates from 2021 and onwards.

=== Canada ===
Canada is located in North America and links to the Atlantic Ocean, the Pacific Ocean, and the Arctic Ocean. The Canadian Government outlines its relevance in the Arctic political debate, and underlines its expertise in natural resources in the Arctic. There is a strong emphasis on the experiences of building previous strategies in the area, policies, and agreements, which link to the expertise of the indigenous peoples in Canada and its commitment to United Nations Declaration on the Rights of Indigenous Peoples.

Canada's hold on its Arctic region might be facing challenges, as both Russia and China are showing interest in exploitation of natural resources in the Arctic. There is a realistic threat to the Canadian sovereignty in the Arctic. Canada is aiming to modernise the North American Aerospace Defence Command, and to focus on collaboration between the allies against exploitation of the Arctic.

Justin Trudeau announced in 2019 a new Arctic and Northern Political Framework that underlines the importance of adhering to a rule-based international order in the Arctic region. Canada has formed multiple complaints about the US's approach to Arctic geopolitics and Arctic strategies, and this has led to some political debates between the neighbouring countries.

=== Norway ===
The Arctic Circle includes approximately 35% of Norway's mainland, which also accounts for 9% of the population. In 2021 the Norwegian Government published an Arctic Policy briefing which outlined the country's ambitions in Arctic security, stability, and development. It is also stated that Norway's foreign and domestic policy also covers Arctic region. The Norwegian Government underlines its contribution and respect to The United Nations Convention on the Law of the Sea fundamental framework for legal regime in the Arctic region. Through organisational framework there have been many new jobs in the Arctic region in Norway, and there must be kept a high standard of work environment and job opportunities.

Norway currently holds the presidency of the Nordic Council as well as the chairmanship in the Arctic Council. Through these positions Norway is working towards a defence cooperation in the Arctic.

Norway is considered a small state that uses big state strategies, and it shows in its political stance on the Arctic. This can be perceived in its bilateral relationship with Russia. While Russia has posed security threats to the Arctic and to Norwegian national security, Norway announced its plan to maintain a diplomatic relationship with Russia. There are steps being taken to hold Russian intelligence activity under control.

Norway's main interests in the Arctic are economic, which links to the oil industry and fishing industry. These interests shape Norway's approach to the Arctic, as neglect of these areas would affect Norway's economy on the big scale. Norway recognises its role in the geopolitics of the Arctic and aims to keeps its image of a peacekeeping nation.

=== Russia ===
Russia stretches over approximately 53% of the Arctic Ocean coastline and is an enormous actor in the debate regarding the Arctic. Russia accounts for almost half of the general population in the Arctic territory with approximately 2.5 million inhabitants. Russia has previously been cooperative with the Arctic Council and has emphasised the importance of a sustainable environment for natural resources and a wide used of renewable energy in the Arctic region. The Russian invasion of Ukraine early 2022 has led to some disagreements between states in the Northern area, and this has affected Russia's role and stance in the Arctic Council. The Kremlin published documents in February 2023 that declared Russia' amendments to previous prioritisation of interests of the Arctic Council, and rather focuses on Russian national interests.

Russia has to a certain degree respected the legal frame of Law of the Sea and collaborated with other Arctic states. But there have been some issues. Russia planted a flag on the seabed of the Arctic in 2007 as an expression of Russian expansion.

The aftermath of the Russian Invasion has had an impact on the political situation in the Arctic. There were consequences for Russia, such as protests and sanctions as the Arctic Council collaboration was disrupted. Russia is still active in the Arctic region.

=== United States ===
The United States became a considered Arctic Nation through the purchase of Alaska in 1867. The US has multiple interests in the Arctic and aims at a well-protected and developed region. Last year The White House published the first update of the National Strategy for The Arctic Region since 2013. This update outlines the US's interest, which all are linked to the Arctic. Pillar 1: Security, pillar 2: Climate change and environmental protection, pillar 3: Sustainable economic development, and pillar 4: International cooperation and governance. The US's vision enhances its interests through the Arctic, which, in comparison to other Arctic states' government reports, has not been mentioned before, excluding Russia's amendments. The report outlines a reoccurring promise of working towards a developed Arctic region that is shy of conflicts.

The Kingdom of Denmark and the US have a long and mutual beneficial relationship, and this has been projected in the US's military presence in Greenland during the Second World War and afterwards.

The US acts on the Monroe Doctrine as it won't let any other country to secure the basis for a welfare society in Greenland, should they want independence.

US President, Donald Trump, considered "buying" Greenland in 2019, and this led to protests from international society and Danish government. The US Secretary of State, Antony J. Blinken, announced in 2021 that the US was no longer looking to purchase Greenland. This was considered a signal of administration shift from the Trump presidency to Joe Biden's administration in 2021.

=== Denmark ===
Denmark as its own entity does not physically have any relations to the Arctic region and is only represented as an Arctic state through Greenland and the Faroe Islands.

The Danish Foreign- and Security Policy strategy extends to Arctic matters, and there was a small focus on the Arctic in Government report from 2022 and 2023.

The Danish Government published a separate Arctic strategy for all three countries within the Danish Kingdom that outlines the common grounds for all parts of the Realm. This strategy stretched from 2011 until 2020. The report states the Realm's appreciation of cooperation within the Arctic, common goals, and maintenance of a sustainable Arctic region. The three parts of the Kingdom have been working on a new Arctic Strategy that is expected to expand until 2030. The Russian invasion in Ukraine in 2022 led to suspicion and actions against the federation, which have also altered the political challenge in the Arctic region. The Danish Kingdom responded by increasing its military budget. Within the new report on Arctic strategies, it is expected to see more involvement with Greenlandic and Faroese ministers.

Because Greenland is part of the Danish Realm, Denmark can participate in some very important international collaborations and gain more influence than a small state would normally be able to. Scholars refer to the "Greenland card", that Denmark waives to pursue stronger Foreign Affairs and relevance in the political debate about the Arctic, as well as seeking international recognition.

There have also been a lot of difficulties regarding the Faroe Islands' ongoing trade agreements within the fishery industry, which has created an uncomfortable situation within the Danish Realm.

== Expansion of Arctic Governance 2013 ==
In 2013 six new states were accepted as permanent observers (POs) to the Arctic Council: Italy, China, Singapore, India, Japan and South Korea reflecting an increased global attention to the region. The EU also submitted an application, however the Council "deferred a final decision" and the application remains on hold. The new permanent observers were accepted on a number of conditions: respect for the jurisdiction of Arctic states, a commitment to the legal frameworks of the region including UNCLOS, respect for "indigenous peoples and other Arctic inhabitants", and contributions to the region through scientific expertise and cooperation. These conditions have later shaped the new states' approach to the Arctic by emphasising scientific cooperation and research. With a relatively short Arctic history, science has been especially important to the new Asian observers as a way of legitimising their Arctic engagement. This is also known science diplomacy where states legitimise and promote national interests through scientific work. The following subsections develop the interests and engagement of some of these new permanent observers offering an understanding of what is driving the increased global attention to the North.

=== Japan ===
Japan has the longest history of Arctic engagement among the non-Arctic Asian states. In 1920 it became the first Asian signatory to the Spitsbergen Treaty, affirming Norwegian sovereignty over the Svalbard archipelago while permitting economic activity by the signatories. Japan was the first non-Arctic state to establish an Arctic research station - in Ny-Ålesund in 1991 - and has since the establishment of the Arctic Council in 1996 contributed to several of its working groups. In 2015 Japan appointed its first Arctic Ambassador and released its first Arctic policy paper, emphasising environmental research, cooperation, and sustainable development. This is further promoted in Japan's 2023 Fourth Basic Ocean Plan outlining three Arctic priority areas: research and development, international cooperation, and sustainable use.

Japan's approach reflects a blue-economy perspective where economic opportunity and sustainability are not mutually exclusive. With many low-lying, densely populated coastal areas, Japan is highly vulnerable to sea-level rise and extreme weather linked to Arctic warming, increasing Japan's interest in Arctic climate research. These concerns have not diminished its economic ambitions: Japan relies heavily on food and energy imports, many of which are abundant in the Arctic - especially seafood and LNG (liquid natural gas). Furthermore, shipping through the Russian-controlled Northern Sea Route (NSR) can reduce transit from Japan to Europe with up to a week, and since the NSR opened to international use in 2010 Japan has been one of the main transiting nationalities. Japan also pursues extractive initiatives, including a 2018 energy infrastructure agreement with Russia, mining exploration in Greenland, and mining projects on the Norwegian shelf.

Compared with other non-Arctic actors, Japan is viewed as more cautious, balancing its interests with the sovereign rights of littoral states and broader great-power dynamics. It prioritises international cooperation and the rule of law, including adherence to UNCLOS Article 234 granting Arctic littoral states special rights. Japan's approach is further shaped by its security alliance with the United States: growing U.S.-China rivalry has contributed to a less vocal Japanese posture, emphasising environmental and human security over military concerns.

=== South Korea (ROK) ===
South Korea, the Republic of Korea (ROK), has a relatively short history of Arctic engagement, only signing the Spitsbergen Treaty in 2012 to become a Permanent Observer in 2013. Earlier steps, however, laid the groundwork to ROK's acceptance as a new observer-member; in 2002 ROK established the Dasan Research Station in Ny-Ålesund and in 2009 the research icebreaker Aaron was commissioned. In 2013 South Korea launched its first Arctic policy with three overarching objectives: cooperative partnerships, scientific research, and the exploration of new business opportunities. These resonate with ROK's Arctic policy today, focussing on energy sources, scientific research and economic opportunities - mainly shipping and shipbuilding.

South Korea has several densely populated low-lying areas and is prone to the rising sea levels from melting glaciers and ice sheets as well as more frequent extreme weather in Eastasia increasingly linked to the changing Arctic climate. Though environmental concerns motivate scientific work they do not define ROK's overall Arctic ambitions. ROK has adopted a forwardgoing and business-oriented approach, with a strong emphasis on energy and shipping. As a country highly dependent on crude oil-imports for its major industries, including shipbuilding, strengthening Arctic engagement is strategically important to the ROK. A key driver has been an unstable situation in the Middle East, supplying much of ROK's oil, leading to a pursuit of diversified energy sources - especially the Arctic.

Promoting Arctic shipping and building icebreaking-vessels has been a national priority, and in 2019 ROK delivered 15 icebreaking vessels to the Russian Yamal Project - the largest LNG-icebreaker contract ever signed. Despite periods of low oil prices and a stretched shipping sector, ROK maintains its Arctic shipping ambitions and it is a policy aim to position the port of Busan as a future oil-transit hub.

ROK's Arctic engagement should also be understood through the lens of geopolitics and great-power balancing. Despite its strong interest in energy, ROK remains reluctant to pursue joint Arctic infrastructure ventures with China, due to historically complicated ties and concerns about future dependency. Increased US-Sino rivalry might further caution ROK behaviour, as its defense alliance with the US can motivate American alignment rather than cooperation with China. Yet ROK has also promoted trilateral Arctic coordination with China and Japan, and it remains to be seen whether ROK's engagement will be defined by increased East/West tensions in the Arctic, or whether it will bridge some of those divisions.

=== China ===
China`s history in the Arctic is one shaped by a combination of both strategic considerations and scientific interests in the region. In 1925 China signed the Svalbard Treaty, formally involving them in Arctic affairs and granting them rights to engage in commercial and scientific activities on the archipelago. While China`s involvement in the Arctic has remained limited throughout much of the 20th century, the Svalbard Treaty provided an early legal basis for later engagement. The establishment of the Yellow River Station in Ny-Ålesund, Svalbard, in 2004 marked a significant step that enabled sustained Chinese research on things such as climate change, atmospheric science, glaciology and polar meteorology. This reflected China`s growing recognition of the Arctic`s importance for understanding global climate systems, and their effect on China`s domestic environment.

2013 was a major institutional turning point for China, as they were granted observer status in the Arctic Council, the principal forum for Arctic governance. This status enhanced China`s participation in Arctic discussions, especially on scientific and environmental topics. In its 2018 White Paper, China formally described themselves as a "near-Arctic state", and argued that developments in the region has significant implications for China`s climate, economic development and long-term interests. This institutional recognition coincided with a broader expansion of Arctic Governance, as the Arctic Council increasingly incorporated the interests of non-Arctic states affected by developments in the region. China`s observer status enabled participation in Arctic Council working groups and allowed them to contribute scientific expertise and engage in discussions on topics such as sustainable development and climate research- all while remaining excluded from formal decision-making authority. The inclusion of China and other observer states reflects the growing internationalization of Arctic governance, driven by climate change, increased Arctic accessibility and global economic independence. Arctic governance has now evolved from a more regional framework to a more inclusive, multi-level system that involves both Arctic and non-Arctic stakeholders.

Environmental and economic considerations both shape China`s interests in the Arctic region. Arctic warming affects global climate systems with direct implications for China, which makes polar research important for climate prediction and environmental governance. China has also sought to engage in Arctic economic activities, especially related to natural sources- through investment and cooperation with Arctic states- without asserting territorial claims.

The Polar Silk Road (PSR) is an extension of the Belt and Road Initiative (BRI). The PSR envisions the development of Arctic maritime routes, particularly the Northern Sea route, as alternative shipping corridors between Asia and Europe. Chinese policy documents and academic discourse emphasize that the PSR should be developed through cooperation with Arctic states, compliance with international law and environmental protection in mind. At the same time, scholars have noted that the initiative also reflects China`s broader interests in diversifying trade routes and reducing dependence on traditional maritime chokepoints.

Western and Chinese perspectives on China`s growing involvement in the Arctic differ. Western viewpoints often frame China`s Arctic activities in terms of geopolitical competition, strategic influence and power projection- especially in the context of broader great power rivalry. From this perspectie, Chinese scientific research, infrastructure and commercial activities are sometimes viewed as having potential strategic implication. In contrast to this, Chinese viewpoints emphasize scientific cooperation, environmental responsibility and multilateral governance. Chinese actors frequently portray the Arctic as a region of shared global concern, where non-Arctic states have legitimate interests related to climate change and sustainable development. This divergence in narratives reflects broader differences in strategic culture and perceptions of security and governance.

China`s Arctic involvement has important implications for the future governance and development of the region. Their participation contributes to the increasing internationalization of Arctic affairs and highlights the growing role of non-Arctic states in regional decision-making. At the same time, China`s expanding presence presents both opportunities and challenges for Arctic states, particularly in relation to investments, infrastructure development, environmental protection and regulatory frameworks. As climate change continues to increase Arctic accessibility, China`s role in the region is likely to expand further. The extent and nature of this involvement will depend on cooperation with Arctic states, adherence to existing legal frameworks and the ability of institutions to manage growing strategic and economic interest in the Arctic.

== Literature ==
The 2007 Russian flag planting sparked concerns in academia and journalism that states would scramble for territories in the Arctic, and created a debate on whether the situation in the Arctic would lead to conflict. The question of conflict versus cooperation has defined much of International Relations research on Arctic geopolitics, with some authors arguing strongly for an against and others in the middle. The Russian flag planting was followed by a cascade of journalists and academics publishing work on the "'scramble for the poles', the 'rush for resources' and the 'new Great Game in the North'". The Russian expedition caused pessimistic assessments of the security situation of the Arctic, especially from American and Canadian academics. They take the view that the "vast untapped resources", in particular oil and natural gas of which the extraction is not limited by federal or state law, may cause regional rivalry in conjunction with an aggressive and remilitarised Russia.

The first such publication was 'Arctic Meltdown: The Economic and Security Implications of Global Warming' by Scott G. Borgerson, who warned of Russian aggression and argued a scramble for territory and resources was underway. The common argument from this perspective is that competition over emerging resources will not necessarily lead to outright military conflict, but military activity and acts of aggression signal a return to traditional power politics. Several works on the gold rush theme were published between 2008 and 2019, but most of them such as Anderson and Byers point out that the majority of resources lie within settled boundaries already and that states prefer to use international law and institutions to mediate disputes, evidenced by the claims submitted to UNCLOS and the signing of the Ilulissat Declaration.

Legitimate concerns for conflict in the Arctic weakened after the signing of the Ilulissat Declaration in 2008, after which the alarmist views became increasingly marginalised. Authors now mostly agree that research seriously considering conflict escalation "counts on incomplete and oversimplified data and assumptions and can hardly survive a rigorous verification and a confrontation with the reality of the situation". The Barents Sea dispute between Russia and Norway was the last substantial conflict and was resolved in 2010, and the Arctic Institute determines there are no politically significant conflicts over maritime and territorial boundaries anymore.

Later works on the Arctic conflict question after 2010 come from diverse perspectives of foreign policy, international law and environmental security and generally approve of a broader approach than a realist interest-based model. As Knecht and Keil say, the Arctic states are seeking to establish sovereign rights over the Arctic Ocean and the North Pole not necessarily just to gain ownership of resources, but to demarcate "distinct areas of state responsibility" for regional governance. In international media the Arctic has been framed and portrayed as a potential conflict zone, particularly due to its undiscovered resources. However considering the still limited exploitability of those resources and the Arctic's strong record of post-Cold War peace and cooperation, the strategic state of the Arctic region appears to be fairly stable and the likelihood of geopolitical conflict continues to be low.
