= Politics of the Barents Sea =

The Barents Sea is a secluded part of the Arctic Ocean divided between Norway and Russia. The politics in the Barents Sea is of paramount importance for the 2 countries relationship, showing both maritime conflict and maritime cooperation.

Moreover, the natural resources in the region are necessary for the states' economic development. As global warming is melting the icecaps, new shipping routes are opening up. Other states have established new interests in the area. Moreover, natural resources and Petroleum exploration in the Arctic remains of high interest for both states.

== Barents Sea ==
The Barents Sea is located on the northern Norwegian coastline within Russian and Norwegian territorial waters. It has a surface area of 1,400,000 square kilometres in the Arctic Ocean. With its average depth of 230 meters, it contains valuable natural resources for both states, like hydrocarbons and fish stocks. Its unique positioning places the ocean between the Russian Federation and the smaller yet NATO-centred state of Norway.

The Barents Sea is managed through treaties consistent with international law. These treaties are of paramount importance for the management of the area. However, legal compliance is often found to be lacking in consistency.

== Historical background ==
Norway and Russia have never been at war with one another. Moreover, the 200-kilometre territorial border has remained intact since the signing of the bilateral border treaty of 1824. Furthermore, the Russian liberation of northern Norway in October 1944 – accompanied by a voluntarily withdrawal from Norway, led to a stable relationship in the years after the end of WWII.

After WWII, Russia and Norway have been indifferent political and cultural systems, with contrasting alliances and ultimately, maritime security. Norway's defence was interconnected to the United States, and NATO's throughout the cold war, merging its military capabilities with its fellow member-states. NATO's deterrence and protection strategy (Art. 5, NATO) has thus ensured Norwegian sovereignty since 1949.

== Norway ==
Norwegian security in the Barents sea continues to be driven by a defence against the powerful presence of the Russian Federation. Consequently, Norway has requested one of the most substantial Arctic defence policies in the entire NATO alliance. The NATO membership has been the pillar of Norwegian defence since they joined, and continues to be so today.

The UN Convention on the Law of the Sea (UNCLOS) transformed Norway into a central arctic player, holding a maritime jurisdiction of two million square-kilometres, six times the countries’ own land territory. However, the debate on maritime borders is still highly disputed in the Barents Sea. This is connected with the issue that the arctic was not a priority during the United Nations establishment of UNCLOS in 1982. The Arctic is not mentioned anywhere in its legal framework, which has created legal contestation between the Arctic states.

The annexation of Crimea by the Russian Federation in 2014, affected the bilateral relationship greatly, and cooperation and diplomacy were reduced. Consequently, scholars have suggested the return of more realist geopolitics in the Barents Sea, The bilateral relationship cannot be taken out of the power politics between NATO and Russia. These realist policies can further polarize the region and hinder cooperation.

In 2018, NATO's military exercise ‘Trident Juncture’ further challenged the bilateral relationship. The exercise was the largest military exercise held in the high north – which included over 51,000 soldiers, 248 planes, and about 10 000 vehicles – including over 60 naval vessels.

== Russia ==
Russia's ambition in the Barents sea is connected to the strategic importance of the oceans' abundance of natural resources. However, the region is also strongly connected to its own maritime military capabilities, where its largest base for naval forces is located in Murmansk.

Moreover, Russia's drills and naval capabilities have grown significantly in the area since 2014. On the Kola Peninsula Russia has over the last five years been working on modernizing its military capabilities. The Barents Sea is a base area for Russian nuclear weapons, as over half of Russia's maritime nuclear warhead, totalling 416 of 752, are connected to ballistic missile submarines (SSBNs) in operation from Gadzhiyevo, Murmansk.

Geopolitics Due to the diplomatic effects of Russia's annexation of Crimea in 2014, the trilateral Russian-US- Norwegian military exercise “Northern Eagle” was cancelled that same year (Nilsen, 2014). In the spring of 2014, NATO stopped all of its civilian and military cooperation with Russia.

Thus, the combination of the annexation of Crimea and the large NATO exercise Trident Juncture creates the potential for further militarisation. Russia has since increased their ‘snap drills’ in the Barents sea, starting with an exercise in June 2018, which included 36 naval vessels and 20 military aircraft.

In 2017 the Russian Defence ministry suggested that the Svalbard dispute holds the potential for future conflict with Norway, and in consequence, NATO. The Svalbard Fishery Protection Zone (FPZ) remains a concern for both Russia and Norway, as arrests of fishing vessels have consistently had the potential to escalate towards larger conflict.

The establishment of the Arctic Council in 1996 opened up for increased multilateral cooperation in the Barents sea. While Russian authorities have been positive to cooperation via the Arctic Council, the council itself does not discuss matters of security. This is in accordance with Article 2 (a1) of the Ottawa Declaration. Moreover, Russia's annexation of Crimea suspended the NATO-Russian council (Hykkerud, 2019). Thus, the Barents Sea is currently lacking a military forum in which to build dialogue and trust.

China received observer status in 2013, with much debate. The other Non-Arctic States that have observer status in the Arctic council include Germany (1998), the United Kingdom (1998), Poland (1998), The Netherlands (1998), France (2000), Spain (2006), Italy (2013), Japan (2013), India (2013), Korea (2013), Singapore (2013) and Switzerland (2017) (Arctic Council, n.d.)

== Climate change ==
Climate change in the arctic has established new interest in the Barents Sea, as there is an increase in new potential shipping routes. As the ice zones are receding, international interest increases.

The marginal ice zone is defined by the Norwegian Polar Institute as “the transitional zone between the open sea and dense drift ice. It spans from where 15% of the sea surface is covered by ice to 80% ice concentration”. The southern border of this MIZ is referred to as the ice edge and the process of defining the limit of the ice edge is a political decision decided by the Norwegian parliament. The Norwegian polar institute suggests that the ice edge should be at the point where there is a 0.5% chance for surface ice in April. The ice edge is an important area for plankton growth, and a potential oil spill could irreparably damage the arctic ecosystem. In 2015 the Norwegian government decided that this point should be where there was a 30% chance for ice in April. This opened up much of the Arctic to oil exploration, and after 2015 many oil concessions were given out. In the 2018 Granavolden Agreement, between the Norwegian Conservative, Liberal, Progress and Christian Democratic party, it was determined that no oil exploration was to be carried out north of the ice edge. In 2020, the Norwegian Erna Solberg Cabinet proposed to shift the ice edge southward to where there is a 15% per cent chance for ice in April.

== Introduction to the delimitation agreement ==
The Barents sea was until 2010 the site of a border dispute between Russia and Norway. Referring to article 6 of UNCLOS Norway held that the maritime border should be at the median line between the two countries EEZ, whereas the USSR stood by a 1926 declaration that the maritime boundary should be determined through a sectoral approach. In 1978 the two states agreed to establish a 60,000 km “Grey Zone” in the disputed area. This Grey Zone Agreement needed to be renewed every year, it regulated fishing resources in the area and placed a moratorium on oil exploration in the area.

On 15 September 2010, President of Russia Dmitry Medvedev and Prime Minister of Norway Jens Stoltenberg signed “The Delimitation agreement”. The treaty established a 1700-kilometre boundary line between the states' EEZs and in the Barents Sea. There exists a substantial debate on why and when the delimitation agreement was signed.

While academics have not been able to determine the exact reason why Russia was willing to compromise and solve the border dispute, some have offered differing explanations. Henriksen & Ulfstein argue that economic interests lay at the root of the 2010 agreement, in particular the prospect of ice loss opening up the Barents Sea to maritime transport and access to natural resources. By signing the agreement Russia indicated a willingness to have international agreements lay at the root of future arctic cooperation. Rather than focus on the economic interests, Moe et al. highlight how solving the territorial dispute signalled that Russia was attempting to improve its image as a rule-abiding player on the international arena with the goal of strengthening UNCLOS in particular in the Arctic.

== Svalbard Zone dispute ==
The maritime zones around the coast of Svalbard is one of the most contested areas in the Barents Sea. The Svalbard Treaty was signed in 1920 as a part of the treaty negotiations at Versailles, granting Norway full sovereignty over Svalbard whilst agreeing that any signatory state could utilize its natural territorial resources (coal at the time). Thus, the area does not enjoy full sovereign rights.

After both states claimed their Economic Exclusive Zone, Norway established a Fisheries Protection Zone (FPZ) around the island of Svalbard in 1977 with the aim of not antagonizing the surrounding arctic states. Norwegian authorities continue to claim that the 200-mile zone surrounding Svalbard is not under the scrutiny of the 1920 bilateral treaty as it only mentions territorial land. As a consequence, only Norwegian authorities can harbour the natural resources in these maritime zones. The concepts of the continental shelf and the economic zone are legal frameworks that were established long after the signing of the treaty in 1920. Thus, Norway's claim is contested by several states, and Russia suggests that the EEZ can not be utilized due to the 1920s treaty, and is part of the High Seas.

In 2006, Norway delivered their claims to UNCLOS commission, and the final recommendation came in 2009. The commission concluded that Norway's continental shelf could extend beyond its 200 nautical miles. However, the commission did not raise issues around the treaty dispute. As a consequence, Norwegian authorities started to launch licensing rounds for hydrocarbon production in the maritime zones, which lead to a diplomatic protest by Russia. As a result, Norway has not explored the area further.

== Fishing disputes ==
Due to a decrease in national fish stocks and fear of increased levels of Illegal, unreported and unregulated IUU, Norway enforced its established regulation in the Barents sea, resulting in attempted arrests of Russian fishing vessels from 1998 to 2016.

All these attempted IUU arrests by Norwegian authorities escalated beyond the initial act of an arrest of IUU fishing which indicates the complicated nature of geopolitics in this area. Fear of such events escalating in the FPZ is of concern for Norwegian authorities. Moreover, Russian authorities deemed the FZP zone around Svalbard a potential area for future conflict with NATO p 101)

Norway claims that as the Snow Crabs are sedimentary species and as Svalbard doesn't have a continental shelf, the Snow Crabs are a Norwegian resource. In 2015 Norway introduced a ban on fishing snow crab on its continental shelf, controlling who gets a Snow Crab license. The European Union (EU) disputed Norway's claims and in 2017 started issuing its own fishing licenses outside of Svalbard, even though the EU isn't a signatory to the Svalbard treaty. This resulted in the arrest of a Latvian and Lithuanian fishing vessel, and in 2017 a Norwegian court determined that the licenses granted to them were invalid. Norway has offered to exchange snow crab fishing licences in return for other fishing grants from the EU.

== Maritime cooperation ==
Despite legal and geopolitical disputes, Russia and Norway cooperate on several maritime issues. Joint management on fish stocks, oil spill management, search and rescue operations (SaR) and ship traffic coordination are all areas that the two countries have partly managed together.

== Joint oil spill management ==
In 1994, Russia and Norway reached an agreement on a bilateral contingency plan for oil spill management. This has been argued as necessary in the region as oil leaks in Norwegian waters will naturally drift towards Russian waters due to currents.

== Joint security exercises ==
Furthermore, Norway and Russia cooperate on joint security exercises, which previously has included border crossing with military personnel. Moreover, the Russian northern fleet is in possession of a direct line with Norwegian military bases in Bodø, which is utilized to prevent militarization and dispute escalation.

== Search and rescue ==
The first agreement between Norway and Russia on Search and Rescue operations was established in 1956, then updated in 1988 and 1995 (Bjerkmo, 2016). The collaboration on search and rescue consists of sharing information and mechanisms for support in the case of a request from.

== Coast Guard ==
After the fall of the Soviet Union, coast guard cooperation was established in 1992. Since then, INCSEA has been in force from 1992, which includes a vital protocol for ships and other maritime vessels in addition to aircraft in the Barents Sea.

=== Works cited ===
- Åtland, Kristian; Kabanenko, Ihor (February 7, 2020). "Russia and its Western Neighbours: A Comparative Study of the Security Situation in the Black, Baltic and Barents Sea Regions". Europe-Asia Studies. 72 (2): 286–313. doi:10.1080/09668136.2019.1690634. ISSN 0966-8136. S2CID 214369452.

== See also ==
- Norway-Russia relations
- Arctic Cooperation and Politics
- Geopolitics of the Arctic
