= Ocean Conference =

Ocean Conference can refer to:

- United Nations Ocean Conference
- World Ocean Conference
- Arctic Ocean Conference

== See also ==
- Arctic Ocean Conference
