= Arctic policy of South Korea =

South Korea's policies in the Arctic is South Korea's foreign relations with, and its attitudes and actions on issues occurring within the geographic boundaries of "the Arctic" or related to the Arctic or its peoples.

== interests of South Korea in the Arctic ==
South Korea has a permanent observer status. With the status, it will be able to participate in the work of the Arctic Council's six working groups that cover sustainable development, Arctic monitoring and assessment, persistent organic pollutants and others.

== Interest in Arctic resources ==
The Arctic Ocean contains about 25% of the Earth's natural resources and oil, which are still not found. This attracts countries like Canada, the US and Russia. Canada claims all the resources situated in the Northwest Passage as its rightful resources, as the resources come under its Exclusive Economic zone. On the other hand, the US feels that the Arctic Ocean is international waters and the resources should be used by all countries.

== Arctic shipping routes ==
The Arctic has become increasingly important to South Korea because of the possibility of quicker shipping routes between Europe and Asia as the ice in the region continues to melt. Currently, it takes about 24 days for a South Korean container ship to arrive in Europe. However, shipping routes via the polar region could shorten the trip to 10 days. However, these trade routes can only be used in the summer because almost the whole ocean freezes in winter.

== Location of South Korea ==
South Korea is located entirely outside of the Arctic Circle.

== Arctic research ==
South Korea spends more on Arctic research than the United States does.

== See also ==
- Arctic cooperation and politics
- Arctic Council
