= Joint Norwegian–Russian Fisheries Commission =

Norwegian–Russian Barents Sea fisheries

The Joint Norwegian–Russian Fisheries Commission is a bilateral fisheries management body run by Norway and Russia to control Barents Sea fishing, established in 1976.

During the Soviet Era, the main issues were quotas (for the three major fish stocks defined as joint stocks: cod (50%-50%), haddock (50%-50%), and capelin (60%-40% in favour of Norway), fish size and mesh size.

In 1993 the scope of the Commission included the compliance control, including exchange of catch data and inspections and coordination of various activities. This happened after it was revealed that after the dissolution of the Soviet Union Russian fishing vessels started delivering their catch to Norway rather than to Russia. However the catch data exchange failed to serve its purpose since late 1990s when Russian ships started to hand the frozen fish to transport ships heading to third countries.

With end of the Cold War the work of the Commission included long-term strategies for the fish stock in the Barents Sea.
