= Arctic Five =

Coastal states of the Arctic Ocean

The Arctic Five are the five littoral states bordering the Arctic Ocean—Canada; the Danish Realm, via the autonomous territory of Greenland; Norway; Russia; and the United States, via the non-contiguous state of Alaska.

Arctic five states

Competing narratives exist regarding international governance of the Arctic. There is debate over whether the principal actors should be the Arctic Five, the Arctic Council (the Arctic Five plus Finland, Iceland and Sweden) or a larger group of states. In 2008, the Arctic Five concluded the Ilulissat Declaration causing concern among those not invited. The Arctic Council is perhaps the most important of the bodies involved in Arctic governance. In a briefing note prepared for the 2016 Arctic Yearbook, Andreas Kuersten acknowledges a widespread view that the Arctic Five is usurping the Arctic Council's central position, but concludes that the two groups can complement one another in positive ways.

The politics and disputes in the region are not only negotiated through the Arctic Council, but also through bi- and multilateral cooperation as the Ilulissat Declaration within the A5. Another mention worthy example of cooperation outside of the Arctic Council is the Whisky War between two allies, Denmark and Canada. 1973 Denmark and Canada signed a treaty delimitating their border in the water between the east coast of Greenland and the western/northern coast of Canada. The border crossed right through Tartupaluk (Hans Island), a small uninhabited island. The dispute continued for decades, as the Danish and Canadian naval forces planted their national flags and placed a bottle of local liquor on the island occasionally. By 2022 both countries signed a deal splitting the island in half and ending the dispute peacefully.

== The Arctic Council and the Arctic Five ==
The Arctic Council consists of eight member states including the A5. The council was formally established on 19 September 1996 with the signing of the Ottawa Declaration by the United States, Canada, Denmark, Iceland, Norway, Sweden, Finland, and Russia. Today the council furthermore consists of six permanent participant groups representing the indigenous people in the arctic and 38 observers, of which 13 are non-arctic observation states, including states as India, China, The Netherlands etc.

The signing of the Ilulissat Declaration and the exclusion of the other members and participant groups created a strong reaction from the excluded members of the Arctic Council. Following the incident the remaining Arctic states strengthen their collaboration with other partners, as Island deepened their relationship with China, Sweden initiated a conference at the Nordic Council named "Common Concern for the Arctic", and Finland encouraged the European Union's candidacy as a permanent observer of the Arctic Council. According to scholar Klaus Dodds, this divisiveness between the A5 and the remaining arctic states was later managed through further institutionalization of the Arctic Council, following the first legal binding agreement on search and rescue.

== The Ilulissat Declaration ==
"Two competing conceptions of the Arctic Ocean have circulated since the infamous planting of a Russian flag on the bottom of the seabed in 2007. Ideas of a "scramble for territory" depended on accepting that the Arctic Ocean was a "terra nullius" or belonging to no one." In the aftermath of the Russian flag planting in 2007, regional stability in the Arctic Ocean was challenged. The planting created headlines in international media and prominent politicians and ministers from the Arctic Ocean states reacted heavily. Canadian Foreign Minister at the time Peter MacKay stated, "this isn't the fifteenth century. You can't go around the world and just plant flags and say, 'We're claiming this territory.'" Even though the Canadians did themselves on Tartupaluk (Hans Island).

The planting created what some scholars refer to as "the scramble for territory", as the planting created a new era for dispute and fear for increased militarization in the region as states would once again compete for territory. According to a classical realist theory in International Relations, states are driven by self-interest and maximization of power, which in terms of interstate dispute could lead to armed conflict. The Russian flag planting fits well within this theory, as Russia tried to gain sovereignty on the North Pole, and thereby the sole rights to the resources in the area. On the opposite side, the Ilulissat Declaration was a step away from a potential escalation of the situation, with the A5 obligating to The United Nations Law of the Sea (UNCLOS) and peaceful settlement of territory in the region. According to another theory in International Relations, securitization is the movement of "normal politics" into the realm of militarization and interstate conflicts, whereas desecuritization is the movement back into the sphere of "normal politics". In the light of this theory, The Ilulissat Declaration can be viewed as a desecuritization act, as the regional instability was handled through democratic ethos (though criticized for excluding the remaining members of the Arctic Council) pursuing a peaceful solution to the situation and the commitment to international law and science.

The A5 were the sole partners of the Ilulissat Declaration, and by those means the spearhead for desecuring the situation in the Arctic Ocean. But as stated in the Ilulissat Declaration, the A5 will continue to work together in other forums, including the Arctic Council, which, as stated by Klaus Dodds, successfully managed to institutionalize the council and thereby providing continued cooperation in the region both within the A5 and the Arctic Council.

== The relationship with Russia ==
Prior to the Ilulissat Declaration tensions between the Russian Federation and the other members of the A5 increased, as growing military activity and even closer partnership among the western Arctic states created a potentially hostile environment trapped in a potentially "vicious circle", with the Russian flag planting being the pinnacle of the situation. In the aftermath of the Ilulissat Declaration, committing to UNCLOS, the situation stabilized yet again as the regional disputes went back into the realm of normal politics through the A5 and the Arctic Council.

After the Russian annexation of the Crimea peninsula tensions increased within the A5. In the period from 2000 to 2022 Russian military spending increased, and in 2014 by decreed of President Vladimir Putin, Russia created a new arctic military unit within its Northern Fleet. In 2017 the Russian Naval Regulation stated that Russia in near future would face "new efforts by other states, especially the United States and its allies, in trying to dominate the world's oceans including the Arctic" (own translation).

As of the 3 March 2022, all members of the Arctic Council except Russia decided to pause any further cooperation following the Russian invasion of Ukraine. The 8 June 2022 the members decided to resume the cooperation, limited only to some projects of which Russia was not involved.

According to some scholars, the Arctic Council has, until the current tensions with Russia and the other members of the council, succeeded in providing regulatory competence within the different national self-interests in the area. Therefore, the A5 members have no incentive to challenge the sovereignty of any other member, and thus providing regional stability. The most possible explanation for this is, according to scholar Olav Schram Stokke, that the Arctic nations gained the most from the settlement of UNCLOS, as it legitimized the A5 members interests in the region and provided sovereignty to a highly disputed area rich in natural resources such as minerals, oil and fish. But as climate changes occur, new opportunities for resources, but also new sea routes between Asia and Europe most notably being the Northern Sea Route, do so too, which could lead to new possible dilemmas and potentially new competition for marine sovereignty.

== Climate change and the new geopolitics of the region ==
As stated in the Ilulissat Declaration, "The Arctic Ocean stands at the threshold of significant changes. Climate change and the melting of ice have a potential impact on vulnerable ecosystems, the livelihoods of local inhabitants and indigenous communities, and the potential exploitation of natural resources." With the withdraw of the sea ice in the Arctic Ocean new opportunities occurs. As stated by some scholars, these new opportunities attract the attention of other fortune seeking nations including countries such as self-proclaimed "subarctic nation" China. In the last decade China has intensified its presence in the region, both scientifically, economically and militarily. China has established scientific research bases in both Iceland and Svalbard (Norwegian island) and several satellite bases across the region. China has made efforts in establishing a new "Polar Silk Road" with collaboration with Finland, and since 2015 China has deployed surface naval forces in the Nordic waters. Some scholars are even concerned with the potential risk of sub-surface Chinese activities under the sea ice in the arctic ocean. These activities raise concern by some, fearing the Arctic Ocean could be a new stage for especially US and Chinese rivalry. Other claim that the primary stage for US and Chinese rivalry is in the Indo-Pacific Ocean and will continue to be so in the future.

Several sovereignty claims have been made by members of the A5 in the Arctic Ocean, even among western allies. Denmark has made the proposal that the Lomonosov Ridge, a submerged mountain chain passing through the North Pole, is a part of Greenland and therefore a part of Danish territory. Canada claims the Lomonosov Ridge is a part of the Ellesmere Island, and Russia claims it to be a part of the New Siberian Islands. In total, Denmark claims to an area approximately 895,000 square kilometers in the Arctic Ocean north of Greenland, of which some is contested by both Russia and Canada. Canada, Denmark, and Russia have all submitted a claim to the United Nations Commission on the Limits of Continental Shelf (CLCS) for sovereignty rights for the North Pole. Russia received acceptance for their claim in 2023 by the CLCS, based on article 76 of UNCLOS. Denmark's claim to the CLCS is expected to be settled around the year of 2030, and Canadas is still until further notice.

== Meetings of the Arctic Five ==
- May 27 – 29, 2008 in Greenland: Ilulissat Declaration. This meeting is known as the Arctic Ocean Conference.
- March 29, 2010 in Quebec: Chair Summary
- July 16, 2015 in Oslo, the Arctic Five adopted the nonbinding Declaration Concerning the Prevention of Unregulated High Sea Fishing in the Central Arctic Ocean, commonly known as the Oslo Declaration. Subsequently, in the "Five-plus-Five process", the Arctic Five plus China, the European Union (EU), Iceland, Japan and Republic of Korea signed the legally binding Agreement to Prevent Unregulated High Seas Fisheries in the Central Arctic Ocean November 2017 in Washington. The agreement came into force following ratification in June 2021.
- 2018 – 10-year anniversary meeting for the Ilulissat Declaration (including Sweden, Finland, Iceland and the Indigenous Permanent Participants).

== Bibliography ==
- Arctic Council, Timeline (last seen 25 May 2024)
- Arctic Council, Observers (last seen 25 May 2024)
- Auerswald, David P. (2020). "Arctic Narratives and Geopolitical Competition". In Weber, Joachim (ed.). Handbook on Geopolitics and Security in the Arctic: The High North Between Cooperation and Confrontation. Frontiers in International Relations. Springer. pp. 251–271. doi:10.1007/978-3-030-45005-2. ISBN 978-3-030-45005-2.
- Banke, C., F. Hansen, M. Jacobsen, S. Kjærgaard, R. Nielsen, M. Olesen, L. Patey, C. Sørensen (2020). NYE SIKKERHEDSPOLITISKE DYNAMIKKER I ARKTIS Muligheder og udfordringer for Kongeriget Danmark. København, DIIS-rapport.
- Blunden, M. (2009). The New Problem of Arctic Stability. Survival, 51(5).
- Bueger, C. and Edmunds, T. (forthcoming). Understanding Maritime Security. Oxford: Oxford University Press.
- Commission of the Limits of the Continental Shelf (2021), RECOMMENDATIONS OF THE COMMISSION ON THE LIMITS OF THE CONTINENTAL SHELF IN REGARD TO THE PARTIAL REVISED SUBMISSION MADE BY THE RUSSIAN FEDERATION IN RESPECT OF THE ARCTIC OCEAN ON 3 AUGUST 2015 WITH ADDENDA SUBMITTED ON 31 MARCH 2021: https://www.un.org/depts/los/clcs_new/submissions_files/rus01_rev15/2023RusRev1RecSum.pdf
- Dauylbayev A, Yelmurzayeva R, Kamaljanova T and Ibragimova G (2024). The ambivalence of the implementation of the US arctic policy: integrating and disintegration factors of the allies. Front. Polit. Sci.
- Dodds, K. (2013). "The Ilulissat Declaration (2008): The Arctic States, ‘Law of the Sea," and Arctic Ocean." The SAIS review of international affairs, 33(2).
- Hønneland, Geir (2016). Russia and the Arctic:Environment, Identity and Foreign Policy. I.B.Tauris. ISBN 978-0-85772-746-6.
- Jacobsen, M., & Strandsbjerg, J. (2017). Desecuritization as Displacement of Controversy: geopolitics, law and sovereign rights in the Arctic. Politik, 20(3).
- R. Tamnes and K. Offerdal (2014), Geopolitics in the Arctic. Regional Dynamics in a Global World. Routledge.
- Rayfuse, Rosemary (2018). "Regulating Fisheries in the Central Arctic Ocean: Much Ado About Nothing?". In Vestergaard, Niels; Kaiser, Brooks A.; Fernandez, Linda; Larsen, Joan Nymand (eds.). Arctic Marine Resource Governance and Development. Springer Polar Sciences. Springer. doi:10.1007/978-3-319-67365-3. ISBN 978-3-319-67365-3.
- Stokke, O. S. (2014). "International Environmental governance and the Arctic Council" In R. Tamnes and K. Offerdal (eds), Geopolitics in the Arctic. Regional Dynamics in a Global World. Routledge
- Udenrigsministeriet (Danish Ministry for Foreign Affairs), The Ilulissat Declaration via: https://um.dk/udenrigspolitik/lande-og-regioner/arktisk-portal/fakta-om-arktis/internationalt-samarbejde-om-arktis (accessed 25 May 2024)
- Wæver, O. (1995). Securitization and Desecurization. In: R. D. Lipschutz (ed.). On Security. New York: Columbia University Press.
