= Natural resources of the Arctic =

The natural resources of the Arctic are the mineral and animal natural resources which provide or have potential to provide utility or economic benefit to humans. The Arctic contains significant amounts of minerals, boreal forests, marine life, and fresh water.

== Hydrocarbons ==
The United States Geological Survey estimates that 22 percent of the world's oil and natural gas could be located beneath the Arctic.

Russia's undiscovered petroleum is estimated between 67 billion tons of oil equivalent (BTOE) according to the United States Geological Survey and 142 BTOE according to the Russian Academy of Sciences (in 2011, the world consumed 13 BTOE of energy, 31% from oil and 21% from natural gas). Russia's vast energy resources account for 52% of the Arctic totals and Norway's for 12%. Norway, which has been extracting petroleum in the North Sea since the 1970s, in the 2010s expected new discoveries in the Barents Sea. As of 2013 Russia was exporting 88% of crude oil via pipelines, with a large majority of the natural gas also transported in that manner. 76% of natural gas and 79% of oil were exported to Europe, with the second largest customer for oil being China and for natural gas being Japan. Russia continued to expand both its pipeline networks and its seaborne capacity, with absolute maritime transportation of petroleum growing but remaining a small portion of the overall exports.

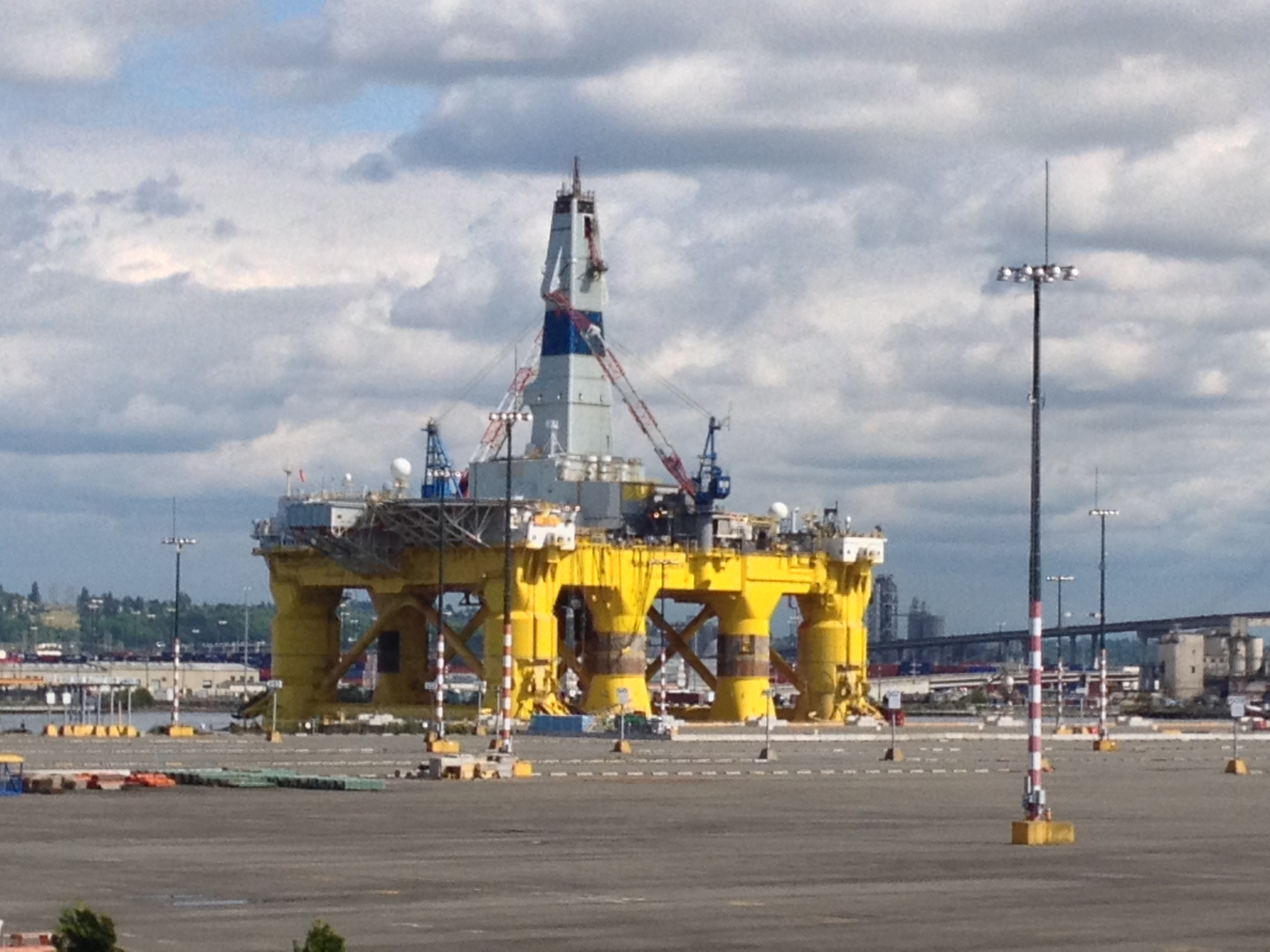
Polar Pioneer oil drilling rig

== Mining ==
The Arctic holds large quantities of minerals, including phosphate, bauxite, iron ore, copper, nickel, and diamond. These are of pervasive use in industrialized economies. Russia produces an average of 11 M tons of phosphates, 8% of the global output. Phosphates are used as fertilizers in agriculture, with other uses including water treatment, flame-retardant materials, and corrosion protection. In 2010, Russia also extracted and processed bauxite into 3.85 M tons of aluminum, constituting 9.3% of the global production and making it the second-largest producer in the world after China. It also mined 100 M tons of iron ore, 6.25% of the global production.

The largest Russian mining company Nornickel leads the world's production of nickel and palladium as a by-product. Nickel is an important metal used in the production of steel and other industrial, commercial, and consumer goods. The company has its own fleet of vessels to ship out the minerals and also owns port terminals. Worldwide production of nickel was of 1.5 M tons in 2011, out of which 297,000 tons was mined by Nornickel, holding 5.8 M more in proven reserves (2010 figures). Palladium is mostly used in engines as a catalyst converting 90% of highly harmful exhaust gasses into less harmful ones. The company is also a major producer of copper (mining 389,000 tons out of 8.7 M tons worldwide), platinum, rhodium, and cobalt. In anticipation of a growth in demand for government icebreaker services, Nornickel started in 2006 to order the construction of its own fleet of five icebreaking cargo vessels, in operation as of 2014. These vessels are capable of breaking through 1.5 m (5 ft) of ice at a rate of 1–2 knots, without the support of an icebreaker, while transporting 14,500 tons of cargo.

Large Arctic mines include Red Dog mine (zinc) in Alaska, Diavik Diamond Mine in Northwest Territories, Canada, and Sveagruva in Svalbard. Large mines under development are Baffinland Iron Mine in Nunavut, and Isua Iron Mine in Greenland.

Gold mining in Alaska is widespread. Fort Knox Gold Mine is the largest producer of gold in the history of Alaska.

== Fisheries ==
The range of some sub-Arctic fish stocks is likely to extend into Arctic areas due to climate change, and decreasing ice-cover will likely lead to more fishing activity.

In the area of the Arctic north of the Atlantic, extensive commercial fisheries and international managerial mechanisms already exist. North of the Bering Strait, there are currently no significant commercial fisheries and no international management mechanisms.

== Fresh water ==
Greenland holds about 10% of the world's fresh water reserves.

== Hydropower ==
The often mountainous areas and the low population density means that the villages in the Arctic often are self suppliant on electricity through hydropower. Some places still use oil for electricity generation and heating.

== See also ==
- List of mines in the Northwest Territories
- Category:Mines in Nunavut
- Category:Mines in Yukon
- Category:Mining in Greenland
- Arctic Ocean § Animal and plant life
- Petroleum exploration in the Arctic
- Arctic cooperation and politics
