= Ilulissat Declaration =

Arctic inter-governmental conference

The Ilulissat Declaration is a document signifying necessary joint regional efforts and responsibilities in response to the potentially adverse effects of climate change with regard to the melting Arctic ice pack.

It was brought into force on May 28, 2008, by the United States, the Russian Federation, Canada, Norway and Denmark (the five coastal states of the Arctic Ocean, also known as the Arctic five or A5), following the Arctic Ocean Conference in Ilulissat, Greenland. The conference delegates discussed the Arctic Ocean, climate change, the protection of the marine environment, maritime safety, and division of emergency responsibilities if new shipping routes are opened. The declaration addresses the areas of "vulnerable ecosystems, the livelihoods of local inhabitants and indigenous communities, and the potential exploitation of natural resources", invoking a jurisdictional and sovereign-based approach to convey the responsibilities of the Arctic five.

== History ==
The increasingly concerning consequences of climate change in the Arctic, resulting in melting Arctic sea ice, have become ground for enhanced attention and cooperation in the region. Fear of economic exploitation and pollution in the Arctic Ocean was a key source of momentum in drafting and implementing the Ilulissat Declaration. Melting Arctic ice, exacerbated by climate change, has intensified concerns that economic activities in the area will further degrade the environment – thereby calling for renewed cooperation efforts and reaffirming territorial claims. For example, melting of the sea ice will lead to more Arctic shipping routes, such as the Northwest Passage, that could lead to economic exploitation in the Arctic.

The territorial dimension of the declaration was seen by many as a response to Russian explorers planting the Russian flag at the bottom of the seabed of the Arctic Ocean in 2007, just the year prior to the Ilulissat Declaration. This occurrence had a snowball effect in the media, with warnings of a scramble for the Arctic. Such depictions of intense geopolitical friction heightened the fear of territorial rivalry in the rapidly melting Arctic, from which arose the Ilulissat Declaration.

Furthermore, it was feared that a so-called 'governance gap', brought to light by the flag-incident, was further problematising matters, resulting in an international impression of disorder in the Arctic region – which the regional states realised would give ammunition for foreign states to try to make a claim in the area. Thus, the commitment of the A5 to the Ilulissat Declaration was also designed to act as an international indication and reminder that there was already "regional order in the Arctic".

Linked to the aforementioned fear of a perceived 'governance gap', another motivation for creating this declaration was merely to block any calls for an Arctic Treaty that would bring in new legislation and new states. The framework of regional governance is supported in the Ilulissat Declaration, stating that the existing legal framework – the United Nations Convention on the Law of the Sea (UNCLOS) – is to continue to be respected and kept firmly in place.

=== Participation in drafting ===
As the A5 only make up five of the eight members of the Arctic Council, this meant that the Arctic Council, as a complete forum, was not included – missing Sweden, Iceland, and Finland. Also excluded were Indigenous organisations such as the permanent participants of the Arctic Council, like the Inuit Circumpolar Council (ICC)

The 2008 Arctic Ocean Conference (where the declaration was drafted) was hosted by Per Stig Møller, Danish Minister of Foreign Affairs at the time, and Hans Enoksen, Greenlandic Premier at the time. The key ministerial level attendees included Sergey Lavrov, Russian Minister for Foreign Affairs, Jonas Gahr Støre, Norwegian Minister for Foreign Affairs, Gary Lunn, Canadian Minister for Natural Resources, and John Negroponte, American Deputy Secretary of State.

== Denmark's role ==
Denmark was the initiator of the Ilulissat Declaration, influenced by the Minister of Foreign Affairs at the time, Per Stig Møller. Following the Russian-affiliated flag affair, Møller made this statement in an interview about the whole incident:

"That was my biggest fear; the Arctic becoming a fait accompli. After all, in that context we are the weak nation. If someone would take the law into their own hands outside of Greenland and say: 'We will take this' and then e.g. drill for oil without asking for permission, what could we do? That is why I, as the Danish Foreign Minister, think of a joint initiative… It is not the strong one who needs the law. It is always the weak).

Møller instigated the meeting that led to the Ilulissat Declaration in an attempt to signal order and reassert control in the Arctic region. The Minister of Foreign Affairs justified the purely state-based composition of the declaration, excluding groups such as the ICC, by stating that the five coastal states were the ones pivotal in communicating a unified political stance, both regionally and internationally, and that the UNCLOS was the adequate structure through which to take responsible future actions.

== Contents of the Ilulissat Declaration ==
The actual content of the Ilulissat Declaration, as aforementioned, pertains to "vulnerable ecosystems, the livelihoods of local inhabitants and indigenous communities, and the potential exploitation of natural resources". The declaration specifies that cooperation should take the form of search and rescue capabilities, protection and preservation, and collection of scientific data. As elaborated in the document, cooperation between the Arctic Five already takes place, so this declaration acts as a reassertion of such roles and responsibilities which need to be taken seriously in the Arctic Ocean.

== Enhanced cooperation (A5) ==
In 2018, Greenland's at the time Minister of Foreign Affairs, Suka K. Frederiksen, and Denmark's at the time Minister of Foreign Affairs, Anders Samuelsen, decided to host a tenth anniversary of the Ilulissat Declaration by hosting yet another event in Ilulissat, Greenland. This was to reaffirm the enshrined principles in the Ilulissat Declaration and vow to continue abiding by them.

In the 2018 meeting, the previously excluded members of the Arctic Council were invited, namely Sweden, Iceland, and Finland, in addition to indigenous organisations part of the Arctic Council.

== The Ilulissat Declaration from an ocean governance perspective ==
Some academics have tried to explain why Denmark, despite being such a small state without an array of threats, has such an extensive maritime agenda by utilising small state theory. Small state theory claims that smaller states must compensate for their comparatively smaller capacities by collaborating with players on the international level in order to remain strategic and have a voice in important political matters. In the case of Denmark's activities in the Arctic, its geographical positioning automatically makes Denmark a key actor, which is conveyed by the Ilulissat Declaration which Denmark's Foreign Minister instigated himself.

The Ilulissat Declaration epitomises a regional maritime governance perspective. It was crucial for the A5 to assert this regional maritime power in the aftermath of the Russian-flag incident, as perceptions of a 'governance gap' led to an array of actors arguing for an Arctic Treaty in the likes of the Antarctic Treaty, which is based on an international approach. Through the declaration, the Arctic Ocean coastal states attempted to restate their legitimacy and power in the region, squashing any calls for an international approach.

== Critique of the Ilulissat Declaration ==
Initial critics of the Arctic Five claimed that the A5's exclusive cooperation in certain areas had the capacity to undermine other cooperation efforts that have overlapping aims – such as the Arctic Council (consisting of Canada, Denmark, Finland, Iceland, Norway, Sweden, Russia and the United States, in addition to the six Permanent Participants). Iceland, Finland, and Sweden's exclusion (the remaining states of the Arctic Council – the forum which was not invited to the Arctic Ocean Conference in 2008), in addition to the exclusion of the Arctic Peoples, added fuel to the fire and was seen as a form of exclusionary politics that collided with existing institutional provisions.

This critique was echoed particularly by the indigenous peoples of the Arctic, who were excluded. The state-driven nature of the Ilulissat Declaration was seen as questionable, and the signatory states' exclusive power to delineate the Arctic was especially contested.

However, this potential ground for tension has contracted since due to a refinement in the way that the Arctic Five is actually used – now primarily being seen as a supplementary forum to the Arctic Council and covering niche areas and topics not within the Arctic Council's confinement or capacities. This has supposedly diminished a competitive interpretation of the A5 with regard to the Arctic Council. The tension was also alleviated through the inclusion of the other Arctic Council members and indigenous people in the 2018 meeting.

In addition, initiatives taken since have included more actors – non-coastal actors – as conveyed by negotiations pertaining to fisheries in the central Arctic Ocean (Schatz, Proelss, Liu). Initiatives like this have reduced the initial competitive perceptions of the A5 by demonstrating the necessity of broader cooperation in the Arctic region.

== Current and future challenges ==
In addition to the worrying effects of climate change, acting as a constant source of pressure on actors involved in the Arctic region, there are other developments that have presented themselves as potentially acting as a particular challenge to the Ilulissat Declaration and the Arctic Five. One perceived 'threat' is that of China's increasing commercial interests in the Arctic. In an official white paper on China's Arctic Policy from 2018, China claimed to be a "Near-Arctic State", and thus has clear "economic interests" and maritime claims, stating that there is an incentive to build a so-called 'Polar Silk Road'. Such assertions have caused some concern for states that fear China may become too aggressive in the region and end up leveraging too much power in the Arctic, both physically and politically.
