= Arctic Ocean Conference =

2008 international conference

The inaugural Arctic Ocean Conference was held in Ilulissat (Greenland) on 27–29 May 2008. Canada, Denmark, Norway, Russia and the United States discussed key issues relating to the Arctic Ocean. The meeting was significant because of its plans for environmental regulation, maritime security, mineral exploration, polar oil oversight, and transportation. Before the conclusion of the conference, the attendees announced the Ilulissat Declaration.

The conference was the first ever held at the ministerial level that included the five regional powers, the Arctic five. It came at the invitation of Per Stig Møller, Denmark's Foreign Minister, and Hans Enoksen, Greenlands Premier in 2007 after several territorial disputes in the Arctic. States Møller, "We must continue to fulfill our obligations in the Arctic area until the UN decides who will have the right to the sea and the resources in the region. We must agree on the rules and what to do if climate changes make more shipping possible."

Ilulissat's melting glacier was an appropriate backdrop for the landmark conference. The key ministry level attendees were:

- Canada: Gary Lunn, Minister for Nature Resources of Canada
- Denmark: Per Stig Møller, Minister for Foreign Affairs of Denmark; Hans Enoksen, Premier of Greenland
- Norway: Jonas Gahr Støre, Minister for Foreign Affairs of Norway
- Russia: Sergey Lavrov, Minister for Foreign Affairs of Russia
- United States: John D. Negroponte, Deputy Secretary of State

== Controversy ==
The inclusion of some members of the Arctic Council while excluding others (indigenous peoples, Finland, Iceland, and Sweden) from the conference caused controversy.

Defending Denmark's decision to exclude certain council members, Thomas Winkler, head of Denmark's International Law Department stated, "This meeting in Ilulissat is not a competition to the Arctic Council. The issues that we're going to discuss will be issues that is [sic] the responsibility of the five coastal states of the Arctic Ocean."

The reaction by Aqqaluk Lynge, a Greenlandic politician and former president of the Inuit Circumpolar Conference, was concerned that indigenous peoples of the Arctic are being "marginalized". "Inuit have their own definition of sovereignty."

== See also ==
- Arctic Council
- Arctic Cooperation and Politics
