= Arctic cooperation and politics =

Between the eight Arctic nations

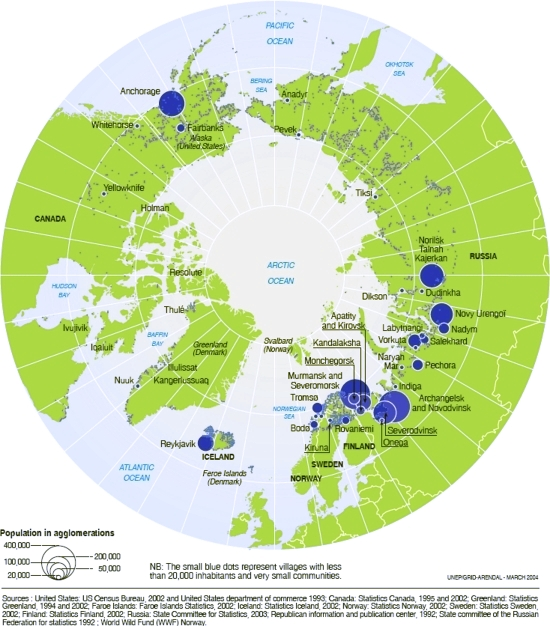
Arctic Population Map

Arctic cooperation and politics are partially coordinated via the Arctic Council, composed of the eight Arctic states: the United States, Canada, Iceland, Norway, Sweden, Finland, Russia, and Denmark with Greenland and the Faroe Islands. The dominant governmental power in Arctic policy resides within the executive offices, legislative bodies, and implementing agencies of the eight Arctic countries, and to a lesser extent other countries, such as United Kingdom, Germany, European Union and China. NGOs and academia play a large part in Arctic policy. Also important are intergovernmental bodies such as the United Nations (especially as relates to the Law of the Sea Treaty) and NATO.

Though Arctic policy priorities differ, every Arctic state is concerned about sovereignty and defense, resource development, shipping routes, and environmental protection. Though several boundary and resource disputes in the Arctic remain unsolved, there is remarkable conformity of stated policy directives among Arctic states and a broad consensus toward peace and cooperation in the region. Obstacles that remain include United States non-ratification of the UNCLOS and the harmonizing of all UNCLOS territorial claims (most notably extended continental shelf claims along the Lomonosov Ridge); the dispute over the Northwest Passage; and securing agreements on regulations regarding shipping, tourism, and resource development in Arctic waters.

The Arctic Council membership includes the eight Arctic countries and organizations representing six indigenous populations. It operates on consensus basis, mostly dealing with environmental treaties and not addressing boundary or resource disputes. (Although the Arctic Search and Rescue Agreement was signed in May 2011, the council's first binding document). A more robust Arctic Council with decision-making power on pan-Arctic resource and other issues has been proposed.

== Circum-Arctic cooperative organizations ==
=== Arctic Council ===
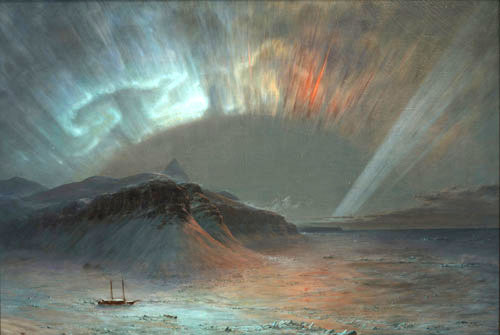
Aurora Borealis -- Frederic Church, 1865

Members include the eight Arctic countries: Canada, Denmark, Finland, Iceland, Norway, Russia, Sweden and United States. Permanent participants are these six indigenous groups:

- Inuit Circumpolar Council (ICC) The ICC is a multinational NGO representing the 160,000 Inuit living in the United States, Canada, Greenland, and Russia.
- Gwich’in Council International (GCI)
- Aleut International Association (AIA)
- Saami Council
- Arctic Athabascan Council (AAC)
- Russian Association of Indigenous Peoples of the North (RAIPON)

Arctic Council working groups:

- Arctic Monitoring & Assessment Programme (AMAP)
- Conservation of Arctic Flora & Fauna (CAFF)
- Emergency Prevention, Preparedness & Response (EPPR)
- Protection of the Arctic Marine Environment (PAME)
- Sustainable Development Working Group (SDWG)
- Arctic Contaminants Action Program (ACAP)

In Tromsø, Norway on April 29, 2009, Arctic Council ministers approved a task force to create an international Search & Rescue (SAR) instrument for the Arctic by the next meeting in 2011. In Nuuk, Greenland on May 12, 2011, ministers signed a Search & Rescue agreement, the Arctic Council's first law-bound treaty.

At the Arctic Council ministerial meeting on April 24, 2015, a Task Force on Arctic Marine Cooperation was created to consider future needs for cooperation on Arctic marine issues.

=== Conference of Parliamentarians of the Arctic Region ===
Conference of Parliamentarians of the Arctic Region (CPAR) is a parliamentary body comprising delegations appointed by the national parliaments of the Arctic states (Canada, Denmark, Finland, Iceland, Norway, Russia, Sweden, and the United States) and the European Parliament. The conference also includes Indigenous peoples groups as Permanent Participants, and observers. The conference meets every two years. Between conferences the Arctic parliamentary cooperation is carried on by a Standing Committee of Parliamentarians of the Arctic Region, which started its activities in 1994.

=== The five Arctic Ocean coastal states ===
Foreign ministers of the five Arctic Ocean coastal states (Russia, US, Canada, Norway, and Denmark (Greenland)) met:

- May 27 – 29, 2008 in Greenland: Ilulissat Declaration. This meeting is known as the Arctic Ocean Conference.
- March 29, 2010 in Quebec: Chair Summary

=== International Maritime Organization ===
The International Maritime Organization (IMO) was established in 1948 to develop and maintain a comprehensive regulatory framework for shipping. The IMO spent years negotiating an Arctic Code for shipping, but for many years, the Code was only set of voluntary Guidelines for Ships Operating in Arctic Ice-Covered Waters (adopted in 2002). The Guidelines provide uniform safety, pollution prevention, and security standards for ocean carriers. However, on 1 January 2017, the International Code for Ships Operating in Polar Waters entered into force and is mandatory for all ships in Arctic waters over 500 tonnes.

=== The World Winter Cities Association for Mayors ===
The World Winter Cities Association for Mayors (WWCAM) is a network of international winter cities that convene to discuss winter technologies, experiences, and implications for city planning under the guiding philosophy of “Winter is a Resource and an Asset”. The Association, formerly known as the Northern Intercity Conference of Mayors, was founded in 1981 by the city of Sapporo, Japan. As of April 2012, 19 cities from 9 countries participate as members. The seventeenth conference is scheduled for Sapporo in 2016.

== Regional Arctic cooperative organizations ==
=== Nordic Council ===
The Nordic Council is the Nordic inter-parliamentary body, while the Nordic Council of Ministers is the inter-governmental body. Members include: Denmark, Finland, Iceland, Norway, Sweden, and the autonomous territories of Åland Islands (Finland), Faroe Islands (Denmark) and Greenland (Denmark). The Nordic council provides a forum collaboration on political, economic, cultural and environmental issues and although it lacks legislative power it can influence policies through recommendations.

=== Barents Euro-Arctic Council ===
Barents Euro-Arctic Council (BEAC) is the forum for intergovernmental cooperation in the Barents Region established in 1993 to "provide impetus to existing cooperation and consider new initiatives and proposals". Members include: Russia, Norway, Denmark, Iceland, Finland, Sweden and Commission of European Communities.

=== Pacific Northwest Economic Region: Arctic Caucus ===
The Pacific Northwest Economic Region (PNWER) Arctic Caucus formed informally in November 2010 as a loose alliance between Alaska and the Canadian Territories of Northwest Territories and the Yukon. Members include legislators, government officials, business and nonprofit leaders. The Caucus met in December 2010 in Barrow, Alaska; in Portland, Oregon in July 2011; and in Yellowknife, Northwest Territories in August 2011.

=== Northern Forum ===
The Northern Forum is a non-profit, international organization composed of sub-national or regional governments from eight northern countries. The Forum's mission is to improve the quality of life of Northern peoples by using leadership networking to tackle common problems; and to support sustainable development and cooperative socio-economic initiatives.

=== Youth Arctic Coalition ===
The Youth Arctic Coalition is a non-profit, international, youth organization that was created to bridge the gap between youth living in all parts of the Arctic. The YAC has membership in the eight Arctic states, and is supported by youth, organizations, and governments from around the world. In 2014, the YAC hosted its inaugural conference in Ottawa, which brought together over 200 youth from across the Arctic.

== Arctic policies of select countries ==
=== United States of America (Alaska) ===
Main goals in U.S. Arctic Policy are: National security; Protecting the Arctic environment and wildlife; Ensuring economic development is environmentally sustainable; Strengthening cooperative institutions among the eight Arctic countries; Including the Arctic's indigenous communities in decisions; and Improving scientific monitoring and research.

On January 9, 2009, President Bush signed National Security Presidential Directive (NSPD)-66 on Arctic Region Policy, a collaborative effort replacing the Clinton era Arctic policy directive. NSPD-66 is currently the active Arctic policy playbook being pursued by the Obama Administration and its Departments.

The U.S. Arctic Policy Group is a federal interagency working group comprising those agencies with programs and/or involvement in research and monitoring, land and natural resources management, environmental protection, human health, transportation and policy making in the Arctic. The APG is chaired by the U.S. Department of State and meets monthly to develop and implement U.S. programs and policies in the Arctic, including those relevant to the activities of the Arctic Council.

State Department's Office of Ocean and Polar Affairs (OPA) is a part of the State Department's Bureau of Oceans and International Environmental and Scientific Affairs (OES). OPA is responsible for formulating and implementing U.S. policy on international issues concerning the oceans, the Arctic, and Antarctica.

=== Canada (NWT, Nunavut, and Yukon) ===
Canada has more Arctic land mass than any country. On August 23, 2010, Canada's Prime Minister Stephen Harper said protection of Canada's sovereignty over its northern regions was its number one and "non-negotiable priority" in Arctic policy. Canada has slated $109 million, to be spent before 2014, for research to substantiate extended continental shelf claims. Canada's Arctic policy priorities are: to try to resolve boundary issues; to secure international recognition for the full extent of Canada's extended continental shelf; and to address Arctic governance and related emerging issues, such as public safety.

- Canada’s Arctic Foreign Policy Pamphlet
- Statement on Canada's Arctic foreign policy: Exercising sovereignty and promoting Canada's Northern Strategy abroad

G-7 finance ministers met in Nunavut in February 2010.

- Canada's Northern Strategy

=== Norway ===
The Norwegian Polar Institute in Tromsø is hosting the Arctic Council Secretariat from 2007 to 2013.

- The Norwegian Government's Strategy for the High North (2.21.07)

=== Sweden ===
On September 29, 2020 Swedish Foreign Minister Ann Linde lead a press conference for the release of Sweden's Strategy for the Arctic Region produced by the Government Offices of Sweden.

- Government Offices of Sweden Strategy for the Arctic Region

=== Finland ===
The Finnish Arctic Strategy was released June 4, 2010 and concentrates on seven priority areas: security, environment, economy, infrastructure, arctic indigenous residents, institutions, and the European Union.

=== Russia ===
In 2007, Russia planted a flag on the Arctic Ocean seafloor beneath the North Pole while performing research to substantiate its claim to an extended continental shelf. The flag planting was perceived erroneously to be a land claim—a claim Canada and other Arctic countries rebuked even though the Russian Government clearly stated that no such claim was made. In 2009, a Russian government policy document cited western reports of a potential for military conflict over Arctic resources. Despite having lost 18 percent of its population between 1989 and 2002, the Russian Arctic comprises 25% of Russia's landmass and still contains 80 percent of the four million people who inhabit the planet's Arctic region. Russia's current Arctic policy is contained in the document "Basics of Russian Federation State Policy for the Arctic Through 2020 and Beyond" signed on 18 September 2008 by Russian President (now Prime Minister) Medvedev. This policy document addresses various issues tied to the protection and development of the land and offshore waters of Russia's Arctic sector.

=== European Union ===
If accession of Iceland to the European Union occurs, the EU will increase its Arctic influence and possibly gain permanent observer status in the Arctic Council. The Northern Dimension of European Union policy, established in the late 1990s, intended to deal with issues concerning western Russia, as well as to increase general cooperation among the EU, Iceland and Norway. It has since become a multilateral, equal partnership among the EU, Iceland, Norway and Russia. Canada and the United States are observers to the partnership. Three Nordic Council members have joined the EU (Denmark in 1973 and Sweden & Finland in 1995). The European Union's application to become a “permanent observer” in the Arctic Council was blocked in 2009 by Canada in response to the EU's ban on the importation of seal products.

=== China ===
China's ice capable research vessel, Xue Long, sailed the Northwest Passage in August 2012. China is interested in Arctic resources and shipping routes; and attained permanent observer status in the Arctic Council in 2013. China's presence in the Arctic is also marked by its self-description as a "near-Arctic power" in its 2018 Arctic Policy White Paper.

=== South Korea ===
South Korea has an icebreaker and is building another. The country is investing in LNG infrastructure near Inuvik, where LNG will be shipped from the Beaufort Sea and south through the Bering Strait.

== Other Arctic treaties and agreements ==
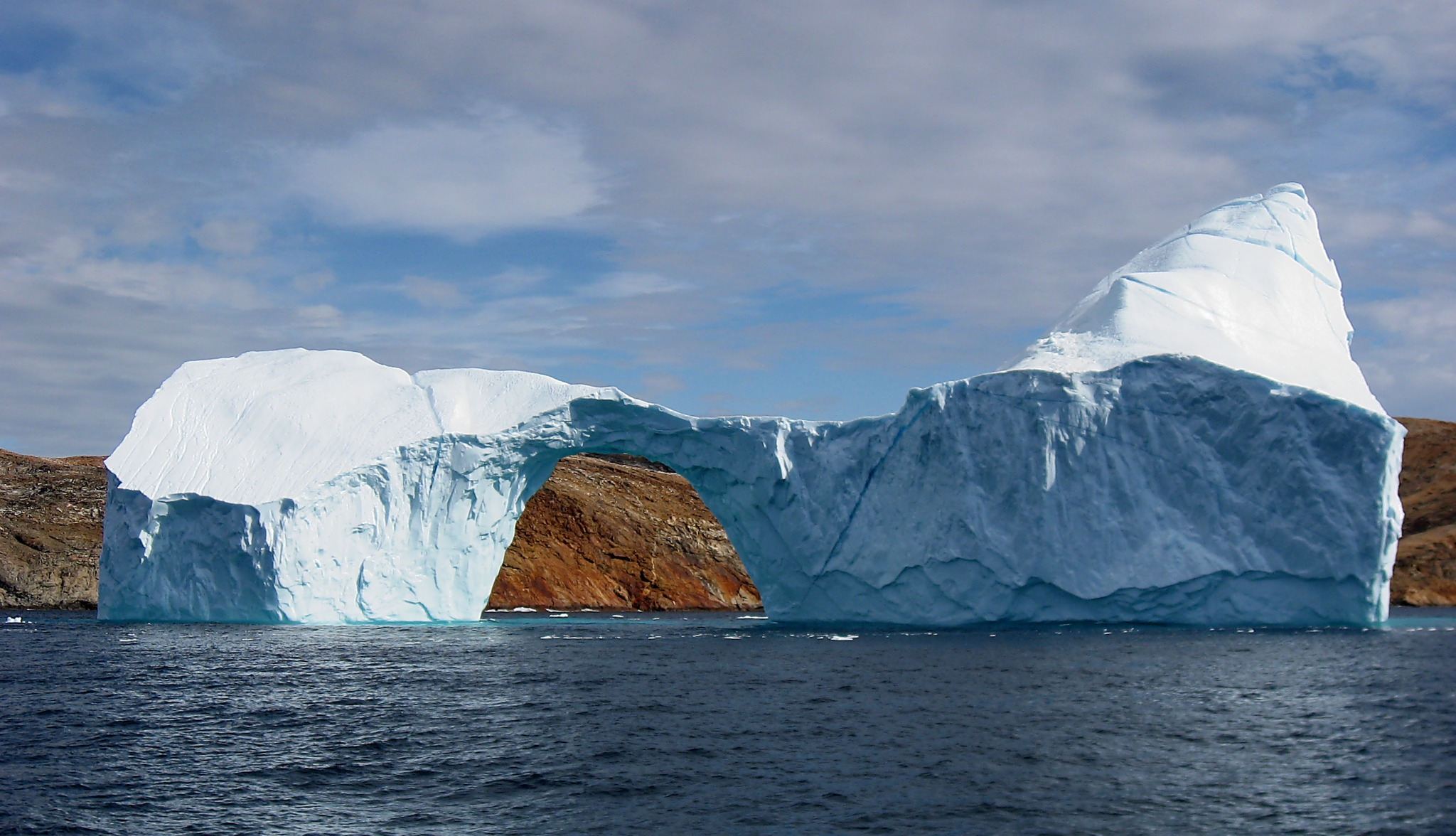
Iceberg between Langø and Sanderson Hope, south of Upernavik, Greenland

Other treaties governing all or part of the Arctic region:

- The Svalbard Treaty of 1920 among initially fourteen countries governs the political and economic status of Svalbard.
- The Arctic Cooperation Agreement of 1988 between the United States and Canada regulates bilateral cooperation regarding the Northwest Passage, but does not resolve the disagreement between the two countries about the legal status of the passage.
- The Arctic Search and Rescue Agreement of 2011, concluded by the Arctic Council member states, coordinates search and rescue in the Arctic.
- The Convention for the Protection of the Marine Environment of the North-East Atlantic
- The Barents Sea Border Treaty specifies the demarcation line between Norway and Russia in the Barents Sea.
- The Joint Norwegian–Russian Fisheries Commission
- The Agreement on the Conservation of Polar Bears

== Territorial claims ==
According to the United Nations Convention on the Law of the Sea (UNCLOS), coastal states have sovereign rights to resources in the water and seabed within a 200-mile Exclusive Economic Zone (EEZ). However, Article 76 of the Convention allows coastal states to extend their sovereign rights up to 350 nautical miles from their coastline if they can prove that the Arctic seafloor's underwater ridges are an extension of the country's own continental shelf. Governments have ten years following their ratification of UNCLOS within which to submit their claims to extended continental shelves.

In 2001 Russia was the first Arctic littoral state to submit its claim. The UN Commission on the Continental Shelf requested a revised claim with more scientific data supporting their claim, and Russia planned to file additional data in 2013.

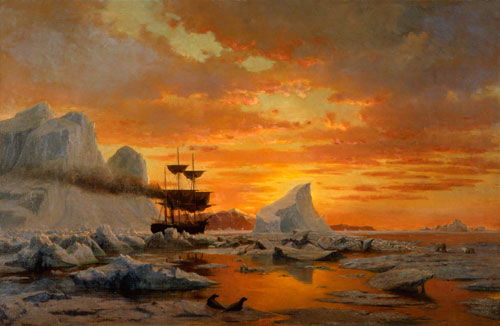
Ice Dwellers Watching the Invaders -- William Bradford, 1875

Denmark and Canada dispute ownership of Hans Island in the Nares Strait between Ellesmere Island and Greenland.

On April 27, 2010, Norway and Russia announced an end to their 40-year arctic demarcation dispute in the Barents Sea. Future joint energy development is expected.

Maritime boundaries between Canada and the United States in the Beaufort Sea and between Canada and Denmark in Baffin Bay remain under dispute.

Denmark (Greenland), Russia and Canada may have competing extended continental shelf claims over the Lomonosov Ridge, an underwater mountain chain crossing the central Arctic basin.

== Shipping and transport ==
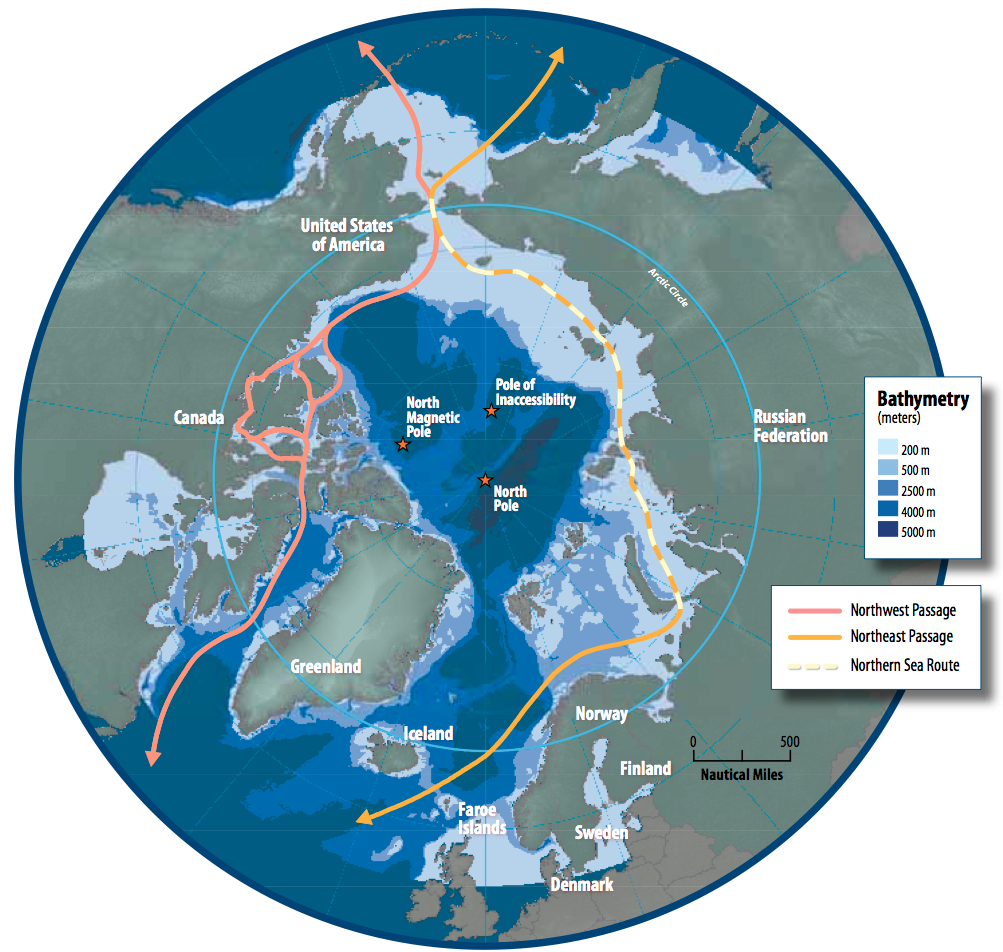
Map of the Arctic region showing the Northeast Passage, the Northern Sea Route within it, and the Northwest Passage

Global warming has had a greater impact on summer sea ice in the Arctic than previously estimated. Based on the recent studies, the Arctic will be largely ice-free during the summer sometime between 2020 and 2050. One 2011 Cambridge University study predicted that the Arctic would be free of summer ice by 2015. No models predict that the winter sea ice will disappear during this century.

An ice-free Arctic has major strategic and economic ramifications for global shipping, as vessels will potentially be able to traverse the Arctic Ocean. Trans-Arctic shipping routes could shorten distances between northern Europe and northern China by up to 4,000 nautical miles and reduce shipping times by up to two weeks.

All cargo ships in Arctic waters over 500 tonnes are subject to the mandatory requirements for safety and protection of the environment under the Polar Code.

== Arctic natural resources ==
The Arctic is rich in natural resources, including hydrocarbons (estimated at 22% of global undiscovered oil and gas), minerals like nickel and diamonds, fisheries (10% of world marine catch), and fresh water (10% in Greenland). These resources are becoming more accessible due to melting ice, attracting global attention.

=== Fisheries ===
Key Arctic fishery regimes include:

- The International Commission for the Conservation of Atlantic Tunas (ICCAT)
- The bilateral (Canada and the United States) International Pacific Halibut Commission (IPHC)
- The bilateral (Russian Federation and the US) Intergovernmental Consultative Committee (ICC)
- The Northwest Atlantic Fisheries Organization (NAFO)
- The North Atlantic Salmon Conservation Organization (NASCO)
- The North East Atlantic Fisheries Commission (NEAFC)
- The North Pacific Anadromous Fish Commission (NPAFC)
- The Norway-Russian Federation Fisheries Commission, and
- The Convention on the Conservation and Management of the Pollock Resources in the Central Bering Sea (CBS)

== See also ==
- Arctic Climate Impact Assessment (ACIA)
- Arctic Environmental Protection Strategy
- Arctic Strategy and Environmental Governance
- International Arctic Research Center
- International Arctic Science Committee
- Cooperative Institute for Arctic Research
- Northern Sea Route
- Northeast Passage
- Northwest Passage
- Arctic Bridge
- Nordic Council
- West Nordic Council
- Svalbard Global Seed Vault
- Territorial claims in the Arctic
- Arctic - Section: International Cooperation and Politics
- Bering Strait crossing
- Nordic model
- Nordic Investment Bank
- Natural resources of the Arctic
- Solar radiation management
