= List of Arctic research programs =

This is a list of Arctic research programs:

- Arctic and Antarctic Research Institute
- Arctic and Northern Studies at University of Alaska Fairbanks
- Arctic Centre, University of Lapland
- The Arctic Institute | Center for Circumpolar Security Studies
- Arctic Institute of North America
- Arctic Research Consortium of the United States
- Arctic Research Foundation
- Arctic Research Office
- Arctic Submarine Laboratory
- Arctic Technology Centre
- Association of Polar Early Career Scientists (APECS)
- Byrd Polar Research Center
- Canadian High Arctic Ionospheric Network
- Centre for Polar Observation & Modelling
- Circumarctic Environmental Observatories Network
- Cooperative Institute for Arctic Research
- EISCAT
- Flashline Mars Arctic Research Station
- Institute of Arctic and Alpine Research
- Institute of Arctic Biology
- International Arctic Buoy Program
- International Arctic Research Center
- International Arctic Science Committee
- Malaurie Institute of Arctic Research Monaco-UVSQ
- National Centre for Polar and Ocean Research
- North Greenland Ice Core Project
- National Snow and Ice Data Center
- QUEEN
- SCICEX
- Scott Polar Research Institute
- Surface Heat Budget of the Arctic Ocean
- United States Arctic Research Commission
- University of the Arctic

== See also ==
- List of research stations in the Arctic
