= Arctic policy of the United States =

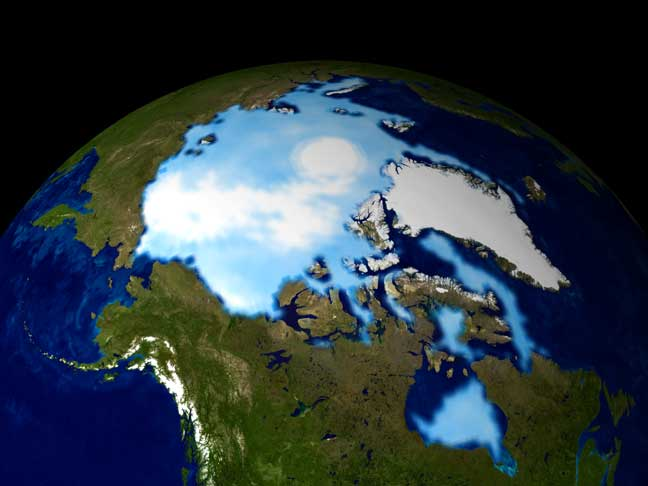
Alaska, America's Arctic, is positioned between Asia, Europe and the Eastern US - Barrow to Hammerfest, Norway (2631) is 1254 air miles shorter than Washington DC to Oslo (3885). Anchorage to DC is 3371; Anchorage to Tokyo 3461.

"Polar Sea" by George Curtis (1867 – same year US became an Arctic nation)

The Arctic policy of the United States is the foreign policy of the United States in regard to the Arctic region. In addition, the United States' domestic policy toward Alaska is part of its Arctic policy.

Since March 30, 1867 (when the United States purchased Alaska from the Russian Empire), the United States of America has been one of the eight Arctic nations and one of the five Arctic Ocean littoral countries. The United States has been a member of the Arctic Council since its inception in 1996 and assumed the Chairmanship (from Canada) in April 2015. 4 of the Arctic Council's 6 Permanent Participant indigenous organizations have representatives in Alaska. The United States is also an observer of the Conference of Parliamentarians of the Arctic Region.

Since 1880, the global temperature has risen 0.8°C; but the temperature in the Arctic has warmed twice as much, leading to much less sea ice coverage and greater accessibility to natural resources, transport passages and fisheries. Between 1971 and 2019 the temperature in the Arctic was three times higher than the increase in the global average during the same period.

The goals stated in the United States Arctic Policy released in NSPD-66 on January 9, 2009, are as follows: Meet national security and homeland security needs relevant to the Arctic region; Protect the Arctic environment and conserve its biological resources; Ensure that natural resource management and economic development in the region are environmentally sustainable; Strengthen institutions for cooperation among the eight Arctic nations (the United States, Canada, Denmark, Finland, Iceland, Norway, the Russian Federation, and Sweden); Involve the Arctic's indigenous communities in decisions that affect them; and Enhance scientific monitoring and research into local, regional, and global environmental issues.

On May 10, 2013, the Obama White House released the National Strategy for the Arctic Region, emphasizing three areas: advancing U.S. security interests, pursuing responsible Arctic region stewardship, and strengthening international cooperation.

Canada is the United States' closest partner in Arctic affairs, due to geographic proximity and similar Arctic policy directives. The countries work together on scientific research, including mapping the Arctic sea floor. Two significant disagreements are the border dispute in the Beaufort Sea and the legal designation (international or internal waters) of the Northwest Passage.

== Background and history ==
The current Arctic policy of the United States has its beginnings under President Richard Nixon. In December 1971, Nixon issued National Security Decision Memorandum 144 to address the United States' stance toward the Arctic. The memo suggested that the development of the United States' Arctic policy focus on three key areas: minimize adverse risks to the environment; promote international cooperation in the Arctic; and provide for the protection of security interests in the region.

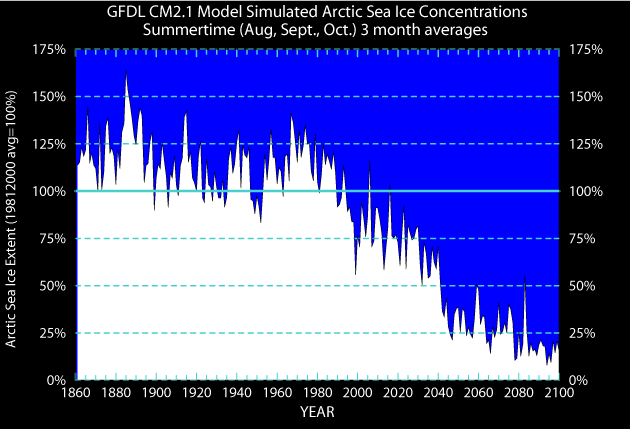
Summertime Arctic-wide sea ice extent simulated by the GFDL CM2.1 model for the historical period 1860 to 2000 and projected for the 21st century following the SRES A1B emissions scenario. Sea ice extent values are normalized (scaled) so that the average for years 1981 to 2000 is equal to 100%. Totally ice free summer conditions would equal 0%.

In 1984, the United States Congress passed the "Arctic and Policy Act of 1984" to provide for the national defense of the region, enhance commercial fishing endeavors, and fund environmental and climate research in the region. The United States remained largely quiet in the international arena with regard to Arctic policy until joining the eight other Arctic countries by signing the Arctic Environmental Protection Strategy agreement in 1991. The main purpose behind this agreement was to coordinate the protection of the Arctic region by: researching the various pollutants in the region and sharing the data; assessing the environmental impacts of development activities; and controlling pollutants and their effects on the Arctic environment.

In 1996 the United States signed the Ottawa Declaration and became a founding member of the Arctic Council. It added as footnote "The Arctic Council should not deal with matters related to military security". The Arctic Environmental Protection Strategy was absorbed into the Arctic Council following the Yalta Declaration in 1997.

In May 2008, five Arctic nations met to adopt the Illulissat Declaration, which recognized the 'law of the sea'. The participants were informally referred to as the "Arctic Five," distinguishing themselves from their national Arctic counterparts as the five shared borders with the Arctic Ocean. The US has not ratified UNCLOS and is the only Arctic nation yet to join, even though the Clinton, Bush, and Obama administrations favored ratification. At the March 29, 2010, "Arctic Five" meeting in Ottawa, United States Secretary of State Hillary Clinton criticized Canada for not inviting the other three Arctic nations or indigenous groups. The Canadian Foreign Affairs Minister, Lawrence Cannon, said the meeting was not intended to, "replace or undermine the Arctic Council".

The Arctic Council continues to be the United States' favored international forum for discussing Arctic issues, and the face of the State Department's external engagement in the Arctic. The US has also developed a national strategy toward the region that addresses security, natural resources, and claims of sovereignty in the region. This began in the Bush administration with the issuance of "National Security Presidential Directive 66" (NSPD-66) in 2009, and remains in effect throughout the Obama, Trump, and Biden administrations. NSPD-66's mission is to support the ratification of the United Nations Convention on the Law of the Sea (UNCLOS), promote participation in the Arctic Council, develop agreements with other Arctic countries on increased human activity in the region, and "continue to cooperate with other countries on Arctic issues through the United Nations (U.N.) and its specialized agencies." The policy argues against the need for a treaty among Arctic nations similar to the Antarctic Treaty restricting commercial and military activities. The policy calls for the US to "assert a more active and influential national presence to protect its Arctic interests and project sea power throughout the region," and to secure free passage of vessels through the Northwest Passage and the Northern Sea Route.

The diminishment of Arctic sea ice has provided the strongest impetus for a more assertive United States policy in the Arctic region. The United States focuses on numerous facets of the Arctic region in promoting and explaining their reasoning for a stronger policy position in the region. As an Arctic country with territory at stake, the United States is continuously pushing for a larger influence in the region to pursue industry and energy development considerations. One of the tenets of NSPD-66 is the ratification of the United Nations Convention on the Law of the Sea (UNCLOS), this would provide clarity and the appropriate framework for the United States to submit a claim to some area of the Arctic as the sea ice continues to melt. In addition, new passageways in commercial shipping may become available due to the breaking of ice.

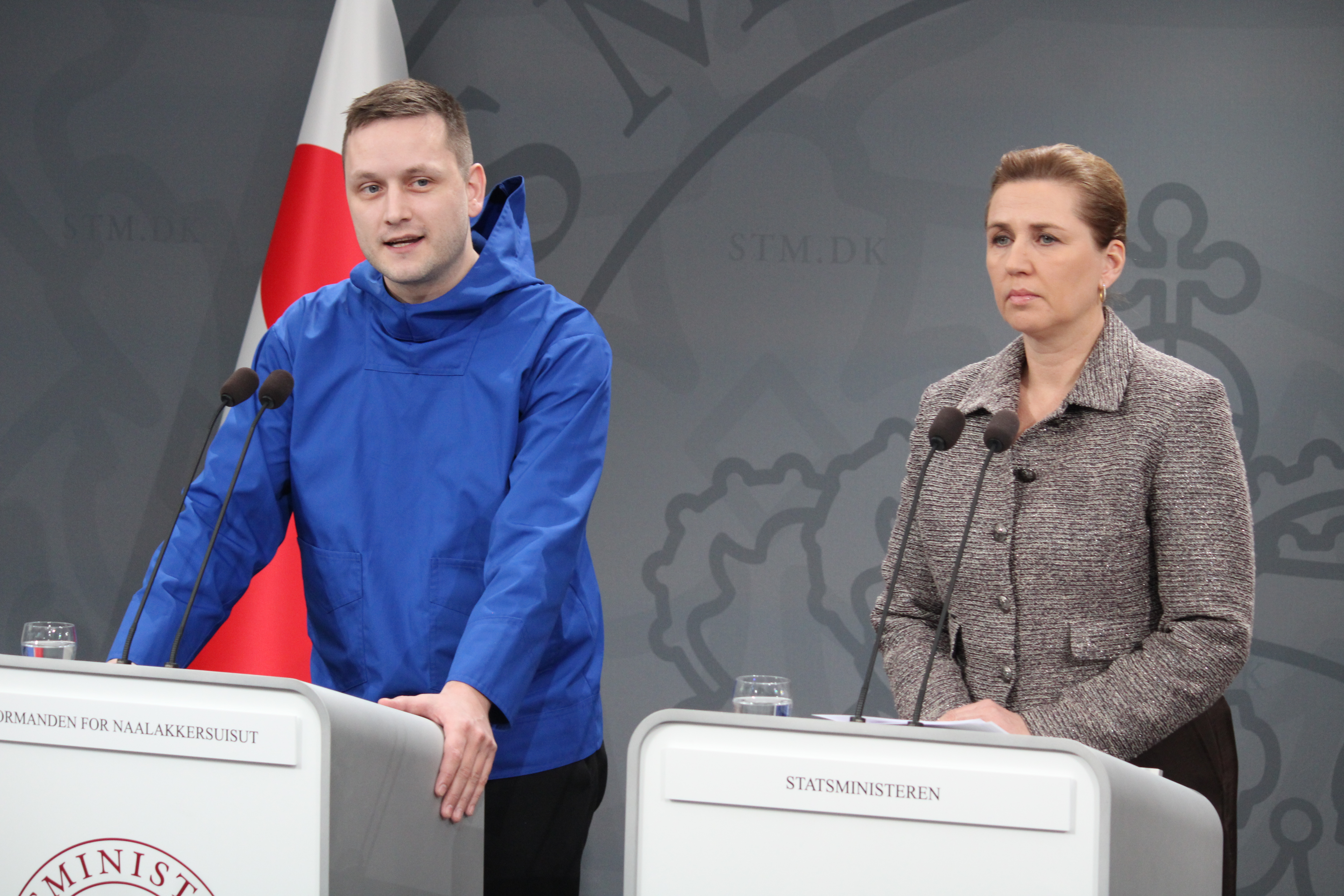
Greenlandic leader Jens Frederik-Nielsen announcing "We choose Denmark" at a January 2026 press conference with Mette Frederiksen in response to Trump's threats to invade or annex the country

The population influx in the Arctic region is also predicted to coincide with more commercial shipping, marine tourism, and the transportation of large passenger vessels. This poses coverage gaps to the US Navy and US Coast Guard search and rescue functions. Due to the non-military nature of the Arctic Council, the United States will also need to pursue separate military agreements with other Arctic countries to ensure a protected and secure region. In 2019 United States Secretary of State Mike Pompeo stated that circumstances had changed for the Arctic Council as "the region has become an arena for power and for competition. And the eight Arctic states must adapt to this new future". Then-President Donald Trump also made headlines for expressing interest in purchasing Greenland, even though it is an autonomous territory of the Kingdom of Denmark. Since 2025, the United States under the second Trump administration has several times sought to annex Greenland, an autonomous territory of Denmark (itself in the European Union), (Note: The Kingdom of Denmark has been a member of the European Union since 1973. Since 1985, Greenland has not been a member of the European Union but rather an Overseas Country and Territory associated with the Union, with Greenlanders, as Danish citizens, having European Union citizenship. The Faroe Islands is also an autonomous territory of the Kingdom of Denmark and is not part of the European Union.) triggering an international crisis. This escalated in early January 2026 after Trump refused to rule out the use of military force to annex Greenland and threatened a 25% import tax on European Union (EU) goods unless Denmark ceded Greenland. Trump's statements sparked a confrontation with Denmark and the EU (supported by several other NATO members), reigniting earlier concerns of a US–EU trade war. On 21 January, Trump reversed his position at the 2026 Davos conference, pledging not to use military force against Greenland or to tariff any European countries.

== United States executive agencies active in Arctic policy ==
The US Arctic Policy Group is a federal interagency working group comprising those agencies with programs and/or involvement in research and monitoring, land and natural resources management, environmental protection, human health, transportation and policymaking in the Arctic. The APG is chaired by the Department of State and meets monthly to develop and implement US programs and policies in the Arctic, including those relevant to the activities of the Arctic Council.

The Interagency Climate Change Adaptation Task Force was initiated by the Council on Environmental Quality (CEQ), the Office of Science and Technology Policy (OSTP), and NOAA in 2009 and includes representatives from more than 20 federal agencies. President Obama has called on the Task Force to develop federal recommendations for adapting to climate change impacts both domestically and internationally.

=== Executive Office of the President (White House) ===
The EOP is headed by the White House Chief of Staff. Entities within the EOP include: Council on Environmental Quality, National Security Council, Office of Management and Budget, Office of Science and Technology Policy, President's Intelligence Advisory Board, and others.

==== Council on Environmental Quality (CEQ) ====
The CEQ's Interagency Ocean Policy Task Force released its Final Recommendations on July 19, 2010. One recommendation was to create the National Ocean Council (NOC), which is co-chaired by the CEQ and the OSTP. The USARC, in conjunction with the Navy and under the aegis of the National Ocean Council, is developing an Arctic Strategic Action Plan.

==== Office of Science & Technology Policy (OSTP) ====
Congress established the Office of Science and Technology Policy in 1976 with a broad mandate to advise the President and others within the Executive Office of the President on the effects of science and technology on domestic and international affairs. The mission of the policy is to ensure that Federal investments in science and technology are making the most out of the contribution to economic prosperity, public health, environmental quality, and national security. It lightens up the process by which government programs in science and technology are resourced, evaluated, and coordinated. Maintain professional relationship between government officials and science representatives. This organization also co-chairs the National Ocean Council.

=== United States Department of State ===
The State Department's Bureau of Oceans and International Environmental and Scientific Affairs (OES) includes the Office of Ocean and Polar Affairs (OPA), which is responsible for formulating and implementing US policy on international issues concerning the oceans, the Arctic, and Antarctica. Julie Gourley at the OES is the Senior Arctic Official representing the United States at Arctic Council meetings. In 2011, the OES's Deputy Assistant Secretary David Balton was the lead US negotiator for the Arctic Council's search and rescue initiative. On July 16, 2014, U.S. Secretary of State John Kerry announced the appointment of Retired Admiral Robert Papp to Serve as U.S. Special Representative for the Arctic.

In September, 2016, the Department of State's International Security Advisory Board issued a report on Arctic Policy. The report calls for: 1) Continued U.S. leadership in the Arctic; 2) Speedy Law of the Sea treaty ratification; 3) Increased “presence” and “domain awareness”; 4) Increased and continued cooperation among the Arctic nations; 5) Adopting appropriate policies regarding Russian interests, policies, and activities in the Arctic; and 6) Strengthening possible ‘Transparency and Confidence Building Measures’ in the Arctic region.

=== United States Department of Defense ===
The US Navy's Task Force Climate Change released the Navy Arctic Roadmap in November 2009 and the Navy Climate Change Roadmap in April 2010. (Formerly The Navy had icebreakers, but now uses submarines in the Arctic.) Admiral Gary Roughead believes overfishing and melting sea ice are increasing the importance of the Navy in the Arctic. He also favors the United States ratifying the United Nations Law of the Sea Treaty “so we have a seat at the table’’ and so the United States could “expand its sovereign rights to the increasingly accessible outer continental shelf areas of the resource-rich environment of the Arctic.’’ Navy Rear Admiral David Titley was heavily involved in Arctic Policy.

The 2016 version of the DoD's Arctic Strategy defined the following "ways and means" in which the DoD will use its resources to achieve its arctic objectives:

- Enhance the capability of U.S. forces to defend the homeland and exercise sovereignty;
- Strengthen deterrence at home and abroad;
- Strengthen alliances and partnerships;
- Preserve freedom of the seas in the Arctic;
- Engage public, private, and international partners to improve domain awareness in the Arctic;
- Evolve DoD Arctic infrastructure and capabilities consistent with changing conditions and needs;
- Provide support to civil authorities, as directed;
- Partner with other departments, agencies, and nations to support human and environmental security; and
- Support international institutions that promote regional cooperation and the rule of law.

The National Defense Authorization Act for Fiscal Year 2020 mandates the establishment of a new strategic Arctic port.

=== DoD's current arctic strategy ===
The Department of Defense released an updated Arctic strategy in June 2019, which listed three national security interests: "The Arctic as the U.S. homeland; the Arctic as a shared region; and the Arctic as a potential corridor for strategic competition." The document articulated three strategic approaches to build on those interests: "building Arctic awareness; enhancing Arctic operations; and strengthening the rules-based order in the Arctic." Additionally, with the exception of the US Space Force, the service branches (Note: The Coast Guard is, in peacetime, a component of the Department of Homeland Security. Despite this, the Coast Guard is always a service branch and can be transferred to the Defense Department by the president in times of war) have all issued their own Arctic strategy documents in recent years.

=== Department of Commerce ===
The National Oceanic and Atmospheric Administration (NOAA) provides Arctic information and a set of indicators describing the current state of the Arctic ecosystem. NOAA predicts a nearly ice-free summer in the Arctic Ocean before 2050.

NOAA issued its Arctic Vision and Strategy in April, 2010. The Strategy delineates six main goals: to forecast sea ice, strengthen the understanding of science, improve weather forecasts, establish international partnerships, improve the management of coastal resources in the Arctic, and "advance resilient and healthy Arctic communities and economies."

=== Department of the Interior ===
The Department of the Interior has arguably the most extensive and diverse set of Federal equities and responsibilities in the region, including protection of wildlife and habitat, federal trusteeship for Alaska Natives, and leasing responsibilities for onshore and offshore areas suitable for mineral development and production. The total federal lands estate in Alaska is nearly equal to the combined area of Texas and Wyoming, all managed by Department of the Interior bureaus including the Bureau of Land Management, the US Fish & Wildlife Service, and the National Park Service. President Obama's Executive Order 13580 created the Interagency Working Group on Coordination of Domestic Energy Development and Permitting in Alaska chaired by the Deputy Secretary of the Interior and including many federal agencies. Part of the Working Group's mandate was to develop "a framework for making integrated Arctic management decisions" and present a report to the President by 12.31.12. The report, titled "Managing for the Future in a Rapidly Changing Arctic" included input from industrial and commercial stakeholders, the State of Alaska, Tribal governments and Alaska Native organizations, municipal governments, conservation organizations, and federal agencies. The report was released to the public in March 2013, and called for sustained high-level leadership from the White House on integrated Arctic management; a strengthening of key partnerships in the region with the State of Alaska and Alaska Native tribal governments and organizations; improved stakeholder engagement in important decision processes in the region; and more coordinated, streamlined federal actions in regard to science and management, environmental evaluations, and important cultural and ecological areas. The report was well received by the full spectrum of stakeholders in the region, many of whom made statements of support for this "call to action on a pressing issue of national importance." Alaska Senator Mark Begich described the report as "required reading for every member of Congress".

- Bureau of Ocean Energy Management, Regulation and Enforcement
- Bureau of Indian Affairs
  - BIA: Alaska Region
- Bureau of Land Management Fall of 2010 BLM drafted a plan for the entire National Petroleum Reserve–Alaska: 23,500,000 acres (95,000 km^{2}) of federal land.
- Fish and Wildlife Service
- United States Geological Survey
- National Park Service

=== Department of Homeland Security ===
The Coast Guard is a large player in Arctic maritime affairs. On May 21, 2013, the "U.S Coast Guard's Vision for Operating in the Arctic Region" was released. The Coast Guard's most current Arctic strategy was published in April 2019, titled "Arctic Strategic Outlet," and lists three lines of effort:

1. Enhance capability to operate effectively in a dynamic Arctic
2. Strengthen the rules-based order
3. Innovate and adapt to promote resilience and prosperity

=== National Science Foundation ===
The Office of Polar Programs (OPP) manages National Science Foundation funding for basic research in the Arctic and the Antarctic. The funds are provided as NSF grants to institutions to find any substantial results. OPP supports individual investigators or research teams and U.S. participation projects. Projects can involve investigators from many broad perspectives. OPP has two science divisions one each for the Arctic and the Antarctic. A third division manages the provision of logistic, support operations including field stations, camps, and laboratories. The United States is a leading nation in polar science, and research results have global significance.

=== Other U.S. executive agencies active in Arctic policy ===
The Department of Energy deals with pipeline issues and energy efficiency in Alaska.

The U.S. Department of Agriculture is active in Alaska through USDA Rural Development and the Rural Utilities Service.

The U.S. Environmental Protection Agency's Region 10 covers Alaska.

The U.S. Department of Health and Human Services includes the Indian Health Service: Alaska Area. Erosion and the melting of permafrost continue to present challenges. Some native villages are being forced to move, and the culture continues to evolve due to the changing landscape and the continuing migration of food sources.

The secretary of the U.S. Department of Transportation chairs the Committee on the Marine Transportation System (CMTS), a Cabinet-level partnership of Federal departments and agencies with responsibility for the Marine Transportation System. Public comment on the CMTS U.S. Arctic Marine Transportation System Draft Report was closed April 22, 2013. A final draft is being developed for consideration by the CMTS Coordinating Board.

== State of Alaska ==
=== Governor of Alaska ===
Because Alaska makes the United States an Arctic nation, the state is directly involved in much Arctic research, security, and policy. 90% of the state-funded portion of the budget comes from oil tax revenue—the fisheries industry is also very significant.

Governor Parnell delivered a speech at a US Senate field hearing on Alaska's role in U.S. Arctic Policy on August 20, 2009. The Climate Change Sub-Cabinet (created in 2007) advises the Governor on Alaska climate change strategy.

The Alaska Arctic Council Ad Hoc Working Group is chaired by the Alaska Governor's DC office and includes representatives of the US Department of State, the State of Alaska, Native organizations, universities, the private sector, non-governmental organizations and federal agencies in Alaska. It meets monthly and provides a consolidated Alaskan viewpoint on Arctic issues to the Department of State and other federal policymakers and keeps Alaska informed of US policy issues in the Arctic and Arctic Council affairs.

==== State of Alaska administrative departments ====
The Alaska Region, with USGS and Alaska Department of Environmental Conservation, hosts the Alaska Climate Change Executive Roundtable, a coalition of senior level executives of both federal and state resource management agencies from throughout Alaska that has been meeting regularly since the Climate Change Forum for Alaska in February 2007 to share information and facilitate cooperation among agencies.

The Alaska Department of Fish & Game assists with Arctic Policy in the concerns of Marine Environment Protection in the area of policy dealing with scientifically supported work groups. This department assists in controlling the amount of fishing to be done and when a season is to be opened or closed to protect the population of marine life.

The Alaska Department of Natural Resources' Division of Coastal and Ocean Management closed operations in July 2011.

The Alaska Department of Environmental Conservation's Division of Spill Prevention and Response (SPAR) works on the prevention, preparedness and response of oil spills within Alaska, including Arctic areas of the state. This team also assists in the conservation of arctic flora and fauna, protection of marine life, and sustainable development through the monitoring of oil.

The Alaska Department of Commerce, Community and Economic Development's Division of Community and Regional Affairs (DCRA) actively provides various forms of assistance to Alaskan residents, most notably in smaller villages including those in Arctic regions.

=== Alaska legislature ===
The Alaska Northern Waters Task Force (NWTF) was tasked with facilitating the creation of a joint federal-state entity to coordinate US and Alaskan interests that result from the warming of the northern oceans. The Task Force released its final report January 2012. Per the Task Force's recommendation, the Alaska Arctic Policy Commission was legislatively created April 2012, and held its first meeting March 23, 2012 in Juneau. The commission will carry on the work of the NWTF in more detail, and create an actionable Arctic policy for Alaska.

== Arctic research policy ==
=== Interagency Arctic Research Policy Committee (IARPC) ===
IARPC (U.S. Interagency Arctic Research Policy Committee) consists of fifteen-plus agencies, departments, and offices across the US federal government and is chaired by the National Science Foundation. The IARPC agency helps set priorities for the future of Arctic research. IARPC develops the US Arctic Research Plan and coordinates US research programs to support US Arctic policy. They work with Arctic Research Commission to formulate national Arctic research policies, discuss research programs and details for funding support. They write the five-year plan to implement national policy and responsible for the updates in policy. Coordinate multiagency budget documents and promote cooperative Arctic scientific research program. IARPC submits yearly accomplishments report to the congress.

=== United States Arctic Research Commission ===
The US Arctic Research Commission was established by an Act of 1984 (as amended, Public Law 101–609). Commission's main purpose is to establish the national policy, priorities, and goals necessary to construct a federal program plan for basic and applied scientific research with respect to the Arctic, including natural resources and materials, physical, biological and health sciences, and social and behavioral sciences and to recommend Arctic research policy, and to communicate our research and policy recommendations to the President and the Congress. They also work with National Science and Technology Council as a responsible agency that support cooperation and collaboration through Federal Government. Commission's also gives guidance to (IARPC) in the development of Arctic research projects. They also work on international level by interacting with international research organizations to obtain broadest view of Arctic research.

There are total seven commissioners appointed by the President. Four members are from academic institutions, two members are from private commercial activities in the Arctic and one member is the resident of the US Arctic. The Commission staff consists of an executive director, communication Specialist and Deputy Executive director. The Commission appoints advisers on as needed basis to advise on particular research projects. The Commission holds meetings and public hearings in Alaska to receive input. They also make site visits and field trips to the research facilities to acquire knowledge about ongoing projects.

=== Arctic Research Consortium of the United States (ARCUS) ===
The Arctic Research Consortium of the United States was formed in 1988 to identify and bring together the human and facilities resources of the Arctic research community in the United States. ARCUS created a foundation for important research, produces scientific reports with research community recommendations for arctic science priorities, and distributes information to the community. The purpose of ARCUS was to strengthen the foundations of Arctic research by providing leadership in advancing knowledge. It served as a forum for planning studies of Arctic research, acting as a synthesizer of the scientific information relevant to geographical location and encouraging the public to attain more scientific education that will provide more opportunities of research in Arctic. ARCUS was a non-profit corporation consisting of institutions organized and operated for educational, professional, or scientific purposes. The ARCUS headquarters and staff were located in Fairbanks, Alaska. It closed on September 30, 2025 following the loss of funding.

=== University of Alaska ===
- International Arctic Research Center
- Geophysical Institute
- Center for Alaska Native Health Research
- University of Alaska Geography Program
- Institute for Social and Economic Research
- School of Fisheries and Ocean Sciences
- Institute of Arctic Biology
- Arctic Energy Technology Development Laboratory

=== National Snow and Ice Data Center ===
- Antarctic Glaciological Data Center (AGDC)
- Exchange for Local Observations and Knowledge of the Arctic (ELOKA)
- NASA IceBridge
  - NASA's Operation Icebridge program works with the NCIDC to monitor the Arctic region. The NASA aircraft missions include mapping surface and bedrock topography, determining ice/snow thickness and analyzing sea ice distribution. The areas that are monitored in the region include, but are not limited to, coastal Antarctica, interior Antarctica, Greenland and southeast Alaskan glaciers.
- NOAA at NSIDC
- NASA Distributed Active Archive Center at NSIDC (NSIDC DAAC)
- Roger G. Barry Resource Office for Cryospheric Studies (ROCS)

== Arctic natural resources ==
The Arctic contains significant deposits of precious minerals, timber, and fish. Research plans to determine the extent of the US Outer Continental Shelf and the amounts of resources it contains is a primary directive of the US Arctic policy delineated in NSPD-66.

=== Environmental protection and conservation of natural resources ===
The Arctic environment is unique and changing. Despite the heavy research, the Arctic is still poorly understood. The need for sound scientific and socioeconomic information, Arctic environmental research, monitoring, and vulnerability assessments are top priorities. These priorities include sea ice and glaciers, thawing permafrost and coastal erosion, as well as the pollutants from the Arctic contaminating the region. As the temperature rises, contaminants locked in the ice and soils will be released into the air, water, and land. The increased human activity in the Arctic will lead to an increase of contaminants.

NSPD-66 policy states that for "environmental protection and conservation of natural resources, the Secretaries of State, the Interior, Commerce, and Homeland Security and the Administrator of the Environmental Protection Agency, in coordination with heads of other relevant executive departments and agencies, shall respond effectively to increased pollutants and other environmental challenges; continue to identify ways to conserve, protect, and sustainably manage Arctic species and ensure adequate enforcement presence to safeguard living marine resources; seek to develop ways to address changing and expanding commercial fisheries in the Arctic; and intensify efforts to develop scientific information on the adverse effects of pollutants on human health and the environment and work with other nations to reduce the introduction of key pollutants into the Arctic."

=== Oil and natural gas ===
The United States Geological Survey estimates that 22 percent of the world's oil and natural gas could be located beneath the Arctic. The estimate of oil availability to the US is in the range of 30 billion barrels while that of natural gas reserves could be 221 billion cubic feet.

=== Fisheries ===
The range of some sub-Arctic fish stocks is likely to extend into Arctic areas due to climate change, and decreasing ice-cover will likely lead to more fishing activity. Scientific understanding of Arctic fish populations is limited and needs to be studied before increased Arctic fishing occurs.

In May 2008, President Bush signed a joint resolution passed by Congress relating to Arctic Fisheries. The resolution stresses the need for the United States to work with other nations to conserve and manage future Arctic fisheries.

The NSPD-66 states,"The United States supports the application in the Arctic region of the general principles of international fisheries management outlined in the 1995 Agreement for the Implementation of the Provisions of the United Nations Convention on the Law of the Sea of December 10, 1982, relating to the Conservation and Management of Straddling Fish Stocks and Highly Migratory Fish Stocks and similar instruments. The United States endorses the protection of vulnerable marine ecosystems in the Arctic from destructive fishing practices and seeks to ensure an adequate enforcement presence to safeguard Arctic living marine resources."

The Arctic to north of the Atlantic, extensive commercial fisheries and international managerial mechanisms already exist. North of the Bering Strait, there are currently no significant commercial fisheries and no international management mechanisms.

The Arctic Fishery Management Plan went into effect December 3, 2009, closing the Arctic Management Area to commercial fishing.

== See also ==
- Arctic Cooperation and Politics
- United States Arctic Research Commission
- Cooperative Institute for Arctic Research
- Arctic Research Office
- Arctic Council
- Institute of Arctic Biology
- Arctic Refuge drilling controversy
- National Petroleum Reserve–Alaska
- United States non-ratification of the UNCLOS
- Ice Exercise
