= Arctic Research Office =

US Climate Change organization

The Arctic Research Office (ARO) a division of the National Oceanic and Atmospheric Administration (NOAA) run under the auspices of the Office of Oceanic and Atmospheric Research (OAR).

ARO is the focal point for NOAA's research in the Arctic, Bering Sea, North Pacific and North Atlantic regions.

In 1996, the Congress of the United States appropriated one million USD to support an Arctic Research Initiative within NOAA. In cooperation with the Cooperative Institute for Arctic Research, NOAA's Office of Oceanic and Atmospheric Research used those funds to support research projects in two principal areas: natural variability of the Western Arctic/Bering Sea ecosystem, and anthropogenic influences on the Western Arctic/Bering Sea ecosystem. Support for the Arctic Research Initiative is ongoing.

The office administers the funds from the Arctic Research Initiative. It represents NOAA on the Interagency Arctic Research Policy Committee, leads U.S. involvement in the Arctic Monitoring & Assessment Programme, and provides a point of contact between NOAA and the Cooperative Institute and Assessment Program and the International Arctic Research Center.

== Projects ==
=== Russian-American Long-term Census of the Arctic (RUSALCA) ===
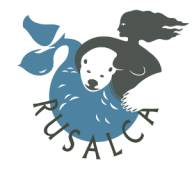
Logo

The Russian-American Long-term Census of the Arctic is a joint-project between the Russian Academy of Sciences and NOAA. This project supports the Study of Environmental Arctic Change (SEARCH) program and the Ocean Exploration Program.

- RUSALCA Initial Expedition to the Bering And Chukchi Seas (Arctic Ocean), July 23 - September 6, 2004.
- RUSALCA Cruise Photo Collection

=== Arctic Change Website ===
The Near-realtime Arctic Change Indicator Website provides information on the present state of the Arctic ecosystem and climate in historical context.

- Arctic Change website
- Arctic Theme Page - a comprehensive resource for teachers, students, decision makers, scientists and the public.

=== Arctic Climate Observing System (ACOS) ===
The ACOS project collects data from observing networks and uses that data to detect climate change activity. The observing networks are:

- International Arctic Buoy Program
- Arctic Sea Ice Thickness Network - consists of two types of sensors.
  - Standard sea-floor mooring technology is used to deploy upward looking sonar (ULS) to provide a view of ice thickness as ice drifts through the field of view of the ULS.
  - Ice-mounted buoys are used to provide direct measurements of ice thickness as it evolves over the seasons at a given point in the ice. The buoys also directly measure thickness of snow cover on the ice, temperature profiles from above the ice, through the ice and in the water column. The buoys also measure air temperature and sea level pressure.
- Arctic Ocean Observations Network - A component of a larger international effort. NOAA supports oceanographic moorings in the northern Bering Sea and the Bering Strait.

== See also ==
- Arctic Policy of the United States
- List of Arctic research programs
