= USS Chopper =

Submarine of the United States

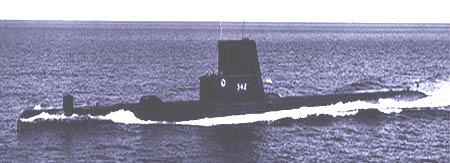
- USS Chopper (SS-342)

History

United States
- Name: USS Chopper
- Builder: Electric Boat Company, Groton, Connecticut
- Laid down: 2 March 1944
- Launched: 4 February 1945
- Commissioned: 25 May 1945
- Decommissioned: 27 August 1969
- Stricken: 1 October 1971
- Fate: Sank off Cape Hatteras, 21 July 1976, while being rigged as a tethered underwater target

General characteristics (World War II)
- Class & type: Balao-class diesel-electric submarine
- Displacement: 1,529 long tons (1,554 t) surfaced; 2,424 long tons (2,463 t) submerged
- Length: 311 ft 9 in (95.02 m)
- Beam: 27 ft 3 in (8.31 m)
- Draft: 16 ft 10 in (5.13 m) maximum
- Propulsion: 4 × General Motors Model 16-278A V16 diesel engines driving electrical generators; 2 × 126-cell Sargo batteries; 4 × high-speed General Electric electric motors with reduction gears; 2 × propellers; 5,400 shp (4.0 MW) surfaced; 2,740 shp (2.0 MW) submerged
- Speed: 20.25 kn (23.30 mph; 37.50 km/h) surfaced; 8.75 kn (10.07 mph; 16.21 km/h) submerged
- Range: 11,000 nmi (13,000 mi; 20,000 km) surfaced at 10 kn (12 mph; 19 km/h)
- Endurance: 48 hours at 2 kn (2.3 mph; 3.7 km/h) submerged; 75 days on patrol
- Test depth: 400 ft (120 m)
- Complement: 10 officers, 70–71 enlisted
- Armament: 10 × 21-inch (533 mm) torpedo tubes; 6 forward, 4 aft; 24 torpedoes; 1 × 5-inch (127 mm) / 25 caliber deck gun; Bofors 40 mm and Oerlikon 20 mm cannon

General characteristics (Guppy IA)
- Class & type: none
- Displacement: 1,830 long tons (1,860 t) surfaced; 2,440 long tons (2,480 t) submerged
- Length: 307 ft 7 in (93.75 m)
- Beam: 27 ft 4 in (8.33 m)
- Draft: 17 ft (5.2 m)
- Propulsion: Batteries upgraded to Sargo II
- Speed: Surfaced: 17.3 kn (19.9 mph; 32.0 km/h) maximum; 12.5 kn (14.4 mph; 23.2 km/h) cruising; Submerged: 15.0 kn (17.3 mph; 27.8 km/h) for ½ hour; 7.5 kn (8.6 mph; 13.9 km/h) snorkeling; 3.0 kn (3.5 mph; 5.6 km/h) cruising
- Range: 17,000 nmi (20,000 mi; 31,000 km) surfaced at 11 kn (13 mph; 20 km/h)
- Endurance: 36 hours at 3 kn (3.5 mph; 5.6 km/h) submerged
- Complement: 10 officers; 5 petty officers; 64–69 enlisted men
- Armament: 10 × 21 inch (533 mm) torpedo tubes (six forward, four aft); all guns removed
- Notes: Snorkel added

USS Chopper (SS/AGSS/IXSS-342) was a Balao-class submarine of the United States Navy. It was their only ship to be named for the chopper, a common name for Pomatomus saltatrix, an aggressive game fish. She was in commission from 1945 to 1969, her active career ending due to damage from a nearly fatal accident.

== Career ==
Chopper's keel was laid down by the Electric Boat Company in Groton, Connecticut. She was launched on 4 February 1945, sponsored by Mrs. G. S. Beebe, and commissioned on 25 May 1945.

Chopper sailed from New London, Connecticut on 4 July 1945 for Pearl Harbor, where she lay from 21 September-24 October. On 30 October, she arrived at San Diego, California, her assigned home port. She sailed on 2 January 1946 for the Philippines, where she trained and offered local services until 11 May, when she returned to San Diego and began local operations. Her next deployment – a simulated war patrol to China – took place from 28 July to 9 November 1947. After west coast operations through 1948, she departed San Diego on 14 March 1949 for her new home port, Key West, Florida, arriving on 4 April. Operations in Florida waters and the Caribbean Sea were conducted until 15 September 1950, when she entered the Electric Boat Company yards for modernization. She returned to Key West for fleet exercises and training on 23 May 1951.

Chopper departed Key West, Florida on 7 January 1952 for a tour of duty in the Mediterranean Sea until 20 May. She resumed local operations, then joined in North Atlantic Treaty Organization (NATO) operations in the Atlantic from 12 September-14 October. Frequent trips to Guantanamo Bay, Cuba, and local operations continued until 25 May 1959, when she sailed to join in special exercises in the Mediterranean before returning to Key West on 9 August. Through 1960, she continued operations off Florida and in the Caribbean Sea, often acting as a target for surface ships in training.

== Accident ==
On 11 February 1969, Chopper was participating in an ASW exercise off the coast of Cuba with Hawkins when her electrical power tripped off-line. Chopper was making 7–9 kn (8.1–10.4 mph; 13–17 km/h) at a depth of 150 ft (46 m) with a slight down angle when she lost power.

Within seconds, Chopper's angle increased to 45° down and her bow passed 440 ft (130 m) of depth. Because of the power loss, the officer of the deck could not communicate with the senior controller in the maneuvering room. Still, Ken Taylor, the senior chief petty officer in the maneuvering room, independently ordered both main motors back full. Despite the backing bell (an order for motors full astern), blowing ballast, and other efforts to regain control of the submarine, the down angle continued to increase, and within one minute of the power failure, Chopper was nearly vertical in the water, bow down. Chopper's bow is estimated to have reached a depth of 1,011 ft (308 m), her stern reaching 720 ft (220 m).

The crew's efforts began to take effect. Chopper lost the headway and started to make sternway. Her bow began to rise, reached level, and continued to climb. Chopper began to ascend with a rapidly increasing up-angle until she was again nearly vertical in the water, now bow up.

About two minutes after losing electrical power, Chopper shot nearly vertically through the ocean's surface. The entire forward section of the submarine, to the aft edge of the sail, cleared the surface before she fell back. Her momentum carried her down to a depth of about 200 ft (61 m) before she surfaced again, leveled out, and remained on the surface.

Chopper returned to port under her own power. Reports that she had experienced a "near disaster" appeared in newspapers starting on 18 February. Inspection discovered that her hull had suffered extensive structural damage during the deep dive and rapid ascent. Chopper was decommissioned on 15 September 1969.

== Later career and disposal ==
Chopper was re-classified, given hull classification symbol AGSS-342, and served as a United States Naval Reserve (USNR) dockside trainer in New Orleans, Louisiana until 1971, when the USNR Submarine Reserve program was discontinued. She was re-classified, given hull classification symbol IXSS-342, and was used for salvage and rescue training.

In 1976, Chopper was modified to serve as a tethered, submerged torpedo target for the submarine USS Spadefish (SSN-668). On 21 July, while Spadefish was on her final approach, Chopper began to take on water, broke her tethers, and sank.

== Fiction ==
In his book The Hunt for Red October, author Tom Clancy mentions the misfortune of Chopper in 1969 while discussing the fate of the fictional Soviet Alfa-class fast-attack sub E.S. Politovskiy. In Ice Station Zebra (novel) by Alistair MacLean there is a description of a sub that dives bow first far past its test depth, with the crew taking actions very similar to the ones taken by Chopper.
