= USS Hawkins =

Gearing-class destroyer

Coordinates: 22.7085680°N 120.2907658°E

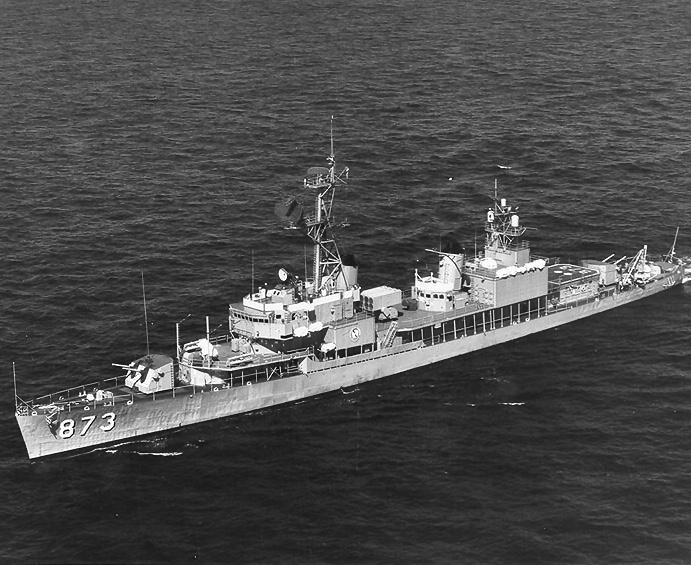
- USS Hawkins underway on 30 May 1965

History

United States
- Name: Hawkins
- Namesake: William D. Hawkins
- Builder: Consolidated Steel Corporation
- Laid down: 14 May 1944
- Launched: 7 October 1944
- Sponsored by: Mrs. Clara Jane Hawkins
- Commissioned: 10 February 1945
- Decommissioned: 1 October 1979
- Stricken: 1 October 1979
- Identification: Callsign: NBHG; Hull number: DD-873
- Motto: Nil Desperandum; (Never Despair)
- Nickname(s): Sea Hawks
- Honors and awards: See Awards
- Fate: Sold to Taiwan, 1 October 1979
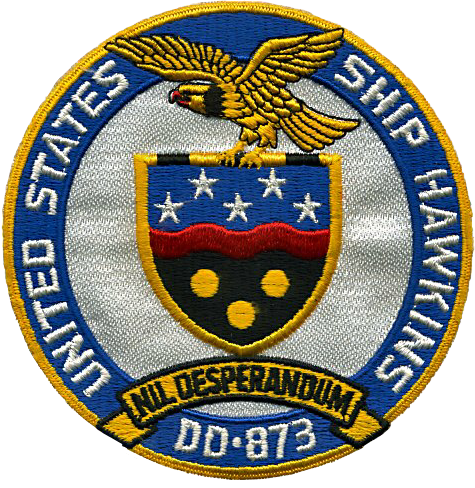
- Badge

Taiwan
- Name: Tzi Yang; (資陽)
- Namesake: Ziyang
- Acquired: 1 October 1979
- Commissioned: 9 July 1983
- Decommissioned: 16 October 1998
- Reclassified: DDG-930
- Identification: Hull number: DD-930
- Fate: Scrapped
- Notes: Bridge is at Zuoying Naval Academy

General characteristics
- Class & type: Gearing-class destroyer
- Displacement: 3,460 tons
- Length: 390.6 ft (119.1 m)
- Beam: 40.1 ft (12.2 m)
- Draft: 14.4 ft (4.4 m)
- Propulsion: 60,000 shp (45,000 kW); General Electric geared turbines, 2 screws
- Speed: 36.8 kn (68.2 km/h; 42.3 mph)
- Armament: 3 x twin 5 in (130 mm)/38 DP guns; 12 x 40 mm AA guns; 11 x 20 mm AA guns; 2 x quintuple 21 inch (533 mm) torpedo tubes

USS Hawkins (DD-873) was a Gearing-class destroyer in the United States Navy during World War II. Following the war, the ship saw service in the Korean War and in the 1970s, was transferred to the Republic of China Navy as Tze Yang. She remained in service until the 1990s. The ship was then scrapped with the exception of her superstructure, which became part of a display and training ground at the Zuoying Naval Academy.

== Construction and career ==
Hawkins, originally to be named Beatty, but renamed on 22 June 1944 and launched by Consolidated Steel Corporation, Orange, Texas, 7 October 1944; sponsored by Mrs. Clara Jane Hawkins, mother of namesake First Lieutenant William Deane Hawkins (killed on Tarawa). The destroyer was commissioned on 10 February 1945.

=== Service in the United States Navy ===
Following shakedown training in the Caribbean, Hawkins arrived at Norfolk on 23 March 1945 to undergo conversion to a radar picket ship. Emerging 26 May, she conducted training exercises before sailing 18 June from Guantanamo Bay, Cuba, for San Diego and Pearl Harbor. After her arrival 8 July Hawkins prepared to enter the last phase of the Pacific War, but 3 days after her 12 August departure from Pearl Harbor for Eniwetok the Japanese surrendered. The destroyer continued from Eniwetok to Iwo Jima and Tokyo Bay, arriving 27 August, and assisted in early occupation operations. She then escorted ships to and from the Marianas, remaining in Japanese waters until 3 January 1946. Hawkins then steamed to the Philippines and Saipan, finally arriving Pearl Harbor 3 April.

Arriving at San Diego on 11 April, the destroyer took part in training operations off the West Coast until sailing again for the Far East January 1947. During the months that followed she steamed between Chinese and Korean ports, assisting and supporting American Marine units in their attempts to stabilize the Chinese situation and protect American lives. Hawkins under the command of Cmdr. Alfred L. Cope, played a significant role in rescue operations off Chilang Point Hong Kong 19 July 1947, when the steamer SS Hong Kheng sank with over 2,000 passengers on board. She returned to the United States 8 October 1947.

After a year of operations out of San Diego the ship sailed again for the Far East, arriving at Tsingtao, China on 29 October. Following operations off the Chinese coast Hawkins got underway from Tsingtao on 6 December. On this long voyage, completing a circuit of the globe, the destroyer visited Ceylon, Turkey, Gibraltar, New York City, and Panama before arriving San Diego 10 March 1949.

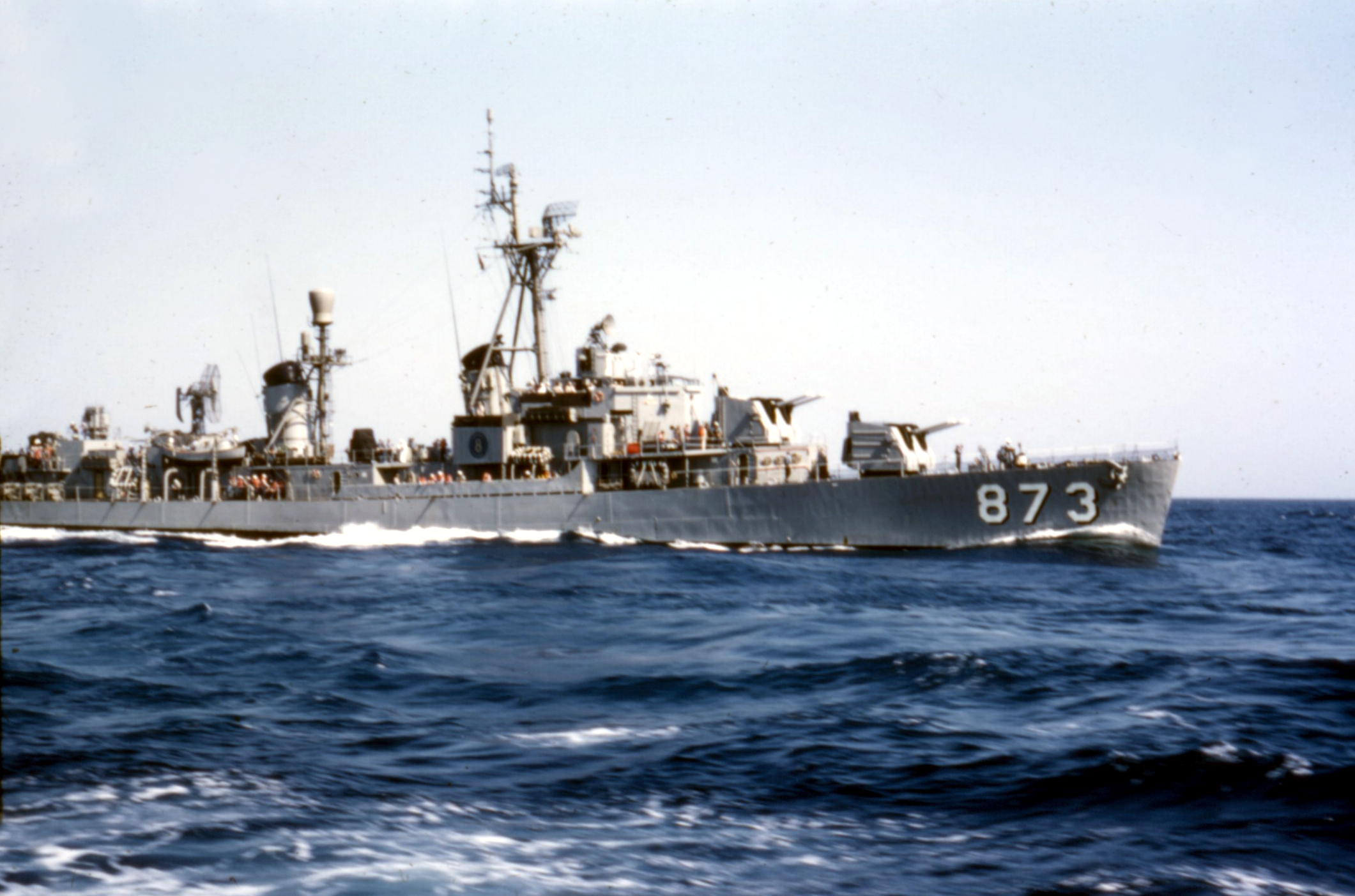
Hawkins in the Mediterranean in 1957

Hawkins was reassigned to the U.S. Atlantic Fleet soon afterward, arriving at her new home port, Newport, Rhode Island on 23 May 1949. For the next year she took part in Reserve training cruises and readiness exercises in the Caribbean. The ship had been reclassified DDR-873 on 18 March 1949. Hawkins departed on 2 May 1950 for a cruise with 6th Fleet in the Mediterranean.

==== Korean War ====
While in the Mediterranean, the world became aware of the Communist invasion of South Korea. After NATO maneuvers, Hawkins returned to Newport 10 October and prepared to become part of the fleet sailing for what became known as the Korean War. Sailing on 3 January via the Panama Canal she arrived at Pusan on 5 February. During her four months of Korean duty, Hawkins screened the mobile aircraft carrier forces during strikes on enemy positions and supply lines, provided antisubmarine protection, and controlled jet aircraft in combat air patrols. She also acted as plane guard during operations in the Formosa Straits designed to discourage Communist aggression against the friendly island. Departing the Far East in June, the destroyer returned to Newport on 8 August via the Mediterranean.

==== Suez Crisis ====
For the next few years the veteran ship alternated picket duty and training operations in the western Atlantic with periodic cruises to the Mediterranean with the 6th Fleet. She was in the Eastern Mediterranean during the summer of 1950 when the Suez Crisis threatened the security and peace of the area. Hawkins arrived at Mayport, Florida, her new homeport, on 18 August 1960. She became part of DESRON-8 performing exercises in the Bahamas and Caribbean areas with one deployment of radar picket duty off the coast of Nicaragua returning to Mayport in December 1960. In January 1961 the destroyer soon resumed her pattern of cruises to the Mediterranean.

==== Cuban Missile Crisis ====
In 1961 she operated with a special Task Group in connection with American space experiments and missile tests off Cape Canaveral, Florida. When the introduction of offensive missiles into Cuba in 1962 threatened the security of the United States, Hawkins joined with other ships in quarantining that Caribbean country, cruising the Caribbean from late October until December. In 1963 the ship returned to the Mediterranean in January returning to Mayport in July and in August took part in Polaris missile tests in the Caribbean with the submarine USS Alexander Hamilton. During the next 5 months, Hawkins operated with aircraft carriers off Florida and in the Caribbean. Following additional Polaris missile tests with USS Andrew Jackson in February 1964, the destroyer steamed to Boston 21 March and was placed in commission, in reserve, prior to undergoing a FRAM I overhaul.

==== Vietnam War ====
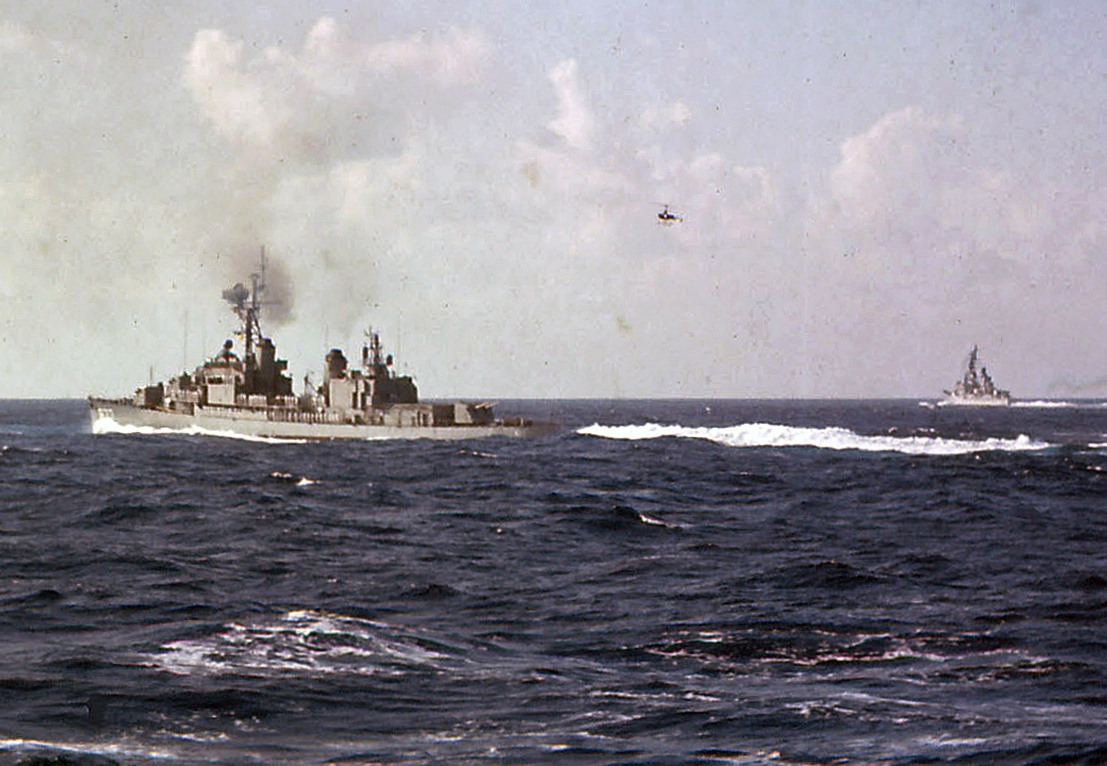
Hawkins with a deployed DASH drone, circa 1965

Reclassified DD-873 on 1 April, Hawkins completed FRAM late in 1964. Assigned to Destroyer Squadron 24, she operated out of Newport until departing 29 September for duty in the Far East. Steaming via the Panama Canal and the West Coast, she joined the 7th Fleet on 23 November. For the next three months she guarded aircraft carriers in the South China Sea and the Gulf of Tonkin and provided gunfire support for ground troops along the coast of South Vietnam. She departed Subic Bay late in February 1966, steamed via the Suez Canal, and arrived Newport 8 April.

Hawkins, over the next few months, participated in naval exercises off the East Coast and in the Caribbean. Departing Newport on 28 November, she joined the 6th Fleet at Gibraltar 8 December and became flagship for ComDesRon 24. For more than three months she cruised the Mediterranean from Spain to Greece before returning to Newport 20 March 1967. Into mid-1967 she operated along the Atlantic Coast from New England to Florida.

Hawkins went into the Boston Naval Shipyard in 1967 for overhaul. After months in the shipyard and in dry dock, the ship went to Guantanamo Bay, Cuba for a shakedown cruise.

On 11 February 1969, Hawkins was operating off the coast of Cuba with the submarine USS Chopper when Chopper had a near-fatal accident. The submarine managed to surface but Chopper shot through the surface of the ocean, nearly vertical. The entire forward section of the submarine, to the aft edge of the sail, cleared the surface before she fell back.

In July 1969, Hawkins, working out of Cape Canaveral, Florida began Polaris missile tests with the Royal Navy's submarine HMS Renown, which ended with a successful test firing of a missile down a test range. Immediately afterward, these same tests were made with the submarine USS Thomas Jefferson but in this case the test was aborted shortly after launch.

Hawkins took part in the United States space project in November 1969 when it was assigned to the Apollo 12 Atlantic Recovery Force. The ship was fitted with special capsule recovery gear and practiced along with a Navy Underwater Demolition Team (UDT) to be prepared to recover the space capsule in the Atlantic if the Pacific landing was aborted.

In December 1969, Hawkins changed homeport from Newport, Rhode Island, to Norfolk, Virginia.

In 1970, the United States Navy assigned the destroyer USS Steinaker to the NATO Standing Naval Force Atlantic for Exercise Atlantic Ice. Steinaker ran aground while doing maneuvers in a fjord near Harstad, traveling at 25 knots (46 km/h; 29 mph) and was removed from the exercise. Hawkins was directed to replace Steinaker and complete their assignment with NATO. Hawkins met Steinaker in Bergen, Norway to offload their munitions, allowing them to enter the repair facility at Haakonsvern. From Bergen, Hawkins traveled to Oslo with exercises above the Arctic Circle en route. After more exercise in the North Sea, the force stopped in Kiel and then proceeded to Copenhagen in mid-May. There was a show of flags in Antwerp and Plymouth. Leaving Plymouth at the end of May, the force exercised with a French submarine in the Bay of Biscay before going to Lisbon.

==== Apollo 14 ====
On 9 February 1971, Hawkins again participated in the space program as a backup recovery ship in the Atlantic for Apollo 14.

In the spring of 1977, the USS Hawkins DD-873 was deployed to the US Sixth Fleet, where she served both with a CVBG and independently until October when she returned to Norfolk and began the transition to the Naval Reserve Fleet.

From 1977 to 1979, the Hawkins was assigned as a Naval Reserve training ship in Philadelphia. By that time she was nearing the end of her designed lifespan. Science fiction writer James D. Macdonald, then an ensign in the United States Naval Reserve, was assigned to her during this period, and reported to the captain one morning that the sounding tape used to check the water level in the ship's tanks had punched through the striking plate in one of the sounding tubes and the hull plate beyond it, indicating the hull was becoming unsound.

The ship was stricken from the Navy List on 1 October 1979 and sold to the Taiwan in 1983.

=== Service in the Republic of China Navy ===
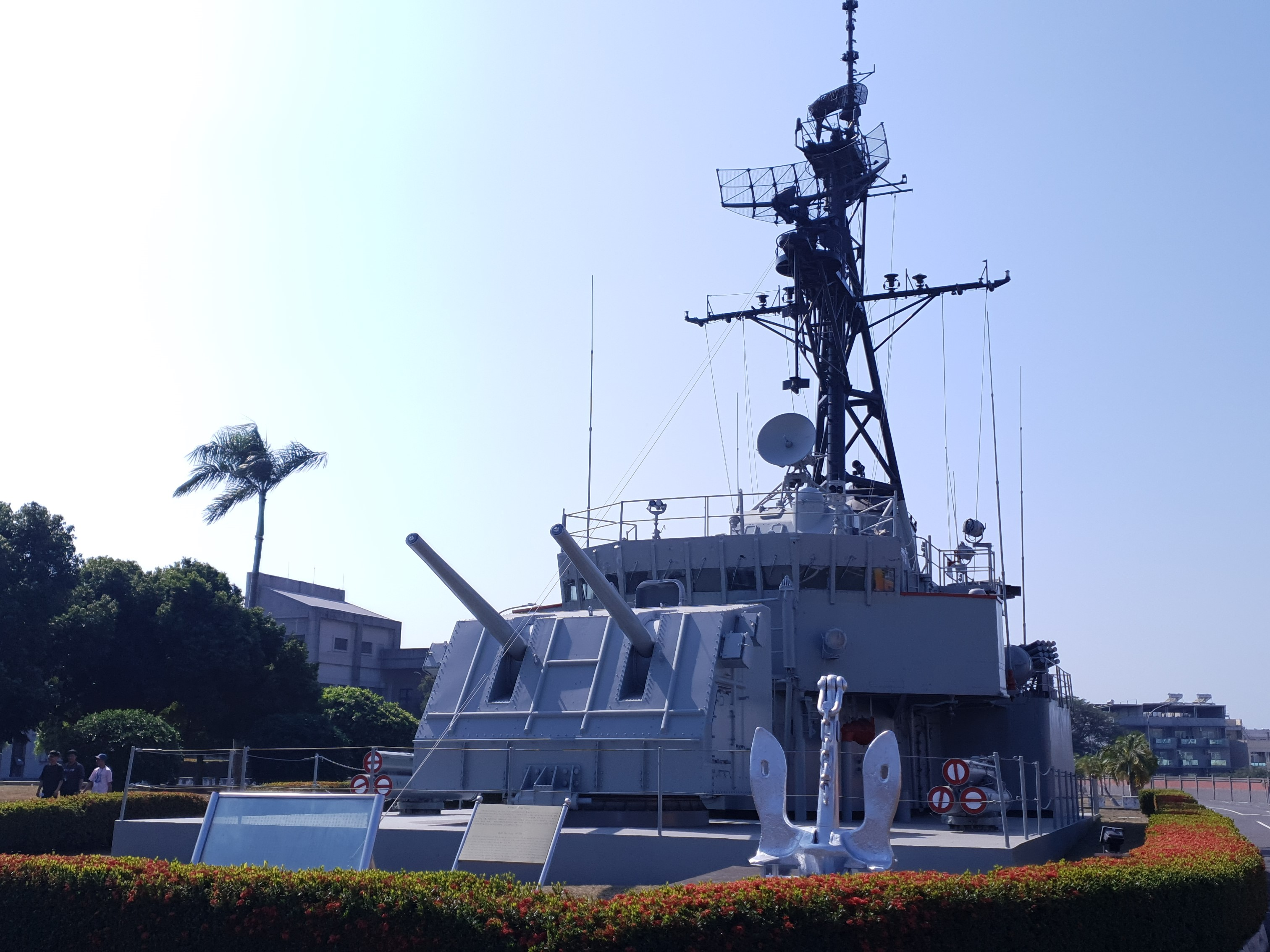
ROCS Tze Yang (part of her superstructure)

The ship was commissioned on 9 July 1983 and renamed Shao Yang or Tze Yang (DD-930) after repairs were completed.

During Exercise Han Kuang in 1989, she successfully launched the RUR-5 ASROC and torpedoes.

The ship was scrapped in the late 1990s, but part of her superstructure is on display and training ground in the Zuoying Naval Academy, Kaohsiung City. Another one of her 5-inch gun is on static display at the Kaohsiung Harbor, YM Museum of Marine Exploration Kaohsiung.

== Awards ==
Hawkins received two battle stars for Korean War service.
