= Jade Mountain (Alaska) =

Mountain in Alaska, United States

- Location within Alaska

Highest point
- Elevation: 3,028 ft (923 m)
- Coordinates: 68.6185°N 149.6756°W

Geography
- Country: United States
- State: Alaska
- Borough: North Slope Borough

Jade Mountain is a mountain in the North Slope Borough, Alaska located two miles (3.2 km) southwest of Toolik Lake on Alaska State land. The name refers to the color of the moss-covered tundra around the summit.

It is a popular hike for researchers at the Toolik Lake Field Station.
