= Toolik Lake =

Lake in northern Alaska, US

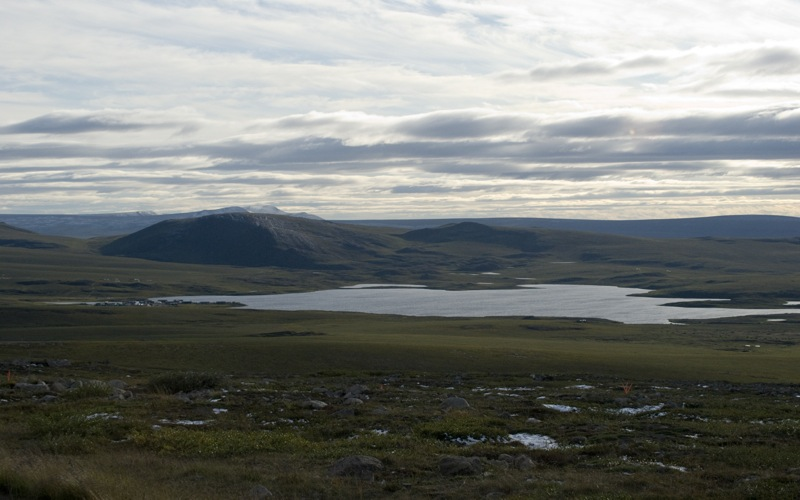
- Toolik Lake as photographed in 2016. Toolik Field Station is seen on the left.

- Location within Alaska
- Coordinates: 68.630692°N 149.610636°W
- Type: Lake
- Basin countries: United States
- Managing agency: Bureau of Land Management
- Surface area: 358 acres (1.45 km^{2})
- Max. depth: 77 ft (23 m)
- Surface elevation: 745 m (2,444 ft)

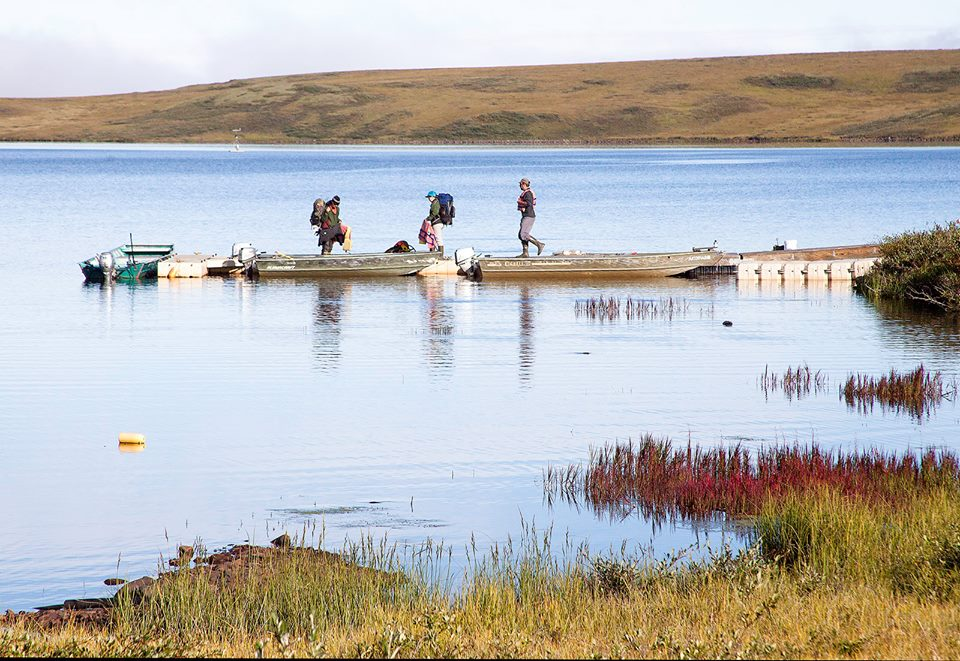
Aquatic researchers at Toolik Lake

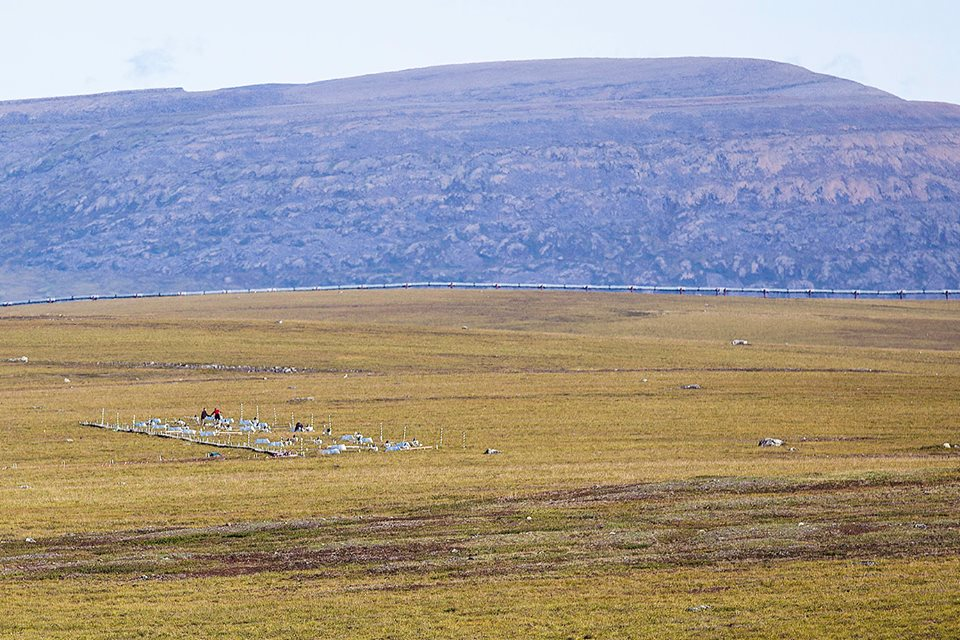
Terrestrial research in the Toolik Lake RNA. The Trans-Alaska Pipeline System is seen in the background.

Toolik Lake is an Arctic lake located within the North Slope Borough, Alaska. It is in a remote wilderness area managed by the Bureau of Land Management accessed by the Dalton Highway. It is 130 mi (210 km) south of Prudhoe Bay in the northern foothills of the Brooks Range. The name is derived from the Iñupiat word tutlik, meaning yellow-billed loon.

Limnological studies of Toolik Lake began in the summer of 1975. Research is performed by organizations such as the Global Lake Ecological Observatory Network, Institute of Arctic Biology, International Tundra Experiment, National Ecological Observatory Network, and NASA. Nearly one-third of all Arctic research takes place within 50 km of either Toolik Lake or Abisko Scientific Research Station.

== Formation and characteristics ==
Toolik Lake is a kettle lake formed by retreating glaciers during the Itkillik II age of glaciation. Large masses of ice were left in their wake, and as they melted, lake basins were formed.

Toolik Lake covers 358 acres (145 ha), and has a max depth of 77 ft (23 m). The watershed of the lake is 63.7 km^{2}. Sunlight does not penetrate deep into the lake due to a high amount of dissolved organic matter. The lake may retain surface ice until late June and may refreeze as early as mid-September. Since recordings began, the alkalinity of the lake has doubled. There has been an increase in dissolved calcium and magnesium flowing into the lake, caused by an increase in weathering of mineral soils that were previously frozen.

The lake is bordered by Jade Mountain on the southwest.

== Ecology ==
Toolik Lake is home to an active zooplankton community, primarily consisting of nanoflagellates, ciliates, rotifers, and copepods. Five species of fish exist in the lake, including Arctic grayling, burbot, lake trout, round whitefish, and slimy sculpin. Grayling, trout, and whitefish are recreationally fished.

Tussock tundra dominates the terrain surrounding the lake. Other plant communities in the area include wet sedge tundra, as well drier heath tundra found at higher elevations. Low growing shrubs are abundant, including birches and willows. Trees are not present. Since surveys began, there has been a 19 percent increase in vascular vegetation abundance in the area around Toolik Lake, and plant canopy height and extent have been increasing. Conversely, moss and lichen abundance has seen a significant decrease.

Over 80 species of birds may be observed from the lake during spring migration.

== Climate ==
Average monthly temperatures are below freezing for 9 months of the year. Only in June, July, and August do monthly average temperatures remain above freezing. Toolik experiences the midnight sun from June to August, while experiencing 24-hour darkness in December and January. The mean annual precipitation is 331 mm (13.0 in). In the area, the average depth of winter snowfall is around one foot.

Lightning strikes have become much more prevalent in northern Alaska since studies began, possibly linked with rising atmospheric temperatures. In 2007, Alaska's largest recorded tundra fire was started by a lightning strike, occurring only 20 miles from Toolik.

Toolik Lake has a tundra climate (Köppen ET).

Climate data for Toolik Lake, Alaska, 1991–2020 normals: 2461ft (750m)
Month	Jan	Feb	Mar	Apr	May	Jun	Jul	Aug	Sep	Oct	Nov	Dec	Year
Mean daily maximum °F (°C)	4.3 (−15.4)	10.8 (−11.8)	9.5 (−12.5)	22.2 (−5.4)	41.5 (5.3)	57.0 (13.9)	58.5 (14.7)	52.2 (11.2)	40.1 (4.5)	24.2 (−4.3)	9.2 (−12.7)	0.5 (−17.5)	27.5 (−2.5)
Daily mean °F (°C)	−5.5 (−20.8)	3.0 (−16.1)	0.0 (−17.8)	10.2 (−12.1)	32.5 (0.3)	47.3 (8.5)	49.7 (9.8)	43.9 (6.6)	32.9 (0.5)	16.3 (−8.7)	2.1 (−16.6)	−5.8 (−21.0)	18.9 (−7.3)
Mean daily minimum °F (°C)	−15.2 (−26.2)	−4.9 (−20.5)	−9.5 (−23.1)	−1.9 (−18.8)	23.5 (−4.7)	37.6 (3.1)	40.9 (4.9)	35.6 (2.0)	25.7 (−3.5)	8.4 (−13.1)	−5.0 (−20.6)	−12.0 (−24.4)	10.3 (−12.1)
Source: NOAA

== Toolik Lake Research Natural Area ==
The Toolik Lake Research Natural Area is the 82,800-acre area managed by the Bureau of Land Management surrounding Toolik Lake. In 1991, it was designated as an Area of Critical Environmental Concern. Two rare plants are known to occur in the area; Claytoniella bostockii, and Erigeron muirii. In 2002, the Bureau of Land Management and the University of Alaska Museum Herbarium agreed to search at least 3,000 acres/year around the Toolik Lake Research Natural Area and the Galbraith Lake Outstanding Natural Area for rare plants.

Camping is prohibited within the area.

== Toolik Field Station ==
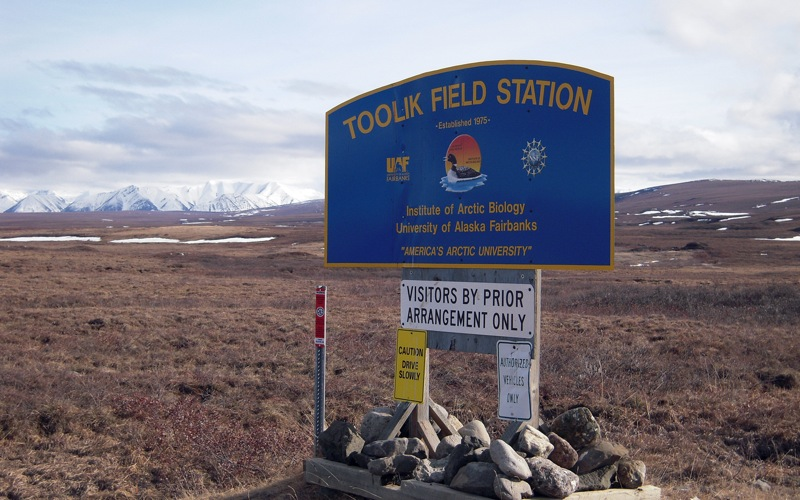
Toolik Field Station sign

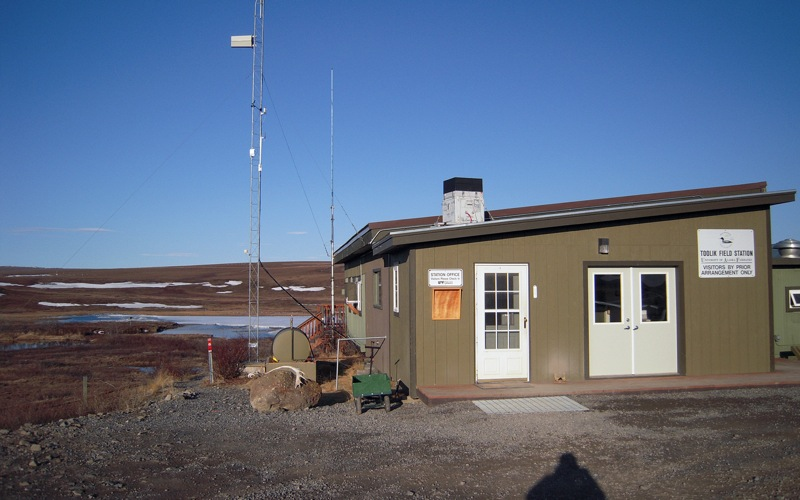
Office at Toolik Field Station, 2008

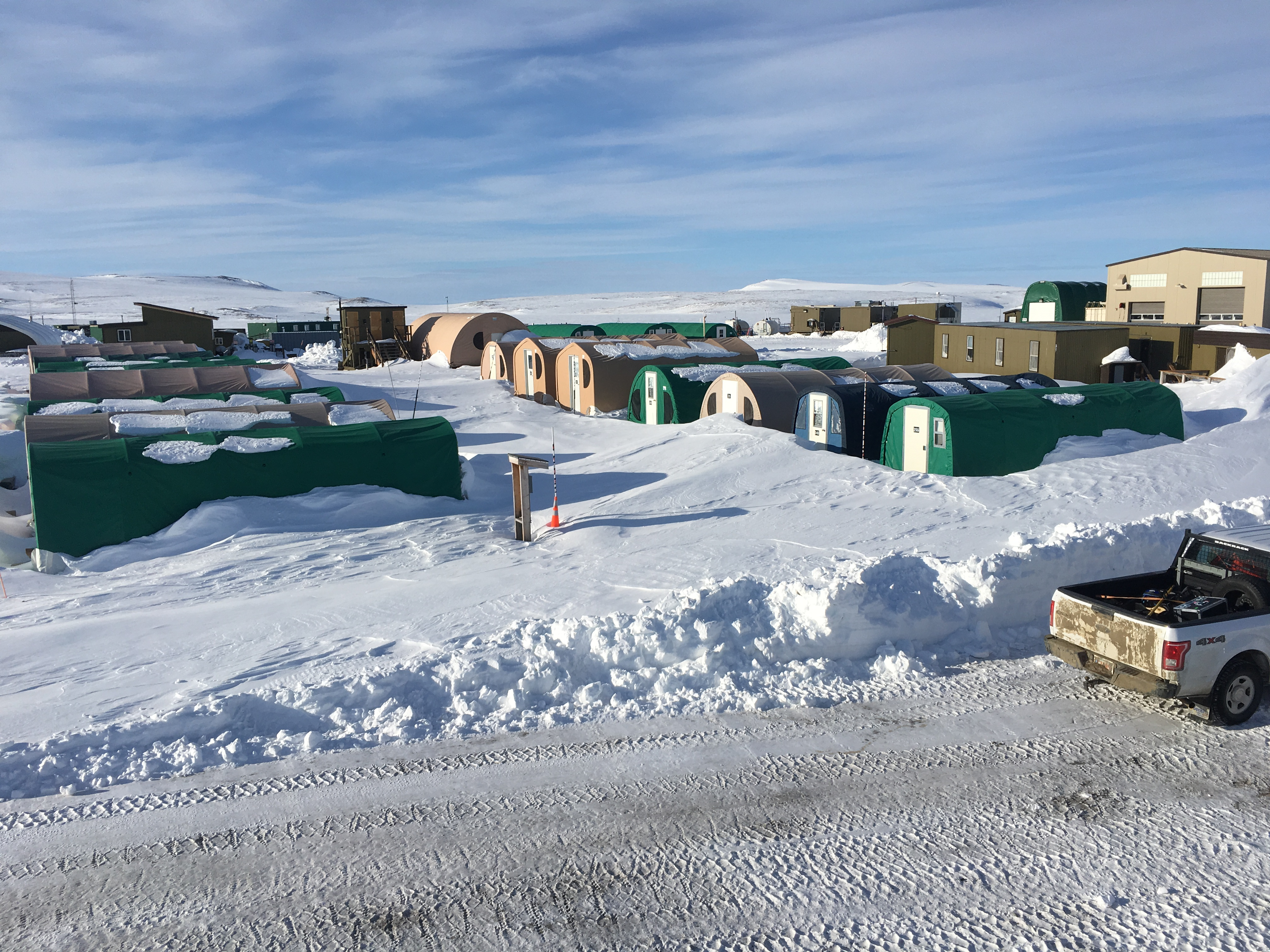
Toolik Field Station, March 2018

The Toolik Field Station is an arctic research station located on the southeast shore of Toolik Lake. It is managed by the Institute of Arctic Biology at the University of Alaska Fairbanks (UAF). The station is located on 33.87 acres of land, and can support a population of up to 175 researchers. The National Science Foundation provides the station with $3 million a year to support operations.

The station is supported by modern amenities, including generator produced electricity, running water and shower facilities, a sauna, a kitchen and dining facility, dormitory-style housing, heated garages, and full-service wet and dry chemistry labs.

=== History ===
In June 1975, UAF placed the first structure on the lake to facilitate aquatic research. It was originally called the "University Toolik Camp". The initial research focused on the trophic levels, biogeochemistry, and nutrient cycling of the lake. By 1979, both aquatic and terrestrial ecologists were studying the site. The scope of research broadened to include the growth rates and nutrient limitation of tundra vegetation. The facility quickly grew too large for its location, and in 1983, it was moved and given its current name. In 1987, Toolik was designated a Long-Term Ecological Research site.

In the late 1980s, Toolik was studied as part of the Response, Resistance, Resilience, and Recovery from Disturbance (R4D) project supported by the United States Department of Energy and National Academy of Sciences. The goal of the project was to understand the effects of disturbance on tundra ecosystems.

Through grants from the Department of Energy, Alaska State Legislature, and the National Science Foundation, the station has been upgraded considerably since its inception.
