= USS Spadefish (SSN-668) =

Submarine of the United States

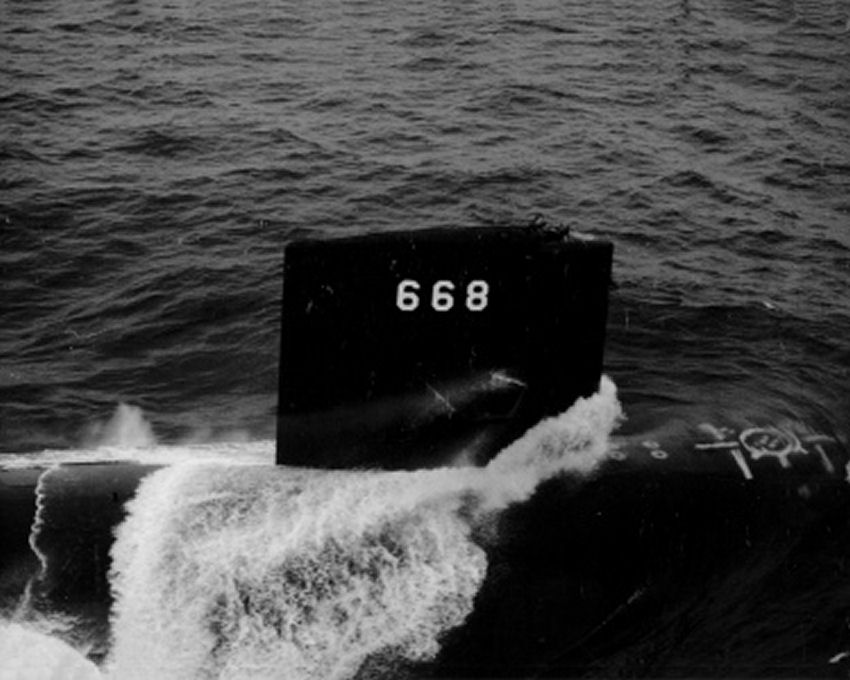
- USS Spadefish (SSN-668) on her sea trials off Virginia in 1969.

History

United States
- Name: USS Spadefish
- Namesake: The spadefish
- Ordered: 9 March 1965
- Builder: Newport News Shipbuilding and Dry Dock Company, Newport News, Virginia
- Laid down: 21 December 1966
- Launched: 15 May 1968
- Sponsored by: Mrs. Charles T. Booth
- Commissioned: 14 August 1969
- Decommissioned: 11 April 1997
- Stricken: 11 April 1997
- Home port: Naval Station Norfolk, Norfolk, Virginia
- Motto: UBI ACTIO EST (Where The Action Is)
- Fate: Scrapping via Ship and Submarine Recycling Program begun 1 October 1996, completed 24 October 1997
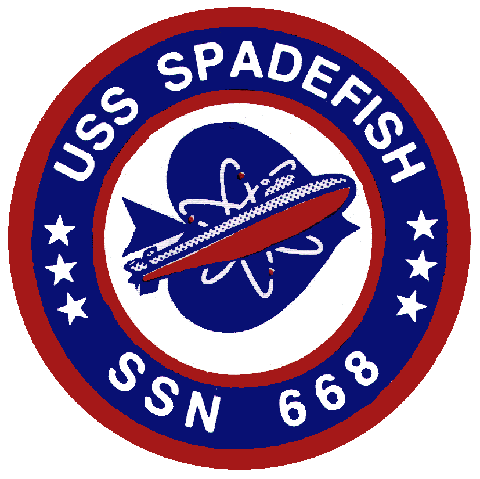
- Badge

General characteristics
- Class & type: Sturgeon-class attack submarine
- Displacement: 3,995 long tons (4,059 t) light; 4,291 long tons (4,360 t) full; 296 long tons (301 t) dead
- Length: 292 ft 3 in (89.08 m)
- Beam: 31 ft 8 in (9.65 m)
- Draft: 28 ft 8 in (8.74 m)
- Installed power: 15,000 shaft horsepower (11.2 megawatts)
- Propulsion: One S5W nuclear reactor, two steam turbines, one screwctor
- Speed: 15 knots (28 km/h; 17 mph) surfaced; 25 knots (46 km/h; 29 mph) submerged
- Test depth: 1,300 feet (400 meters)
- Complement: 109 (14 officers, 95 enlisted men)
- Armament: 4 × 21-inch (533 mm) torpedo tubes; Mark 48 torpedoes; UUM-44A SUBROC missiles; UGM-84A/C Harpoon missiles; Tomahawk cruise missiles; Tube-launched mobile mines

USS Spadefish (SSN-668), a Sturgeon-class submarine, was the second ship of the United States Navy to be named for the spadefish, a spiny-finned fish found in coastal waters of the western Atlantic from Cuba to Cape Cod.

== Construction and commissioning ==
The contract to build Spadefish was awarded to Newport News Shipbuilding and Dry Dock Company in Newport News, Virginia, on 9 March 1965 and her keel was laid down there on 21 December 1966. She was launched on 15 May 1968, sponsored by Mrs. Charles T. Booth, and commissioned on 14 August 1969.

== Service history ==
=== 1969-1984 ===
Spadefish was assigned Norfolk, Virginia, as her home port, and it remained her home port throughout her career. She was attached to Submarine Squadron 6.

Following shakedown in the Atlantic Ocean, Spadefish underwent post-shakedown repairs and alterations at Newport News from April to June 1970 and in July 1970 participated in antisubmarine warfare exercises in the North Atlantic Ocean. After returning to her home port, Norfolk, Virginia, she deployed in the Atlantic from October to December 1970 and then returned to Norfolk for upkeep.

On 18 February 1971, Spadefish got underway for her second deployment in the Atlantic, visiting Faslane, Scotland, before returning to Norfolk on 18 April 1971. She operated in the Norfolk area for the remainder of 1971, participating in antisubmarine warfare exercises and attack submarine training.

In 1972, Spadefish participated in training operations in the Norfolk area until deploying in the Atlantic from June to August, visiting Holy Loch, Scotland, before returning to Norfolk. She again deployed in the Atlantic on 10 October 1972 and returned to Norfolk on 17 December 1972.

Through June 1973, Spadefish operated out of Norfolk along the United States East Coast. She conducted independent exercises, a fleet ballistic missile submarine security exercise, and independent attack submarine training. In May and June 1973, she supported Cruiser-Destroyer Flotilla 8 in an Atlantic readiness exercise and a sea control exercise. At the end of June 1973, she spent a week at the Isle of Portland in England, and, in July 1973, returned to the U.S. East Coast. At the beginning of September 1973, she commenced a major overhaul at Norfolk Naval Shipyard in Portsmouth, Virginia.

Spadefish completed overhaul in July 1974 and resumed operations along the U.S. East Coast.

Spadefish operated in the Arctic on an Ice Exercise (ICEX) in 1984 under the command of Commander George Bardsley.

Spadefish operated in the Arctic on an ICEX in 1992 under the command of Commander R. B. Williams.

Spadefish again operated in the Arctic on an ICEX in 1993, still under the command of Commander Williams.

Spadefish completed two deployments to the Persian Gulf in 1995 and 1996, crossing the equator on both occasions. The 1996 deployment began at Pier 21 in Norfolk and ended at Puget Sound Naval Shipyard in Bremerton, Washington.

== Decommissioning and disposal ==
Spadefish remained at Bremerton after her 1996 arrival, and was decommissioned there on 11 April 1997 under the command of Commander C. W. "Buddy" Puryear. She was stricken from the Naval Vessel Register the same day. Her scrapping via the Nuclear-Powered Ship and Submarine Recycling Program at Puget Sound Naval Shipyard began on 1 October 1996 and was completed on 24 October 1997.
