= Quaternary Environment of the Eurasian North =

Arctic research program

Quaternary Environment of the Eurasian North, abbreviated QUEEN was an international and interdisciplinary research programme in the Arctic.

QUEEN was established to understand the processes involved in environmental changes in the Arctic region by studying past environmental changes during the Late Cenozoic era. A primary objective of QUEEN was to make the environmental record and the history of glaciation during the last 250,000 years as complete for Eurasia as elsewhere. Regions of particular importance for understanding the Arctic's role in global climate change are the Eurasian shelves and the land masses south of these, including Siberian permafrost. The ice sheets in these regions are key elements in paleoclimatic models and play a vital role in the reconstruction of a continuous paleoenvironmental record. Special effort was devoted to the correlation of records from different sources across the Arctic. The programme was running between 1996 and 2003 under the umbrella of the European Science Foundation (ESF) and was coordinated by Prof. Dr. Jörn Thiede.

== Objectives ==
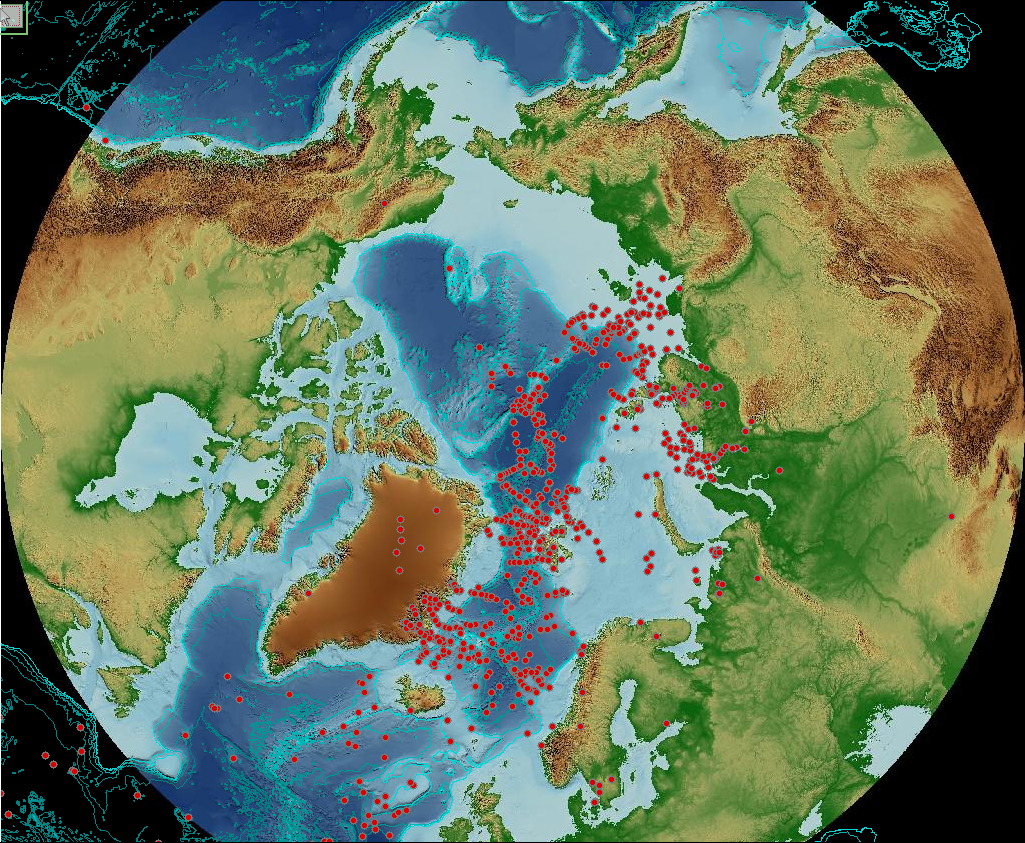
Sites on land and in the Arctic Ocean were sampled during the QUEEN project

- Investigation of environmental changes in the Eurasian Arctic over the past 250,000 years, i.e., the last two climatic cycles.
- Establish a record of palaeoenvironmental changes during this period on land,

on continental shelves, and in the deep sea of the Arctic Ocean along the Eurasian continental margin.

- Correlate terrestrial, shelf and deep ocean records by using a variety of stratigraphic

tools and dating methods.

- Reconstruct ice-sheet growth and decay over this period from geological and

palaeontological evidence.

- Predict how sensitively ice sheets respond to climate change

through the glacial-interglacial cycles by numerical modeling.

- Study relative changes in sea level to build a map of corresponding

vertical movements of the underlying earth surface.

- Investigate how the depth of permafrost has responded to climatic and environmental

change.

- Use high resolution radiocarbon-dating for the environmental record of

the last glacial maximum and deglaciation (<30,000 yr BP).

== Institutes involved ==
- Alfred Wegener Institute for Polar and Marine Research (AWI), Bremerhaven
- Arctic and Antarctic Research Institute (AARI), St. Petersburg
- Department of Quaternary Geology, University of Lund
- Geological Museum, University of Copenhagen
- Geological Survey of Finland
- Geologisk Institutt, Universitet i Bergen
- Research Center for Marine Geosciences (GEOMAR), Kiel (renamed to Leibniz Institute of Marine Sciences) (IFM-GEOMAR)
- Institute of Earth Studies, University of Wales
