= David Balton =

American policy advisor

Executive Director, Arctic Executive Steering Committee
- In office September 2021 – January 2025
- President: Joe Biden

Senior Fellow, Harvard Kennedy School
- In office May 2025 – present

Personal details
- Spouse: Jane Stewart
- Children: 2
- Education: Harvard College (A.B., cum laude); Georgetown University (J.D., magna cum laude)
- Occupation: Lawyer, diplomat, policy advisor
- Known for: Arctic policy, ocean governance, U.S. Department of State diplomacy

David Balton is a Senior Fellow at the Harvard Kennedy School of Government, where he works with the Arctic Initiative, part of the Belfer Center for Science and International Affairs. He is also an adviser to the Ocean Conservancy. From September 2021 to January 2025, Balton served in the White House Office of Science and Technology Policy as the executive director of the Arctic Executive Steering Committee. He previously served for 32 years as a lawyer and diplomat in the U.S. Department of State, focusing primarily on issues pertaining to the ocean and the Polar Regions. He attained the rank of Ambassador in 2005, following Senate confirmation.

== Education ==
Balton received his A.B. from Harvard College, graduating cum laude. He earned his J.D. from Georgetown University, graduating magna cum laude. He regularly lectures at the Rhodes Academy of Oceans Law and Policy and Georgetown Law School, and occasionally lectures at many other institutions, including Dartmouth College. From 2018 to 2021, Balton was a Senior Fellow at the Woodrow Wilson International Center for Scholars, publishing policy papers and engaging in public events relating to the Arctic region. He co-authored a report on the need for an Arctic Council Strategic Plan.

== U.S. Department of State (1985–2018) ==
From 1985 - 1997, Balton served in the U.S. Department of State as an attorney-advisor. His portfolio in this role included international claims, human rights, and the law of the sea. He then served as the Director of the Office of Marine Conservation, where he coordinated U.S. foreign policy relating to international fisheries. He also oversaw the participation of the United States in international organizations focused on management of living marine resources.

In 2002, Balton was promoted to Deputy Assistant Secretary for Oceans and Fisheries, a portfolio that also included responsibility for overseeing U.S. foreign policy concerning the Arctic and Antarctica. Over the next 15 years, Balton frequently served as the lead U.S. negotiator on fisheries and ocean agreements. He also chaired or co-chaired many international negotiations, including the negotiations that produced the 2011 Arctic Search and Rescue Agreement, the 2013 Arctic Marine Oil Pollution Agreement, the 2015 Oslo Declaration, and the 2018 Agreement to Prevent Unregulated High Seas Fisheries in the Central Arctic Ocean.

During the U.S. Chairmanship of the Arctic Council (2015–2017), Balton served as Chair of the Senior Arctic Officials, overseeing the day-to-day work of the Arctic Council. He led negotiations on the Fairbanks Declaration and oversaw numerous initiatives to address Arctic issues.

From 2013 to 2017, Balton chaired the U.S. Extended Continental Shelf Task Force, supervising the effort to establish the outer limits of the U.S. continental shelf.

Balton's other notable accomplishments while working at the Department of State include:

Our Ocean Conferences (2014–2016): He served as a key member of Department of State team that planned and organized conferences that produced unprecedented commitments on ocean protection.

U.S.-Cuba Joint Statement on Environmental Cooperation (2015): He negotiated and signed a Joint Statement on behalf of the United States.

U.S.-Russia Agreement to Prevent Illegal, Unreported and Unregulated Fishing (2015): He led the U.S. delegation in negotiating this Agreement and signed the Agreement on behalf of the United States.

North Pacific Fisheries Convention: He chaired international negotiations to establish a regional fisheries management organization for the North Pacific and testified before the U.S. Senate in support of a successful U.S. ratification effort.

UN Fish Stocks Agreement: He served as President of the United Nations Review Conference for this Agreement in 2006 and 2010.

Ross Sea Marine Protected Area (2016): He oversaw the U.S. effort to develop and negotiate the world's largest marine protected area. Arctic Today profiled Balton as his long tenure at the Department of State was drawing to a close.

== Arctic Executive Steering Committee (2021–2025) ==
In 2021, Balton was appointed as the executive director of the Arctic Executive Steering Committee (AESC) in the White House Office of Science and Technology Policy. In this role, Balton was responsible for managing the work of the steering committee, which was tasked with coordinating all Executive Branch activities and policies in and for the Arctic region. Among other achievements, the AESC led the development of the Implementation Plan for the 2022 U.S. National Strategy for the Arctic Region and then oversaw application of the plan. The AESC also oversaw and facilitated the work of federal departments in relation to the Northern Bering Sea Climate Resilience Area, which culminated in the signing of the 2024 Joint Vision Statement for the Northern Bering Sea Climate Resilience Area.

== Harvard Kennedy School (from 2025) ==
Balton is currently a Senior Fellow at the Harvard Kennedy School, where he works with the Arctic Initiative. His work focuses on the Arctic Council and sustainable ocean management. The initiative is designed to strengthen regional governance in the Arctic and to understand changes in the geopolitical climate in the region. Balton is also an adviser to the Ocean Conservancy.

== Personal life ==
Balton is married to Jane Stewart, a violinist with the National Symphony Orchestra, and has two children. Along with his wife, he creates acrostics for The New York Times. He also performed as a soloist with the National Symphony Orchestra (juggling oranges).
