= Cooperative Institute for Arctic Research =

Arctic research center in Alaska, United States

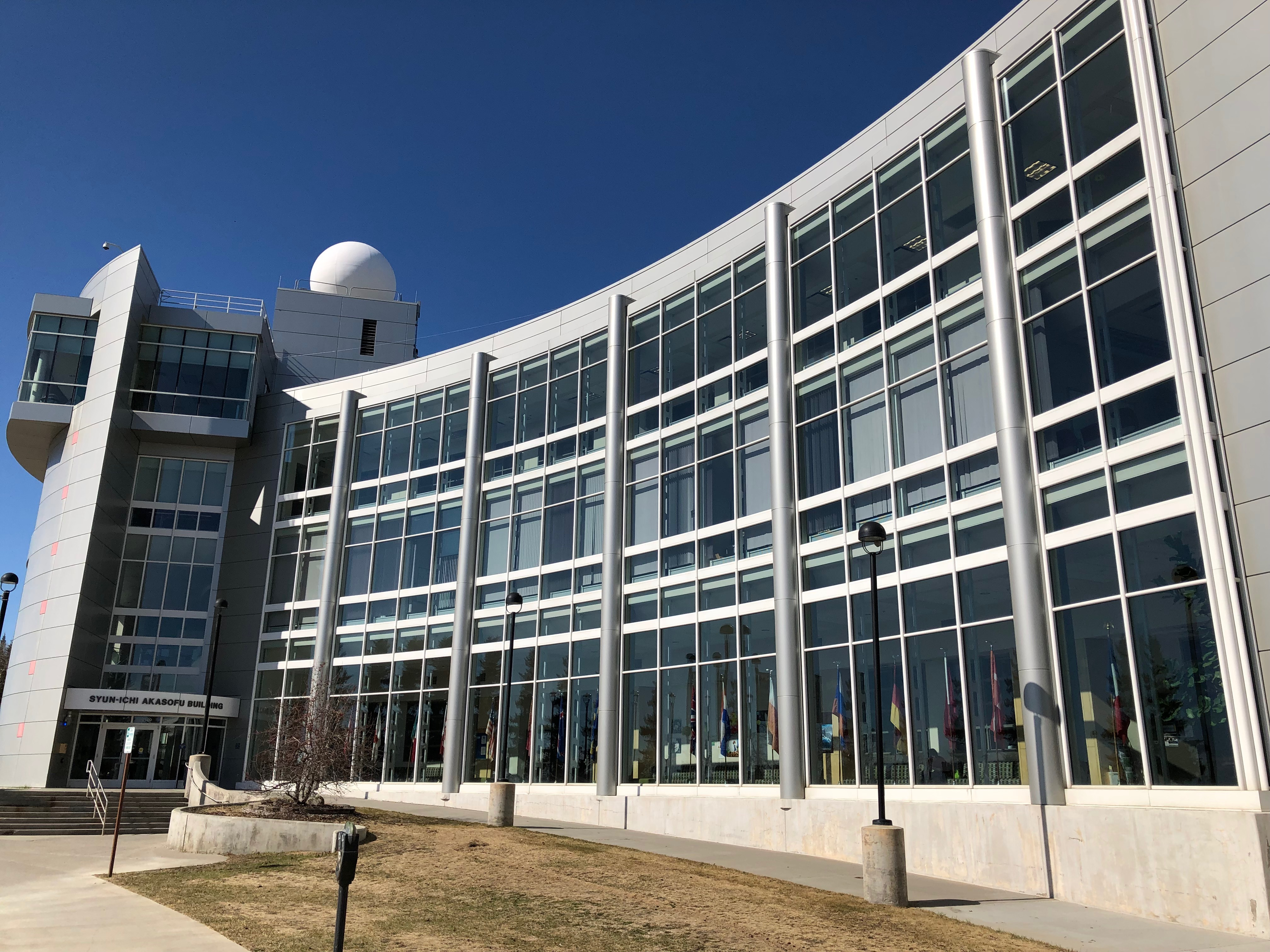
- Cooperative Institute for Arctic Research in the Akasofu Building, Fairbanks
- Abbreviation: CIFAR
- Dissolved: 2018
- Purpose: Arctic research, Bering Sea region
- Headquarters: Fairbanks, Alaska, US
- Coordinates: 64.859165°N 147.848807°W
- Parent organization: University of Alaska / NOAA
- Website: www.cifar.uaf.edu

The Cooperative Institute for Arctic Research (CIFAR no relation to the Canadian Institute for Advanced Research) was a research institute created via collaboration between the National Oceanic and Atmospheric Administration (NOAA) and The Office of Oceanic and Atmospheric Research (OAR) and the Arctic research community through the University of Alaska for research related to the Western Arctic, specifically the Bering Sea region. The institute dissolved in 2018 due to a discontinuation in funding.

CIFAR was established through a Memorandum of Understanding between NOAA and the University of Alaska. CIFAR was exclusively concerned with Arctic research. It worked closely with NOAA's Arctic Research Office and the Pacific Marine Environmental Laboratory (PMEL). Partnerships with NOAA also included the National Marine Fisheries Service (NMFS), the National Ocean Service (NOS), and an emerging relationship with the National Weather Service.

== Research ==
=== Key research areas ===
- Ecosystem Forecasting and Studies
- Coastal Hazards
- Climate Change and Variability

A key funded research study awarded to the institute was The Russian-American Long-term Census of the Arctic (RUSALCA). It was a US-Russian joint research program in the Bering and Chukchi Seas which focused on sampling and instrument deployment in US and Russian waters. The long term goals of the project were to understand the causes and effects of the reduction in sea ice in the aforementioned areas of the Arctic Ocean, partially to understand climate change better.
