= Ice Exercise =

US Navy mission in the Arctic Ocean

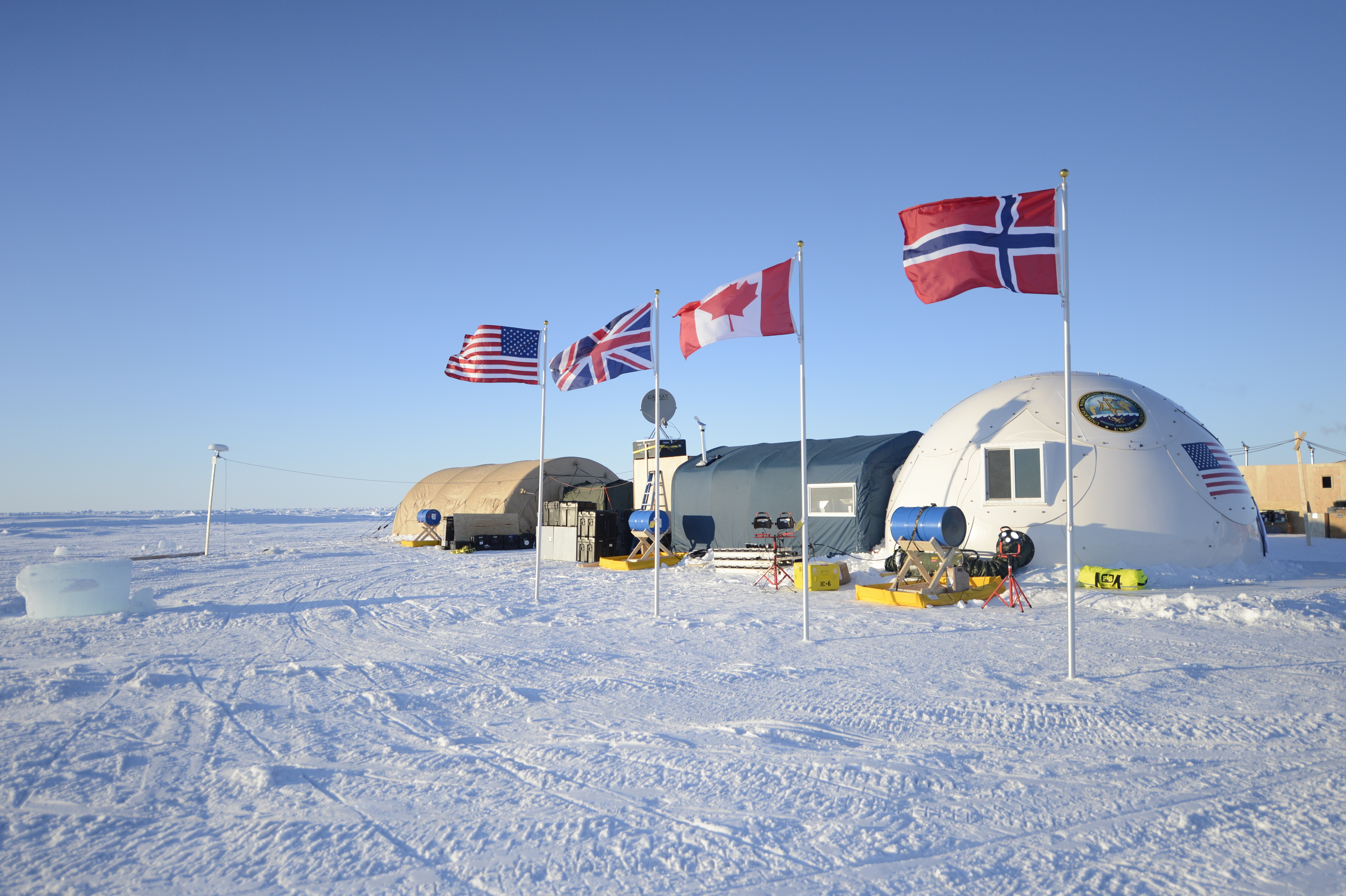
Ice Camp Sargo

Ice Exercise (ICEX) is a biennial United States Navy mission in the Arctic Ocean that establishes a temporary camp on floating sea ice. The United States' first ICEX exercise in which a submarine surfaced and broke the ice was in 1958. Since then, the US has conducted more than 26 Arctic exercises.

== History ==
=== 2009 ===
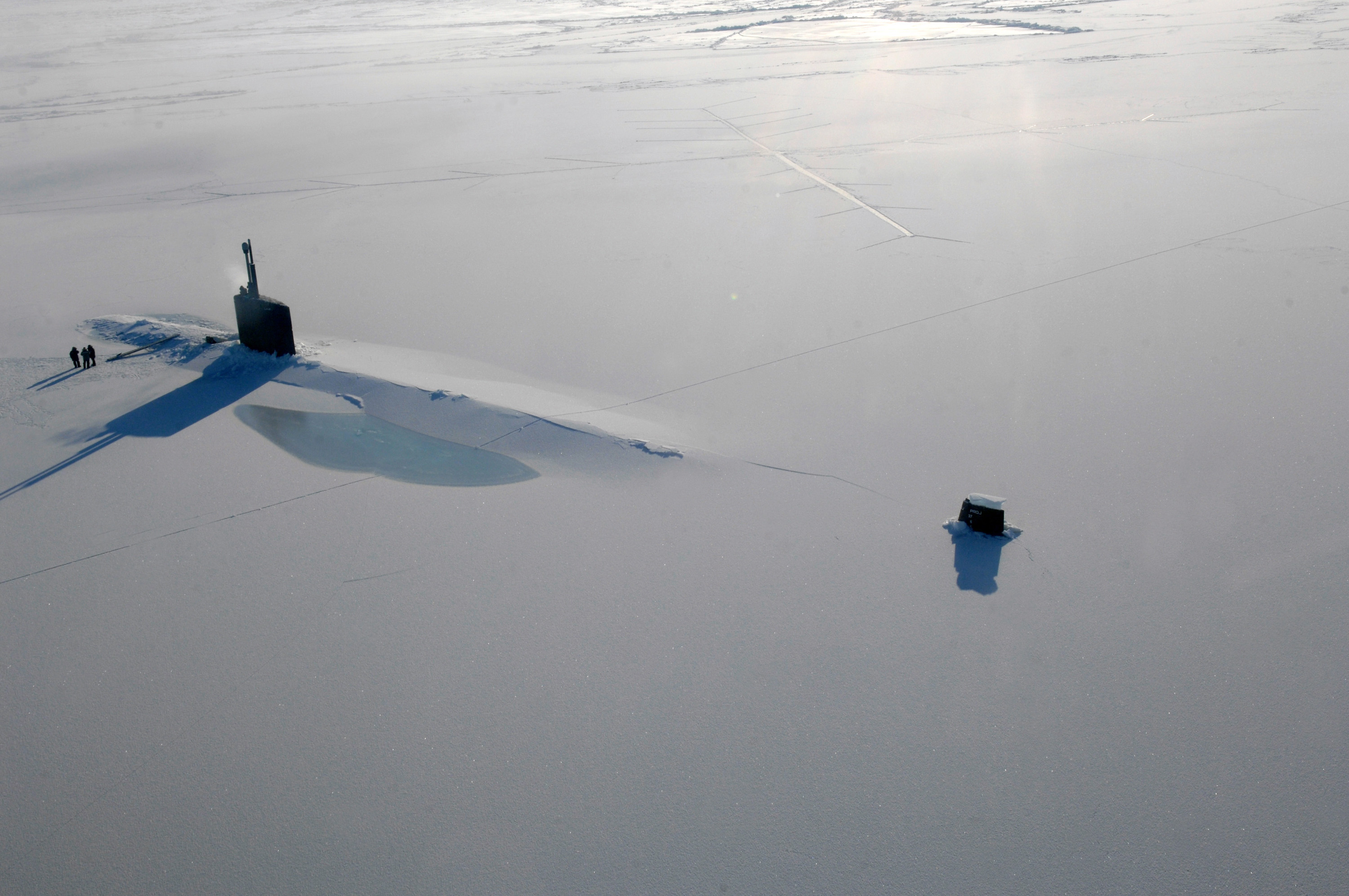
USS Annapolis (SSN-760) rests in the Arctic Ocean after surfacing through three feet of ice during ICEX 2009

Ice Exercise 2009 was a two-week US naval military exercise that took place in March 2009. Its aim was to test submarine operability and war-fighting capability in Arctic conditions.

Two US Atlantic Fleet Los Angeles-class attack submarines, USS Helena and USS Annapolis, took part in the exercise.

The Russian Pacific Ocean Fleet said it would closely monitor the exercise.

Michael Byers of The Globe and Mail speculated that the USS Annapolis might travel to Alaska using a 2,000-kilometre shortcut through the Northwest Passage, which Canada claims as "internal waters". According to maritime law, in Canadian internal waters, Washington must obtain Ottawa's permission for any voyage, whether on the surface or submerged. According to Byers, "Ottawa's failure to protest against the submarine transits could constitute evidence that – in the corridors of international diplomacy, where it really matters – Canada has already surrendered its claim."

=== 2016 ===
On 2 March 2016, the United States Navy set course bound for the Arctic region. Roughly two weeks later two Los Angeles-Class Submarines arrived at US Navy Ice Camp Sargo, which was a temporary camp stationed on top of a floating ice sheet. Their objective was to carry out the US Navy's ICEX exercise to evaluate the readiness of the Navy's submarine force and pursue further interest into scientific fields of the Arctic region. The 2016 ICEX took place over a five-week period and included over 200 participants from the four nations: the United States, Canada, United Kingdom, and Norway. The Arctic Submarine Laboratory also took part. The Arctic Submarine Laboratory was responsible for the construction of Camp SARGO, conducting tests and evaluations under Arctic operations, and acting as a liaison between the civilian science community and submarine operations.

The submarines conducted Arctic transits in which they surfaced and broke the ice (usually 60–90 cm or 2–3 feet thick), collected data, and ran other training exercise to gain experience working in this region. The importance of this exercise is that "the submarine operations to the North Pole provides the required training broaden our knowledge of an extremely challenging region that is very different than any other ocean in the world," said Cmdr. Scott Luers. Other than collecting data and training in this region the ICEX exercise also shows the US Navy's Arctic defense capabilities and readiness for roles in this region, increases the experience of sailing and working in the area, and gathering broader knowledge about this region.

== US interest in the Arctic ==
The interest of the US Navy in the Arctic Ocean is increasing because Alaska's coastline is over 1600 km/1000 miles long, and the Arctic ice cap is melting. As trade routes begin to open and accessibility to these waters is created the US Navy has a responsibility to defend the United States' Exclusive Economic Zone and secure national interests and resources. The US Exclusive Economic Zone is guaranteed by international law, which states that nations have economic rights to resources within 370 km or 200 nautical miles of the coast. As the Arctic ice cap continues to decrease in size, the availability of open water which had been unreachable has opened up and thus created and established the Artic policy.

In 2013 President Obama published the National Strategy for the Arctic Region, "defining the desired end state as an Arctic Region stable and free of conflict, where nations act responsibly in a spirit of trust and cooperation, and where economic and energy resources are developed in a sustainable manner." Also in 2013, the Secretary of Defense published the Department of Defense Arctic Strategy, which named the two objectives of establishing security and being prepared for a wide range of challenges that the region poses.

The United States established a three-part policy of near future (to 2020), mid-term (2020–2030), and far term (beyond 2030) to create realistic goals and expectations for this region and its future. Surface ships of the United States Navy do not have as much experience operating as its submarines, but with exercises such as ICEX the navy's surface ship can increase their capabilities in this region.

== Future in the Arctic ==
The future use of this region for shipping lanes or sources of natural resources depends on the availability of open water which is increasing year to year. The Arctic Ocean of the coast of Alaska is believed to have vast hydrocarbon and other natural resources. As a result of the Arctic region warming up faster than other regions of the globe, the Arctic ice cap in 2012 reached its smallest extent in history. As passageways become available, maritime activity is likely to increase along the Northern Sea Route, especially in the Chukchi Sea in northeast Alaska, and along the Bering Strait.

The shorter route offers a fuel-saving option to maritime companies. The Northern Sea Route, which goes from northeastern Asia north over Russia to Rotterdam, is 40 percent shorter than the traditional route through the Suez Canal. Other trade routes which could increase in the region are the Northwest Passage, along the northern coast of Canada, and the Transpolar Sea Route, which goes directly through the Arctic. However, the availability of these routes depends on the amount of ice formations present in the summer time.

With the trend of increasing routes through the north, but with limitations due to winter weather and ice caps, this region is expected to see only about two percent of the world maritime trade. Countries with exclusive economic interest in this region seek to preserve a peaceful and safe environment in this region when it comes to territorial claims and commercial development. The Arctic Council, which seeks to promote stability in the region, consists of eight countries that have economic interests in the region: the United States, Canada, Russia, Denmark (by means of Greenland), Iceland, Norway, Sweden, and Finland.
