= Institute of Arctic Biology =

University of Alaska bioresearch facility

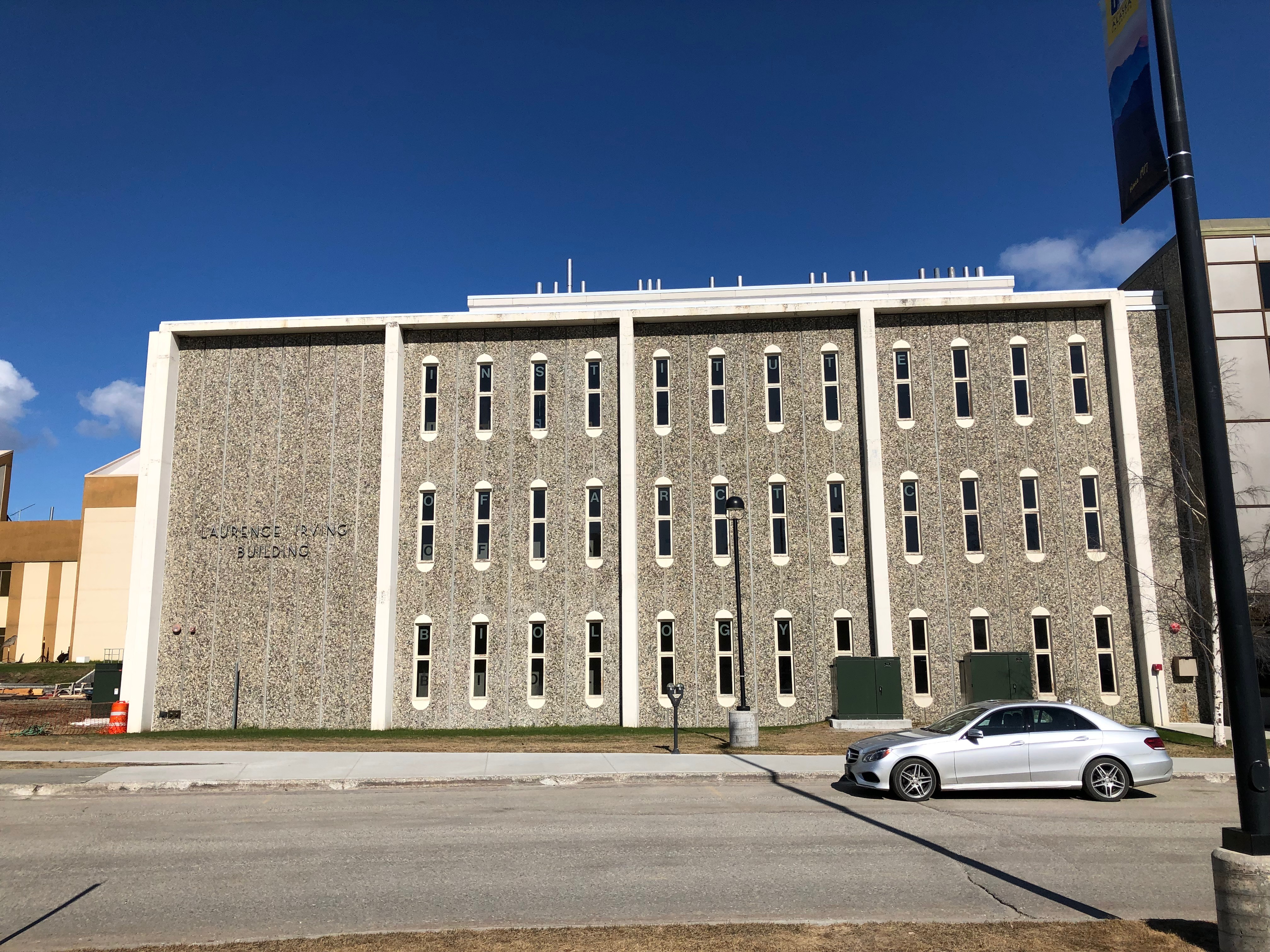
- Institute of Arctic Biology in the Laurence Irving Building, Fairbanks
- Abbreviation: IAB
- Formation: 1963
- Headquarters: Fairbanks, Alaska, US
- Coordinates: 64°51′34″N 147°50′46″W
- Parent organization: University of Alaska Fairbanks
- Website: www.iab.uaf.edu

The Institute of Arctic Biology or IAB of the University of Alaska Fairbanks, is located in Fairbanks, Alaska, US. The institute was established in 1963 by the Board of Regents of the University of Alaska, with Laurence Irving serving as its founding director. The mission of IAB is to advance basic and applied knowledge of high-latitude biological systems through research, education, and service. The Institute supports faculty, post-doctoral, and graduate research in wildlife biology and management, ecology, evolutionary biology, physiology, genetics, biomedicine, bioinformatics, and computational biology. IAB faculty hold joint appointments with other departments at UAF in the College of Natural Science and Mathematics and the School of Natural Resources and Agricultural Sciences.

Important facilities and research programs that the Institute of Arctic Biology supports are:

- The Alaska Cooperative Fish and Wildlife Research Unit (AKCFWRU) is part of a nationwide cooperative program initiated in 1935 to promote research and graduate student training in the ecology and management of fish, wildlife, and their habitats.
- The Alaska Geobotany Center (AGC) is dedicated to understanding northern ecosystems through the use of geographic information systems, remote sensing, field experiments, and cooperative team research projects.
- The Alaska IDeA Networks for Biomedical Research Excellence (AK INBRE) is an Institutional Development Award (IDeA) funded by the National Center for Research Resources (NCRR), a division of the National Institutes of Health (NIH). Alaska INBRE is a statewide program to support new faculty, conduct research, provide new equipment, expand research infrastructure, and train Alaska students in biomedical research.
- The Bonanza Creek Long Term Ecological Research (BNZ LTER) program is located in the boreal forest of interior Alaska, USA. The site was established in Fairbanks, Alaska in 1987 as part of the National Science Foundation's LTER Program.
- The Center for Alaska Native Health Research (CANHR) builds relationships and research-based knowledge to improve the health of Alaskans and Alaska Native people. CANHR works collaboratively with rural communities, organizations, and individuals to support research addressing leading Tribal health priorities in Alaska including: suicide; substance misuse and mental health; child and adolescent health; nutrition, physical activity, and cardiovascular disease; and oral health.
- The Genomics Core Lab is a centralized research facility at the University of Alaska Fairbanks. The Core Lab offers a variety of instruments for genomics, proteomics, analytical chemistry, and other general scientific applications as well as library preparation, sequencing services, and support and training for a varied suite of molecular biology and analytical chemistry instrumentation.
- The IAB Health and Metabolism Research Core (HaMR Core) provides access to state-of-the-art MR techniques for the UA system. The facility has two NMR spectrometers (300 MHz and 600 MHz) that are able to perform a wide range of modern NMR techniques on small peptide structure determination, organic teaching chemistry support, metabolomics, and environmental samples. The facility also has a 1.5 Tesla MRI that can be used for both imaging and spectroscopy and a Dual-energy X-Ray Absorptiometry instrument designed to look at lean body mass, adipose tissue, and bone density..
- The IAB Research Greenhouse provides a reliable environment for growing plants for research and educational projects year-round.
- The Toolik Field Station is a world-renowned Arctic climate change research station located in the northern foothills of the Brooks Range, Alaska, US. This location affords access to the Brooks Range, the Arctic Foothills, and the Arctic Coastal Plain. The station also serves as a base camp for researchers working along the ecological transect from tundra to taiga to boreal forest along the Dalton Highway, from Prudhoe Bay to Fairbanks, Alaska.
- The Transformative Research in Metabolism (TRiM) center is an Centers of Biomedical Research Excellence (COBRE) award funded by the National Institutes of Health (NIH). TRiM supports interdisciplinary biomedical research to study hibernation and metabolism with the long-term goal of developing therapies to treat metabolic diseases such as diabetes, obesity, sarcopenia, and cardiovascular disease.

== See also ==
- LTER
- NEON
