= International Arctic Buoy Program =

Programme to provide meteorological and oceanographic data

The International Arctic Buoy Program is headquartered at the Polar Science Center, Applied Physics Laboratory, University of Washington, in Seattle, Washington, United States. The program's objectives include to provide meteorological and oceanographic data in order to support operations and research for UNESCO's World Climate Research Programme and the World Weather Watch Programme of the United Nations' World Meteorological Organization.

IABP participating countries include Canada, China, France, Germany, Japan, Norway, Russia, and the United States. Together, they share the costs of the program.

The IABP has deployed more than 700 buoys since it began operations in 1991, succeeding the Arctic Ocean Buoy Program (operational since 1979-01-19). Commonly, 25 to 40 buoys operate at any given time and provide real-time position, pressure, temperature, and interpolated ice velocity. In support of the International Polar Year, the IABP will deploy over 120 buoys, at over 80 different locations, during the period of April–August 2008.

The organization's annual meeting provides discussion on instrumentation, forecasting, observations, and outlook.
