= Vittorio Sanseverino =

- Born: September 29, 1917; Naples
- Died: November 30, 2010 (aged 93); Turin
- Military career
- Allegiance: Kingdom of Italy; Italy
- Branch: Regia Aeronautica (1938–1945); Italian Co-Belligerent Air Force (1943–45); Aeronautica Militare Italiana (1946–1977).
- Service years: 1938–1977
- Rank: Colonnello (Colonel)
- Unit: 18 Stormo
- Conflicts: World War II
- Other work: test pilot for Fiat Aviazione (later Aeritalia).

Vittorio Sanseverino (September 29, 1917 – November 30, 2010) was an Italian pilot. Besides his combat experience in World War II, he is known for having test-flown a large part of the aircraft built by FIAT for the postwar Italian Air Force, including the Fiat G.91, the Fiat G.222, the North American F-86D Sabre and the F-104 Starfighter.

== Biography ==
=== Early training ===
After leaving the Gymnasium he was admitted into the "Nunziatella" Royal Military Academy and into the Sparviero (Sparrow) course of the Royal Italian Air Force Academy in Caserta. He was trained to fly on Breda Ba.25s and I.M.A.M. Ro.41s at Capua airfield. He first flew solo on 7 February 1938.

Having committed an act of indiscipline in flight, he was moved to the Malpensa Bombardment School as a punishment measure. There he flew Fiat BR.20s and Savoia-Marchetti S.M.81s. In 1940 he was assigned to 65 Squadriglia, 31 Gruppo of 18 Stormo based at Aviano airfield.

=== World War II ===
During the Second World War he received his baptism of fire on 8 April 1941 in Yugoslavian skies, at the controls of a BR.20. He became the commander of a bomber squadron and also flew Fiat CR.42s and CANT Z.1007s. After the Armistice between Italy and Allied armed forces (8 September 1943) he sided with the Allies and was an instructor on both Martin 187 Baltimores and Lockheed P-38 Lightnings. On 24 August 1944 he witnessed the death of torpedo bomber ace Carlo Emanuele Buscaglia, who crashed on take-off from Campo Vesuvio airfield with a Baltimore bomber.

=== Post-World War II ===
At the end of the war he was assigned to the Reparto Sperimentale Volo (Experimental Wing) of the re-established Italian Air Force based at Guidonia. On 23 July 1952 he flew the first Italian de Havilland DH.100 Vampire, built under licence by Fiat and Macchi. In 1953 he left the Air Force with the rank of Colonnello (Colonel), and was hired by Fiat Aviazione where he worked as a test pilot for Vittorio Valletta and Giuseppe Gabrielli. He tested the first all-Italian jet aircraft, the Fiat G.80, and later the Fiat G.82 and the licence-built North American F-86K. He also flew the Aeritalia G-91Y for the first time, as well as all the Italian-made F-104 Starfighters. On 18 July 1970 he participated in the maiden flight of the Aeritalia G.222 prototype with co-pilot Pietro Paolo Trevisan. He remained in service until 1977 when the early tests of the Panavia Tornado began.

== Bibliography ==
- Sanseverino, Vittorio (2006). Le nuvole sotto... Autobiografia di un pilota collaudatore. LoGisma. ISBN 88-87621-62-4.

== See also ==
- Aeritalia G-91Y
- Alenia G.222
- Fiat G.80
- Lockheed F-104 Starfighter
- North American F-86D Sabre
