= Fiat G.8 =

G.8
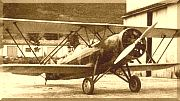

General information
- Type: Utility aircraft
- Manufacturer: Fiat
- Designer: Giuseppe Gabrielli
- Primary user: Regia Aeronautica
- Number built: 61

History
- First flight: 24 February 1934
- Retired: 1950

The Fiat G.8 was a military utility aircraft produced in Italy in the mid-1930s. Its design and production were undertaken at the CMASA works in Pisa which became part of Fiat in 1930, hence the type is sometimes referred to as the CMASA G.8 or Fiat-CMASA G.8. It was a conventional biplane design with staggered wings of unequal span braced by struts arranged in a Warren truss. The pilot and a single passenger (or instructor) sat in tandem open cockpits, and the aircraft was fitted with fixed tailskid undercarriage with divided main units.

Sixty of these aircraft were purchased by the Regia Aeronautica and used for liaison and training duties.

== Operators ==
Kingdom of Italy

- Regia Aeronautica
- Aviazione Legionaria
- Italian Co-Belligerent Air Force

Italy

- Aeronautica Nazionale Repubblicana

Italy

- Italian Air Force operated three Fiat G.8s until 1950

Spain

- Spanish Air Force

== Specifications ==
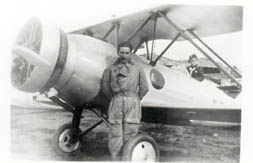

Data from Dimensione Cielo

General characteristics

- Crew: 2
- Length: 7.00 m (23 ft 0 in)
- Wingspan: 8.76 m (28 ft 9 in)
- Height: 2.50 m (8 ft 2 in)
- Wing area: 18.91 m^{2} (203.5 sq ft)
- Empty weight: 560 kg (1,235 lb)
- Gross weight: 840 kg (1,852 lb)
- Powerplant: 1 × Fiat A.54 , 101 kW (135 hp)

Performance

- Maximum speed: 212 km/h (132 mph, 114 kn)
- Stall speed: 84 km/h (52 mph, 45 kn)
- Range: 925 km (575 mi, 499 nmi)
- Service ceiling: 5,200 m (17,100 ft)
- Time to altitude: 17 minutes 41 s to 3,000 m (9,800 ft)
