= Fiat Aviazione =

Italian aircraft manufacturer

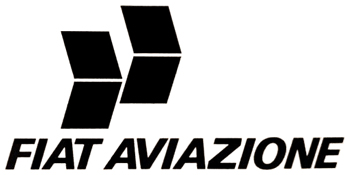
- Type: Private
- Industry: Aeronautics
- Founded: 1908
- Founder: Giovanni Agnelli
- Defunct: 1969; 57 years ago
- Fate: Merged with Aerfer
- Successor: Aeritalia
- Headquarters: Turin, Italy
- Key people: Giuseppe Gabrielli; Celestino Rosatelli
- Products: Aircraft

Fiat Aviazione was an Italian aircraft manufacturer, at one time part of the Fiat group, focused mainly on military aviation. After World War I, Fiat consolidated several Italian small aircraft manufacturers, like Pomilio and Ansaldo. Most famous were the Fiat biplane fighter aircraft of the 1930s, the Fiat CR.32 and the Fiat CR.42. Other notable designs were the fighters CR.20, G.50, G.55 and a bomber, the Fiat BR.20. In the 1950s, the company designed the G.91 light ground attack plane.

In 1969, Fiat Aviazione merged with Aerfer to create Aeritalia, which would become Alenia Aeronautica in 1990.

== History ==
=== The beginning ===
In 1908, aeronautical production started taking its first steps in Turin, by Fiat, with the decision to design and produce an engine, the SA 8/75, derived from racing cars. It was the beginning of a centennial story whose heritage is today linked directly to Avio. The first mass-produced engine produced by Fiat was the A10, created in 1,070 units between 1914 and 1915: at this point the pioneer age had come to an end and the company decided to design and construct complete aircraft (1969). Thus in 1916 the Società Italiana Aviazione was founded, changing its name in 1918 to Fiat.

In Turin, besides aircraft engines, and always along the lines of the internal-combustion engine, Fiat diversified production with the constitution in 1909 of Fiat San Giorgio for marine diesel engines, the area from which activities in the field of industrial engines for electric power generation later ensued. In Colleferro (Rome), the Bombrini Parodi-Delfino-BPD Company, established in Genoa in 1912, started manufacturing explosives and chemical products, from which the space segment originated.

In the aeronautical sector, the company established operations in Brindisi through the SACA Company. Additional operations included CMASA di Marina in Pisa, founded in 1921 by German aircraft designer Claude Dornier in collaboration with Rinaldo Piaggio and Attilio Odero. Over time, the company also collaborated with international aerospace manufacturers including General Electric, Rolls-Royce, Pratt & Whitney and Eurocopter, with some of these partnerships dating back more than 50 years.

=== From biplanes to jet aircraft ===
After the first pioneering design of aircraft engines at the beginning of the twentieth century, against the opinion of over-cautious directors towards new technologies and areas of activity, Giovanni Agnelli, one of Fiat's founder members, and technical director Guido Fornaca, supported aeronautical production, and started up on an industrial basis during the Great War to meet military orders. Therefore, the Società Italiana Aviazione (Italian Aviation Company) was established in 1916, and later passed to the Aviation Section of Fiat in 1918. The first mass-produced aeronautical engine (over 1,000 units), the Fiat A.10, was installed in several aircraft between 1914 and 1915, such as the Farman, later produced under licence, and the three-engined Caproni bomber aircraft.

=== After the First World War ===
At the end of the First World War, the technical and production resources accumulated during the conflict were directed at the emerging sector of the commercial aeroplane. The production of complete aircraft, already started up with the SP series, intensified under the guidance of design engineer Celestino Rosatelli who began his collaboration with Fiat in 1918. For about fifteen years, Rosatelli contributed to the famous CR and BR fighter and bomber aircraft while, thanks to its highly technical and reliable engines, Fiat aircraft had a run of world records: power, with the A14 of 700HP produced between 1917 and 1919; speed, with the 300 km/h achieved by the R700 in 1921; speed and airworthiness, with the AS2 engine that, installed on the Idromacchi M20, established the speed record for seaplanes and won the prestigious Schneider Cup in America in 1926; and speed again, with the new record attained by Francesco Agello in 1934 in an aeroplane powered by the Fiat AS6 engine of 3,100HP.

=== Merger with the Società Aeronautica d’Italia ===
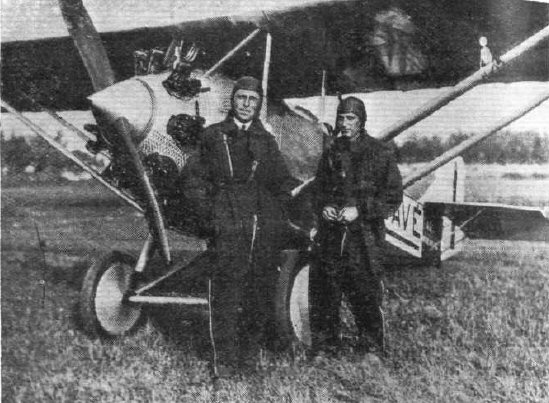
A Fiat AS.1 pictured in 1930

In 1926, with the acquisition of the Ansaldo factory in Corso Francia, Turin, Fiat Aviazione merged with the Società Aeronautica d’Italia (Italian Aeronautical Company). In 1931, Vittorio Valletta, the then General Manager of Fiat, employed a young design engineer, Giuseppe Gabrielli, to head the Aviation Technical Office. In 1934, the acquisition of the CMASA Company marked the entry of Fiat into the production of seaplanes. A great many of the targets achieved in the subsequent thirty-year period were linked to the genius of Gabrielli who quickly made a name for himself, beginning with the G2, a commercial plane with six seats besides the pilot, destined to be used by the Società Aviolinee Italiane (Italian Airline Company), with Fiat as majority shareholder, which boasted original innovations and developments under six patents.

While investments in the passenger and cargo transport sector continued with the opening up of European routes by civil airlines which used G18 and APR2 twin-engine monoplanes, the G50 was produced in 1937, in the CMASA factory in Marina di Pisa, the first single-seater fighter plane employed by the Italian Air Force.

=== After the Second World War ===
In 1949, having overcome the uncertainties and difficulties of the Second World War, the Fiat aeronautical activities were reorganised in the Aviation area. Delays in the production typologies accumulated in the years of autarchy were soon overcome thanks to the technical competences of Gabrielli and the new climate of Atlantic and inter-European collaboration. Already in 1951, Gabrielli had designed the G.80, the first Italian jet aircraft powered by a De Havilland “Goblin” turbojet engine.

In the early 1950s, Fiat Aviazione started a production revival by means of American orders and, in particular, was the only company in Europe to obtain the licence from NATO for the construction of the F86 K. It entered into an agreement with General Electric and Pratt & Whitney for the production of jet engine components. The experience acquired through this work allowed the company to participate in the international call for tenders by NATO in 1954 for a light tactical fighter aircraft. The following year, the Italian project, named G.91, obtained the order for three prototypes, in the same way as the English and French competitors, and then emerged as the winner, with the final decision being made in 1958. The G91 was affirmed as NATO's standard light fighter aircraft in the European zone, becoming the most important Italian postwar aircraft with over 700 planes produced, for the most part exported.

In 1961, Fiat Aviazione took on the role of Italian prime contractor for the NATO F-104G aircraft and, under these circumstances, established collaboration relations with the Alfa Romeo Avio Company in Pomigliano d’Arco, near Naples, directly controlled by the Finmeccanica State Company. From the middle of the 1950s, under the guidance of the engineer Stefanutti, Alfa Romeo Avio had also intensified collaboration relations with Rolls-Royce and General Electric for aeronautical engines. In the second half of the 1960s, following consistent orders of the DC-9 for the national flagship airline Alitalia, controlled by the IRI State Company, the collaboration began between McDonnell Douglas and Aerfer, an aeronautical and railway Construction Company established by Finmeccanica in 1950 on part of the Aeronautical Centre in Pomigliano d’Arco.

=== Setting up of the Aeritalia Company ===
In 1969, Fiat and Finmeccanica set up the Aeritalia Company, who Fiat entrusted with the aircraft activities.

Subsequently, through different international collaborations, Pomigliano d’Arco specialised in the development and production of components for the “hot parts” of jet engines and the overhaul of civil aero engines. Fiat concentrated instead on aero engines and transmissions for helicopters, assembled by Fiat Aviazione in 1976, with 3,700 employees, with production centres in Turin and Brindisi.

This choice was consistent with the transformation of the aeronautical industry's worldwide scenario, characterised by the formation of just a few large groups and growing specialisation and internationalisation. A twofold necessity ensued, on the one side, to put into the field collaborations crucial to bringing together the financial resources and technological competences required by an increasingly sophisticated production in the area of materials, electronics and safety systems and, on the other, to identify areas of specialisation in which to play a leading role at a worldwide level. The programme of refinement and improvement of quality control was a strategic factor that gave rise to Fiat Aviazione's success during those years.

=== Changing the name to Fiat Avio ===
With the change of the company name to Fiat Avio in 1989, the Turin Company collaborated on the design and manufacturer of propulsion systems for the Panavia Tornado and Harrier jump jet (vertical/short takeoff and landing) in the military sector, and Boeing and Airbus in the commercial one, to mention the most important examples in both military and commercial fields.

In 1997, the acquisition of the controlling stake in Alfa Romeo Avio from Finmeccanica was key to a national strategic project aimed at reducing the excessive fragmentation of the Italian companies and at increasing competitiveness through more systematic synergies.

== Products ==
=== Aircraft ===
- Fiat AN.1
- Fiat APR.2
- Fiat AS.1

Giuseppe Gabrielli series

- Fiat G.2
- Fiat G.5
- Fiat G.8
- Fiat G.12
- Fiat G.18
- Fiat G.46
- Fiat G.49
- Fiat G.50
- Fiat G.55
- Fiat G.61
- Fiat G.80
- Fiat G.82
- Fiat G.91
- Fiat G.91Y
- Fiat G.212
- Fiat G.222

Aldo Guglielmetti series

- Fiat BGA

Celestino Rosatelli series

- Fiat B.R.
- Fiat B.R.1
- Fiat B.R.2
- Fiat BR.20
- Fiat BRG
- Fiat C.29
- Fiat CR.1
- Fiat CR.20
- Fiat CR.25
- Fiat CR.30
- Fiat CR.32
- Fiat C.R.33
- Fiat C.R.40
- Fiat C.R.41
- Fiat CR.42
- Fiat R.2
- Fiat R.22
- Fiat-Ansaldo A.120
- Fiat-Ansaldo A.S.1
- Fiat CANSA F.C. 12
- Fiat CANSA F.C.20
- Fiat RS.14
- Fiat M.F.4

Helicopters

- Fiat 7002

=== Aircraft engines ===
- Fiat SA8/75
- Fiat S.55
- Fiat A.10
- Fiat A.12
- Fiat A.14
- Fiat A.15
- Fiat A.20
- Fiat A.22
- Fiat A.24
- Fiat A.25
- Fiat A.30
- Fiat A.50
- Fiat A.53
- Fiat A.54
- Fiat A.55
- Fiat A.58
- Fiat A.59
- Fiat A.60
- Fiat A.74
- Fiat A.76
- Fiat A.78
- Fiat A.80
- Fiat A.82
- Fiat AS.2 Schneider Trophy 1926
- Fiat AS.3
- Fiat AS.5 Schneider Trophy 1929
- Fiat AS.6 Schneider Trophy 1931
- Fiat AN.1 Diesel
- Fiat 4002
- Fiat 4004
- Fiat 4301
- Fiat 4700

== See also ==
- Aeritalia
- Alenia Aeronautica
- List of Italian companies
