= Fiat G.80 =

1950s Italian military trainer aircraft prototype

G.80/G.82
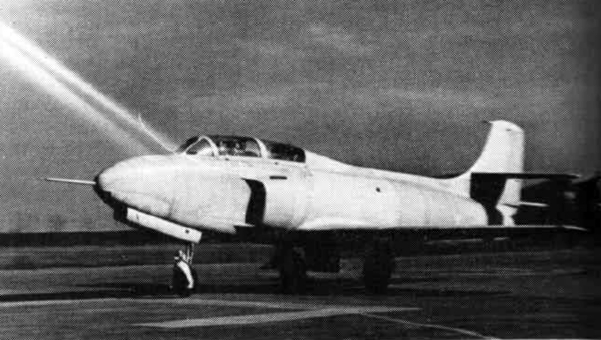
- Fiat G.80

General information
- Type: Trainer
- Manufacturer: Fiat
- Designer: Giuseppe Gabrielli
- Primary user: Italian Air Force
- Number built: 2 prototypes + 3 Fiat G.80; 2 prototypes + 4 Fiat G.82

History
- First flight: 9 December 1951
- Retired: 1955

The Fiat G.80 was a military jet trainer designed and produced by the Italian aircraft manufacturer Fiat. It has the distinction of being the first true jet-powered indigenous aircraft to be flown by Italy.

The G.80 was designed as the first Italian turbojet-powered aircraft to fulfil the training requirements of the Aeronautica Militare. It was a conventional low-wing monoplane with retractable tricycle undercarriage and engine air intakes on the fuselage sides; it was powered by a single British-sourced de Havilland Goblin turbojet engine. The pilot and instructor sat in a tandem configuration underneath a lengthy bubble canopy. On 9 December 1951, the first prototype G.80 performed its maiden flight. Two prototypes and three preproduction aircraft were built, however, quantity production of the G.80 did not proceed after the Aeronautica Militare found it did not fulfil their requirements after a formal evaluation.

Fiat opted to continue development, producing the more refined G.82 powered by the Rolls-Royce Nene engine; the company also proposed various specialised versions of the aircraft, including a night fighter, aerial reconnaissance, and close-support models. Alternative engines, including the Allison J35, were also explored. The G.82 was submitted to a NATO competition seeking a standard jet trainer, but this effort would not result in an order either. Fiat ultimately opted to shelve development of the type. The handful of aircraft produced were flown by the Aeronautica Militare for a time, largely for test purposes.

== Design and development ==
In the aftermath of the Second World War, several parties was keen for Italy to enter the jet age and to revitalise its aircraft industry. In particular, the Aeronautica Militare had an acknowledged need for a new jet trainer for the instruction of its pilots on modern aircraft. One of Italy's traditional aircraft manufacturers, Fiat, was also seeking to reassert itself in the field, and thus decided to embark on the design of an indigenous twin-seat jet aircraft suitable for the trainer role, designated G.80. The company's design team produced an aircraft that featured all‐metal construction, a tandem seating configuration, and was equipped with a pressurised cabin, a swept wing, and retractable tricycle landing gear. The powerplant selected was a single British-sourced de Havilland Goblin turbojet engine.

A pair of prototypes were built, which were eventually followed by three preproduction aircraft. On 9 December 1951, the first prototype G.80 performed its maiden flight, during the subsequent flight test programme, it demonstrated the ability to attain speeds of up to 522 MPH. While the interest of the Aeronautica Militare was such that a formal evaluation of the G.80 was conducted, it ultimately determined that the aircraft was unsuitable for their requirements; specifically, it was found to be underpowered and heavier than competing international aircraft such as the Fokker S.14 Machtrainer. Thus, the service did not opt to procure the G.80 in any operational capacity.

Undeterred, Fiat chose to develop a more refined version, designated the G.82. This variant featured numerous refinements and detailed changes; the most obvious being an elongated fuselage, the adoption of a Rolls-Royce Nene engine in place of the G.80's de Havilland Goblin, and wingtip tanks. The Nene engine gave the G.82 considerably more power than its predecessor. On 23 May 1954, the G.82 performed its first flight.

The aircraft was submitted as Fiat's response to a NATO competition to select a standard jet trainer. While it proved itself to have superior performance to the American Lockheed T-33, the G.82 lacked the economic advantages associated with the T-33, which was already in widespread service with numerous NATO nations, including Italy. Following the cancellation of the NATO competition and thus the aircraft's failure to be selected either by NATO or the Aeronautica Militare, the company ultimately decided to terminate all work on the G.82's development. At one point, there had been plans for several specialised versions of the aircraft, including night fighter, aerial reconnaissance, and close-support aircraft, yet these went unrealised. Another variant, the G.84, was also envisioned that was to have been powered by a single Allison J35 engine.

The few aircraft produced were used by the Aeronautica Militare, albeit largely for testing purposes. The G.82s were used for several years by the military training school at Amendola before being transferred to the Reparto Sperimentale Volo ("Department of Experimental Flight") during 1957.

== Variants ==
- G.80-1B - prototype (two built)
- G.80-3B - pre-production version (three built)
- G.81 - definitive production version of G.80 (not built, development cancelled in favour of G.82)
- G.82 - prototypes for NATO competition (two built) and four production
- G.84 - Allison J35-powered version (not built)

== Operators ==
Italy

- Italian Air Force

== Specifications (G.82) ==
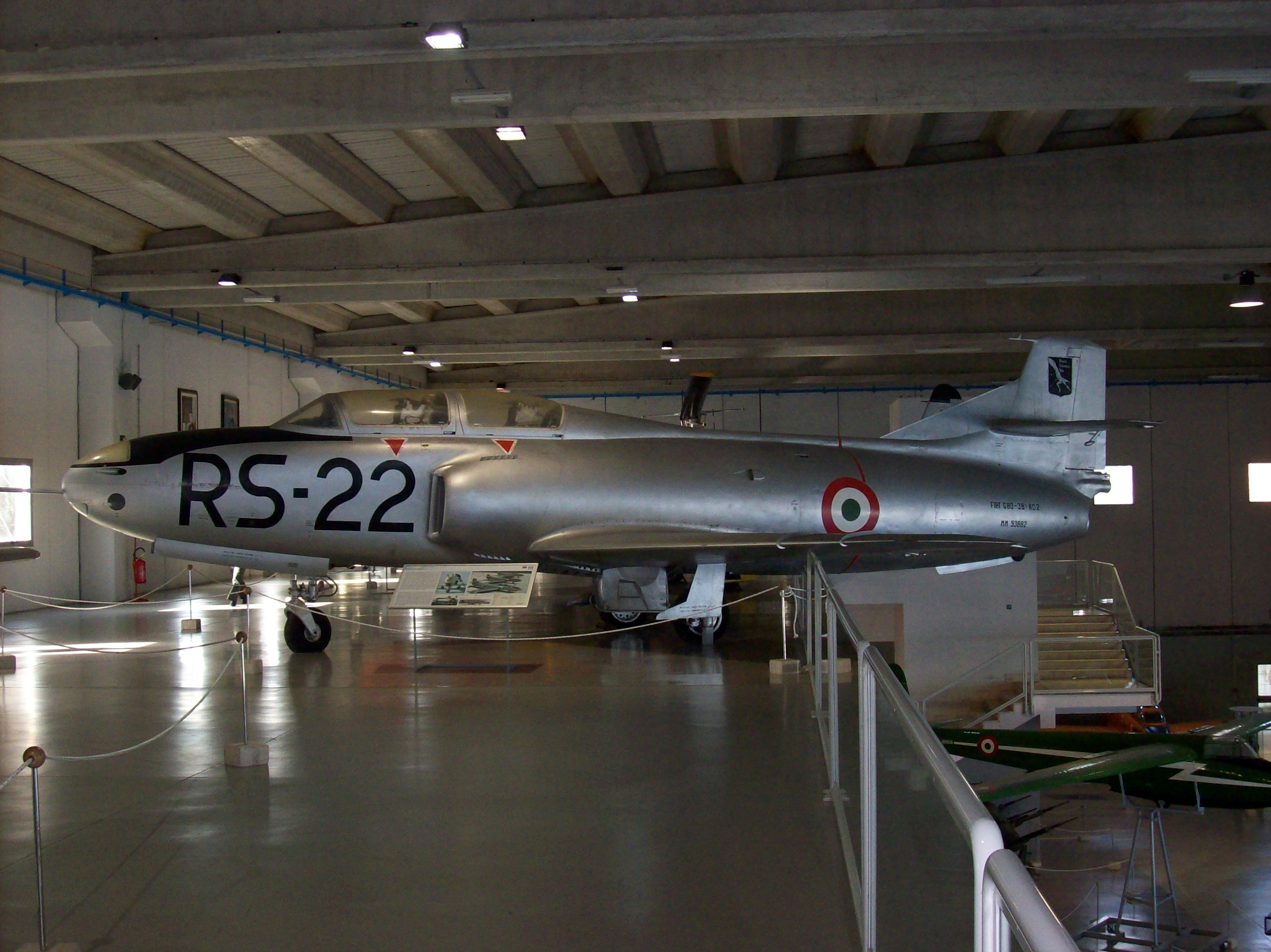
Fiat G.80-3 formerly operated by the Italian Air Force in the museum Vigna di Valle

Data from Jane's All The World's Aircraft 1956–57.

General characteristics

- Crew: two
- Length: 12.93 m (42 ft 5 in)
- Wingspan: 11.81 m (38 ft 9 in)
- Height: 4.08 m (13 ft 5 in)
- Wing area: 25.14 m^{2} (270.6 sq ft)
- Aspect ratio: 4.82:1
- Empty weight: 4,400 kg (9,700 lb)
- Gross weight: 6,250 kg (13,779 lb)
- Max takeoff weight: 7,000 kg (15,432 lb)
- Fuel capacity: 1,755 L (386 imp gal; 464 US gal) (including tip tanks)
- Powerplant: 1 × Rolls-Royce Nene 2/21 turbojet, 22 kN (5,000 lbf) thrust

Performance

- Maximum speed: 910 km/h (570 mph, 490 kn)
- Stall speed: 180 km/h (110 mph, 97 kn)
- Range: 1,600 km (990 mi, 860 nmi)
- Service ceiling: 12,500 m (41,000 ft)
- Time to altitude: five minutes and 30 seconds to 6,000 metres (20,000 ft)

Armament

- Guns: 2× fixed, forward-firing 12.7 mm (.5 in) Colt-Browning M3 machine guns
- Rockets: 8× HVAR
- Bombs: 2× 230 kg (500 lb)

== See also ==
- Vittorio Sanseverino, the test pilot who flew the aircraft on its maiden flight.
