= Fiat G.50 Freccia =

Italian fighter

G.50 Freccia
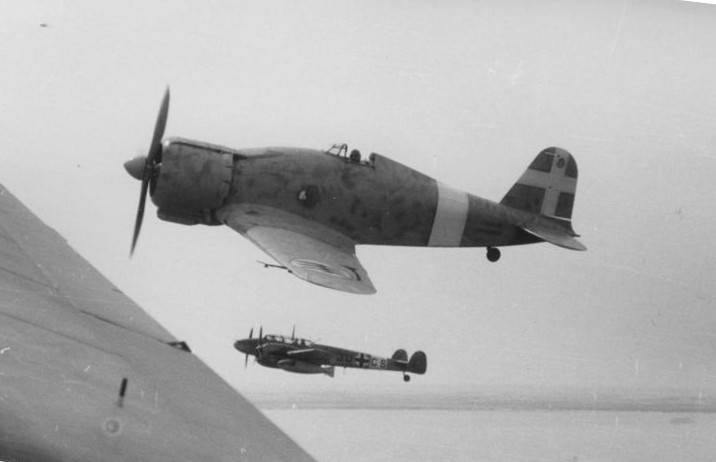
- A Regia Aeronautica G.50 flying with a Luftwaffe Messerschmitt Bf 110 over North Africa in 1941

General information
- Type: Fighter aircraft
- Manufacturer: Fiat
- Designer: Giuseppe Gabrielli
- Status: Retired
- Primary users: Regia Aeronautica Finnish Air Force; Ejército del Aire; Luftwaffe
- Number built: 778

History
- Manufactured: 1935–1943
- Introduction date: 1938
- First flight: 26 February 1937
- Retired: 1946 Finnish Air Force
- Variant: Fiat G.55

The Fiat G.50 Freccia (Arrow) was an Italian fighter aircraft of the Second World War that was developed and manufactured by Fiat Aviazione. On 26 February 1937, the G.50 conducted its maiden flight. On entering service, the type was Italy's first single-seat, metal monoplane, with an enclosed cockpit and retractable undercarriage. During early 1938, the Freccias served in the Regia Aeronautica (the Italian Royal Air Force) and with its expeditionary arm, the Aviazione Legionaria (Air Force Legion) in Spain, where they compared well in speed and manoeuvrability with their adversaries.

The fighter operated in Northern Europe, North Africa, the Balkans and the Italian mainland. The G.50 was commonly opposed by the British Hurricane, that was fast enough frequently to out-run the G.50 and had longer range. Early in the war it became apparent that the pair of Breda-SAFAT 12.7-mm machine guns on the G.50 as inadequate. Later models of the fighter incorporated improvements, including an increase in fuel capacity that gave a substantial increase in range.

The G.50 was exported to several countries, small numbers being flown by the Croatian Air Force and 35 G.50s were exported to Finland, where they served with distinction in the Winter War (1939–1940) and the Continuation War (1941–1944) against the Soviet Union. In Finnish service, the type reportedly achieved an unprecedented kill/loss ratio of 33/1.

== Development ==
=== Background ===
The Fiat G.50 had its origins in a design produced for Fiat Aviazione by Giuseppe Gabrielli an Italian aeronautics engineer in place of its chief engineer Celestino Rosatelli. The design was influenced by a specification during 1936 that sought a modern interceptor aircraft for the Regia Aeronautica (Italian Royal Air Force). Gabrielli started work in April 1935 and his design was the most advanced yet produced in Italy for a fighter. Construction of two prototypes began mid-summer 1936 and manufacturing was turned over to CMASA (Costruzioni Meccaniche Aeronautiche S.A.) a subsidiary of Fiat at Marina di Pisa.

=== Design ===
The Fiat G.50 was a low-wing single-engine monoplane fighter interceptor. It featured all-metal construction, comprising a semi-monocoque fuselage with an exterior skin composed of light alloys. The structure of the fuselage was formed from four main longerons and 17 formers, closing into a load-bearing bulkhead forming the rear of the fuselage. The wings were divided into three separate sections, composed of a steel tube centre-section structure that was paired with duralumin outer wings and an alloy skin. The ailerons, which were both statically and aerodynamically balanced, had a metal structure covered by fabric. Hydraulically-actuated four-piece slotted-flaps were fitted to the aircraft's wings to improve its take-off and landing performance; these would automatically retract upon attaining a certain airspeed.

The G.50 was equipped with retractable landing gear, consisting of inwardly-retracting mainwheels and a castoring tailwheel. It was the first front-line Italian fighter to be fitted with a retractable undercarriage, an enclosed cockpit, and a constant-speed propeller; these improvements have been credited with enabling the G.50 to achieve a maximum speed that was 33 km/h (21 mph) faster than its contemporary, the Fiat CR.42 biplane.The G.50 was a "robust and viceless aircraft which marked the introduction of new concepts and techniques, of design and manufacture" (Cattaneo, 1967).

Powered by a single Fiat A.74 R.C.38 14-cylinder air-cooled supercharged radial engine, rated at 870 hp (650 kW) for take-off and 960 hp (720 kW) at 3,800 m (12,500 ft), enclosed in a NACA cowling and mounted upon a chrome-molybdenum steel tubular structure attached with flexible mounts. Access for maintenance of the engine was provided via large cowling doors and panels on the fuselage aft of the firewall gave access for fuel tanks and armament. The engine incorporated a reduction gear which drove the Hamilton-Fiat 3-bladed all-metal constant speed propeller.

The pilot sat in an enclosed cockpit under a sliding transparent canopy; the seat was adjustable in height and angle of inclination to suit the pilot. Despite the canopy possessing favourable transparency, including a relatively unobstructed rearward view, pilots were unenthusiastic about the enclosed arrangement, leading to various types of open canopies being trialled and eventually a set of hinged transparent side-flaps were standardised upon. A reflector sight was present for the purpose of aiming the fighter's armament, which comprised a pair of 12.7 mm (.5 in) Breda-SAFAT machine guns with 150 rounds of ammunition per gun. The machine guns, fitted directly forward of the cockpit, were fired using synchronisation gear to fire through the propeller arc; single-shot and salvo-fire were available.

=== Flight tests ===
On 26 February 1937, at Caselle airfield, Turin, Comandante Giovanni de Briganti, the chief test pilot for the G.50 programme, flew the prototype on its maiden flight. The aircraft recorded a top speed of 472 km/h (293 mph) and climbed to 6,000 m (20,000 ft) in six minutes, 40 seconds. During October 1937, it was unveiled to the public at the Milan International Aeronautical Show. During 1937, along with the first pre-series machines, a gruppo sperimentale (experimental group) was formed. Experience with the G.50 revealed it to possess relatively light controls and to be extremely manoeuvrable for a monoplane in comparison with prior designs. The limited power output of its radial engine and the lack of firepower, consisting of only a pair of machine guns were criticised.

During September 1937, Fiat received an order for 45 aircraft. In advance of the placement of a larger order, the Italian Air Ministry decided to hold a round of comparative 'fly-off' test flights between the G.50 and the new Macchi MC.200. On 8 November 1937, de Briganti was killed during the sixth evaluation flight of the second prototype (M.M.335) when the fighter failed to pull out of a high-speed dive. Flight tests conducted at Guidonia showed that the aircraft went too readily into an spin, a highly dangerous trait, especially at low altitude, where recovery was impossible.

During a visit by the King Victor Emmanuel III and the Prime Minister Benito Mussolini, another tragedy occurred at Guidonia. While performing a low, fast pass, three G.50s flown by experienced pilots, Maggiore (Squadron Leader) Mario Bonzano, with pilots Beretta and Marasco, got into difficulty. Beretta's aircraft spun and crashed into the ammunition laboratory, killing the pilot. Despite the crashes, results from the flight test programme were deemed satisfactory. The Freccia proved to be more manoeuvrable than the faster Macchi MC.200 and the G.50 was declared the winner of the Caccia I (Fighter One) competition on 9 June 1938. On account of its manoeuvrability, the Regia Aeronautica Commission decided to order the G.50 as well, rejecting the competition's third contender, the IMAM Ro.51.

=== Initial orders ===
Production aircraft commenced delivery to the Regia Aeronautica in early 1939. Reportedly, Italian pilots did not like the enclosed canopy because it could not be opened quickly and being constructed from plexiglas of poor quality, was prone to cracking or abrasion by sand or dust, limiting visibility. Exhaust fumes tended to accumulate in the cockpit, so pilots would often fly the fighter with the canopy locked open. An open cockpit was installed in the second batch of 200 machines. After 1939, the bulk of production for the G.50 was transferred to the CMASA factory in Marina di Pisa, Tuscany. The first versions of the G.50 could carry either one or a pair of 12.7 mm (0.50 in) Breda-SAFAT machine guns in the nose and a pair of 7.7 mm (0.30 in) Breda-SAFAT machine-guns in the wings. Later versions of the aircraft could be distinguished by a larger rudder.

=== Further development ===
During 1938, the Regia Aeronautica requested that two-seat trainer variant of the G.50 be developed as the G.50/B (Bicomando, dual control). The first of these were constructed during the second half of 1939. The student pilot sat in the front in a closed cockpit with two roll bars. The first five aircraft were part of the 1a serie (series 1). Further production was entrusted to CMASA, who completed 106 G.50/Bs. One G.50/B was later altered into a reconnaissance aircraft, which was equipped with a planimetric camera. Another G.50/B was adapted with a tailhook to operate as a naval reconnaissance aircraft from the aircraft carrier Aquila but the vessel was never completed. During September 1940, a slightly improved version, the G.50 bis was produced with longer range, from an extra 104 L (27 US gal) tank, increasing its range from 645 km (401 mi) to 1,000 km (620 mi).

The ultimate version of the fighter was the G.50/V (Veloce, fast) built in mid-1941 by CMASA and equipped with a Daimler-Benz DB 601 engine of 1,075 CV. During tests at Fiat Aviazione's airfield in Turin, it reached a top speed of 570 km/h (350 mph) in level flight and climbed to 6,000 m (20,000 ft) in five minutes 30 seconds. Gabrielli had already designed the Fiat G.55 and Fiat had obtained the licence to build the 1,475 CV Daimler-Benz DB 605, so the G.50/V was used to test new equipment and then scrapped. Production of the G.50 reached 784 aircraft; 426 built by Fiat Aviazione and another 358 being built by CMASA. Thirteen G.50s were exported to Spain, 35 to Finland and ten to Croatia.

Two of the G.50 aircraft to be delivered to Finland were lost due to a lack of fuel en route. On 7 March, Sergeant Asser Wallius forgot to switch the fuel pump to the main tank and the G.50 (FA-8) crashed, injuring the pilot. On 8 March, a Hungarian volunteer, 2nd Lieutenant Wilmos Belassy in FA-7, apparently dived into the Baltic Sea while crossing from Sweden to Finland after running out of fuel; the aircraft and pilot have not been found. His fellow pilot, 2nd Lieutenant Matias Pirity, had turned back, saving himself and his G.50.

== Operational history ==
=== Aviazione Legionaria ===
During the Spanish Civil War, about twelve G.50s, were dispatched to the Aviazione Legionaria. The first of these were delivered to the theatre during January 1939. The value of its presence in the Spanish theatre is questionable as none of the fighters sent saw actual combat. After the war the G.50s were handed over to Spanish pilots and saw action in Morocco. In 1967, Cattaneo wrote "Little seems to have been learnt as nothing was done to increase the armament".

=== Regia Aeronautica ===
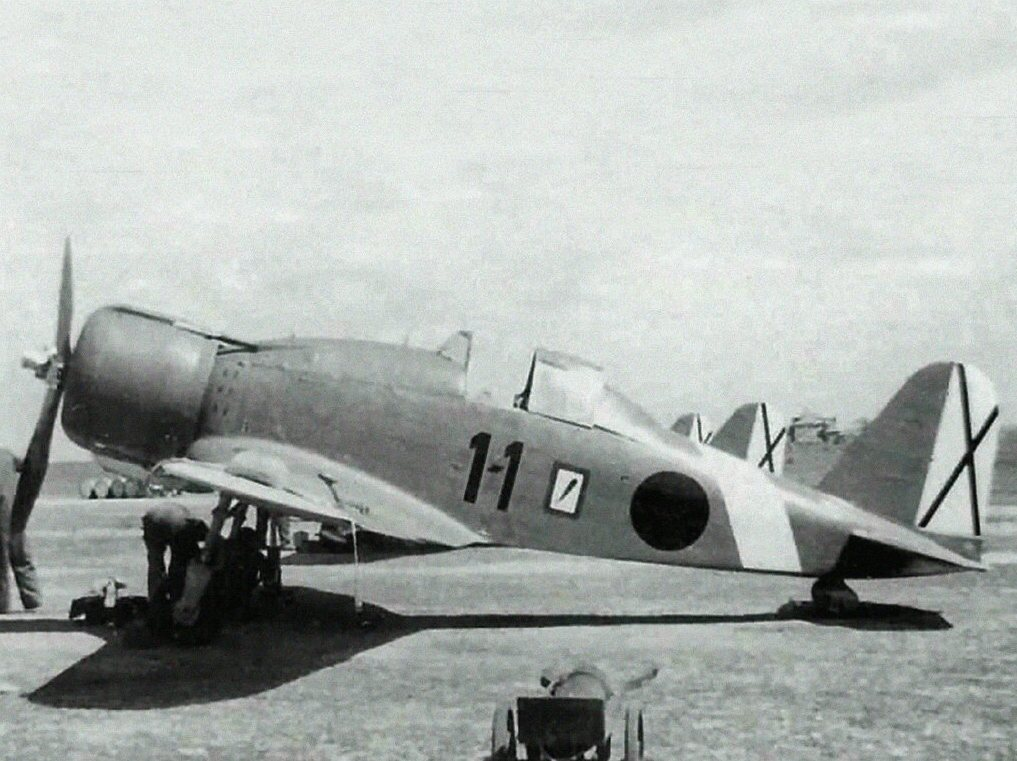
Mario Bonzano's personal Fiat G.50 "1-1", in Spain, January 1939.

During 1938, the first operational Fiat G.50 fighters were delivered to the Regia Aeronautica. The G.5 was widely regarded as highly manoeuvrable and was often considered to be one of Italy's best fighters. By the Second World War, the type was considered to be under-powered and under-armed. Before Italy joined the war further units of the Regia Aeronautica were equipped with G.50s; these were heavily used in various exercises and war-games from November 1939. In June 1940, the Regia Aeronautica had 118 G.50s; of these, 97 were operational while others were under repair or awaiting delivery. Most G.50s were in 51° Stormo, (group) which was based at Ciampino Airport (just outside Rome) and at Pontedera, with 22° Gruppo (wing) of 52° Stormo. On 10 June, when Italy declared war on France and Great Britain, the 22° Gruppo went into action, followed by the 48 aircraft of 20° Gruppo. Operations were sporadic and varied, often escorting Savoia-Marchetti SM.79 bombers on raids against harbours and airfields on Corsica.

=== The Battle of Britain ===
During September 1940, the 351ª, 352ª, 353ª Squadriglie, 20° Gruppo (Maggiore Bonzano) 56° Stormo CT, equipped with Fiat G.50s, formed to operate during the Battle of Britain in the Corpo Aereo Italiano (CAI, Italian Air Corps) based in Belgium, with the 18° Gruppo flying Fiat CR.42s. The Italian government had decided to participate in the German air offensive against Britain out of political opportunism and in pursuit of prestige. The Air Staff would have preferred for the aircraft to be sent to Greece and North Africa where they were needed more.

On the Channel coast, the G.50 was hampered by its relatively slow speed, open cockpits, short range and an endurance of one hour. Poor weather and the use of poorly-trained personnel also undermined the fighter's effectiveness. The G.50s were the early model with an open canopy, which was useful in a typical Mediterranean climate but led to the pilots suffer in the colder weather of northern Europe. The aircraft were under-equipped, with a mediocre radio set (powered by batteries that were prone to freeze at altitude) and lacked armour protection. The Luftwaffe provided a small 17 kg (37 lb) armour plate for the pilot's seat, a life jacket and some other technical help.

The G.50 bis, with larger fuel tanks, was already in production but it was not sent to 20° Gruppo in time to participate. On 5 November 1940, 22 G.50s intercepted several Hurricanes that escaped with ease. On 21 November 1940, when a Blenheim attacked Flugplatz Maldegem in Belgium, the G,50 base, a pair of G.50s were scrambled but they lost the bomber in the clouds. On 23 November, several G.50s chased four Hurricanes but were unable to close on them. On 31 January 1941, there was another fruitless interception attempt when several G.50s were evaded by a Blenheim that escaped into the clouds.

At the beginning of 1941, the CAI returned to Italy, leaving behind the G.50s of 352ª, 353ª Squadriglie in Belgium, with Luftflotte 2 (Air Fleet 2) until April 1941. The G.50s flew 429 sorties, 34 escorts and 26 scrambles but failed to engage an aircraft. A G.50 was lost and seven more were damaged during the deployment. While operating with Luftflotte 2, 20° Gruppo lost four other fighters and two pilots were killed. A pair of G.50s were recorded as having been damaged by friendly fire from German fighters and flak.

In Belgium, 20° Gruppo had the opportunity to see the German Messerschmitt Bf 109 in action; several G.50 pilots trained to fly the type. A pair of Bf 109E pilots were attached to the Gruppo in mid-January 1941. On 8 April 1941, the last sighting of enemy aircraft by the G.50 occurred, during which the targets, identified as fighters, eluded them again.

=== Aeronautica della Libia ===
On 27 December 1940, the first 27 G.50s, of 150ª Squadriglia and 152ª Squadriglia of 2° Gruppo Autonomo CT, arrived in Libya to join Squadra 5. On 9 January 1941, the fighters flew their first operation in North Africa. Capitano Pilota (Flight Lieutenant) Tullio De Prato, commander of 150ª Squadriglia was attacked by a Hurricane, forcing him to crash-land his G.50 in the desert. On 31 January 1941, 155° Gruppo Autonomo CT, consisting of 351ª Squadriglia, 360ª Squadriglia and 378ª Squadriglia (Maggiore Luigi Bianchi) arrived in Libya. Caught up in the chaotic retreat of the 10th Army during the winter of 1940–1941, the G.50s saw relatively little action.

On 9 April 1941, Tenente Pilota Carlo Cugnasca (an experienced pilot and the first to deliver a G.50 to Finland) attacked a flight of three Hurricanes of 73 Squadron and claimed one shot down, although this loss was not confirmed. On his return, he was force-landed his G.50, flipping the aircraft over on the airstrip but was unharmed.

On 14 April when 66 Axis aircraft, including eight G.50s from 351ª Squadriglia, attacked British forces stationed near Tobruk. The Hurricanes of 73 Squadron were outnumbered, resulting in the Hurricanes, which were only marginally faster than the G.50, having to ignore the Axis fighters and concentrate their efforts on the Italian bombers, which posed the greatest threat. Flying their G.50s Cugnasca and Marinelli attacked H.G. Webster's Hurricane while he was shooting at a Stuka dive-bomber, shooting down and killing him over Tobruk. Flight Lieutenant James Duncan 'Smudger' Smith in P2652, saw the engagement, shot down and killed Cugnasca and Marinelli and damaged another G.50 before being shot down by the 351ª Squadriglia commander, Capitano Angelo Fanello.

On 27 May, the 20° Gruppo was reinforced by 151ª Squadriglia, which was equipped with the new Fiat G.50 bis. This new version had almost two hours of flight endurance, due to an extra fuel tank in the internal fuselage section (originally a bomb bay. The normal tactic with the G.50 was to dive from 1,500 m (4,900 ft) but they never flew very high over North Africa, usually keeping below 4,500 m (14,800 ft). The aircraft still lacked radio sets and despite air filters, the desert sand could reduce engine life to only 70–80 hours.

Although the G.50s were mainly outperformed by Desert Air Force fighters, their pilots sometimes managed to shoot down the faster and better-armed Hurricanes and P-40s. In the hands of expert pilots, the G.50 was even capable of scoring multiple kills during a single sortie. For instance, on the evening of 9 July 1941, Sergente Maggiore Aldo Buvoli of 378ª Squadriglia, 155° Gruppo Autonomo, took off from Castel Benito airfield to patrol Tripoli harbour and intercepted a flight of seven Blenheim light bombers, which had been engaged in a low-level attack on the ships. Two Fiat CR.42 biplanes from 151° Gruppo were already pursuing the Blenheims when Buvoli attacked, shooting at each bomber in sequence. One Blenheim ditched in the sea while another was shot down a few miles north of Tripoli. Two Blenheims failed to return to Luqa airfield in Malta and were posted missing. For these successes, Buvoli was awarded the Silver Medal of Military Valor and subsequently credited with four kills. 110 Squadron reported the loss of a similar number of Blenheim IVs on its first mission since arriving in Malta from the British mainland during early July.

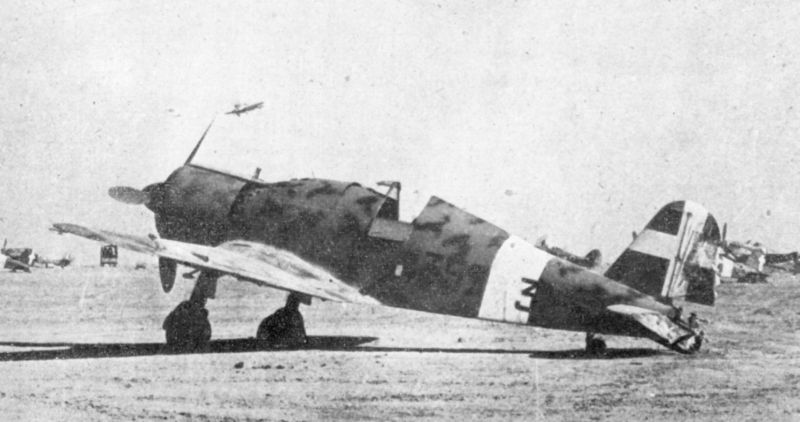
A Fiat G.50 captured by the British at Sidi Rezegh airfield in North Africa. An RAF Hawker Hurricane is landing (left) and another is in the background on the right.

During the Battle of Sidi Barrani, the first major British offensive of the Western Desert Campaign, a number of G.50s operating from Martuba Airbase, Derna District, attacked the British-held airfield at Sidi Barrani. On 18 November 1941, during Operation Crusader, the Desert Air Force was responsible for destroying 13 aircraft during the Battle of Gazala at the Ain el Gazala airfields, 10 of these being G.50s. On 19 November 20° Gruppo, based at Sid el Rezegh, suffered many losses when British armoured forces suddenly attacked the airfield. Of the 19 G.50s, only three escaped, with 80 pilots and ground crew taken prisoner. Altogether, 26 G.50s were lost and 20° Gruppo was left with only 36 G.50s, of which 27 were serviceable. Several G.50s were captured almost intact, and at least one was taken by 260 Squadron and later passed to 272 Squadron.

After 1941, the G.50 played only a minor role in the Regia Aeronautica. During June 1942, British intelligence estimated that 12 Gruppo had a total of 26 G.50s (10 of these being of a serviceable condition), while the backbone of 5a Squadra Aerea was estimated to have comprised a mixture of 104 C.202s, 63 C.200s, 32 Z.1007 and 31 S.79s.

=== Aeronautica dell'Albania ===
During the Greco-Italian War (28 October 1940 to 23 April 1941) the Freccia of 395ª Squadriglia, 160° Gruppo Autonomo CT commenced offensive operations from Berat against Greek and Allied forces over the Balkans and the Aegean Sea. From 1 to 5 November, the 24° Gruppo Autonomo CT with 354ª, 355ª and 361ª Squadriglie flew to Tirana to reinforce the Italian fighter force. By 5 April 1941 the 154° Gruppo Autonomo CT was operating from Devoli with two Squadriglie of Fiat G.50s. Early on 20 February 1941, a flight of Hurricane fighters were engaged in their first aerial combat over the Balkans when seven G.50s of 154 Gruppo were scrambled from Devoli to intercept a formation of RAF Blenheims with their Hurricane escorts but the Freccias did not engage. That afternoon, 15 G.50s engaged more Blenheims and Gladiator fighters, claiming ten aircraft for the loss of one G.50, the RAF claimed three G.50s, for no loss. Post war records showed the loss of one Blenheim and a G.50.

On 28 February 1941, RAF units intercepted Italian bombers and escorts, claiming 27 aircraft shot down and several others damaged in the ensuing battle. The Italians claimed six Gladiators and a Spitfire. The recorded losses were one Gladiator and eight Italian aircraft; many more were damaged. On 4 March 1941, a G.50 bis was responsible for the shooting down of Hurricane V7288, piloted by Australian ace Flight Lieutenant Nigel Cullen RAF (who was credited with 15 or 16 victories) off Valona on the Albanian coast, while he was flying as wing-man for Pat Pattle. During the Greek campaign, a flight of ten G.50 fighters were recorded as having been lost, including both combat losses and others that had been destroyed by a combination of accidents and as a consequence of Allied bombing of Italian airfields.

=== Sicilian and Italian campaigns ===
During the second half of the war, the G.50 was typically operated as a multi-role fighter and ground attack aircraft, equipped only with external bombs. During the opening phase of the Allied invasion of Sicily, the G.50 was the most numerous aircraft used by the Regia Aeronautica against the Allied landings.

Just prior to the start of the invasion, a specialised ground attack unit of the Regia Aeronautica, 50° Stormo Assalto, was transferred to southern Italy, with G.50 bis fighter-bombers. When the invasion began on 10 July 1943, additional units were rushed to the area. With other Italian and German ground attack units, 45 G.50 bis of 158° and 159° Gruppi Assalto from Pistoia attacked Allied shipping, landing craft and troops. Ten G.50 bis saw action on 11 July with several Re.2002s, escorted by five Re.2005s of 362a Squadriglia, when they were intercepted by an overwhelming fighter "umbrella". Three G.50s were shot down, including Tenente Colonnello (Wing Commander) Guido Nobili, commander of 5° Stormo Assalto. The remainder of the Italian aircraft returned to their base where the fighters were mostly destroyed on the ground by a follow-up air attack.

By the time of the Armistice of Cassibile with the Allies, 48 G.50s were left in Italy, 17 being serviceable. Several G.50s continued to be operated as part of the Aviazione Cobelligerante Italiana (ACI, Italian Co-Belligerent Air Force) while at least four G.50s were used by the Aeronautica Nazionale Repubblicana (National Republican Air Force) as fighter trainers.

=== Finnish service ===
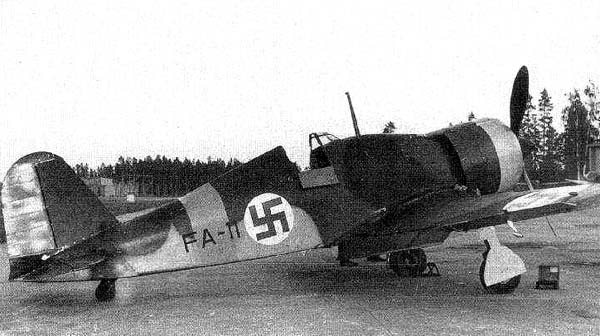
Fiat G.50 in Finnish markings, c. 1940

The G.50 saw its longest and most successful service in the two Finnish wars against the Soviet Union, the Winter War of 1939–1940 and the Continuation War of 1941–1944. At the end of 1939, before the outbreak of hostilities, Finland ordered 35 Fiat G.50s. The first 10 aircraft were to be delivered before February 1940 and a group of Finnish pilots attended a 10-hour training course at Guidonia airport and later at Fiat Aviazione in Turin. On a training flight, during a dive from 3,500 m (11,500 ft), Lieutenant Tapani Harmaja reached an estimated speed of 780 km/h (480 mph), which was considered excessive for the structural integrity of the aircraft but only the windscreen was damaged.

Germany hindered the transit of the aircraft, because of its treaties with the Soviet Union, that left Finland inside the Soviet sphere of influence. The G.50s were dismantled and embarked in La Spezia on the Norwegian ship Braga, which set sail for Turku, Finland, on 20 January. Deliveries took place from December 1939 to June 1940; because of this delay, the first G.50s did not reach [[No. 26 Squadron (Finland)|Lentolaivue 26]] (26 Squadron [LeLv 26]) at Utti until February 1940. The G.50s were given serial numbers from FA-1 to FA-35 but only 33 were delivered to Finland and sent to LeLv 26. A day before the truce after the Winter War, they had received 30 Fiat G.50s of the 35 ordered. On 7 February, Fiat G.50 (FA-7) was lost when being ferried to Finland by a Hungarian volunteer, Second Lieutenant Vilmos Békássy who crashed into the sea. On 11 March, Diego Manocchi was killed in FA-22 making an emergency landing on a frozen lake and turned over.

The Italian fighters had arrived too late to affect the course of the winter battles and most of them were soon sent to the front. The Fiat pilots fought over the bay of Vyborg in late February and early March. According to some sources, the first kill was achieved on 26 February. The Fiat bases were under constant attack. The Utti airfield was bombed by the Soviet air force. Consequently, the Fiats were transferred 2 km (1.2 mi) to the north-west of Utti proper, onto the ice at Haukkajärvi (Falcon Lake). As Haukkajärvi came under attack, another shore base was established near the city of Lahti, Hollola, also on the ice of Vesijärvi near Pyhäniemi manor. LeLv 26 achieved 11 kills, against one loss in combat and one pilot killed in an accident (the aircraft was repaired and returned to service in 1941).

The Finnish G.50y was taken from the 235 built by CMASA, both Serie I and Serie II but all but seven had the open cockpit of the Serie II, that Finnish pilots disliked, especially in winter. There were some attempts to improve the aircraft, one was tested with an enclosed cockpit, another with a D.XXI ski-undercarriage but none of the modifications were put into service. Better protection for the propeller, which had problems at extremely low temperatures, and a few other changes were introduced. Finnish pilots preferred the Hurricane, the French M.S. 406 and the Buffalo to the G.50.

==== Victories, February–March 1940 ====
Fiat G.50	FA-4	FA-5	FA-9	FA-13	FA-20	FA-21	Aaltonen	Linnamaa	Nieminen	Paronen	Puhakka
26-02-1940	I-16, I-152		DB-3					DB-3			I-16, I-152
28-02-1940	DB-3	DB-3		SB, SB			DB-3		SB, SB	DB-3
02-03-1940	I-153						I-153
09-03-1940					I-153				I-153
11-03-1940						DB-3

The first demonstration of the Finnish Air Force's effectiveness came on 25 June 1941, when the G.50s from HLeLv 26 shot down 13 out of 15 Soviet SB bombers. Thirteen aerial victories were achieved altogether.

During the Continuation War, the G.50s had most success during the Finnish offensive of 1941, after which they became ever less impressive. In 1941, HLeLv 26 claimed 52 victories for the loss of only two fighters. The Soviets brought better, newer types of fighter to the front line in 1942 and 1943, while the Fiats were wearing out and the lack of spare parts meant that pilots were restricted to a minimal number of sorties. Between 30 November 1939 and 4 September 1944, the G.50s of HLeLv 26 shot down 99 enemy aircraft, including more modern aircraft like the British fighters sent to the USSR. In the same period, Finnish squadrons lost 41 aircraft of several types. Three G.50s were lost in combat, a victory−loss ratio of 33/1.

The most successful Finnish G.50 pilots were Oiva Tuominen (23 victories), Olli Puhakka 11 (or 13 according to other sources) Nils Trontti (6), Onni Paronen (4), Unto Nieminen (4) and Lasse Lautamäki (4). The Finnish G.50s were withdrawn from front-line duty in the summer of 1944. There were no more than 10 or 12, and even as trainers, they did not last long, since they lacked spare parts. Unlike the slightly older MS.406, there was no effort to change their engine to make them better and faster. The last G.50 was struck off the inventory on 13 December 1946, at the FAF flight academy in Kauhava.

=== Croatian service ===
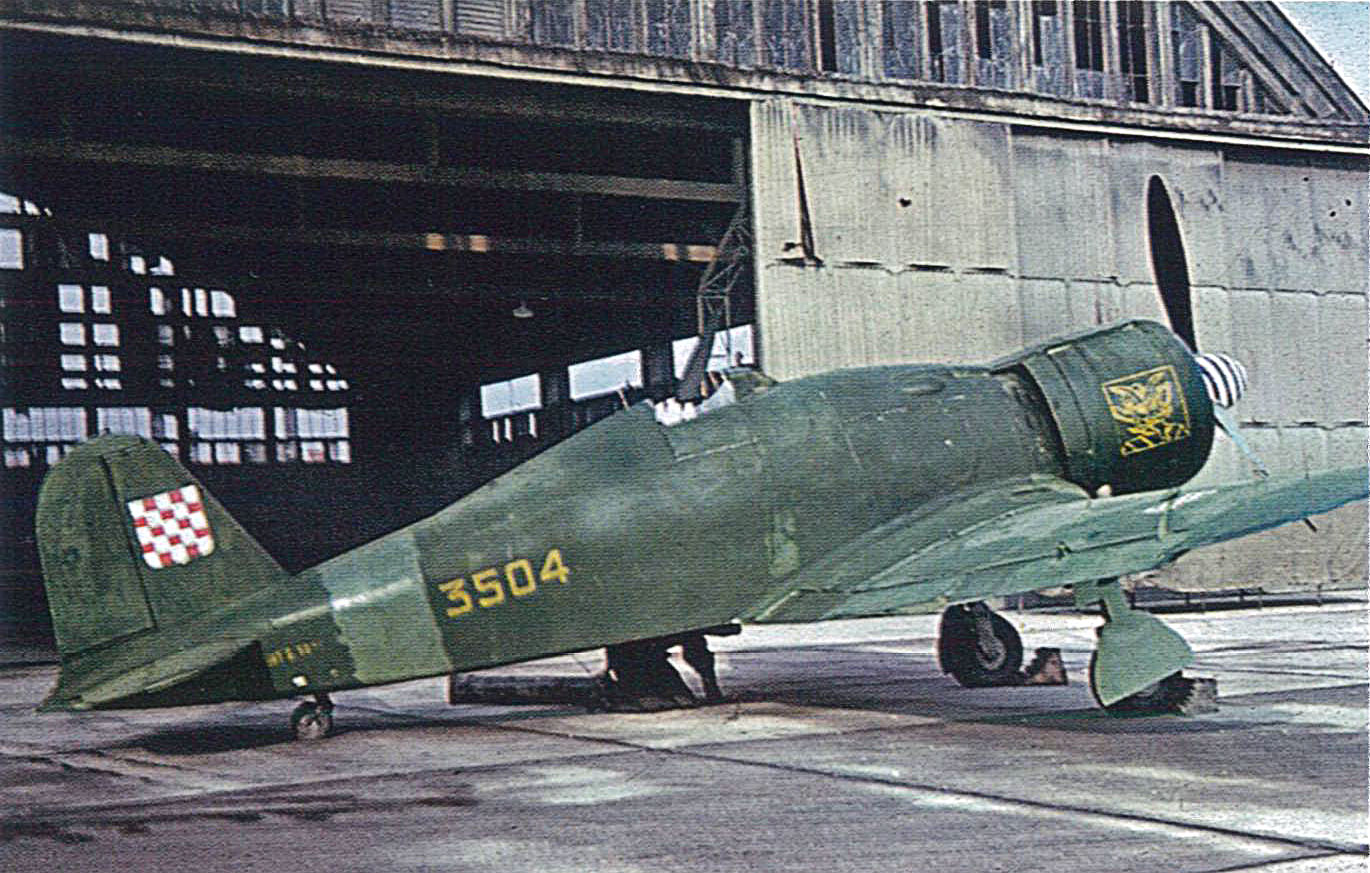
A Croatian Ustashe Fiat G.50 in 1944

In October 1941, the Croatian Air Force Legion requested military aid from Italy and the Italians agreed to deliver ten Fiat G.50s (nine single-seaters and one two-seater), along with ancillary equipment. On 12 June 1942, the Fiat G.50 bis fighters took off from Fiat Aviazione in Turin for Croatia but before they reached the border, they were stopped on the orders of Ugo Cavallero, Chief of Comando Supremo (Italian High Command) who feared that the Croatian pilots would defect. The G.50s had to wait until 25 June before being delivered to the Croatian Air Force, which assigned them to the 16th Jato (squadron) at Banja Luka. The Fiats were intensively used until 1945 against Yugoslav Partisans, at first in Bosnia and Herzegovina, then in Serbia, Croatia and Dalmatia. During 1942, a Croatian G.50 bis squadron was transferred from Northern Yugoslavia to the Ukrainian front, flanking Luftflotte 4.

On 25 June 1943, the Zrakoplovstvo Nezavisne Drzave Hrvatske (Air Force of the Independent State of Croatia, ZNDH), received nine G.50 bis fighters and one G.50B. In October, while based at Zalužani airfield, Banja Luka, they flew many strafing missions against partisans for nearly a year. After the Italian armistice of 8 September 1943, the Luftwaffe supplied the ZNDH with 20–25 Fiat G.50s captured on Regia Aeronautica airfields in the Balkans. These equipped two Croatian fighter units but by the end of 1943 only 10 aircraft remained. Three G.50s captured after the Armistice were loaned to Kroatische Jagdgruppe 1 (Croatian fighter Wing 1, Kro JGr 1) at the beginning of 1944. In 1944 some of the G.50s were operated at the Brežice training school. In January 1945 ZNDH had seven Fiat G.50s but only two were operational. On 10 March 1945, six of the Fiats were based in Lucko, operated by 2.LJ (Lovacka Grupa, Fighter Group). Three were damaged by RAF Mustangs of 213 Squadron and 249 Squadron attacking Lucko airfield with napalm bombs, on 25 March, and the following day one of the last serviceable Freccia was flown to a RAF-held airfield by Yodnik (Corporal) Ivan Misulin that defected, together with vodnik Korhut (flying a Bf 109 G-10). The last G.50s were captured by Yugoslav Partisans. After the war, the G.50s were used for some time by the new Yugoslav Air Force, the last G.50s on active service.

== Variants ==
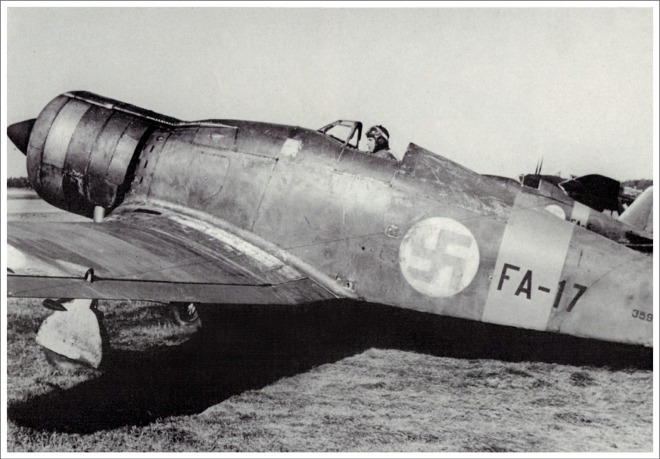
FIAT G.50 II Series

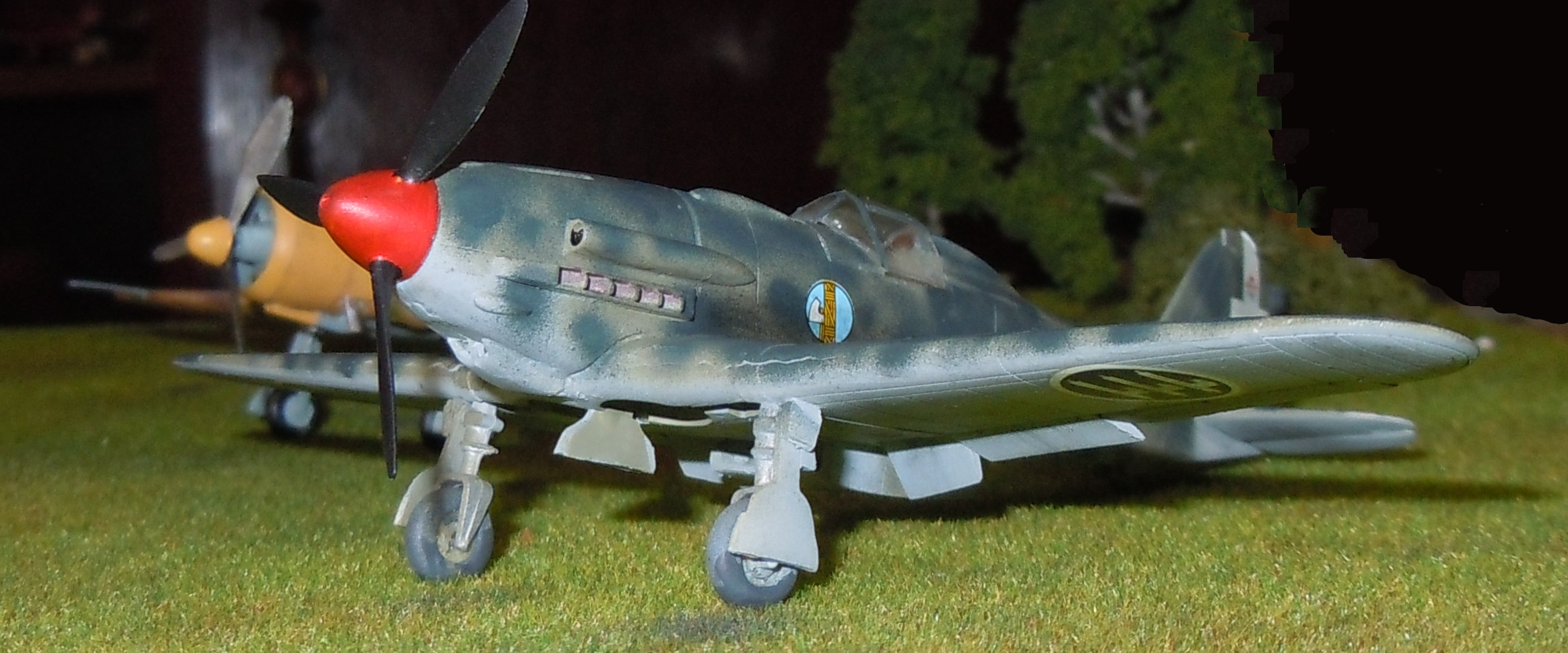
Model of the Fiat G.50V

G.50
First production version.
G.50 bis
Development of the G.50 version with extended range; 421 built.
G.50 bis/A
Two seat carrier fighter modified from a G.50B; one modified.
G.50 ter
More powerful version with a 746 kW (1,000 hp) Fiat A.76 engine; one built.
G.50V
Liquid-cooled V12 variant with a Daimler-Benz DB 601 engine; one built.
G.50 bis A/N
Two-seat fighter-bomber prototype; one built.
G.50B
Two-seat trainer version. 100 aircraft built.
G.51
Projected production version of the G.50V, abandoned in favour of the Fiat G.55. One prototype made.
G.52
Projected version of the G.50, powered by a Fiat A.75 R.C.53 engine. The engine never materialised and the G.52 was never built.

== Operators ==
Croatia

- Croatian Air Force received 15+ aircraft.

Finland

- Finnish Air Force received 33 aircraft (FA-1 to FA-6 and FA-9 to FA-35) of the 35 ordered. FA-7 and FA-8 were destroyed in accidents before they arrived in Finland; they crossed the Gulf of Bothnia in the spring of 1940.
  - No. 26 Squadron, Finnish Air Force

Germany

- Luftwaffe

Kingdom of Italy

- Regia Aeronautica
- Gruppo Sperimentale da Caccia, Spanish Civil War from January 1939 to March 1939, the 12 Fiat G.50 fighters were transferred to the Spanish Air Force.
- 351ª Squadriglia
- 352ª Squadriglia
- 353ª Squadriglia
- 354ª Squadriglia
- 355ª Squadriglia
- 357ª Squadriglia
- 358ª Squadriglia
- 359ª Squadriglia
- 360ª Squadriglia
- 361ª Squadriglia
- Aviazione Legionaria 12 aircraft
- Italian Co-Belligerent Air Force

Italian Social Republic

- Aeronautica Nazionale Repubblicana

Spain

- Ejército del Aire

Yugoslavia

- SFR Yugoslav Air Force one ex-Croatian Fiat G.50

== Surviving aircraft ==
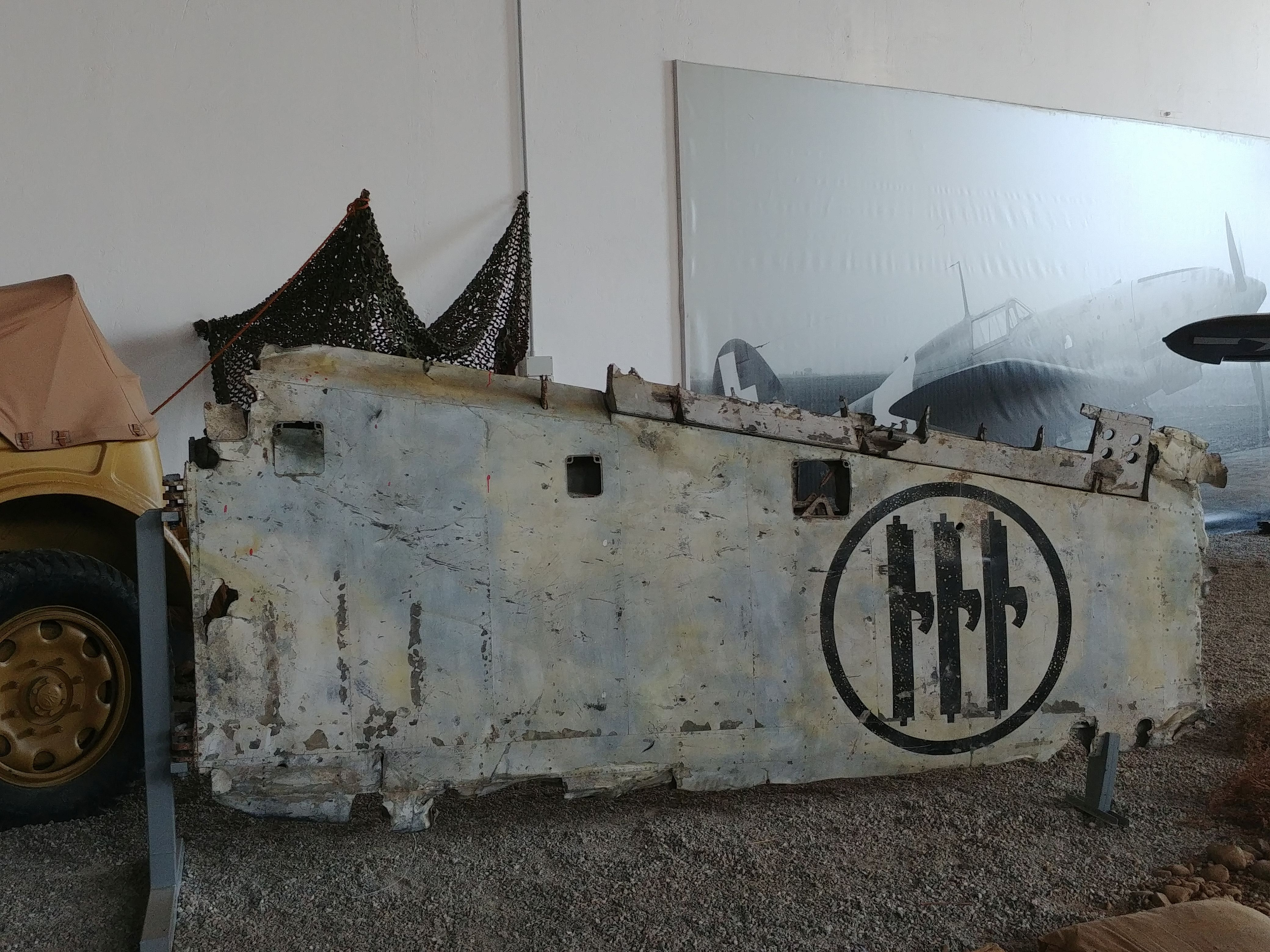
An un-restored G.50 wing panel on display in Italy.

In September 2010, the only known G.50 bis still in existence was undergoing restoration in the Museum of Aviation, in Surčin, at Nikola Tesla Airport, Serbia.

== Specifications (G.50) ==
Data from A Second String Arrow...The Fiat G.50

General characteristics

- Crew: 1
- Length: 8.01 m (26 ft 3 in)
- Wingspan: 10.99 m (36 ft 1 in)
- Height: 3.28 m (10 ft 9 in)
- Wing area: 18.25 m^{2} (196.4 sq ft)
- Empty weight: 1,963 kg (4,328 lb)
- Max takeoff weight: 2,402 kg (5,296 lb)
- Powerplant: 1 × Fiat A.74 R.C.38 14-cylinder air-cooled radial piston engine, 649 kW (870 hp) for take-off and 720 kW (970 hp) at 3,800 m (12,500 ft)
- Propellers: 3-bladed Hamilton Standard-Fiat constant-speed propeller

Performance

- Maximum speed: 470 km/h (290 mph, 250 kn) at 5,000 m (16,000 ft)
- Range: 445 km (277 mi, 240 nmi)
- Service ceiling: 10,700 m (35,100 ft)
- Time to altitude: 5,000 m (16,000 ft) in 6 minutes 3 seconds
- Wing loading: 131 kg/m^{2} (27 lb/sq ft)

Armament

- Guns: 2 × 12.7 mm (0.50 in) Breda-SAFAT machine guns

== See also ==
Related development

- Fiat G.55

Aircraft of comparable role, configuration, and era

- Bloch MB.150
- Curtiss P-36 Hawk
- IAR 80
- Koolhoven F.K.58
- Macchi C.200
- Nakajima Ki-43
- Polikarpov I-16
- Reggiane Re.2000
- Seversky P-35
- Weiss Manfréd WM-23 Ezüst Nyíl

Related lists

- List of aircraft of World War II
- List of aircraft of Italy in World War II

== Bibliography ==
- "A Second String Arrow – Part 1". Air International. Vol. 34, no. 5. Bromley: Fine Scroll. May 1988. pp. 251–258. ISSN 0306-5634.
- Arena, Nino (1996). Aviazione – I caccia a motore radiale. La generazione intermedia Macchi MC.200 Fiat CR.42 Reggiane RE 2000 Fiat G.50 (Le macchine e la storia) [Radial Engine Fighters: The intermediate generation, Macchi MC.200, Fiat CR.42, Reggiane RE.2000, Fiat G.50 (The machines and the history)] (in Italian). Modena: Mucchi Editore. ISBN 978-8-87-000024-5.
- Avions Militaires 1919–1939 – Profils et Histoire [Military Aircraft 1919–1939 – Profiles and History]. Connaissance de l'histoire Hachette. Hors-série, 2 (in French). Paris: Hachette. 1979. OCLC 941642325.
- Cattaneo, Gianni (1967). "The Fiat G.50". Aircraft in Profile. No. 188. Leatherhead, Surrey: Profile Publications Ltd. OCLC 43484783.
- Dunning, C. (1998). Courage Alone: The Italian Air Force 1940–1943. Aldershot: Hikoki. ISBN 1-902109-02-3.
- Ethell, Jeffrey L. (1995). Aircraft of World War II. Glasgow: HarperCollins/Jane's. ISBN 0-00-470849-0.
- Gunston, Bill (1988). Fighting Aircraft of World War II. London: Salamander Books. ISBN 1-84065-092-3.
- Gunston, Bill (1984). Gli Aerei della 2° Guerra Mondiale [World War II Aircraft]. Grande Enciclopedia delle Armi Moderne (in Italian). Alberto Peruzzo Editore. OCLC 797533857.
- Keskinen, Kalevi; Stenman, Kari; Niska, Klaus (1977). Fiat G.50. Suomen Ilmavoimien Historia (History of the Finnish Air Force (in Finnish). Vol. 8. Espoo, Finland: Tietoteos. ISBN 978-9-51-903526-0.
- Keskinen, Kalevi; Stenman, Kari (2004). Suomen ilmavoimien historia / 8. Fiat G.50, Caudron-Renault C.R. 714 [History of the Finnish Air Force / 8. Fiat G.50, Caudron-Renault C.R. 714]. Espoo: Kustannusliike Kari Stenman. ISBN 978-9-52-994320-3.
- Lembo, Daniele. "G.50 nella Guerra d'Inverno" [G.50 in the Winter War]. Aerei nella Storia. Parma: Delta Editions. ISSN 1591-1071.
- Locatelli, Daniele (January 1998). "Sidi el Barrani, 14 luglio 1941". Storia Militare. Parma: Albertelli editions.
- Maier, Klaus; Rohde, Horst; Stegemann, Bernd; Umbreit, Hans (2015) [1991]. Falla, P. S. (ed.). Germany's Initial Conquests in Europe. Germany and the Second World War. Translated by McMurry, Dean S.; Osers, Ewald (pbk. repr. Clarendon Press, Oxford ed.). Freiburg im Breisgau, Germany: Militärgeschichtliches Forchungsamt. ISBN 978-0-19-873834-3.
  - Rohde, Horst. "Part III Hitler's First Blitzkrieg and its Consequences for North-Eastern Europe V Development of the Situation in North-Eastern Europe: Effects of the Hitler–Stalin Pact". In Maier et al. (2015).
- Malizia, Nicola (2005). Fiat G-50. Aviolibri Records (in Italian). Roma-Nomentano, Italy: Istituto Bibliografico Napoleone. ISBN 88-7565-002-0.
- Malizia, Nicola (2008). Ali sulla steppa. La Regia Aeronautica nella campagna di Russia [Wings over the Steppe. The Royal Air Force in the Russian campaign] (in Italian). Rome: IBN Editore. ISBN 88-7565-049-7.
- Massimello, Giovanni; Apostolo, Giorgio (2000). Italian Aces of World War Two. Oxford/New York: Osprey Publishing. ISBN 978-1-84176-078-0.
- Mattioli, Marco (January 2000). "Il G.50 nella Guerra d'Inverno" [The G.50 in the Winter War]. Aerei nella Storia (in Italian). Parma. ISSN 1591-1071.
- Munson, Kenneth (1960). Enemy Aircraft (German and Italian) of World War II. London: Ian Allan. OCLC 475340463.
- Neulen, Hans Werner (2000) [1998]. In the Skies of Europe: Air Forces Allied to the Luftwaffe 1939–1945 (Eng. trans. ed.). Ramsbury, Marlborough: The Crowood Press. ISBN 978-1-86-126326-1.
- Neulen, Hans Werner (2005) [2000]. In the Skies of Europe: Air Forces Allied to the Luftwaffe 1939–1945. Translated by Vanags-Baginskis, Alex (pbk. repr. ed.). Ramsbury, Marlborough: The Crowood Press. ISBN 1-86-126799-1.
- Richards, Denis (1974) [1953]. Royal Air Force 1939–45: The Fight at Odds. Vol. I (2nd pbk. ed.). London: HMSO. ISBN 0-11-771592-1.
- Rocca, Gianni (1991). I disperati [The Desperate: The Tragedy of the Italian Air Force in the Second World War] (in Italian). Milan: Arnoldo Mondadori Editore. ISBN 978-8-86-944075-5.
- Santoni, Alberto (July 2007). "L'Ultra vola in alto" [The Ultra Flies High]. Storia Militare (in Italian). No. 166. Parma: Albertelli Editions.
- Savic, D.; Ciglic, B. (2002). Croatian Aces of World War II. Osprey Aircraft of the Aces 49. Oxford: Oxford. ISBN 1-84176-435-3.
- Sgarlato, Nico (2004). "Fiat G.50/55". I Grandi Aerei Storici (in Italian) (11). Parma: Delta Editions. ISBN 1-72-006300-1.
- Shores, Christopher; Cull, Brian; Malizia, Nicola (1987). Air War for Yugoslavia, Greece and Crete, 1940–41. London: Grub Street. ISBN 978-0-94-881707-6.
- Shores, Christopher (1977). Ground Attack Aircraft of World War II. London: Macdonald and Jane's. ISBN 0-356-08338-1.
- Shores, Christopher (1983). Air Aces. Greenwich, CT: Bison Books. ISBN 0-86124-104-5.
- Shores, Christopher; Massimello, Giovanni; Guest, Russell (2012). A History of the Mediterranean Air War 1940–1945: North Africa June 1940 – January 1942. Vol. I. London: Grub Street. ISBN 978-1-90-811707-6.
- Stenman, Kari (2013). Fiat.laivue – Lentolaivue 26 sodassa [The Fiat Squadron – 26 Squadron at War]. Helsinki: Kari Stenman Publishing. ISBN 978-952-99743-8-2.
- Thompson, Jonathan W. (1963). Italian Civil and Military Aircraft 1930–1945. Los Angeles: Aero Publishers Inc. LCCN 63-17621. OCLC 1303701.
- Vergnano, Piero (1997). Apostolo, Giorgio (ed.). Fiat G.50. Ali D'Italia. Torino: La Bancarella Aeronautica. OCLC 824454768.
