= Fiat BGA =

1930s Italian bomber aircraft prototype

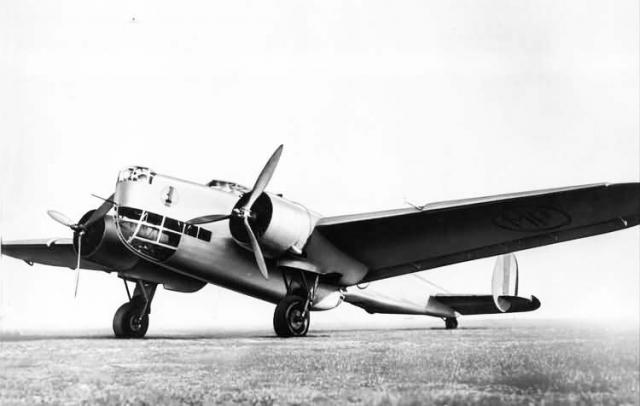

General information
- Type: Twin-engine medium bomber
- National origin: Italy
- Manufacturer: Fiat
- Designer: Aldo Guglielmetti
- Number built: 1

History
- First flight: 1936

The Fiat BGA (Bombardiere di Grande Autonomia) was an aircraft designed by Aldo Guglielmetti of the Italian Air Force.

It was built at Pisa by the Fiat subsidiary Costruzioni Meccaniche Aeronautiche SA (CMASA), hence it was also called the CMASA BGA. It was not ordered into production, and only one was built.

== Development ==
The BGA was designed by Aldo Guglielmetti to meet a 1934 Italian Air Force requirement for a medium bomber. It first flew in 1936, powered by two Fiat A.80 radial engines. It had a retractable tailwheel landing gear, with the main gear retracting into the engine nacelles. It had twin elliptical fins and rudders, and had a cut-down fuselage to the rear of its ventral and dorsal gun positions.

It did not perform well during testing, was removed from the contest, and only the prototype was produced.

== Specifications ==
Data from

General characteristics

- Length: 15.73 m (51 ft 7 in)
- Wingspan: 21.46 m (70 ft 5 in)
- Height: 4.85 m (15 ft 11 in)
- Wing area: 126.5 m^{2} (1,362 sq ft)
- Empty weight: 6,100 kg (13,448 lb) empty equipped
- Max takeoff weight: 9,080 kg (20,018 lb)
- Powerplant: 2 × Fiat A.80 R.C.41 18-cylinder air-cooled radial piston engines, 750 kW (1,000 hp) each

Performance

- Maximum speed: 405 km/h (252 mph, 219 kn)
- Range: 2,000 km (1,200 mi, 1,100 nmi)
- Service ceiling: 8,500 m (27,900 ft)

Armament

- Guns: three 7.7mm (0.303 in) machine-guns
- Bombs: 1000 kg in fuselage bay

== See also ==
Aircraft of comparable role, configuration, and era

- Handley Page Hampden

Related lists

- List of aircraft of World War II
- List of bomber aircraft
