= Aeritalia G.222 =

1970 airlifter family by Aeritalia

G.222 C-27A Spartan
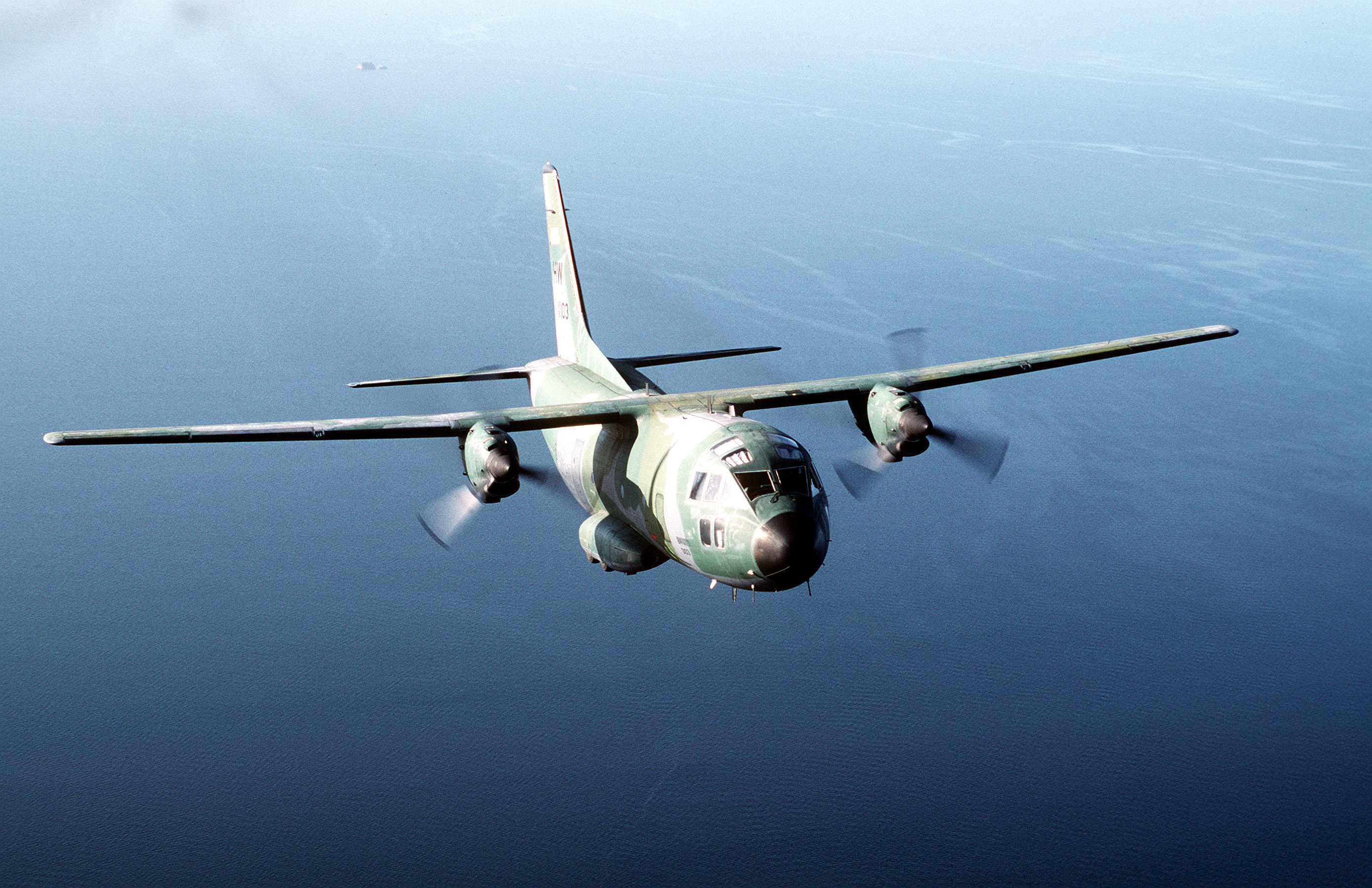
- A US Air Force C-27A Spartan out of Howard AFB, Panama

General information
- Type: Military transport aircraft
- Manufacturer: Fiat / Aeritalia / Alenia Aeronautica
- Status: Retired
- Primary users: Italian Air Force (historical) Nigerian Air Force; Argentine Army Aviation (historical)
- Number built: 111

History
- Manufactured: 1970–1993
- Introduction date: April 1978
- First flight: 18 July 1970
- Retired: 2012 (Afghan Air Force)
- Developed into: Alenia C-27J Spartan

The Aeritalia G.222 (formerly Fiat Aviazione, later Alenia Aeronautica) is a medium-sized STOL military transport aircraft.

It was developed to meet a NATO Basic Military Requirement 4; accordingly, it was originally designed with lift engines for a V/STOL capability, but these were never fitted to production aircraft. No wider NATO production contact were emerged, but Italy was keen to support its homegrown transport aircraft and issued an order for it in a more conventional configuration. Following its introduction to Italian Air Force service in April 1978, the type soon proved itself to be capable for conducting operations from compact and austere airstrips, particularly humanitarian missions.

Various export customers emerged for the type during the 1980s and 1990s. Libyan efforts to purchase 20 G.222s were initially vetoed by United States; Libya later procured a version of the aircraft without US-made equipment present instead. The United States purchased 10 G.222s in the 1990s, designating the type C-27A Spartan. During the 2000s, as the Italian Air Force withdrew their original G.222s due to their advancing age, these aircraft were commonly refurbished and subsequently sold onto other nations; via this approach, several G.222s were dispatched to Afghanistan during the War in Afghanistan.

A modernised variant, the Alenia C-27J Spartan, has been developed during the early 21st century. While it retains many aspects of the original aircraft, the C-27J adopts the same engines and many of the systems used on the larger Lockheed Martin C-130J Super Hercules. Several G.222 operators, including the Italian Air Force, have opted to retire their fleets in favour of new-built C-27Js.

== Development ==
=== Origins ===
In 1962, NATO issued a specification for a V/STOL transport aircraft (NATO Basic Military Requirement 4), capable of supporting dispersed V/STOL fighters. Fiat's design team, led by Giuseppe Gabrielli, produced a design to meet this requirement, designated G.222; it was to be powered by two Rolls-Royce Dart turboprop engines and with six to eight Rolls-Royce RB162 lift engines to give VTOL capability. According to Aeritalia, the G.222 designation is derived from the first letter of the aircraft's chief designer; the first '2' referring to the twin-engine arrangement, and the final '22' referring to the revised NATO Basic Military Requirement 22 to which it had been submitted.

None of the submissions resulted in a production contract; however the Italian Air Force (AMI), who was at the time seeking a replacement for the Fairchild C-119 Flying Boxcar, felt that the Fiat Aviazione proposal had merit, and placed an order for two prototypes and a ground-test airframe in 1968. The G.222 was substantially redeveloped from the NATO submission, the V/STOL lift engines having been omitted completely and the conventional Dart engines replaced by a pair of General Electric T64s; the twin-boom tail featured on the V/STOL concept was also eliminated and replaced by a more conventional single tail configuration; subsequently the new aircraft had no V/STOL capability but retained considerable short take-off/landing (STOL) performance.

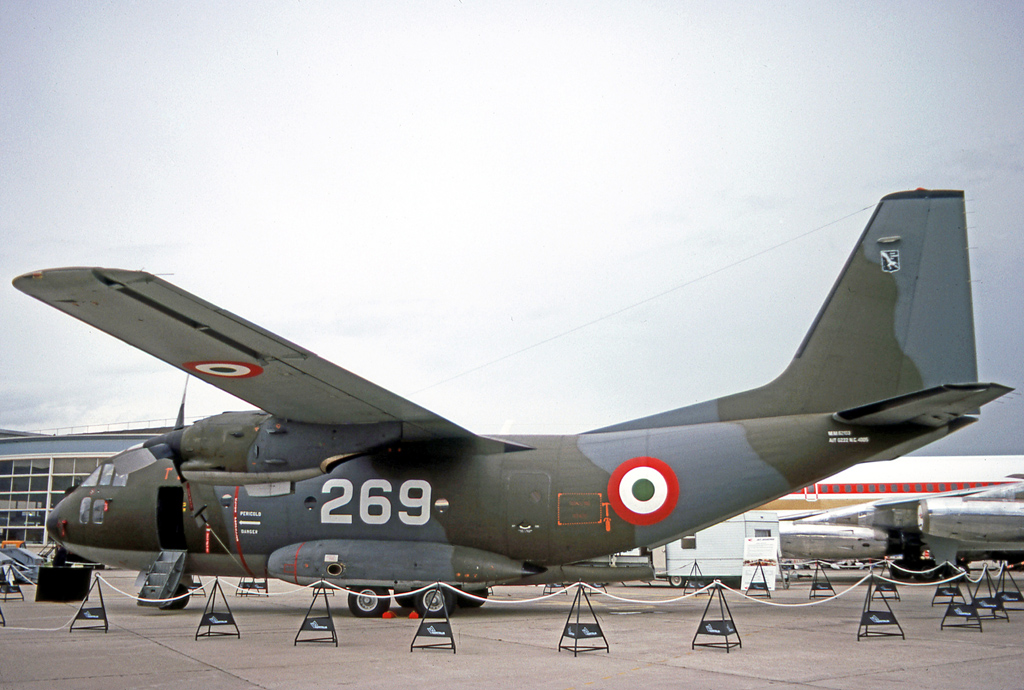
Fiat G.222TCM development aircraft exhibited at the 1977 Paris Air Show.

On 18 July 1970, the first prototype performed the aircraft's maiden flight with test pilot Vittorio Sanseverino at the controls. By late April 1971, the prototype had reportedly conducted a total of 22 flights and accumulated 50 hours of flight time, during which its performance was claimed to have been highly close to predictions. In December 1971, the Italian Air Force, who had placed a provisional order for the developing type, formally began evaluating the G.222 and the performance of the two prototypes then in service. Following a successful testing period, the AMI contract for 44 aircraft was issued to Aeritalia (of which Fiat Aviazione had since become a part). In December 1975, the first production aircraft conducted its first flight. In April 1978, this same aircraft formally entered service with the AMI. Following on from its introduction by the AMI, the G.222 was procured as a tactical transport aircraft by various international customers, including Argentina, Nigeria, Somalia, Venezuela and Thailand.

In December 1978, Aeritalia elected to transfer final assembly of the G.222 from Turin to Naples, at which point a total of 44 firm orders had been obtained for the type and one aircraft per month was being manufactured. Manufacturing of the G.222 was broken down into various companies; construction of the fuselage was performed at Naples, the center-section of the wing was produced by Piaggio, the wing panels were made by Macchi, the tail surfaces were built by SIAI-Marchetti, the engine nacelles by IAM, and the T64 engines were license-manufactured by Alfa Romeo and Fiat.

=== Further development ===
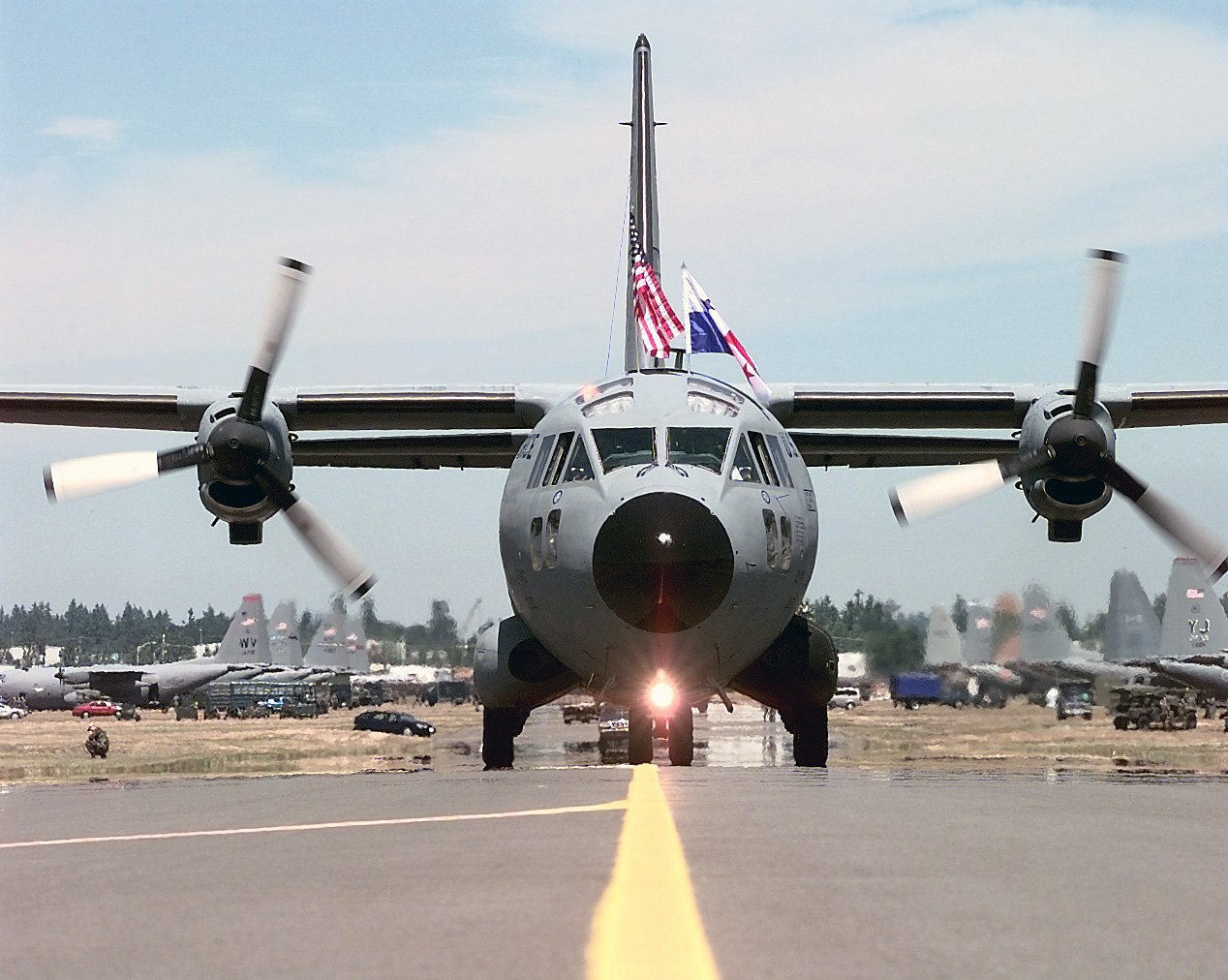
A C-27A taxiing at McChord AFB, Washington, 1998

In 1977, Libya sought the purchase of 20 G.222s; this was vetoed by the U.S. Government, who had imposed an embargo on military arms and equipment to Libya, which included the G.222's T64 engines. To get around this restriction, Aeritalia developed a version of the G.222 powered by the Rolls-Royce Tyne engine and other US supplied equipment was replaced by European equivalents; the more powerful Tyne engine also reportedly gave this variant superior "hot and high" performance. The provision of alternative powerplants was viewed by Aeritalia as a measure to widen the overall appeal of the G.222; the Tyne engine also reportedly possessed greater growth potential than the T64 engine. In May 1980, the first G.222 equipped with the Tyne engine performed its maiden flight. Libya placed an order for 20 Tyne-powered aircraft instead, with deliveries commencing from 1980.

In order to extend the effective operational lifespan of the type, some operators have carried out extensive upgrade programs of the G.222. In the aftermath of Italian humanitarian missions in Bosnia and Somalia, in 1996 the AMI began undertaking a major update program on their G.222 fleet; modifications include cockpit lighting changes for compatibility with Night Vision Goggles to enable night operations, increasing the aircraft's self-defense capabilities, new communications and navigation systems, and the removal of obsolete equipment. In July 2005, the Nigerian Air Force signed a $74.5 million contract with Alenia Aeronautica for the refurbishment of a total of five G.222s, as well as the purchase of a retired AMI G.222.

In 1990, the United States Air Force selected the G.222 as the basis of a "Rapid-Response Intra-Theater Airlifter" (RRITA). Operated under the designation C-27A Spartan, ten G.222s were purchased and underwent avionics upgrades by Chrysler Aerospace. These aircraft were stationed at Howard AFB, Panama. The USAF would later dispose of their C-27A fleet, partly due to shifting priorities between the Army and the Air Force and partly because of the impending introduction of a newer variant, the Alenia C-27J Spartan.

== Design ==
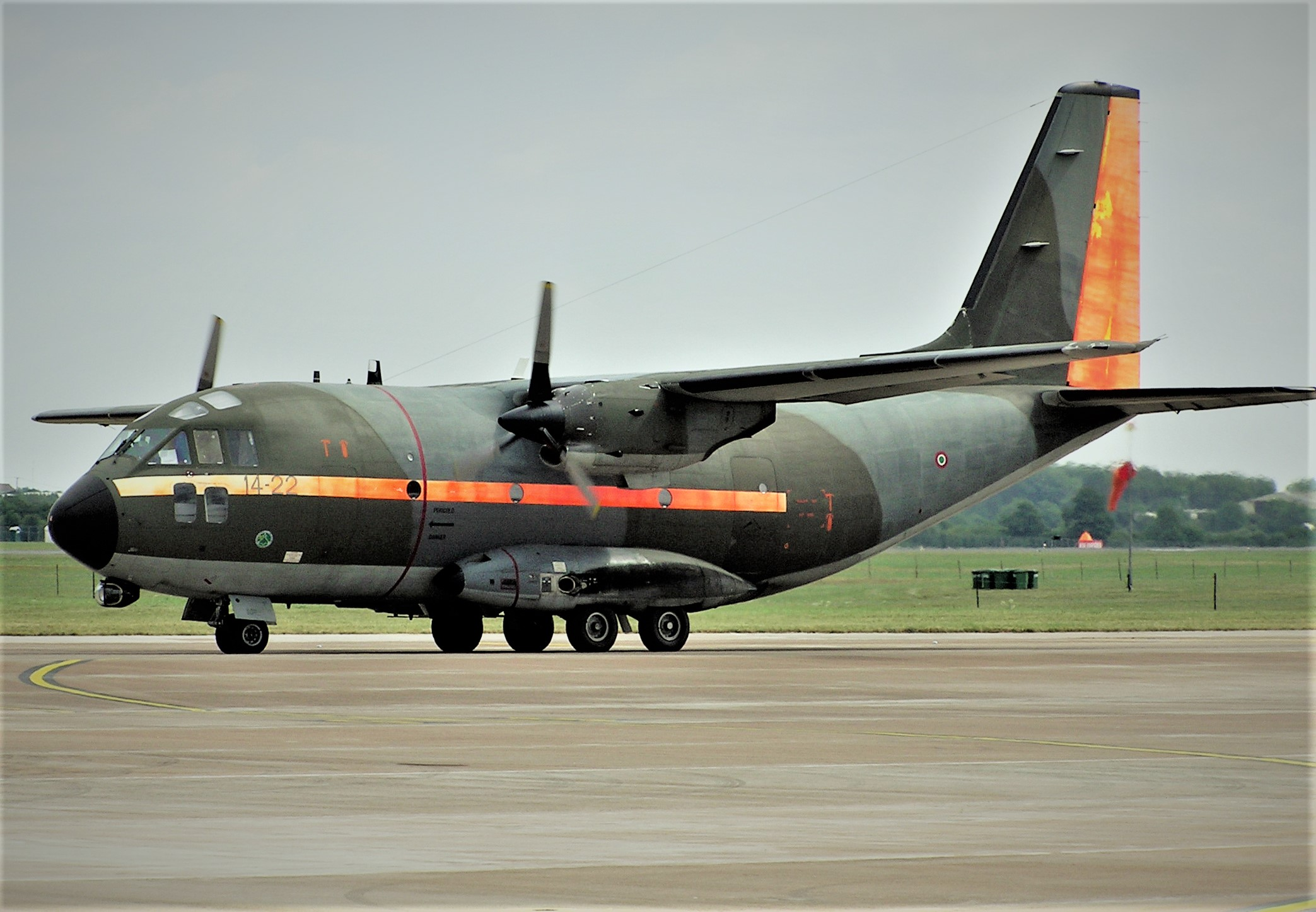
Italian Air Force Alenia G.222RM radio and radar calibration aircraft, 2005

The G.222 is a twin turboprop-engine tactical military transport aircraft, and is designed to be capable of transporting equipment or troops in combat zones and operating with minimal ground support. Early production aircraft were exclusively fitted with the General Electric T64-GE-P4D turboprop engine, the licence-built Rolls-Royce Tyne was made available as an alternative powerplant for the type from 1980 onwards, while the Allison T56 was another proposed powerplant for the type. Due to features such as double-slotted flaps, stacked brakes, and reversible propellers, the G.222 has excellent short landing capabilities and is able to land in as little as 1,800 feet. It was designed to be integrated with the larger, commonplace Lockheed C-130 Hercules.

The G.222's cargo deck can carry up to 9,000 kg (19,840 lb) of cargo, or alternatively up to 53 troops, or 32 paratroopers, or a maximum of 36 stretchers with six attending medics in a medevac capacity. The cargo deck has a large rear ramp, allowing the loading of palletised goods and vehicles, as well as sliding doors on either side of the fuselage, which are capable of being used to deploy paratroopers. Various pallet-based special mission equipment could be readily installed to enhance the aircraft's capabilities for diverse roles such as VIP transport, maritime patrol, aerial firefighting, and calibration functions; this equipment could also be removed quickly in order for aircraft to be returned to conventional transport missions. To easily facilitate the loading of a wide range of cargos, the height of the landing gear can be manually controlled.

In part due to the austere maintenance requirements of the G.222 and its capability of operating from short unprepared airstrips in remote regions, it has seen heavy use for performing various humanitarian missions across Africa, East Asia, Europe and Central America.

The cockpit provides excellent external visibility for pilots, most of the key controls are centrally placed between the two pilots, enabling the aircraft to be flown by a single pilot under certain circumstances. The standard G.222 is equipped with various avionics, such as a nose-mounted Doppler radar, navigational computers, radio systems, and a Rockwell Collins-built autopilot. Electronic receiver equipment and up to ten control consoles were installed upon a number of G.222s for performing electronic reconnaissance missions. Some aircraft were fitted with aerial refuelling probes and associated equipment. Some Italian G.222s have been equipped with a self-protection suite, which uses multiple forms of sensors to warn against identified threats, this suite also includes several countermeasures such as chaff and flare dispensers.

== Operational history ==
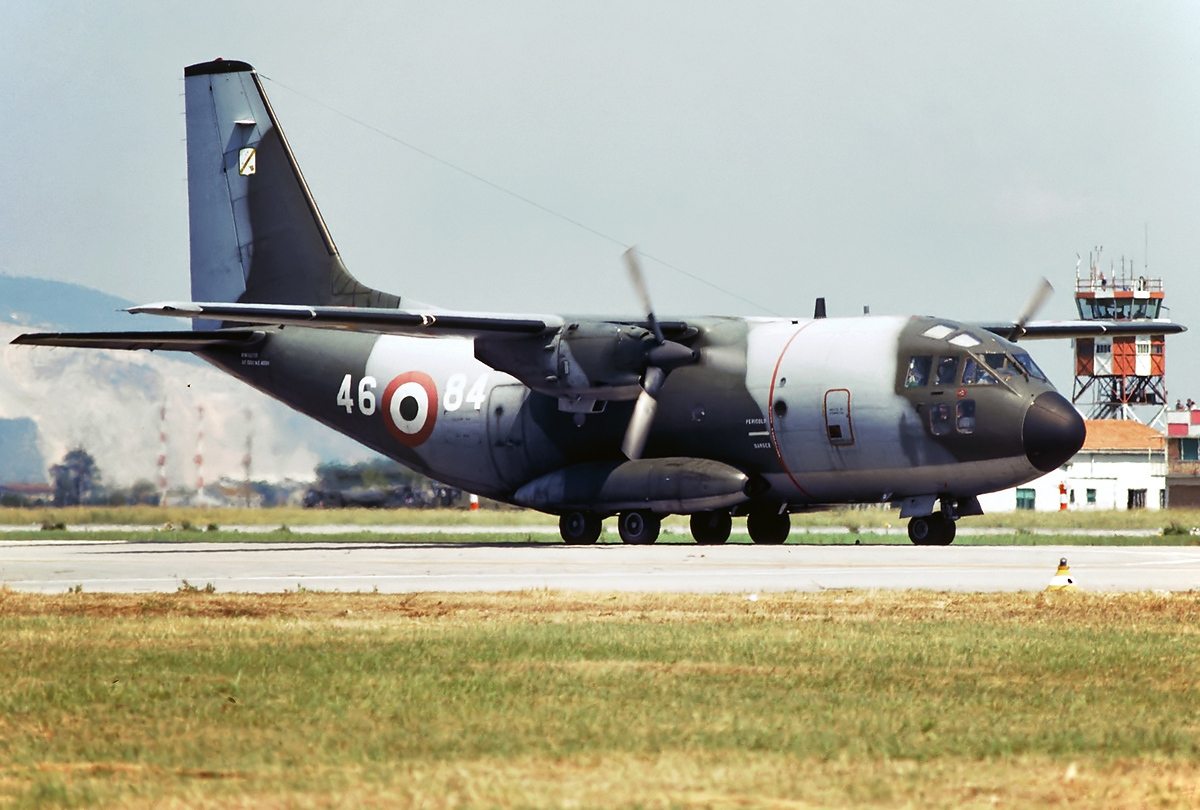
Alenia G.222 at Pisa International Airport, 1981

In 1978, the 98th Group of the 46th Transport Air Wing became the first squadron of the Italian Air Force to receive the G.222. The type was promptly placed into a support capacity, not only to the Italian Air force but also for humanitarian and civil protection.

The G.222 has seen considerable service in air relief and military supply operations. From 1979 onwards, Italy, along with other Western nations, provided considerable military aid to Somalia, part of the Italian contribution was four G.222s. In 1982, three Ejército Argentino G.222s were operational during the Falklands War, and may have participated in a logistical capacity. In 1983, a single Italian Air Force G.222 was outfitted for fire suppression duties, alongside an existing C-130 in the same role.

On 3 September 1992, an Italian Air Force (Aeronautica Militare Italiana) G.222 was shot down when approaching Sarajevo airfield while conducting a United Nations relief mission. It crashed 18 miles (29 km) from the airfield; a NATO rescue mission was aborted when 2 USMC CH-53 helicopters came under small arms fire. The cause of the crash was determined to be a surface-to-air missile, but it was not clear who shot it. Everyone on board – four Italian crew members and four French passengers – died in the crash.

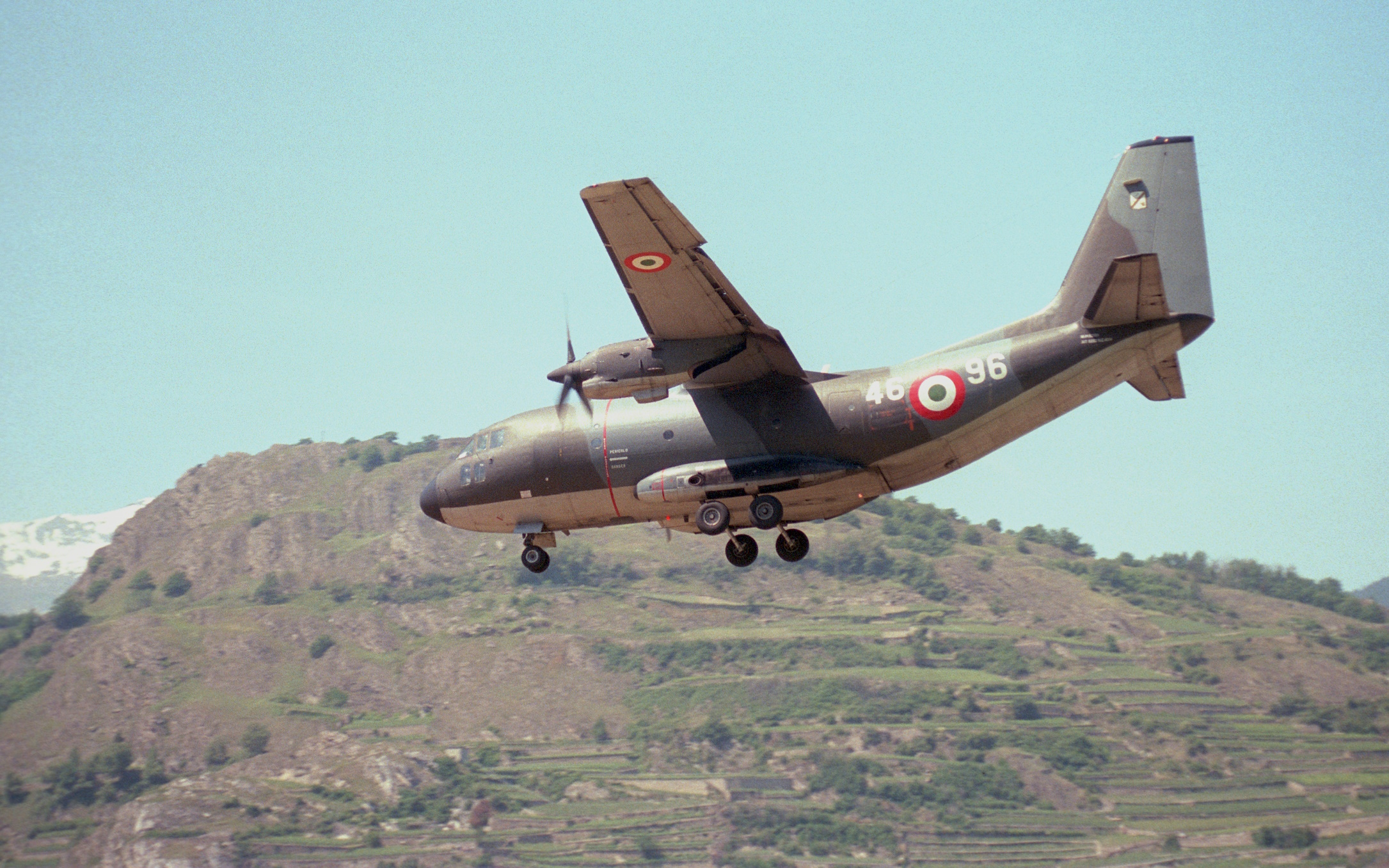
An Italian G-222 arrives at Sion Air Show in Switzerland, 1986

In November 1999, the Italian Air Force placed an initial order for twelve new-build aircraft of an upgraded G.222 derivative, designated as the C-27J, as a replacement for their existing G.222s. In December 2002, Alenia Aermacchi agreed to purchase a total of 39 G.222s that had been previously operated by the Italian Air Forces under a trade-in arrangement as part of the agreed C-27J purchase. In 2005, the Italian Air Force started the phased retirement of their G.222 fleet. Several of the former Italian Air Force G.222s have been refurbished to operational conditions and resold by Alenia Aermacchi, the Nigerian Air Force became the first customer for these refurbished aircraft.

In September 2008, Alenia North America was awarded a USAF contract to upgrade and refurbish 18 G.222s, to be transferred to and used by the Afghan Air Force. Ballistic protection, adaptations for serving in the conditions of Afghanistan, and many new avionics systems, including a digital auto-pilot, were installed; two aircraft were also configured for VIP transport duties. On 28 April 2010, the first two of the Afghan Air Force's recently delivered G.222s made their first public display during the Mujahideen Victory Day. In January 2013, the USAF decided not to renew the support contract for the Afghan fleet due to claimed serviceability issues and operational difficulties; Alenia responded, stating that the fleet was exceeding the requirements laid out by the USAF, with 10–12 aircraft available for operations against the requirement for six.

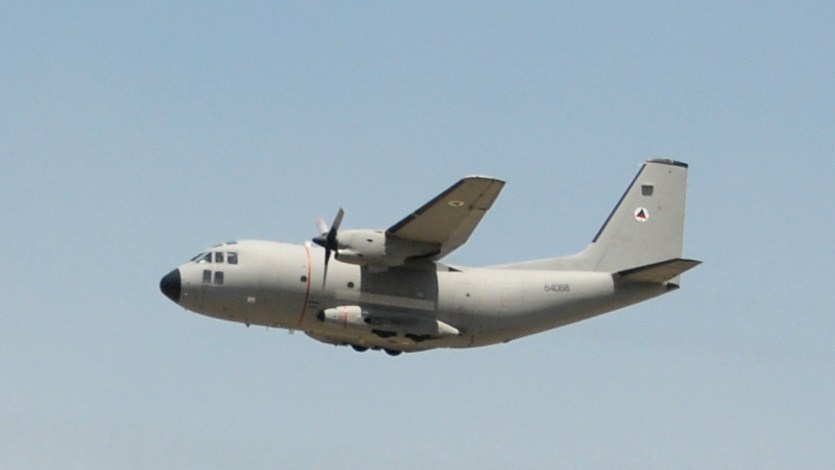
Afghan Air Force C-27A, 2010

The 16 G.222s delivered to Afghanistan were scrapped in the summer of 2014 by the Defense Logistics Agency. After the U.S. spent $486 million to buy 20 C-27As, 16 were sold as scrap to an Afghan construction company for about $32,000; the planes were reportedly scrapped "to minimize impact on drawdown of U.S. forces in Afghanistan." The four remaining aircraft are stored at Ramstein Air Base, Germany, with the U.S. seeking other interested buyers. From January to September 2012, the Afghan C-27A fleet flew only 234 out of 4,500 required hours. The C-17A fleet had been procured for their keep attributes to enable them to operate in Afghanistan terrain, they were former Italian G.222. However, they ended up being replaced by C-130H after maintenance difficulties.

== Variants ==
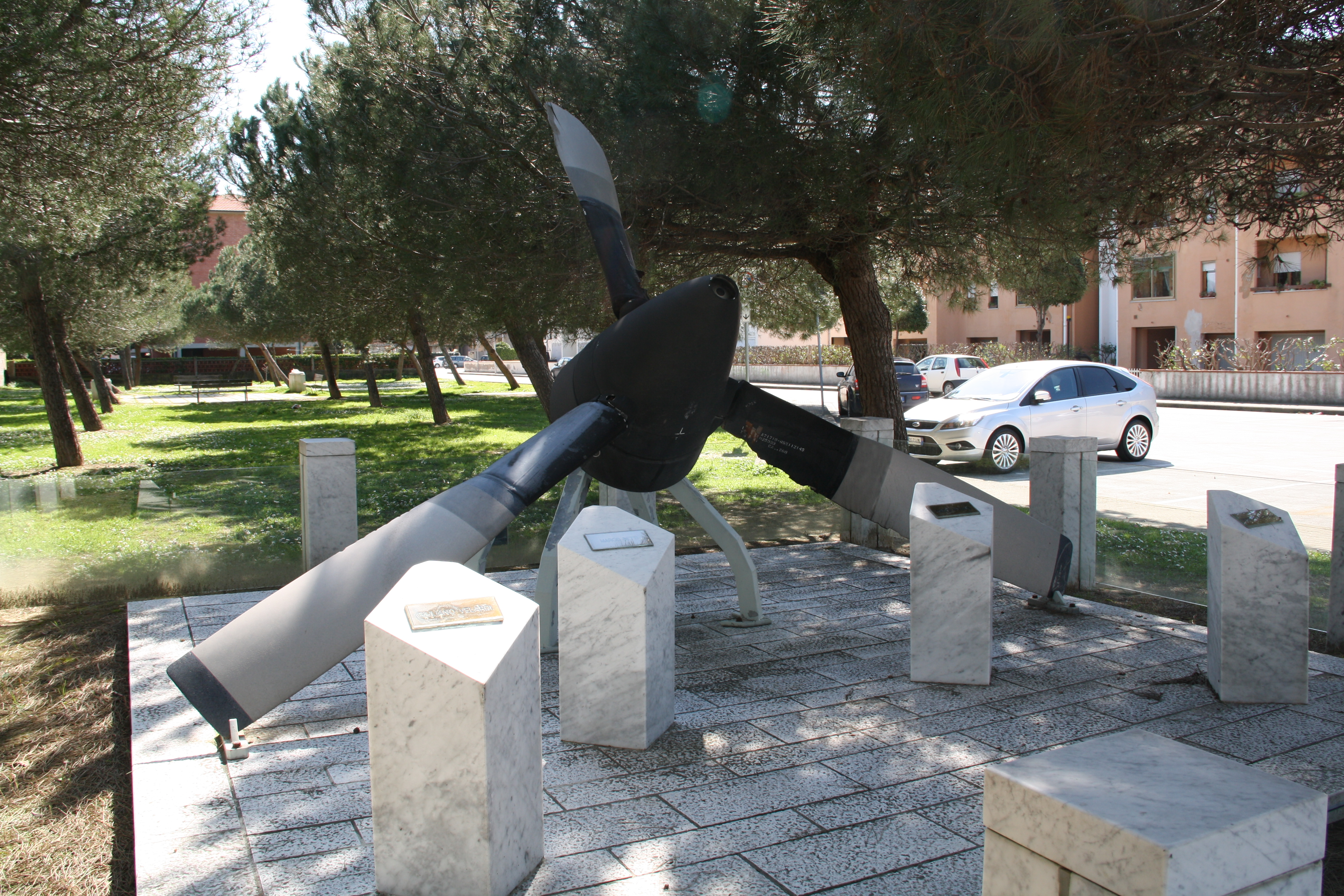
Memorial to the downed G.222 over Bosnia at Marina di Pisa

G.222TCM
Initial designation, two prototypes for the Italian Air Force

G.222A
Standard transport version for the Italian Air Force

G.222RM
(Radiomisura - "radio measurements")- radio/radar calibration aircraft

G.222SAA
(Sistema Aeronautico Antincendio - "aeronautical fire-fighting system") - fire-fighter equipped for dumping water or fire retardant chemicals. Four built for Italian Air Force.

G.222T
Version powered by the Rolls-Royce Tyne for the Libyan Air Force. Sometimes designated G.222L.

G.222VS
(Versione Speciale - "special version") ECM version - two built for Italian Air Force. Sometimes designated G.222GE.

C-27A Spartan
Ten G.222s purchased for the United States Air Force.

C-27J Spartan
See Alenia C-27J Spartan.

B.L.14
(Thai: บ.ล.๑๔) Royal Thai Armed Forces designation for the G.222.

== Operators ==
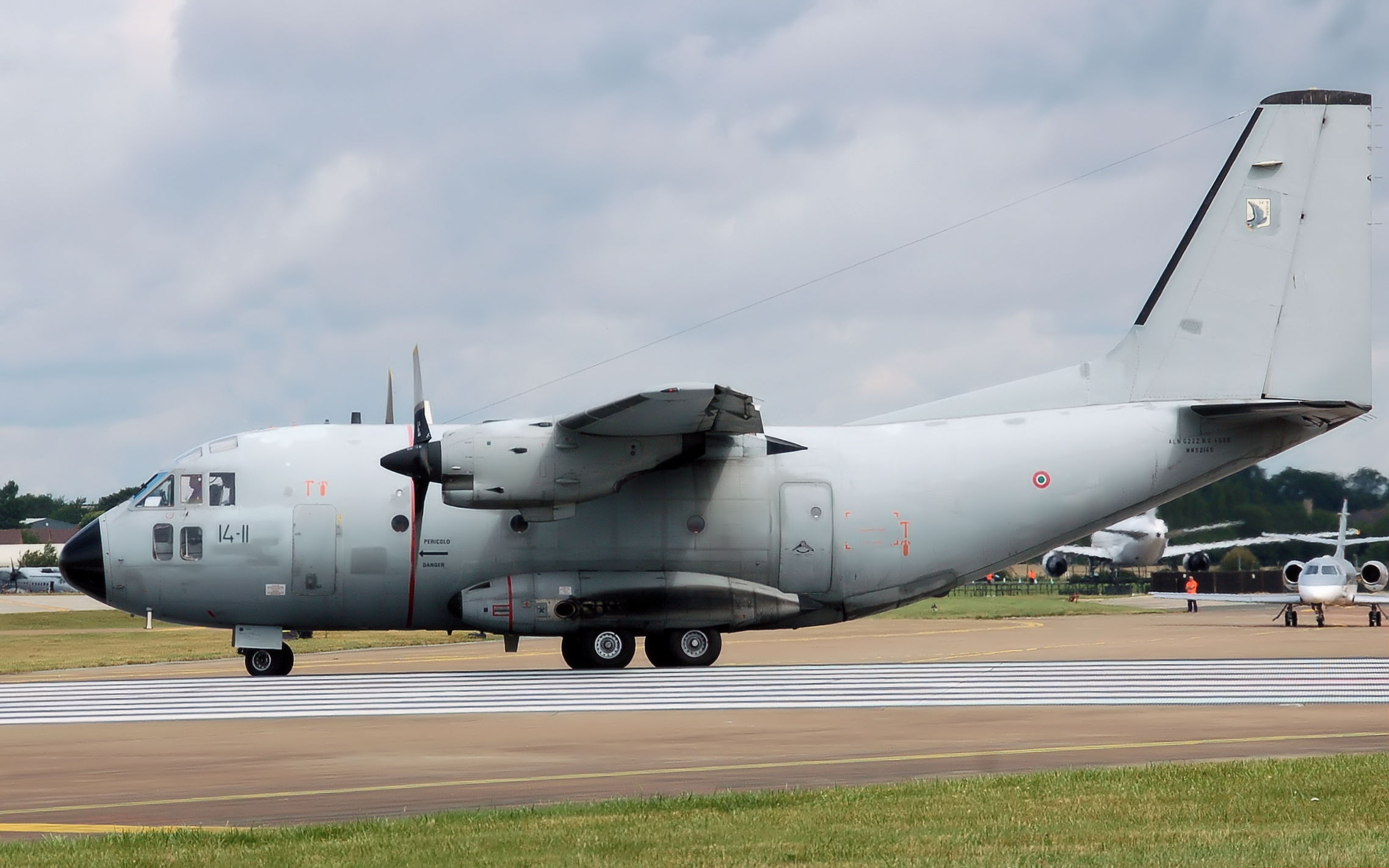
An Italian Air Force G.222A at the Royal International Air Tattoo 2009

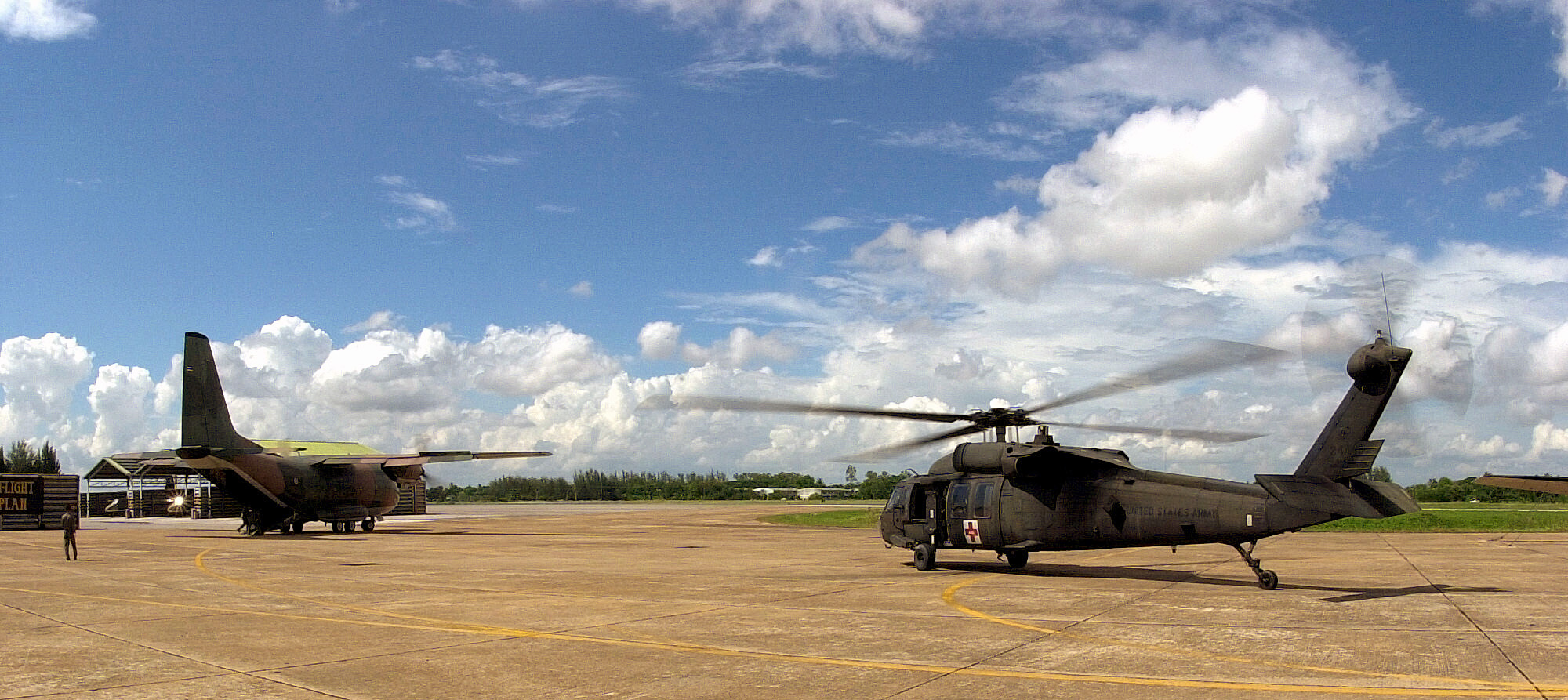
A Royal Thai Air Force G.222 during an emergency evacuation exercise at COBRA GOLD '01, with a US Army UH-60Q Black Hawk helicopter

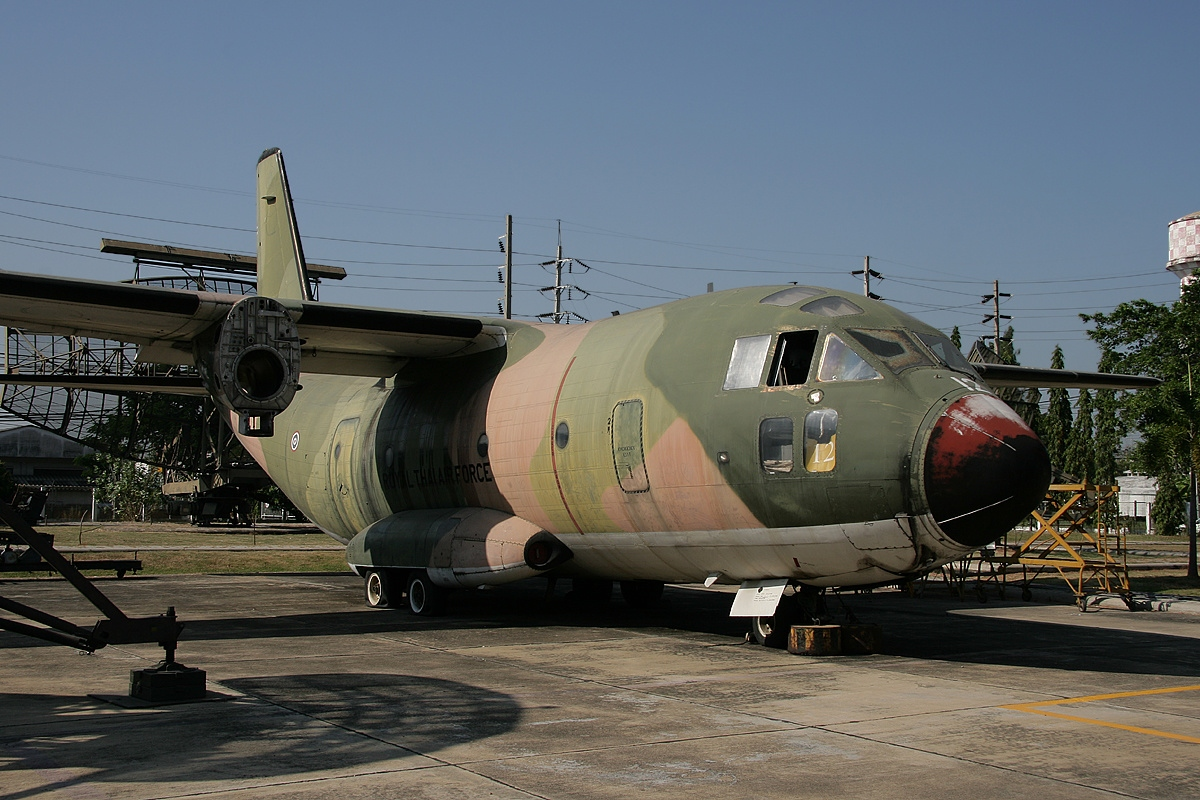
Former Thai Air Force G.222 in an aviation museum

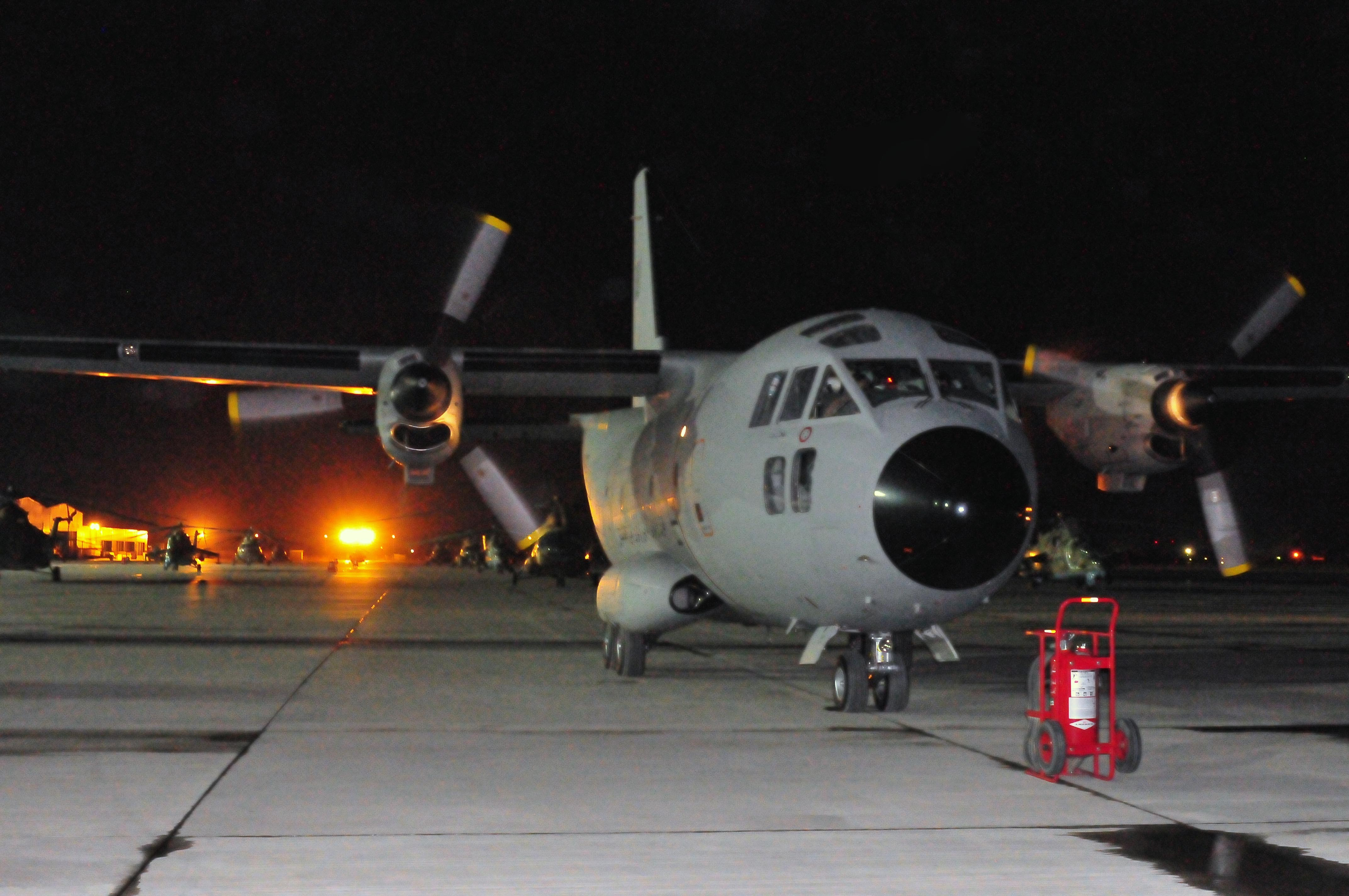
An Afghan Air Force C-27 at Hamid Karzai International Airport, 2010

Former operators

Islamic Republic of Afghanistan

- Afghan Air Force has received several former Italian Air Force G.222s under a USAF contract. Following upgrades by Alenia, deliveries began in 2009. By December 2012, 16 aircraft had been delivered; the USAF canceled the contract then because of lack of maintenance support from Alenia and scrapped them in summer of 2014.

Argentina

- Argentine Army Aviation had 3 aircraft. All retired as of December 2015.

Italy

- Italian Air Force operated 56 aircraft (44 G.222A, 4 G.222RM, 4 G.222SAA, 2 G.222TCM and 2 G.222VS). Officially retired in September 2005, but at least 1 G.222VS aircraft remained operational as of 2019.

Libya

- Libyan Air Force operated 20 aircraft. By 2004, these had all reportedly been sold to a private company.

Nigeria

- Nigerian Air Force operated a total of 6 aircraft, all now stored.

Peru

- Peruvian National Police

Thailand

- Royal Thai Air Force operated 6 aircraft; retired as of 2010.

Somalia

- Somali Air Corps received 4-6 aircraft.

Tunisia

- Tunisian Air Force ordered 5 aircraft never delivered.

United Arab Emirates

- Dubai had 1 aircraft (former operator).

United States

- United States Air Force operated 10 C-27A (1990–99) based at Howard AFB, Panama
- US Department of State has 4 ex-USAF C-27As for transport in support of counter-narcotics activities in South America, primarily Colombia.

Venezuela

- Venezuelan Air Force - 6 aircraft
- Venezuelan Army - 2 aircraft

== Specifications (G.222) ==
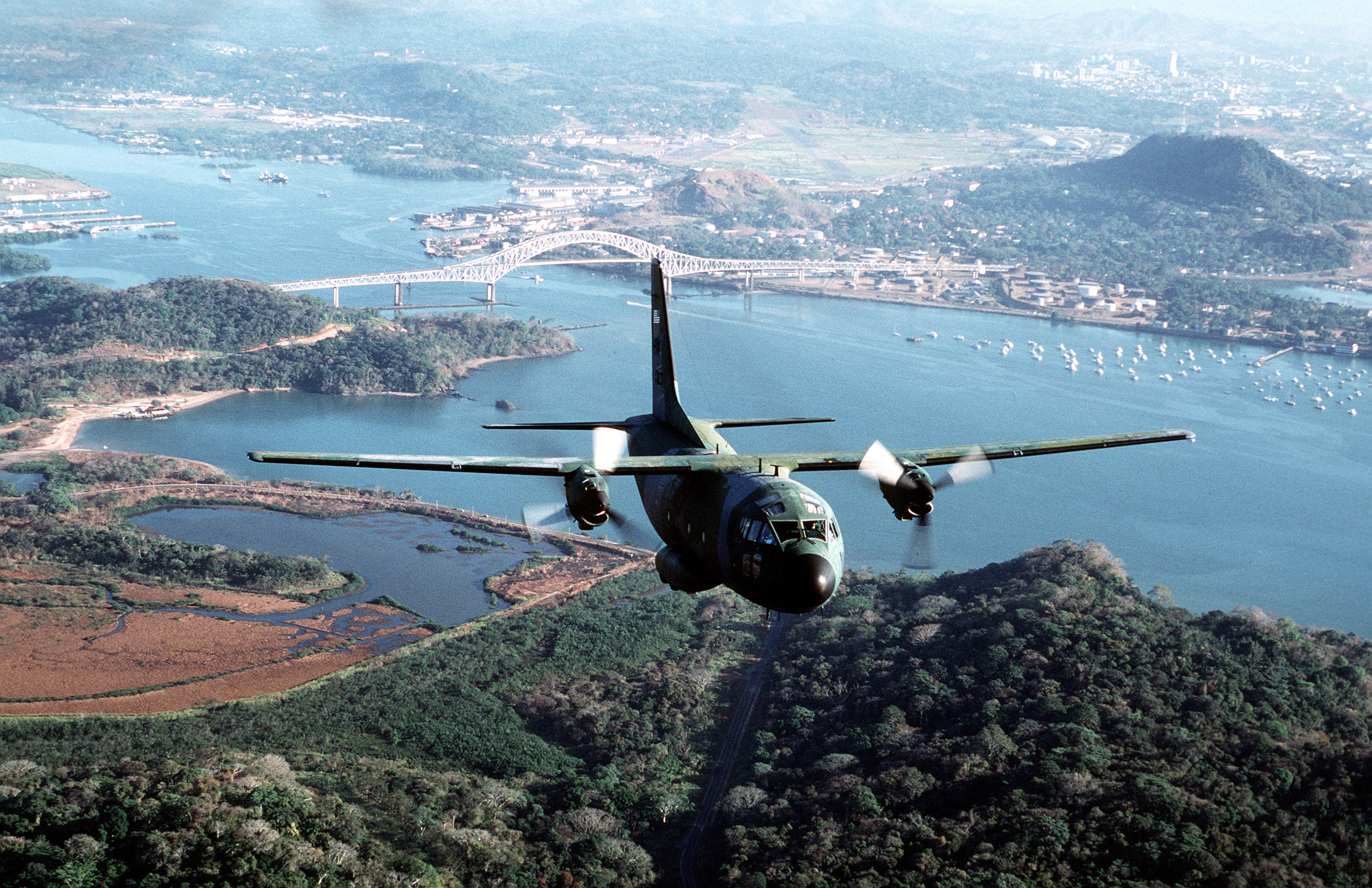
C-27A Spartan in flight, 1995

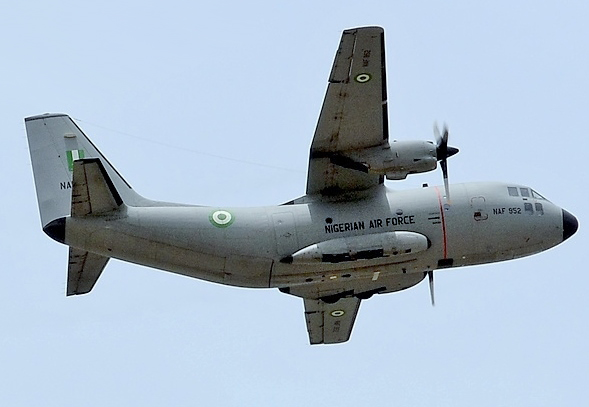
Nigerian G-222

Data from Jane's All The World's Aircraft 1985–86.

General characteristics

- Crew: 3 + 1 loadmaster / jumpmaster
- Capacity: 53 fully-equipped troops / 40 fully-equipped paratroops / 9,000 kg (20,000 lb) max. payload
- Length: 22.7 m (74 ft 6 in)
- Wingspan: 28.7 m (94 ft 2 in)
- Height: 9.8 m (32 ft 2 in)
- Aspect ratio: 9.15:1
- Airfoil: NACA 64A315.2
- Empty weight: 14,590 kg (32,165 lb)
- Max takeoff weight: 28,000 kg (61,729 lb)
- Fuel capacity: 12,000 L (3,200 US gal; 2,600 imp gal) in four integral wing tanks
- Powerplant: 2 × General Electric T64-GE-P4D turboprop engines, 2,535 kW (3,399 hp) each at ISA + 25 °C (77 °F)
- Propellers: 3-bladed Hamilton Standard 63E60-27, 4.42 m (14 ft 6 in) diameter constant-speed fully reversilble-pitch constant-speed propellers

Performance

- Maximum speed: 540 km/h (340 mph, 290 kn) at 4,575 m (15,010 ft) at Max TO weight
- Cruise speed: 439 km/h (273 mph, 237 kn) at 6,000 m (20,000 ft) at Max TO weight
- Airdrop speed: 204–259 km/h (127–161 mph; 110–140 kn) (paratroops and cargo)
- Stall speed: 155 km/h (96 mph, 84 kn) flaps and landing speed down
- Range: 1,371 km (852 mi, 740 nmi) with max. payload at optimum cruising speed and height
- Ferry range: 4,633 km (2,879 mi, 2,502 nmi) with maximum fuel
- Service ceiling: 7,620 m (25,000 ft)
- Service ceiling, one engine out: 5,000 m (16,000 ft)
- Rate of climb: 8.667 m/s (1,706.1 ft/min)
- Time to altitude: 4,500 m (14,800 ft) 8 minutes 35 seconds
- Wing loading: 341.5 kg/m^{2} (69.9 lb/sq ft)
- Power/mass: 5.52 kg/kW (9.07 lb/hp)
- Take-off run: 662 m (2,172 ft)
- Take-off run to 15 m (49 ft): 1,000 m (3,300 ft)
- Landing run at max landing weight: 545 m (1,788 ft)
- Landing run from 15 m (49 ft): 775 m (2,543 ft)

== See also ==
External videos
- A G.222 performing a demonstration flight
- Video of the G.222 suffering a nose wheel collapse during a heavy landing

Related development

- Alenia C-27J Spartan

Aircraft of comparable role, configuration, and era

- Antonov An-26
- Transall C-160
