= Fiat A.55 =

1930s Italian piston aircraft engine

A.55
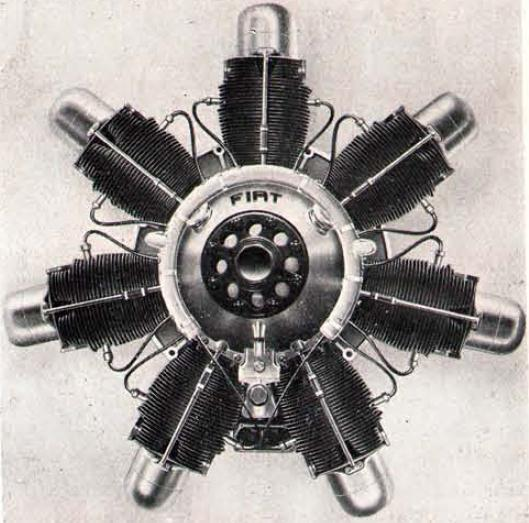
- Fiat A.55
- Type: Piston engine
- National origin: Italy
- Manufacturer: Fiat
- First run: 1932

The Fiat A.55 was a seven-cylinder, air-cooled radial engine developed in Italy in the 1930s as a powerplant for aircraft.

== Specifications ==
Data from Jane's All the World's Aircraft 1931.

=== General characteristics ===
- Type: 7-cylinder air-cooled radial
- Bore: 140 mm (5.51 in)
- Stroke: 160 mm (6.30 in)
- Length: 1,139 mm (44.84 in)
- Diameter: 1,290 mm (50.79 in)
- Dry weight: 290 kg (639 lb) dry

=== Components ===
- Valvetrain: 4x overhead valves per cylinder operated by seven individual camshafts, driven through radial shafts and bevel gearboxes
- Supercharger: centrifugal single-stage
- Fuel system: oil heated carburetor
- Oil system: dry sump with two pumps
- Cooling system: Air-cooled

=== Performance ===
- Power output: 300 hp (224 kW) at 1,900 rpm - normal

320 hp (239 kW) at 2,000 rpm - maximum

- Compression ratio: 5.5:1

== See also ==
Related lists

- List of aircraft engines
