= Giuseppe Gabrielli =

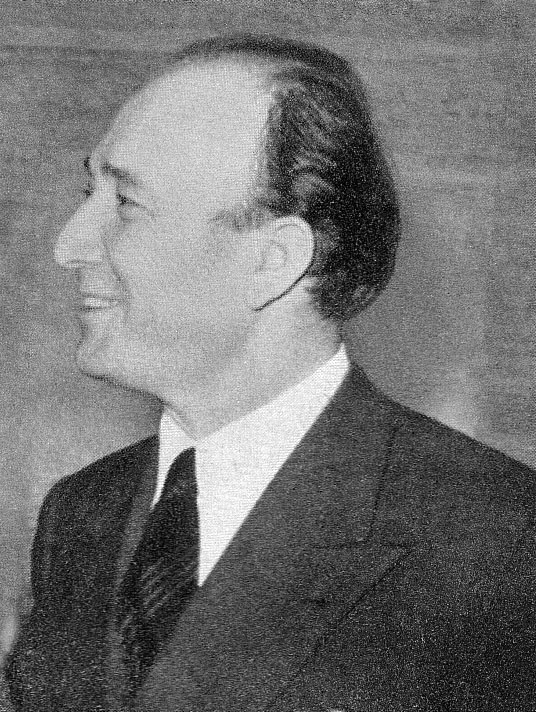

Giuseppe Gabrielli (26 February 1903 – 29 November 1987) was an Italian aeronautics engineer. He is famous as the designer of numerous Italian military aircraft, including the Fiat G.50 Freccia and Fiat G.55 Centauro World War II fighters.

== Biography ==
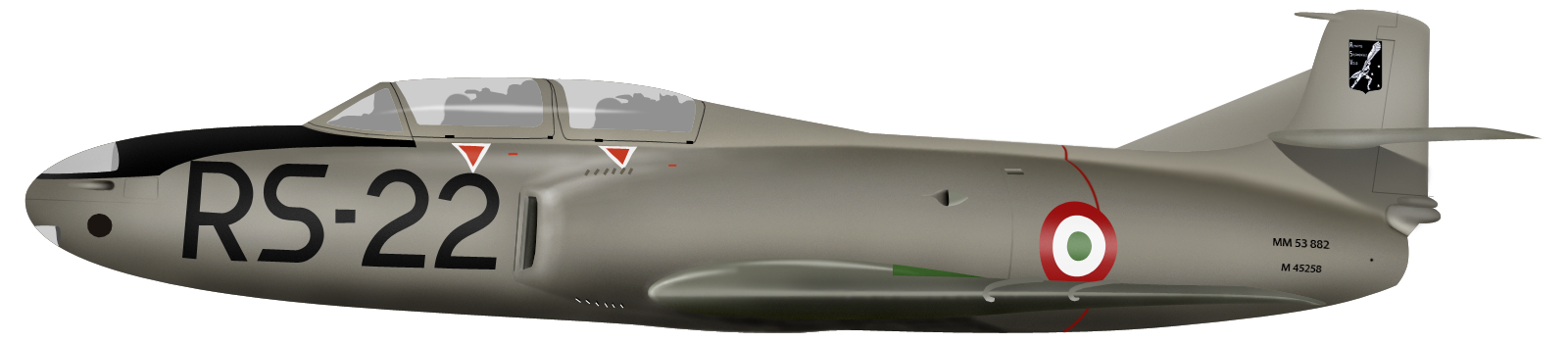
The FIAT G.80 was one of Gabrielli’s designs.

Giuseppe Gabrielli was born in Caltanissetta, Sicily, and studied at the Politecnico di Torino and at the Technische Hochschule of Aachen, Germany under Theodore von Kármán. Gabrielli began his work as designer at Piaggio, but was soon called to FIAT by Giovanni Agnelli to lead his aeronautics section.

Gabrielli designed 142 aircraft, all bearing his initial, including the G.50, the G.55, the G.80 (one of the first jets designed in Italy), the Aeritalia G.91, which won a contest for a NATO standard fighter in the 1950s, and the G.222, a military transport airplane, whose design was later evolved into the C-27J Spartan (with the addition of new engines and new avionics to the airframe).

Gabrielli was awarded the Ludwig-Prandtl-Ring from the Deutsche Gesellschaft für Luft- und Raumfahrt (German Society for Aeronautics and Astronautics) for "outstanding contribution in the field of aerospace engineering" in 1967.

He died in Turin in 1987.

== Bibliography ==
- Pozzato, Enzo (1998). "GABRIELLI, Giuseppe". Dizionario Biografico degli Italiani (in Italian). Vol. 51: Gabbiani–Gamba. Rome: Istituto dell'Enciclopedia Italiana. ISBN 978-88-12-00032-6.
