= Italian Air Force =

Air warfare branch of Italy's armed forces

- Aeronautica Militare
- Coat of arms of the Italian Air Force
- Founded: 28 March 1923; 103 years ago
- Country: Italy
- Type: Air force
- Role: Aerial warfare
- Size: 43,000 personnel; 962 aircraft
- Part of: Italian Armed Forces
- Patron: Madonna di Loreto
- Mottos: Latin: Virtute Siderum Tenus; "With valour to the stars"
- March: Marcia di Ordinanza dell'Aeronautica Militare (Ordinance March of the Air Force) by Alberto Di Miniello
- Anniversaries: 28 March (Air Force Day)
- Decorations: 1 Cavalier Cross of the Military Order of Savoy; 3 Cavalier Crosses of the Military Order of Italy; 2 Gold Medals of Military Valor; 1 Gold Medal of Aviation Valor; 5 Silver Medals of Military Valor; 2 Silver Medals of Civil Valor; 1 War Cross of Military Valor; 1 Silver Medal of Merit of the Italian Red Cross; 1 Gold Medal of Benemerited Public Honor; 1 Gold Medal of Merit for Public Health
- Website: www.aeronautica.difesa.it

Commanders
- Chief of Staff of Air Force: Generale di squadra aerea Antonio Conserva

Insignia
- Roundel

- Roundel Low Visibility

Aircraft flown
- Attack: Panavia Tornado
- Electronic warfare: Gulfstream G550, Panavia Tornado, Alenia C-27J
- Fighter: Eurofighter Typhoon, F-35 Lightning II
- Helicopter: Agusta-Bell 212, MD 500 Defender, AgustaWestland AW101, AgustaWestland AW139
- Patrol: ATR 72
- Reconnaissance: Beechcraft Super King Air
- Trainer: Alenia M-346 Master, Alenia M-345, Piaggio P.180, Tecnam P2006T, Aermacchi MB-339, SIAI-Marchetti SF.260, McDonnell Douglas MD 500
- Transport: Alenia C-27J Spartan, Piaggio P.180 Avanti, Airbus A319CJ, Airbus A340-500, Dassault Falcon 50, Dassault Falcon 900, C-130J Super Hercules
- Tanker: Boeing KC-767, KC-130J Hercules

The Italian Air Force (Italian: Aeronautica Militare; AM, lit. 'military aeronautics') is the air force of the Italian Republic. The Italian Air Force was founded as an independent service arm on 28 March 1923 by King Victor Emmanuel III as the Regia Aeronautica ("Royal Air Force"). After World War II, when Italy became a republic following a referendum, the Regia Aeronautica was given its current name. Since its formation, the service has held a prominent role in modern Italian military history. The acrobatic display team is the Frecce Tricolori.

== History ==
From 1923 until the end of WW2 the Italian Air Force was called Regia Aeronautica. The cockade of Italy is one of the symbols of the Italian Air Force, and is widely used on all Italian state aircraft, not only military.

=== Early history and World War I ===
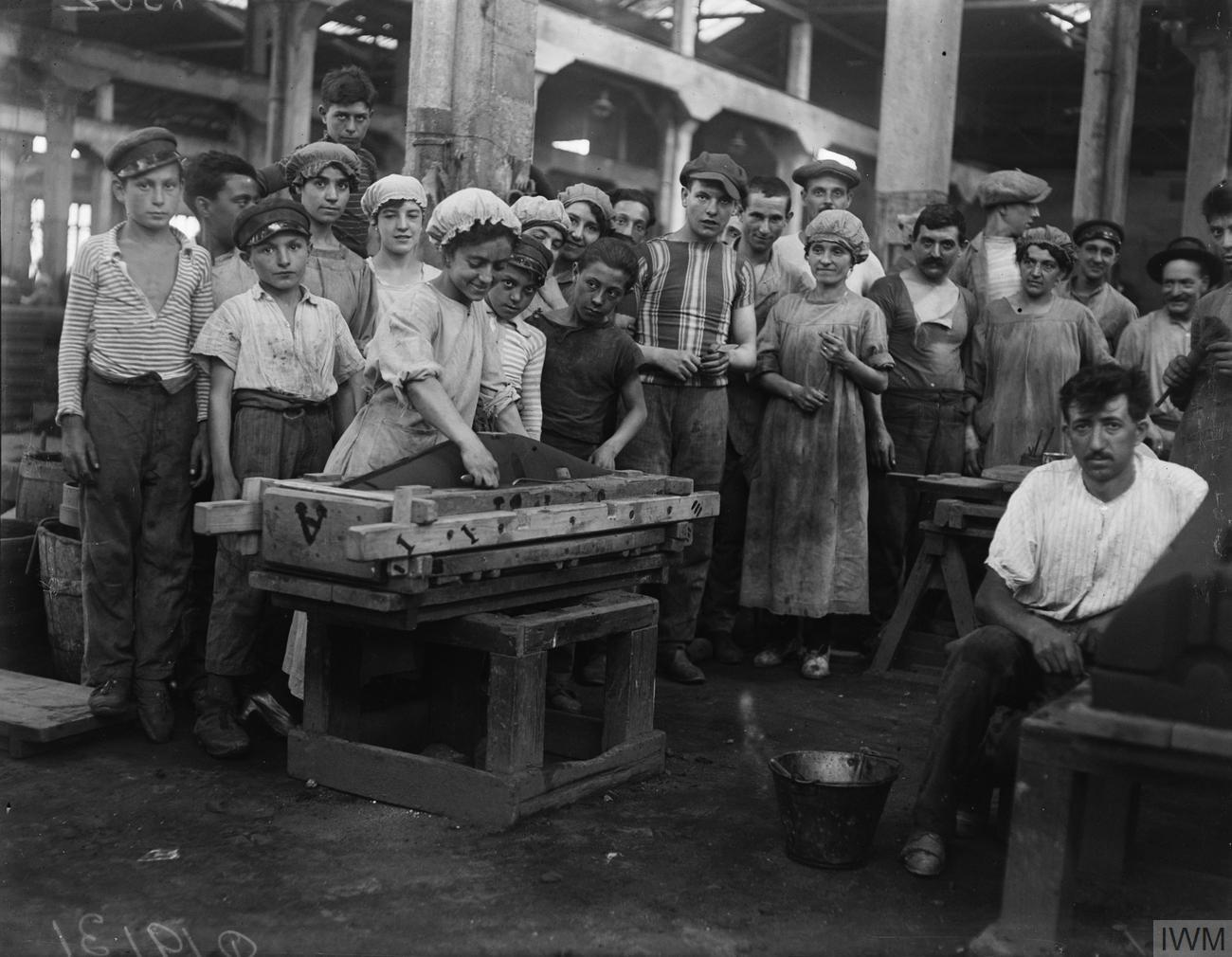
Aircraft manufacturing in Italy during World War I

Italy was among the earliest adopters of military aviation. Its air arm dates back to 1884, when the Italian Royal Army (Regio Esercito) was authorised to acquire its own air component. The Air Service (Corpo Aeronautico Militare) operated balloons based near Rome.

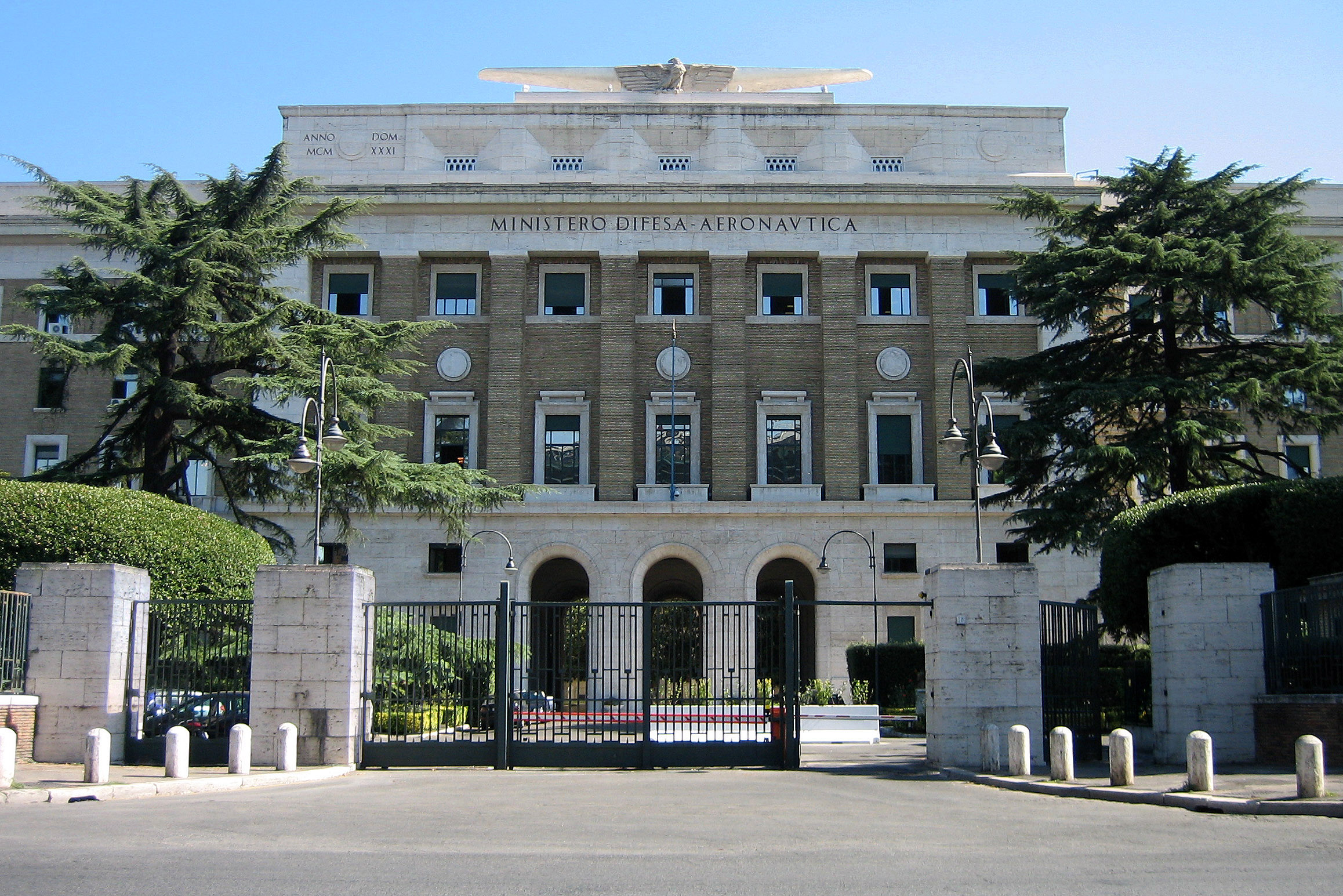
Palazzo dell'Aeronautica, headquarters of the Italian Air Force

In 1911, reconnaissance and bombing sorties during the Italo-Turkish War by the Servizio Aeronautico represented the first use of heavier-than-air aircraft in armed conflict.

The Corpo Aeronautico Militare, that later became the funding cornerstone of the italian air force in 1923, was one of the most important factors in Italy's World War I history, while it had quite the modest size and lacked advanced planes during the early war period it became by early 1917 one of the most important assets the italians could use, while it heavily used foreign designs for most of its air force such as the most commun french fighters, it also used many italian designs that were advanced for specific requirements, such as night bombing Caproni bombers, the most produced italian design of the period the S.V.A 5 bomber which had also had excellent recon capabilities, and the light bomber-recon planes such as the SIA 7 and Pomilio PE.

Not only were the planes more advanced tough, the production of planes in Italy became by 1918 one of the highest in europe, with 6400 planes built, outproducing Austria-Hungary by more than three times.

This advantage was one of the defining reasons for the italian victories at the Second battle of the Piave and later Vittorio Veneto.

=== Regia Aeronautica and World War II ===
On 28 March 1923, the Italian Air Force was founded as an independent service by King Vittorio Emanuele III of the Kingdom of Italy. This air force was known as the Regia Aeronautica (Royal Air Force). During the 1930s, the fledgling Regia Aeronautica was involved in its first military operations, first in Ethiopia in 1935, and later in the Spanish Civil War between 1936 and 1939. After a period of neutrality, Italy entered World War II on 10 June 1940 alongside Germany. The Regia Aeronautica could deploy more than 3,000 aircraft, although fewer than 60% were serviceable. It fought from the icy steppes of Russia to the sands of the North African desert, losing men and machines.

After the armistice of 8 September 1943, Italy was divided into two sides, and the same fate befell the Regia Aeronautica. The Air Force was split into the Italian Co-Belligerent Air Force in the south aligned with the Allies, and the pro-Axis Aeronautica Nazionale Repubblicana in the north until the end of the war. On 8 May 1945, the hostilities ended, beginning the rebirth of military aviation in Italy.

=== Birth of Aeronautica Militare and the Cold War ===
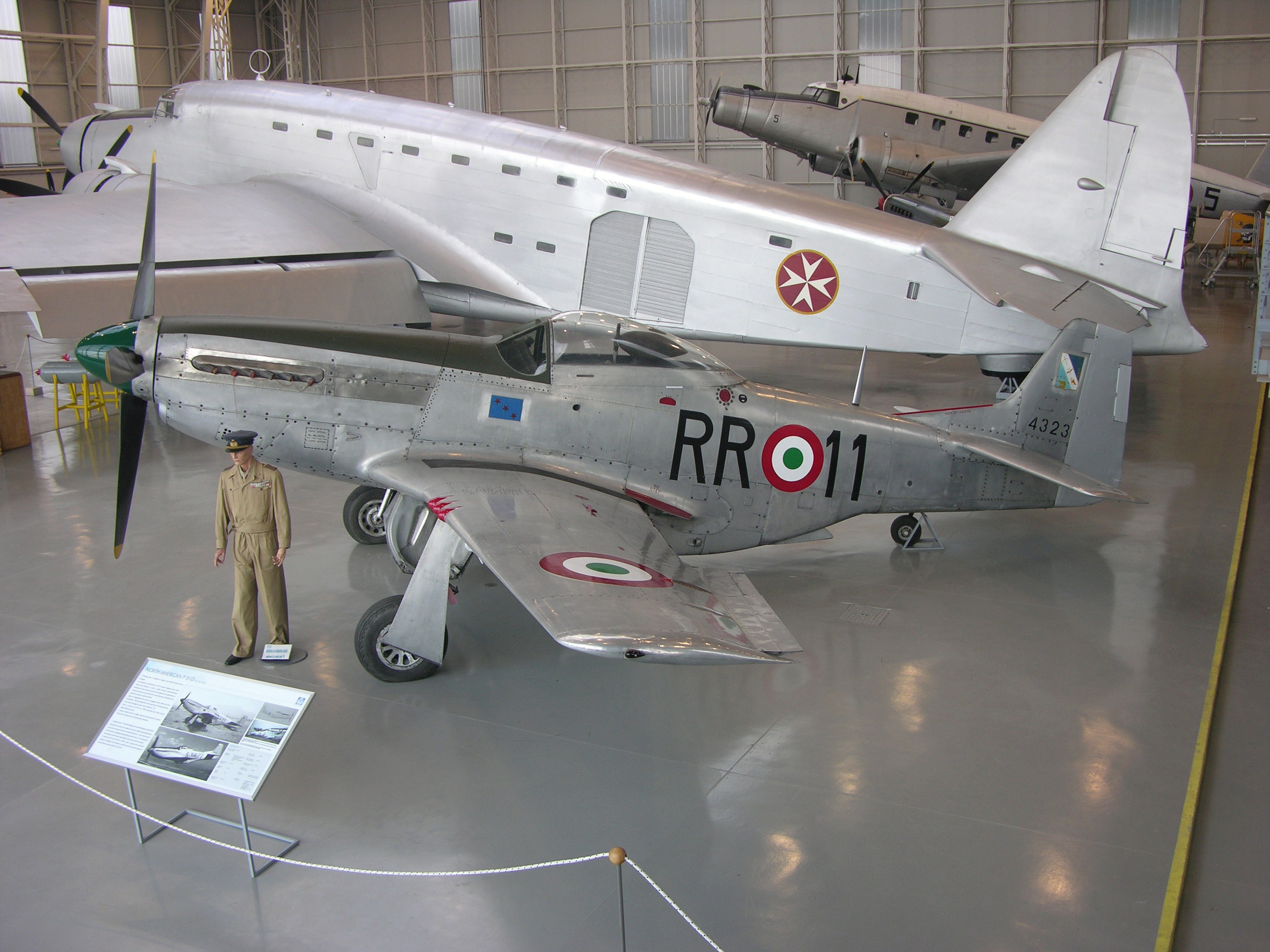
Italian North American P-51D Mustang exhibited at the museum of Vigna di Valle

A popular vote by the people resulted in the end of the Kingdom of Italy and the establishment of the Italian Republic on 18 June 1946. Hence the Regia Aeronautica lost its "Royal" designation, and it became the Aeronautica Militare, a name that it has continued to hold ever since.

The Peace Treaty of Paris of 1947 placed severe restrictions on all of the Italian armed forces, but the establishment of NATO in 1949 with Italy as a founding member brought about the necessity for the modernization of all of the Italian armed forces, including the Italian Air Force. American military aid sent by the Mutual Defense Assistance Program brought about the introduction of American-made P-47 Thunderbolt and P-51 Mustang propeller-driven fighter planes. In 1952, the Italian Air Force was granted jet fighters for the first time, American F-84G Thunderjets and F-86D Sabres, together with over 200 licence-built British de Havilland Vampires; these were followed by Republic F-84F Thunderstreak fighters and C-119 Flying Boxcar transport planes from the United States. The reborn Italian aviation industry also began to develop and produce a few indigenous aircraft designs of its own, such as the Fiat G.91, the Aermacchi MB-326, the Piaggio Aero P.166 and the line of Agusta helicopters such as the A109. Agusta also worked with Bell to license produce american designs, such as the AB 204.

The first supersonic fighters added to the Italian Air Force were American-designed F-104 Starfighters that were produced by a group of several European aircraft companies, including Messerschmitt-Bölkow-Blohm, Dornier, Fiat, Fokker and SABCA. During the 1970s, the Air Force acquired the Italian Aeritalia G222 and the modern American C-130 Hercules tactical transport planes, capable of carrying cargo or paratroopers. It also received the new Aeritalia F-104S Starfighter fighters for ground attack and air-defence purposes.

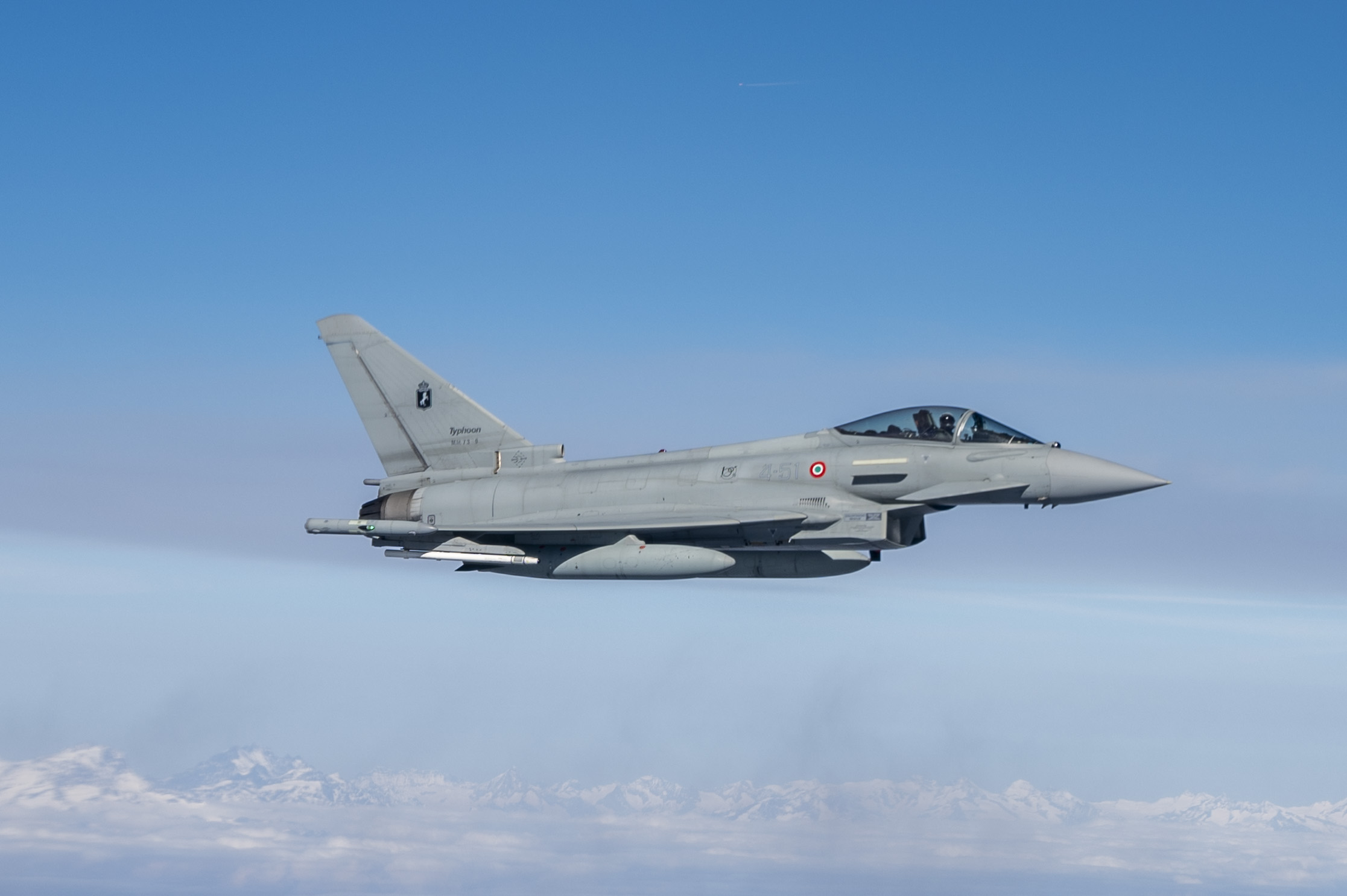
Italian Eurofighter Typhoon

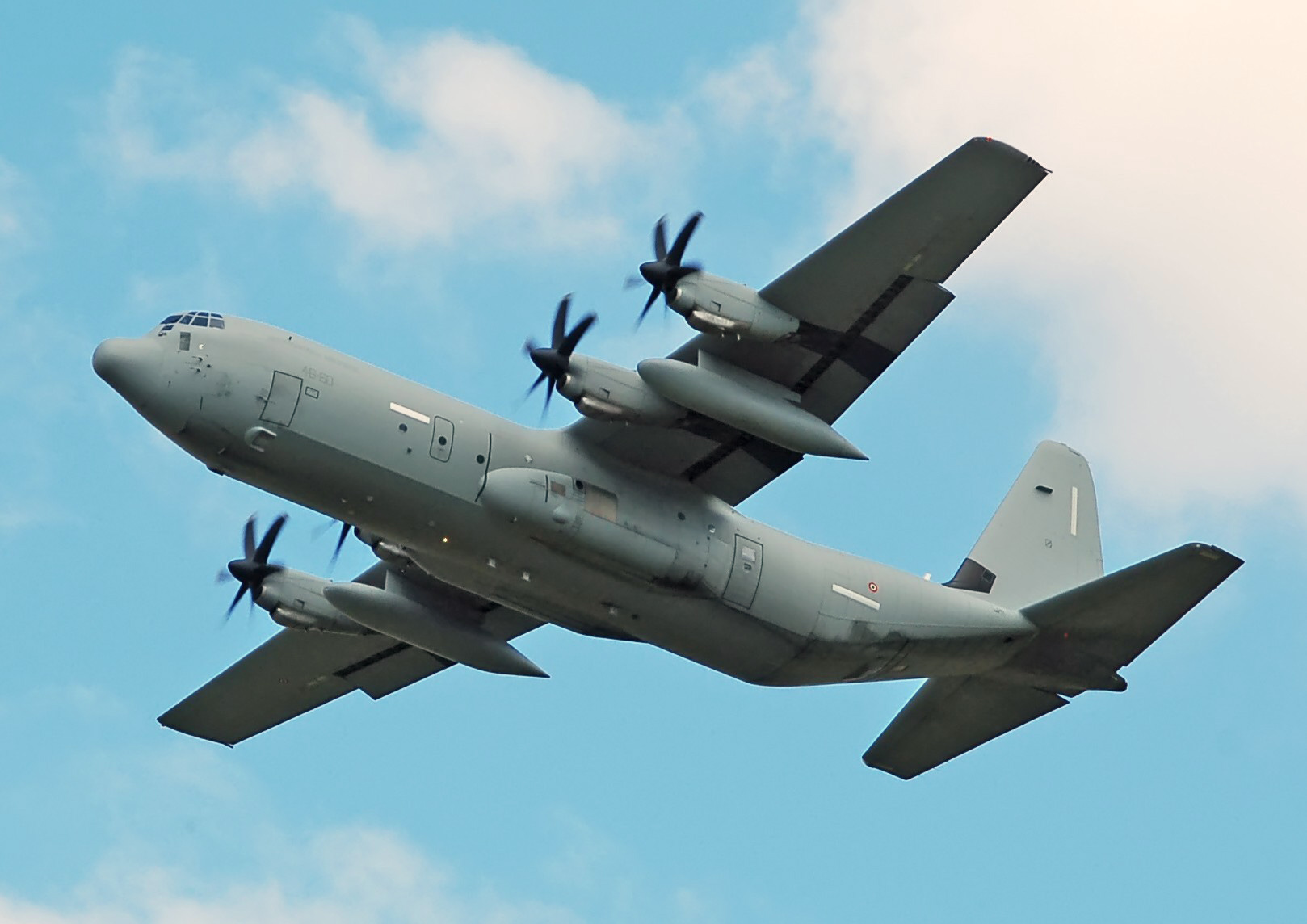
Italian Air Force Hercules C-130J-30 departing the 2014 Royal International Air Tattoo, England

A push to expand the Italian aircraft industry led Italy into the huge trilateral project that developed the Panavia Tornado fighter-bomber and air-defence fighters along with West Germany and the United Kingdom. Tornado fighters were still in service with all three nations, plus a few more, as of 2019. Italian companies worked with the Embraer Company of Brazil in a smaller project to develop and produce the AMX International AMX aircraft.

=== From the end of the Cold War to present day ===
In 1990, after the Iraqi invasion of Kuwait, Italy joined the coalition forces, and for the first time in 45 years Italian pilots and aircraft were assigned to combat operations. Needing to replace the obsolete F-104 Starfighters, Italy joined with Germany, Spain and the United Kingdom in the development of the Eurofighter Typhoon, which was expected to enter the Italian Air Force in 2000. In 1994, with the Typhoon still some years from introduction to service, 24 Panavia Tornado Air Defense Variant (ADV) interceptors were leased from the United Kingdom for a period of 10 years. The ADV Tornados served as fighter-interceptors to supplement and then to replace the old F-104 Starfighters. However, delays in the production of the Typhoon forced the Italians to seek a supplement, and then replacement, for the leased Tornado ADVs.

With the UK lease due to expire in 2004, the Italian government wished to avoid a costly lease extension and instead opted to lease 34 F-16 Fighting Falcon multi-role fighter planes on multi-year leases from the US. The last of these fighters was returned to the United States in May 2012, following the Italian Air Force's acquisition of a sufficient number of Typhoons over a period of several years. The Typhoons are intended to replace all of the F-104, Tornado ADV and F-16 aircraft. The last of the Italian F-104s was withdrawn from service in 2004.

Armed conflicts in Somalia, Mozambique and the nearby Balkans led to the Italian Air Force becoming a participant in multinational air forces, such as that of NATO over the former Yugoslavia, just a few minutes flying time east of the Italian peninsula. The commanders of the Italian Air Force soon saw the need to improve the Italian air defences.

The capability of the Italian Air Force as a transportation unit has been improved with the acquisition of 22 American C-130J tactical transports and 12 Alenia C-27J Spartans, which have replaced all of the G222s. In 2003, the Italian Air Force extended its capabilities to small-scale land warfare by small special-forces units. This was accomplished by forming the 17º Stormo Incursori ("17th Special Operations Wing"), also known as RIAM (Reparto Incursori Aeronautica Militare, "Air Force Raiders Group"), a unit that is primarily responsible for raids on land-based aeronautical compounds, forward air control missions and combat search and rescue operations.

== Equipment ==
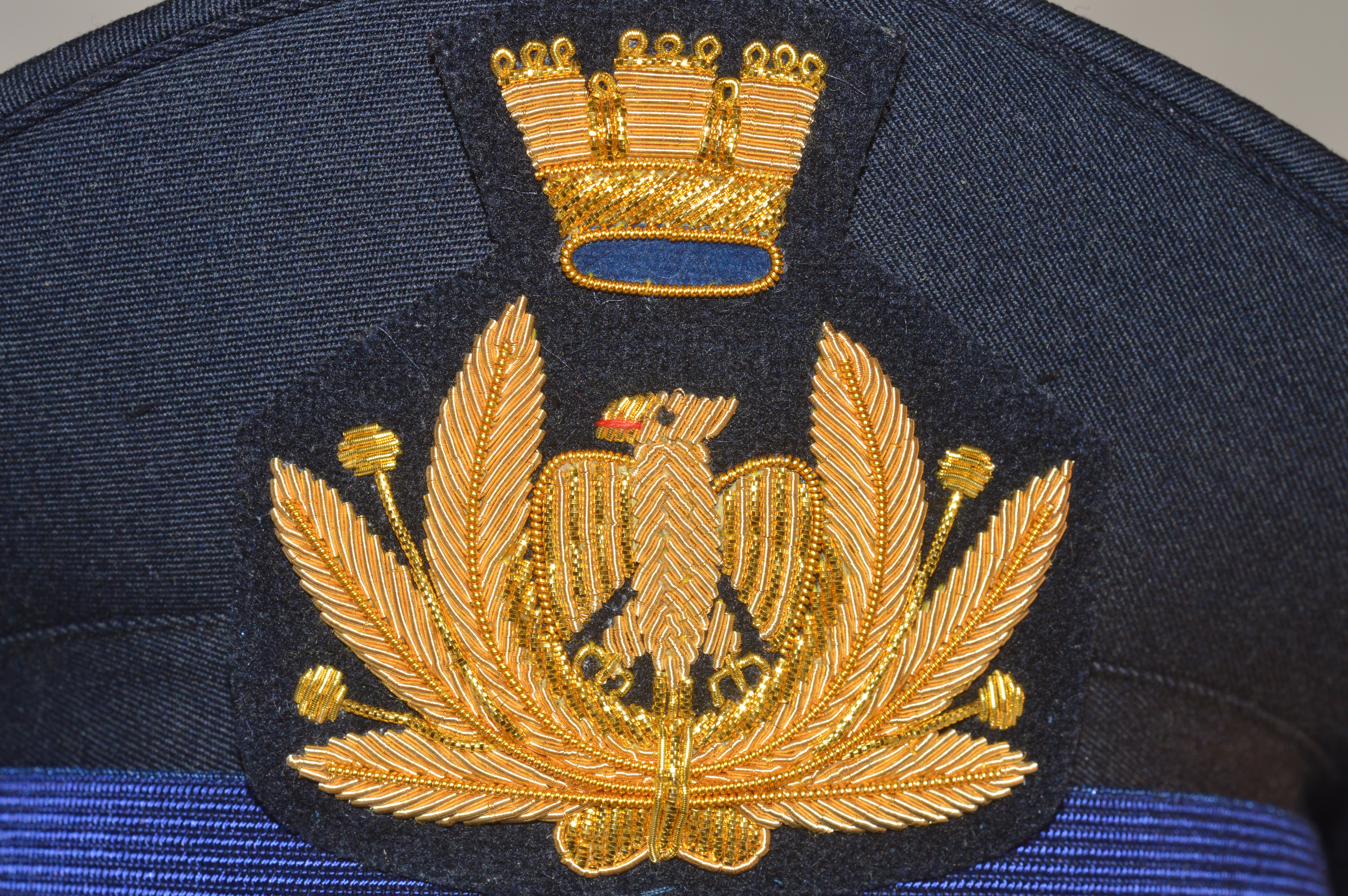
Emblem on the peaked cap used

As of 2014, the Italian Air Force operates a total active fleet of 557 aerial vehicles, including 209 manned and 12 unmanned combat aircraft, with 24 more Eurofighter Typhoon on order and 75 more F-35s planned. Italy is part of the GCAP program together with the UK and Japan for the development of the new sixth-generation Tempest fighter.

=== Air defence systems ===
Model	Origin	Type	Quantity	Notes
Short range air defence system
MAADS	Italy	Surface-to-air missile system	2	

== Rank structure ==
Officers

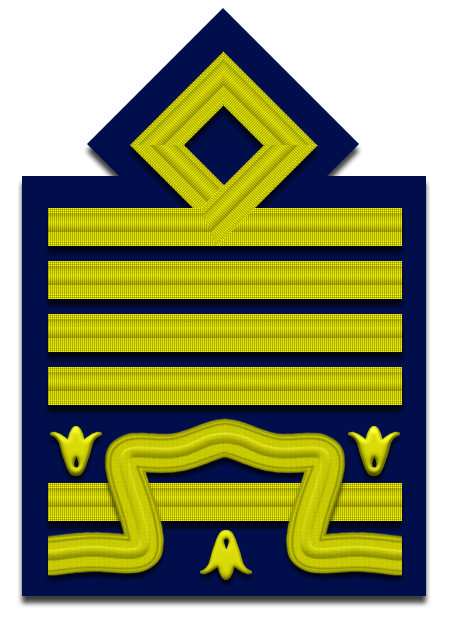
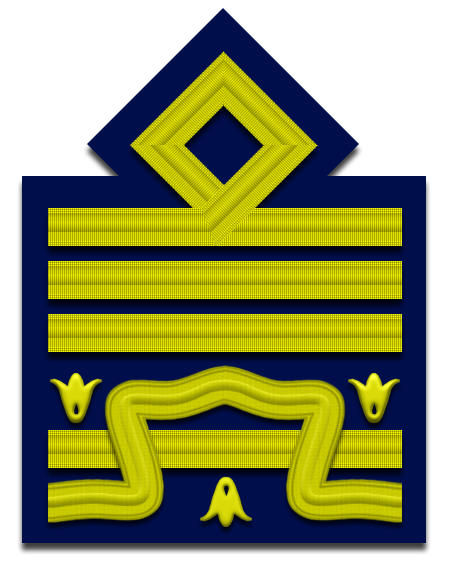
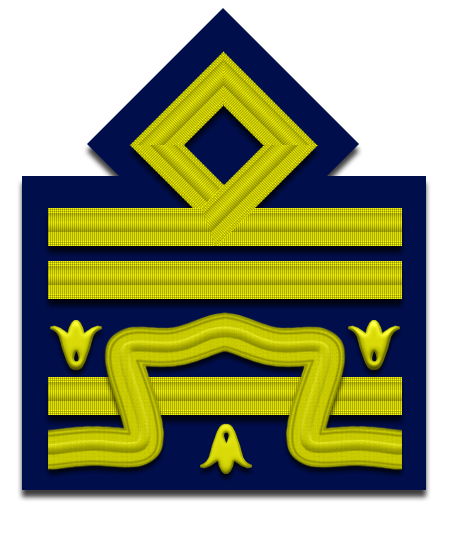
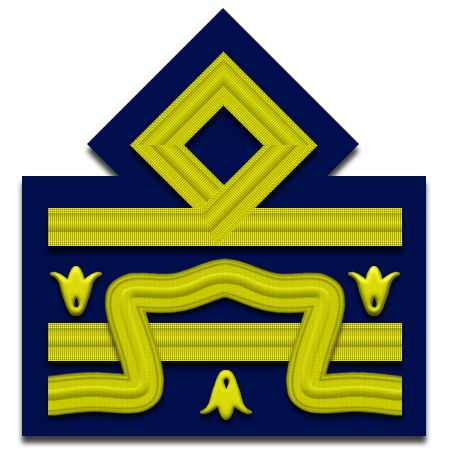
NATO code	OF-10	OF-9	OF-8	OF-7	OF-6	OF-5	OF-4	OF-3	OF-2		OF-1
Italian Air Force
Italian Air Force		Generale	Generale di squadra aerea	Generale di divisione aerea	Generale di brigata aerea	Colonnello	Tenente colonnello	Maggiore	Primo capitano	Capitano	Tenente	Sottotenente

Enlisted

NATO code	OR-9			OR-8	OR-7		OR-6	OR-5	OR-4	OR-3	OR-2	OR-1
Italian Air Force				Maresciallo di prima classe / Maresciallo di seconda classe / Maresciallo di terza classe					Graduato aiutante / Primo graduato / Primo aviere capo / Primo aviere scelto / Aviere capo			No insignia
Italian Air Force	Primo luogotenente	Luogotenente	Primo maresciallo	Maresciallo di prima classe / Maresciallo di seconda classe / Maresciallo di terza classe	Sergente maggiore aiutante	Sergente maggiore capo	Sergente maggiore	Sergente	Graduato aiutante / Primo graduato / Primo aviere capo / Primo aviere scelto / Aviere capo	Primo aviere	Aviere scelto	Aviere

== See also ==
- Italian Armed Forces
  - Carabinieri
  - Guardia di Finanza
  - Italian Army
  - Italian Navy
- International Flight Training School
- Uniforms of the Italian Armed Forces
- Centro Sportivo Aeronautica Militare
- List of aircraft used by Italian Air Force
- List of Regia Aeronautica aircraft used in World War II
- List of World War I Entente aircraft

== Sources ==
- Hackett, James, ed. (3 February 2010). The Military Balance 2010. London: Routledge. ISBN 978-1-85743-557-3.
- Malizia, Nicola. F-47D "Thunderbolt" (Aviolibri Records n.6) (Bilingual Italian/English). Rome, Italy: IBN Editore, 2005. ISBN 88-7565-021-7.
- Mattioli, Marco. Lockheed P-38 Lightning in Italian Service, 1943–1955 (Aviolibri Records n.4) (Bilingual Italian/English). Rome, Italia: IBN Editore, 2004. ISBN 88-7565-010-1.
- Owers, Colin (Spring 1994). "Fokker's Fifth: The C.V Multi-role Biplane". Air Enthusiast. No. 53. pp. 60–68. ISSN 0143-5450.
