= Fiat AN.1 =

1920s Italian piston aircraft engine

AN.1
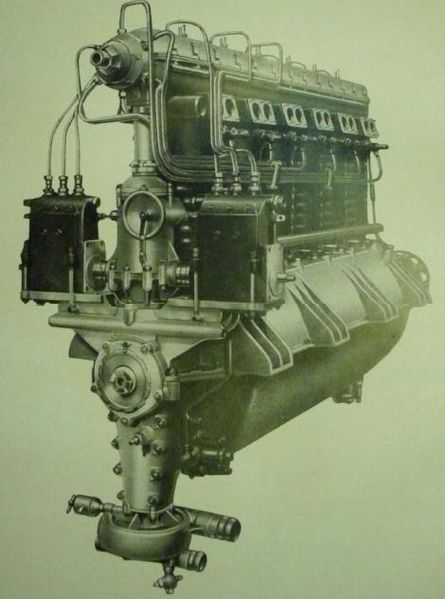
- Type: Water-cooled straight six-cylinder aircraft diesel engine
- National origin: Italy
- Manufacturer: Fiat Aviazione
- First run: c.1929
- Number built: few

The Fiat AN.1 was an experimental Italian water-cooled diesel straight six cylinder aircraft engine from the late 1920s.

== Design and development ==
Fiat's interest in Diesel engines dated from 1907, initially focused on slow turning factory engines then moving to higher speed marine and railway motors. The AN.1 was their first foray into Diesel aero-engines. To shorten its development time and to concentrate on the higher combustion chamber pressures, different burning temperatures and fuel supply systems of the Diesel cycle, they based its design on the Fiat A.12. This was a petrol engine first run in 1916 and produced in large numbers during World War I, a water-cooled, upright, overhead camshaft straight six. The AN.1 kept the external dimensions and the lower section, crankshaft, crankcase, sump, plus the lubrication and water-cooling supplies of the older engine but required new cylinders, pistons, valve gear and fuel delivery systems to replace carburettors and magnetos. The cylinder barrels had to be stronger to withstand the greater combustion pressures (2-300 atmospheres) required by the compression ignition Diesel. The swept volume of the Diesel engine was reduced by 23.4% as the cylinders had a bore of 140 mm (5.51 in), compared with the A.12's 160 mm (6.30 in). Two camshafts were fitted to operate the four valves per cylinder, though they were driven via the same tall vertical rod used for the single camshaft of the A.12, at its top, and the water pump of both models at its bottom.

The advantages of the Diesel engine were seen as:

- higher fuel efficiency;
- mechanical and electrical simplicity;
- non-flammable fuel;
- cheaper fuel, at the time only 20% the price of petrol.

In 1931 Diesel engines were seen as the future motors of long range commercial aircraft.

The AN.1 was test flown in at least two aircraft, easily replacing the standard Fiat A.12bis in an Ansaldo A.300/4 reconnaissance and attack aircraft and also mounted in a specially designed biplane, the Fiat AN.1.

== Operational history ==
The first public performance of the AN.1 engine was at the Aerial Pageant held at Rome in June 1930 in the AN.1 biplane. This was flown by Renato Donati from the Fiat works at Turin to Rome, a distance of about 510 km (315 mi), on the first morning of the Pageant then displayed over Littorio Airport.

== Applications ==
- Ansaldo A.300/4
- Fiat AN.1

== Specifications ==
Data from Flight 16 January 1931, p. 48

=== General characteristics ===
- Type: Six-cylinder inline, four-stroke Diesel
- Bore: 140 mm (5.51 in)
- Stroke: 180 mm (7.09 in)
- Displacement: 16.63 L (1,015 cu in)
- Length: 1.78 m (70 in)^{all dimensions are of the A.12 engine}
- Width: 0.59 m (22 in)
- Height: 1.14 m (45 in)
- Dry weight: 390 kg (860 lb)

=== Components ===
- Valvetrain: Inlet and exhaust valves are driven directly from two parallel camshafts. The inlet valves draw in ambient air.
- Fuel system: Each cylinder has its own fuel pump, arranged into two transverse banks of three at the rear of the engine. These meter, time and deliver fuel to an atomiser nozzle in the cylinder head which opens under fuel pressure.
- Fuel type: Diesel (heavy-oil, naptha)
- Cooling system: Water.
- Cylinders: Steel barrels with two inlet and two exhaust valves formed in each cylinder head and with a central seating for the fuel injector. Water jackets and valve chambers welded on.
- Pistons: Aluminium, with shaped heads to provide optimum compression ignition.

=== Performance ===
- Power output: normal 180 hp (134 kW) at 1,600 rpm; maximum 220 hp (164 kW) at 1,700 rpm
- Fuel consumption: 27 kg/(kW hr) (42 lb/(hp hr))

== See also ==
Related lists

- List of aircraft engines
