= Savoia-Pomilio SP.1 =

SP.1

General information
- Type: Reconnaissance and bomber aircraft
- National origin: Italy
- Manufacturer: SIA
- Designer: Umberto Savoia and Ottorino Pomilio
- Number built: 1

History
- First flight: 1916

The Savoia-Pomilio SP.1 was a reconnaissance and bomber aircraft built in Italy during the First World War.

== Design and development ==
The SP.1 was designed by Major Umberto Savoia and Lieutenant Ottorino Pomilio based on the Farman MF.11 that SIA was building under licence as the SIA 5b. While the SP.1 shared the same basic configuration as the 5b, it was a larger and stronger aircraft.

The pilot and observer sat in tandem in an open nacelle with the engine mounted pusher-fashion at its rear. This nacelle was mounted on struts in the gap between biplane wings, and a twin-tail arrangement linked by a common horizontal stabiliser was carried on booms that extended aft from the wings. SIA built the prototype at its factory in Turin, and while this was the only example constructed, it served as the basis for a number of follow-on designs, the SP.2, SP.3, and SP.4, which were built in large numbers.

== Specifications ==
Data from "Savoja-Pomilio S.p.1"

General characteristics

- Crew: Two, pilot and observer
- Length: 10.70 m (35 ft 1 in)
- Wingspan: 16.80 m (55 ft 1 in)
- Wing area: 68 m^{2} (730 sq ft)
- Gross weight: 1,850 kg (4,070 lb)
- Powerplant: 1 × Fiat A.12 , 190 kW (250 hp)

Performance

- Maximum speed: 115 km/h (72 mph, 63 kn)
