= Savoia-Pomilio SP.3 =

SP.3
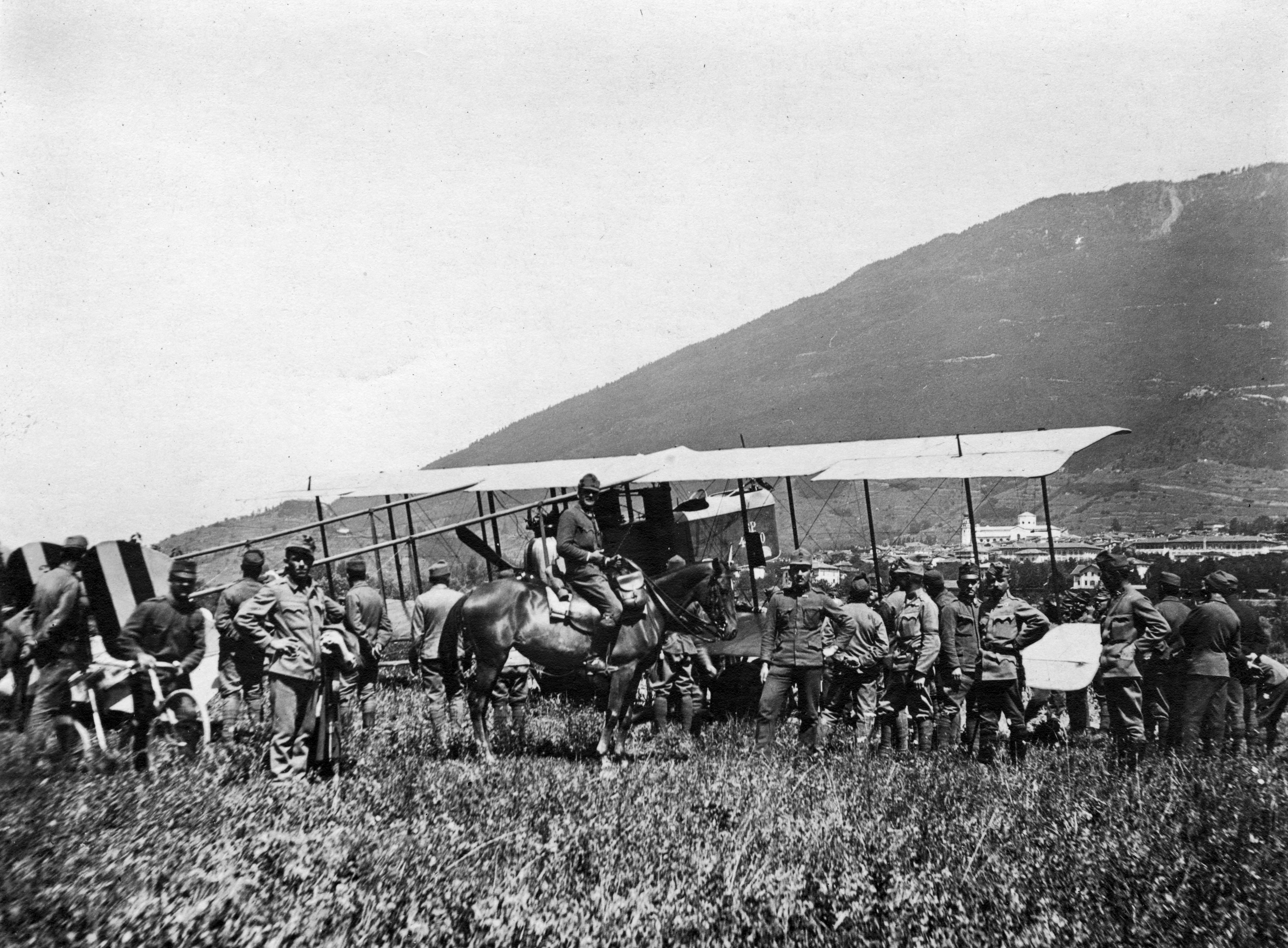

General information
- Type: Reconnaissance and bomber aircraft
- National origin: Italy
- Manufacturer: SIA, Pomilio
- Designer: Umberto Savoia and Ottorino Pomilio
- Number built: ca. 350

History
- First flight: 1917
- Developed from: Savoia-Pomilio SP.1

The Savoia-Pomilio SP.3 was a reconnaissance and bomber aircraft built in Italy during the First World War.

== Development ==
The SP.3 was a further development of the family of designs that had started with the SP.1. Ultimately all of these took their basic configuration from the Farman MF.11: a biplane with twin tails and a fuselage nacelle that accommodated the crew and a pusher-mounted engine. However, since the preceding SP.2 had been found to be too slow and vulnerable in front-line service, the SP.3 was designed for higher performance. The new design had a reduced wingspan, lower weight, and the aerodynamics of the fuselage nacelle were improved. Some were also equipped with an improved version of the Fiat A.12 engine, with its power output increased from 190 kW to 220 kW (250 hp to 300 hp)

The SP.3 flew in 1917 and was soon in production with SIA and Pomilio, who together built around 350 of them. By summer 1917, one quarter of all Italian front-line aviation units were equipped with Savoia-Pomilio types.

== Operators ==
Kingdom of Italy

- Corpo Aeronautico Militare

== Specifications ==
Data from The Illustrated Encyclopedia of Aircraft p.2898

General characteristics

- Crew: Two, pilot and observer
- Length: 10.95 m (35 ft 11 in)
- Wingspan: 14.70 m (48 ft 3 in)
- Height: 3.55 m (11 ft 8 in)
- Wing area: 60 m^{2} (646 sq ft)
- Empty weight: 1,048 kg (2,310 lb)
- Gross weight: 1,498 kg (3,303 lb)
- Powerplant: 1 × Fiat A.12 , 190 kW (250 hp)

Performance

- Maximum speed: 145 km/h (90 mph, 78 kn)
- Range: 450 km (280 mi, 240 nmi)
- Service ceiling: 5,000 m (16,400 ft)

Armament

- 1 × 7.62 mm machine gun
- light bombs
