= Fiat B.R. =

1919 bomber aircraft family by Fiat

BR
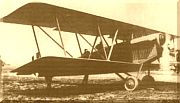
- Fiat BR

General information
- Type: Bomber
- Manufacturer: Fiat
- Designer: Celestino Rosatelli
- Number built: >250

History
- First flight: 1919

Fiat BR.1

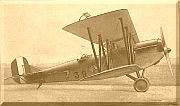
Fiat BR.2

Fiat R.22

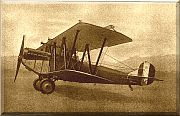
Fiat BR.3

Fiat BR.3

The Fiat B.R. 1/4 was a light bomber series, developed in Italy shortly after World War I.

== Design and development ==
The B.R was a development of the SIA 9 reconnaissance aircraft, incorporating major strengthening of that design. Its general layout was identical to its predecessor: a two-bay biplane with tandem, open cockpits for pilot and observer, and tailskid undercarriage. Shortly after entering service with the Regia Aeronautica, however, Rosatelli developed an improved version using the Warren truss-style bracing that would become a hallmark of his designs over the next decade.

The B.R. was evolved into a number of increasingly capable variants; however, by the time the later members of the family were produced, 15 years had passed since the initial design, and the type was already obsolete. At its peak, the BR equipped 15 light bomber squadrons of the Regia Aeronautica. Two examples were also exported to Sweden, and one to Hungary.

In 1922, a specially modified BR designated the R.700 was used to set the absolute world airspeed record at 336 km/h (210 mph). The same aircraft was used to contest the Coupe Deutsch de la Meurthe in September that year.

== Variants ==
- B.R. - initial production version with Fiat A.14 engine and conventional struts
- B.R.1 - improved version with new radiator and landing gear, and Warren truss struts (150 built)
- B.R.2 - strengthened structure, new landing gear, and Fiat A.25 engine
  - R.22 - reconnaissance aircraft of which two prototypes and 23 production versions were built. Although resembling the BR.2 it was of smaller dimensions and the wing and fuselage structures were all-metal. All examples flown by Regia Aeronautica with Fiat A.22 engine
- B.R.3 - new landing gear, fitted with radio and panoramic camera and (in later versions) Handley Page-type slats (100 built)
- B.R.4 - substantial redesign with revised aerodynamics, new landing gear, and new radiator arrangement (one built)
- R.700 - racer for world airspeed record attempt

== Operators ==
Hungary

- Royal Hungarian Air Force

Kingdom of Italy

- Corpo Aeronautico Militare

Sweden

- Swedish Air Force As the B 1 and B 2.

China

- Chinese Nationalist Air Force Operated the BR.3

== Specifications (B.R.2) ==
General characteristics

- Crew: two, pilot and observer
- Length: 10.66 m (35 ft 0 in)
- Wingspan: 17.30 m (56 ft 9 in)
- Height: 3.91 m (12 ft 10 in)
- Wing area: 70.2 m^{2} (756 sq ft)
- Empty weight: 2,646 kg (5,833 lb)
- Gross weight: 4,195 kg (9,248 lb)
- Powerplant: 1 × Fiat A.25 , 813 kW (1,090 hp)

Performance

- Maximum speed: 240 km/h (140 mph, 120 kn)
- Range: 1,000 km (621 mi, 540 nmi)
- Service ceiling: 6,250 m (20,500 ft)
- Rate of climb: 4.2 m/s (830 ft/min)

Armament

- 1 × fixed, forward-firing 7.7 mm (.303 in) Vickers machine gun
- 1 × trainable, rearward-firing 7.7 mm (.303 in) Lewis Gun
- 720 kg (1,590 lb) of bombs

== See also ==
Related lists

- List of Interwar military aircraft
