= Fiat R.2 =

Military plane

R.2
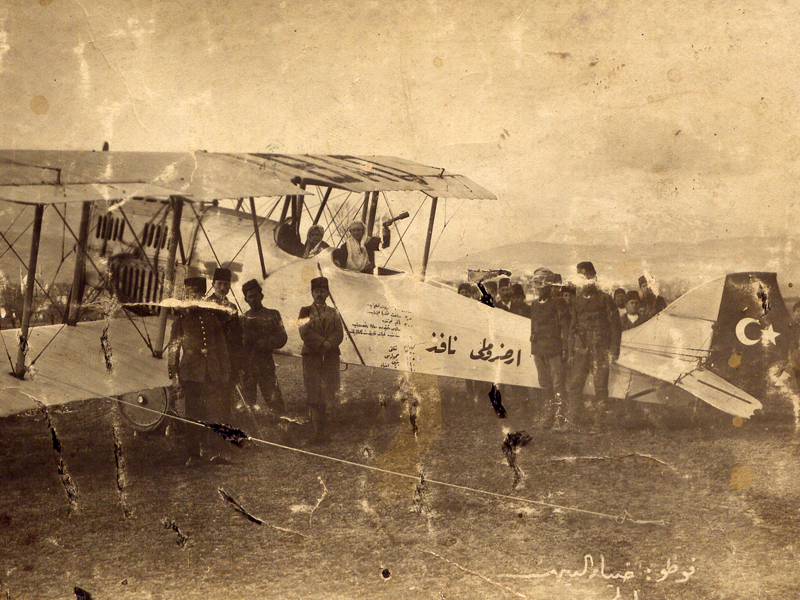

General information
- Type: Reconnaissance
- Manufacturer: Fiat
- Designer: Celestino Rosatelli
- Number built: 129

History
- First flight: 1919

The Fiat R.2 was a reconnaissance aircraft produced in Italy shortly after World War I, and the first aircraft to be marketed under the Fiat brand, (previous Fiat aircraft had been marketed as by SIA). It was a conventional two-bay biplane with equal-span, unstaggered wings and fixed tailskid undercarriage. The pilot and observer sat in tandem open cockpits. The design was a derivative of the SIA 7 and SIA 9 flown during the war, but was considerably revised by Rosatelli to correct ongoing problems with those types. A total of 129 were produced for the Air Corps of the Regio Esercito.

== Operators ==
Kingdom of Italy

- Corpo Aeronautico Militare

Turkey

- Turkish Air Force

== Specifications (Fiat-S.I.A R.2) ==
Data from Jane's All the World's Aircraft 1919

General characteristics

- Crew: 2
- Length: 8.75 m (28 ft 8 in)
- Wingspan: 12.32 m (40 ft 5 in)
- Height: 3.30 m (10 ft 10 in)
- Wing area: 45.6 m^{2} (491 sq ft)
- Gross weight: 1,720 kg (3,792 lb)
- Fuel capacity: 215 kg (474 lb) fuel : 40 kg (88 lb) oil
- Powerplant: 1 × Fiat A.12bis , 220 kW (300 hp)
- Propellers: 2-bladed fixed-pitch propeller, 2.8 m (9 ft 2 in) diameter
- Propeller pitch: 1.85 m (6 ft 1 in)
- Propeller speed: 1,500 rpm

Performance

- Maximum speed: 175 km/h (109 mph, 94 kn)
- Range: 550 km (340 mi, 300 nmi)
- Endurance: 4 hours
- Service ceiling: 4,800 m (15,700 ft)
- Wing loading: 36.7 kg/m^{2} (7.5 lb/sq ft)
- Power/mass: 0.1341 kW/kg (0.0816 hp/lb)

Armament

- Guns: 1 to 3 × machine guns

== See also ==
Related lists

- List of Interwar military aircraft
