= Fiat AN.1 (aircraft) =

AN.1

General information
- Type: Two-seat reconnaissance and aircraft diesel engine testbed
- National origin: Italy
- Manufacturer: Fiat
- Number built: 1

History
- First flight: 1930

The Fiat AN.1 was an Italian two-seat biplane from 1930, best known as a demonstrator of Fiat's first aircraft diesel engine, also named the Fiat AN.1.

== Design and development ==
The AN.1 was a two-seat reconnaissance aircraft built primarily to explore the suitability of diesel engines for tasks requiring long distance flying. In the early 1930s, diesel engines seemed to offer several advantages in such situations, particularly better reliability because of greater mechanical simplicity and lower fuel consumption, because of greater thermodynamic efficiency. Additionally, heavy oil fuel posed no fire risk and was at the time a fifth the price of petrol.

The AN.1 used a Fiat-built engine of the same name, much of which was based on the Fiat A.12 petrol engine, but with a new compression ignition upper half. It was a conventional biplane design, though little is known of its details. It first flew in 1930.

== Operational history ==
After some short test flights at Fiat's Turin works, the AN.1 made its first long-distance flight to Rome, a distance of about 510 km (315 mi), piloted by Renato Donati in June 1930. This took it to Littorio Airport for an appearance on the first day of the Aerial Pageant.

== Specifications ==
Data from Italian Civil and Military Aircraft 1930-1945

General characteristics

- Crew: two
- Length: 8.75 m (28 ft 8 in)
- Wingspan: 11.24 m (36 ft 11 in)
- Height: 2.97 m (9 ft 9 in)
- Wing area: 40.48 m^{2} (435.7 sq ft)
- Empty weight: 1,309 kg (2,886 lb)
- Gross weight: 1,597 kg (3,520 lb)
- Powerplant: 1 × Fiat AN.1 Six-cylinder inline water-cooled Diesel, 160 kW (220 hp) maximum at 1,700 rpm

Performance

- Maximum speed: 204 km/h (127 mph, 110 kn)
- Endurance: 3 hr 30 min
- Service ceiling: 5,190 m (17,040 ft)
