= Savoia-Pomilio SP.2 =

SP.2
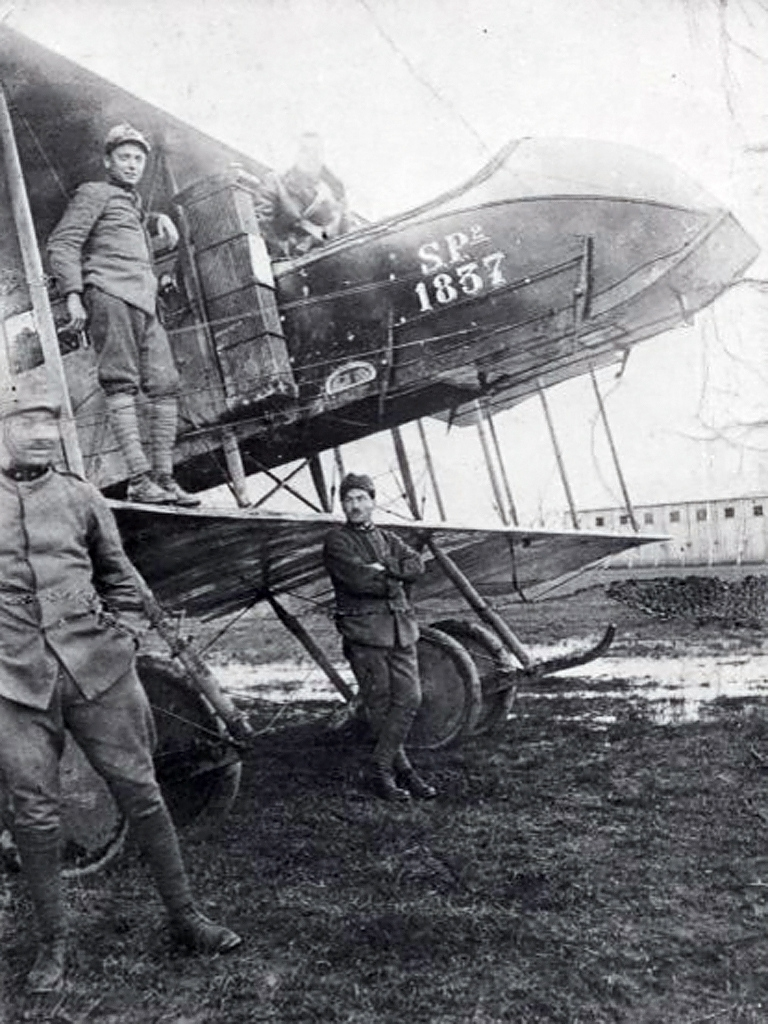

General information
- Type: Reconnaissance and bomber aircraft
- National origin: Italy
- Manufacturer: SIA, Pomilio
- Designer: Umberto Savoia and Ottorino Pomilio
- Number built: ca. 300

History
- First flight: 10 July 1916
- Developed from: Savoia-Pomilio SP.1

The Savoia-Pomilio SP.2 was a reconnaissance and bomber aircraft built in Italy during the First World War. It was a refined version of the SP.1, and like it, took its basic configuration from the Farman MF.11: a biplane with twin tails and a fuselage nacelle that accommodated the crew and a pusher-mounted engine. The SP.2 entered mass production with SIA, and with co-designer Ottorino Pomilio's own firm that he had recently established.

Around 300 examples were produced, and by spring 1917, these equipped twelve front-line squadrons of the Aeronautica Militare. Of these machines, about a dozen participated in trials of the Revelli-FIAT 25 mm cannon before production of this weapon was discontinued.

== Operators ==
Kingdom of Italy

- Corpo Aeronautico Militare

== Specifications ==
Data from Taylor 1989, p.793

General characteristics

- Crew: Two, pilot and observer
- Length: 10.77 m (35 ft 4 in)
- Wingspan: 16.74 m (54 ft 11 in)
- Gross weight: 1,700 kg (3,750 lb)
- Powerplant: 1 × Fiat A.12 , 190 kW (250 hp)

Performance

- Maximum speed: 120 km/h (75 mph, 65 kn)
- Range: 450 km (280 mi, 240 nmi)
