= Fiat A.25 =

1920s Italian piston aircraft engine

A.25
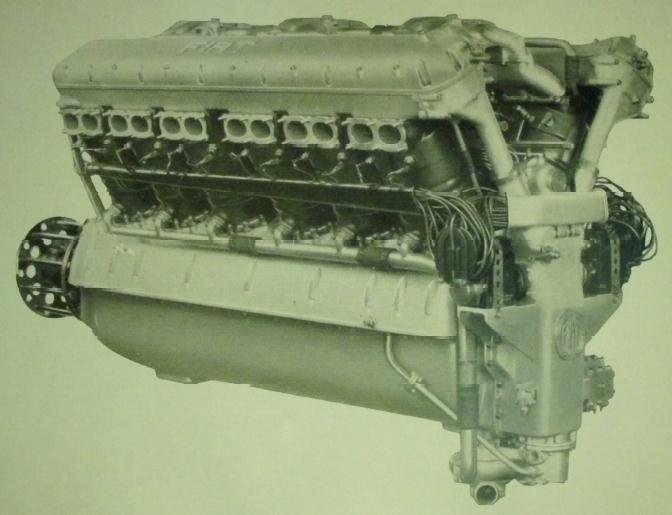
- Type: Water cooled V12
- National origin: Italy
- Manufacturer: Fiat Aviazione
- First run: c.1924
- Number built: several hundred

The Fiat A.25 was an Italian water-cooled V12 aircraft engine from the 1920s. It produced 708 kW (950 hp) and was used by the Regia Aeronautica for fifteen years to power their Fiat BR.2 and BR.3 bombers.

== Design and development ==
During the 1920s Fiat introduced several water-cooled aircraft engines, including the A.20, A.22, A24, A.25 and A.30. They were all upright V12s with 60° between the cylinder banks; capacities ranged between 18.7 L and 54.5 L (1,141-3,324 cu in) and power outputs between 320 kW and 745 kW (430-1,000 hp).

Producing 710 kW (950 hp) from 54.5 L (3,324 cu in), the A.25 was the largest and most powerful in the range. When Fiat were advised by the government to simplify their water-cooled product line, they focussed on the A.20, A.22 and A.30 models, so the A.25 was not further developed. They concentrated their higher power development effort on radial engines instead.

== Operational history ==
The only series produced types powered by the A.25 were the Fiat BR.2 and BR.3 single engine bombers. These began operating with the Regia Aeronautica in 1925. Some, used as trainers, were still in service in 1939.

== Applications ==
- Fiat BR.2
- Fiat BR.3
- Fiat BR.4

== Specifications ==
Data from Flight 25 July 1929, pp.773-4 and Jane's All the World's Aircraft 1938

=== General characteristics ===
- Type: water cooled 60° upright V12
- Bore: 170 mm (5.31 in)
- Stroke: 200 mm (6.29 in)
- Displacement: 54.48 L (3,324 cu in)
- Dry weight: 841 kg (1,854 lb)

=== Components ===
- Valvetrain: Two overhead camshafts, driven via enclosed, inclined shafts. The cams operate two inlet and two exhaust valves per cylinder. Housed under aluminium casings.
- Fuel system: Three water heated Fiat carburettors mounted between cylinder banks, one serving each bank. Four spark plugs per cylinder, supplied by two Marelli MF.12 magnetos.
- Oil system: One delivery pump and two scavenge pumps, in a single unit.
- Cooling system: water, with centrifugal pump.
- Cylinders: Forged steel barrels, with closed, flat ends.
- Pistons: Aluminium alloy, two compression rings and one scraper ring above a fully floating gudgeon pin, with a second scraper ring below it.
- Crankshaft: Each six throw, seven bearings.
- Crankcase: Each an aluminium casting, split on crankshaft centre line. Bolted-on duralumin end caps.

=== Performance ===
- Power output: normal, 708 kW (950 hp) at 1,700 rpm at sea level. Maximum, 745 kW (1,000 hp) at 1,900 rpm.
- Compression ratio: 5.25:1

== See also ==
Related lists

- List of aircraft engines
