= Savoia-Pomilio SP.4 =

SP.4

General information
- Type: Reconnaissance and bomber aircraft
- National origin: Italy
- Manufacturer: AER
- Designer: Umberto Savoia and Ottorino Pomilio
- Number built: ca. 150

History
- First flight: 1917
- Developed from: Savoia-Pomilio SP.1

The Savoia-Pomilio SP.4 was a reconnaissance and bomber aircraft built in Italy during the First World War. It was a further development of the family of designs that had started with the SP.1. Ultimately all of these took their basic configuration from the Farman MF.11: a biplane with twin tails and a fuselage nacelle that accommodated the crew and a pusher-mounted engine. However, the SP.4 differed both from its Farman antecedent and the previous Savoia-Pomilio designs by featuring twin engines mounted in the interplane gap in place of the single engine in the nacelle. Removing the engine from this position allowed a second machine gun to be placed there instead.

Apart from their intended role as a reconnaissance aircraft and bomber, some SP.4s were used to insert spies and saboteurs behind enemy lines. A further development designated SP.5 remained unbuilt by the end of the war.

== Operators ==
Kingdom of Italy

- Corpo Aeronautico Militare

== Specifications ==
Data from "Savoja-Pomilio S.p.4"

General characteristics

- Crew: Two, pilot and observer
- Length: 10.70 m (35 ft 1 in)
- Wingspan: 19.80 m (65 ft 0 in)
- Wing area: 78 m^{2} (839 sq ft)
- Gross weight: 2,300 kg (5,060 lb)
- Powerplant: 2 × Isotta-Fraschini V.4B , 110 kW (150 hp) each

Performance

- Maximum speed: 150 km/h (94 mph, 82 kn)

Armament

- 2 × machine guns
