= Fukunaga Tenryu 10 =

1920s Japanese civil passenger aircraft

Tenryu 10

General information
- Type: Passenger biplane
- National origin: Japan
- Manufacturer: Fukunaga Aeroplane Manufacturing Works
- Designer: Tomizo Asami
- Number built: 1

History
- First flight: 26 October 1922

The Fukunaga Tenryu 10 was the largest Japanese civil passenger aircraft when it first flew in 1922. Its passenger cabin seated four.

== Design and development ==
The Tenryu 10 was wooden-framed throughout, with fabric-covered wings and a plywood-covered fuselage. It was an equal span, two bay biplane with two spar, rectangular plan wings braced together without stagger by upright, parallel interplane struts. The lower wings were conventionally mounted on the lower fuselage longerons and the upper wing was held close to the top of the fuselage by short, angled struts from the upper longerons. Ailerons, fitted only on the lower wings, reached to the tips.

The fuselage was flat-sided and dominated ahead of the wing by the large, upright Fiat A.12 six cylinder, water-cooled inline engine. It was cooled by a radiator which filled the nose behind a two-bladed propeller. There was a windowed cabin for four passengers immediately behind the engine and between the wings and a side-by-side open cockpit well behind the trailing edges for the crew.

The Tenryu 10's tail was conventional, with a very broad, flat-topped fin with a rounded leading edge carrying a rectangular horn-balanced rudder. Aerodynamically balanced control surfaces were a novelty in Japan at the time. The tailplane, also straight-edged, was mounted on top of the fuselage and braced with parallel pairs of struts to the lower fuselage. Like the fin, the elevators were also balanced.

Its short, fixed undercarriage had mainwheels on a single axle, supported by faired V-struts, and a long tailskid.

== Operational history ==
Fukunaga had begun the design as an entrant to a prize-winning flight to Shanghai planned for the spring of 1921 but this was cancelled before the Tenryu 10 had been completed. It would have had large fuselage fuel tanks but instead their space was refitted as the four passenger cabin described above. It was completed in October 1922 as the largest Japanese aircraft and first flown on 26 October with Shiro and Goto Fukunaga at the controls. After certification in November it participated in an Osaka-Tokyo round trip airmail competition but dropped out with engine problems. In June 1923 it was entered into the duration category of the Fourth Prize-winning Flight Competition, held at Shimoshizu. The Tenryu 10's tankage was modified for this contest, with the standard 200 L (44 imp gal; 53 US gal) upper wing tanks replaced by a 500 L (110 imp gal; 130 US gal) cabin tank. Its only managed fourth place, with a time of 3 hr 48 min. The Tenryu's disappointing performance was blamed on sub-specification power from the Fiat engine.

The Tenryu 10 was the last Fukunaga aircraft though the company survived until 1936.

== Specifications ==
Data from Japanese Aircraft 1910-1941

General characteristics

- Crew: two
- Capacity: four passengers
- Length: 9.40 m (30 ft 10 in)
- Wingspan: 12.95 m (42 ft 6 in)
- Wing area: 37 m^{2} (400 sq ft)
- Empty weight: 1,100 kg (2,425 lb)
- Gross weight: 1,818 kg (4,008 lb)
- Fuel capacity: 200 L (44 imp gal; 53 US gal)
- Powerplant: 1 × Fiat A.12 water-cooled, inline six cylinder, 220 kW (300 hp)
- Propellers: 2-bladed wooden

Performance

- Maximum speed: 180 km/h (112 mph, 97 kn)
