= Ansaldo A.300 =

A.300
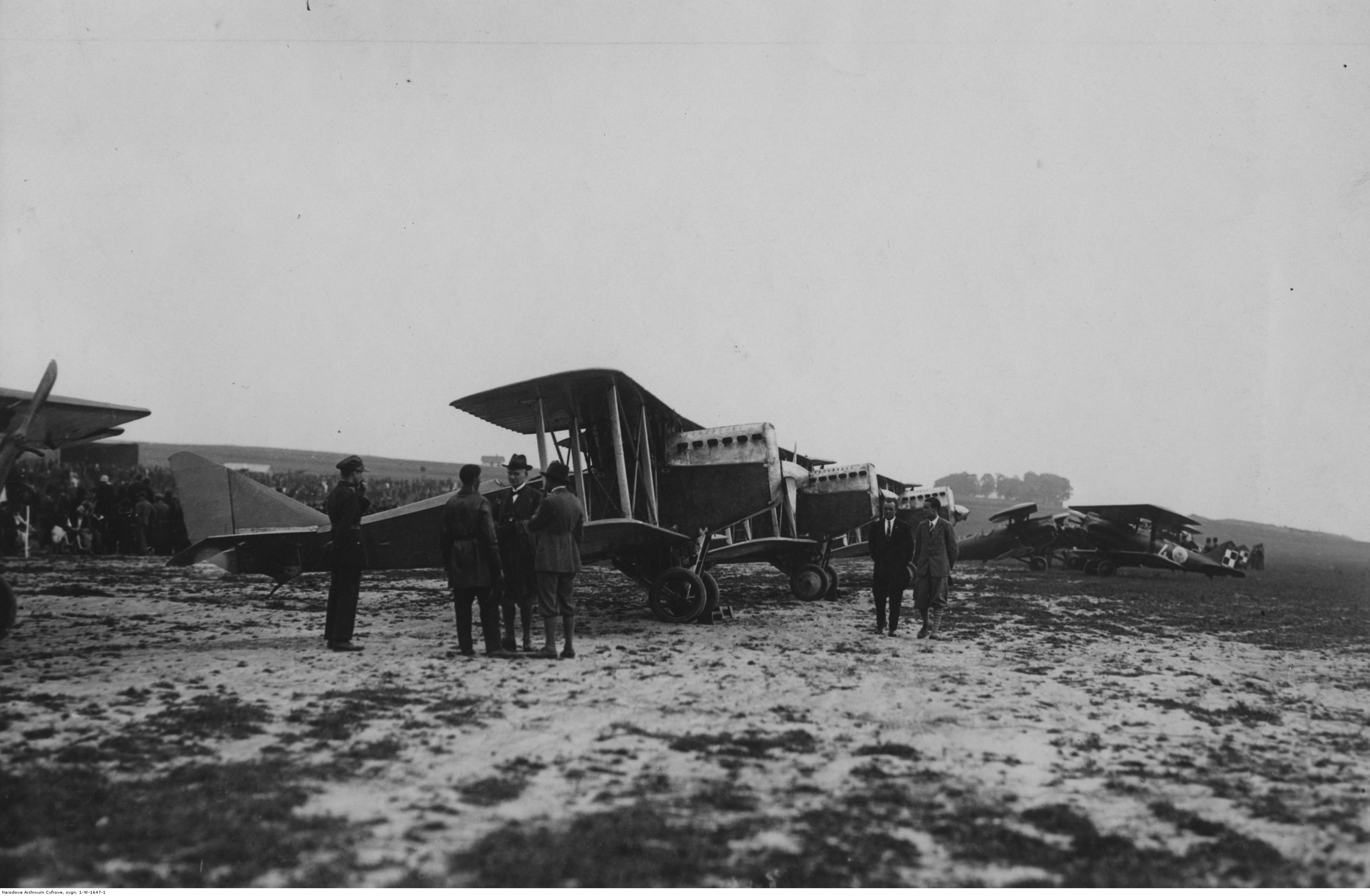

General information
- Type: Reconnaissance aircraft
- Manufacturer: Gio. Ansaldo & C.
- Number built: ~850

History
- First flight: 1919

The Ansaldo A.300 was an Italian general-purpose biplane aircraft built by the Ansaldo company (now part of FIAT) of Turin from 1920 to 1929. It also served as a light bomber, transport, fighter and reconnaissance aircraft, and finally as an advanced trainer, with examples in service as late as 1940. 50 examples were also license-built in Poland at ZM E. Plage & T. Laśkiewicz, but were not a success due to poor quality.

== Development ==
Based on Ansaldo's highly successful World War I Balilla and S.V.A scouts, the A.300 was a conventional single-engined two-bay open cockpit biplane of mixed metal and wood-and-fabric construction, powered usually by a water-cooled Fiat A.12bis V12 engine. Most variants had two fixed Vickers guns and one mobile gun mounted in the rear cockpit. For reconnaissance purposes, the plane could be equipped with a radio and a camera. It first flew in 1919.

Early examples were two seaters, but the A.300/3 was a three-seater intended for reconnaissance use, of which around 90 were delivered. The most significant variant was the A.300/4 which started full production in 1923, just as Ansaldo was absorbed into FIAT. This became the standard multi-role aircraft in the newly formed Regia Aeronautica and served in Italy, Sicily, Sardinia, Corfu, Libya and Eritrea.

== Operational history ==
The A.300 was one of the most numerous aircraft of its time, with the production run of the A.300/4 alone, at 700 units, exceeding the total production of any other type of the 1920s except the Breguet XIX and Potez 25. Despite this, and possibly because it was Italian rather than French or British, it remains one of the least documented contemporary types, certainly the most obscure produced in anything like these numbers.

== Variants ==
A.300/2
initial production version
A.300/3
three-seat version, also exported to Spain, Belgium, and Poland
A.300/4
definitive production version with improved cooling
A.300/5
prototype with Lorraine engine
A.300/6
improved A.300/4, also in service
A.300C
Four passenger airliner. Several built 1921-'26 and operated by the Belgian airline SNETA, French airlines SABENA and 1925 operated by the Romanian airlines SNNA, as regular flights with 5 aircraft.
A.300T
Eight passenger airliner. At least one built 1921.
A.400
prototype

== Operators ==
Belgium

- Belgian Air Force

Kingdom of Italy

- Corpo Aeronautico Militare

Poland

- Polish Air Force

Soviet Union

- Soviet Air Force

Turkey

- Türk Hava Kurumu (THK)

== Specifications (A.300/4) ==
General characteristics

- Crew: two, pilot and observer
- Length: 8.75 m (28 ft 9 in)
- Wingspan: 11.24 m (36 ft 11 in)
- Height: 2.97 m (9 ft 9 in)
- Wing area: 39.5 m^{2} (425 sq ft)
- Empty weight: 1,200 kg (2,650 lb)
- Gross weight: 1,700 kg (3,750 lb)
- Powerplant: 1 × Fiat A.12bis piston engine , 170 kW (230 hp)

Performance

- Maximum speed: 200 km/h (120 mph, 100 kn)
- Endurance: 3 hours 30 minutes
- Service ceiling: 5,500 m (18,000 ft)
- Rate of climb: 2.5 m/s (490 ft/min)

Armament

- 2 × fixed, forward-firing .303 Vickers machine guns
- 1 × flexible .303 Vickers machine gun for observer
- Up to 191 kg of light anti-personnel bombs

== See also ==
- Karolina Borchardt, the first Polish woman to earn a pilot's license, completed her first solo flight in an Ansaldo A.300 in 1928

== Bibliography ==
- Bourret, Alain (April 2001). "Courrier des Lecteurs" [Readers' Letters]. Avions: Toute l'Aéronautique et son histoire (in French) (97): 5. ISSN 1243-8650.
- Duwelz, Yves (December 1999). "L'Ansaldo A.300 en service dans l'Aéronautique Militaire belge" [The Ansaldo A.300 of the Belgian Air Force]. Avions: Toute l'Aéronautique et Son Histoire (in French) (80): 28–42. ISSN 1243-8650.
- Stroud, John (1966). European Transport Aircraft since 1910. London: Putnam.
- Taylor, John W. R. (1969). Combat Aircraft of the World: from 1909 to the present. New York: Parragon Books.
- Taylor, Michael J. H. (1989). Jane's Encyclopedia of Aviation. London: Studio Editions.
- Hirschauer, Louis; Dollfus, Charles, eds. (1920). L'Année Aéronautique: 1919-1920. Paris: Dunod. p. 43.
- Hirschauer, Louis; Dollfus, Charles, eds. (1921). L'Année Aéronautique: 1920-1921. Paris: Dunod. (p. 53 for 300/3, p. 55 for 300C)
- Wauthy, Jean-Luc & de Neve, Florian (June 1995). "Les aéronefs de la Force Aérienne Belge, deuxième partie 1919–1935" [Aircraft of the Belgian Air Force]. Le Fana de l'Aviation (in French) (305): 28–33. ISSN 0757-4169.
