= Corpo Aeronautico Militare =

Military Aviation Corps
- Corpo Aeronautico Militare
- Active: 1915–1923
- Disbanded: 1923
- Country: Kingdom of Italy
- Allegiance: Victor Emmanuel III
- Branch: Royal Italian Army
- Role: Air Force
- Size: 20,000 aircraft produced
- Engagements: World War I

Commanders
- Notable commanders: Maurizio Moris

Aircraft flown
- Attack: SPAD S.VII; SPAD S.XIII (91ª Squadriglia); Nieuport 11(Macchi); Nieuport 17; Hanriot HD.1(Macchi)
- Bomber: Caproni Ca.1
- Patrol: Macchi M.5
- Reconnaissance: Ansaldo SVA; Pomilio PE; SIA 7

The Italian Corpo Aeronautico Militare (Military Aviation Corps) was formed as part of the Regio Esercito (Royal Army) on 7 January 1915, incorporating the Aviators Flights Battalion (airplanes), the Specialists Battalion (airships) and the Ballonists Battalion. Prior to World War I, Italy had pioneered military aviation in the Italo-Turkish War during 1911–1912. Its army also contained one of the world's foremost theorists about the future of military aviation, Giulio Douhet; Douhet also had a practical side, as he was largely responsible for the development of Italy's Caproni bombers starting in 1913. Italy also had the advantage of a delayed entry into World War I, not starting the fight until 24 May 1915, but took no advantage of it so far as aviation was concerned.

Italy entered World War I with an air force technologically comparable to a force on the Western Front in 1914. Lacking fighter aircraft, throughout the war the Italians mostly resorted to airplanes supplied by the French either directly or built under license, though Italy did also design several planes that entered service in the late war period. The early air force was also woefully tactically deficient; basically, its fighter craft were scrambled into the air only when enemy planes were spotted overhead. However, the Caproni bombers developed to operational status, flying their first sorties on 20 August 1915.

After the war the Corpo Aeronautico Militare became the basis of the Regia Aeronautica, which became an air force independent of the Royal Italian Army on 28 March 1923.

== History ==
=== Before World War I ===
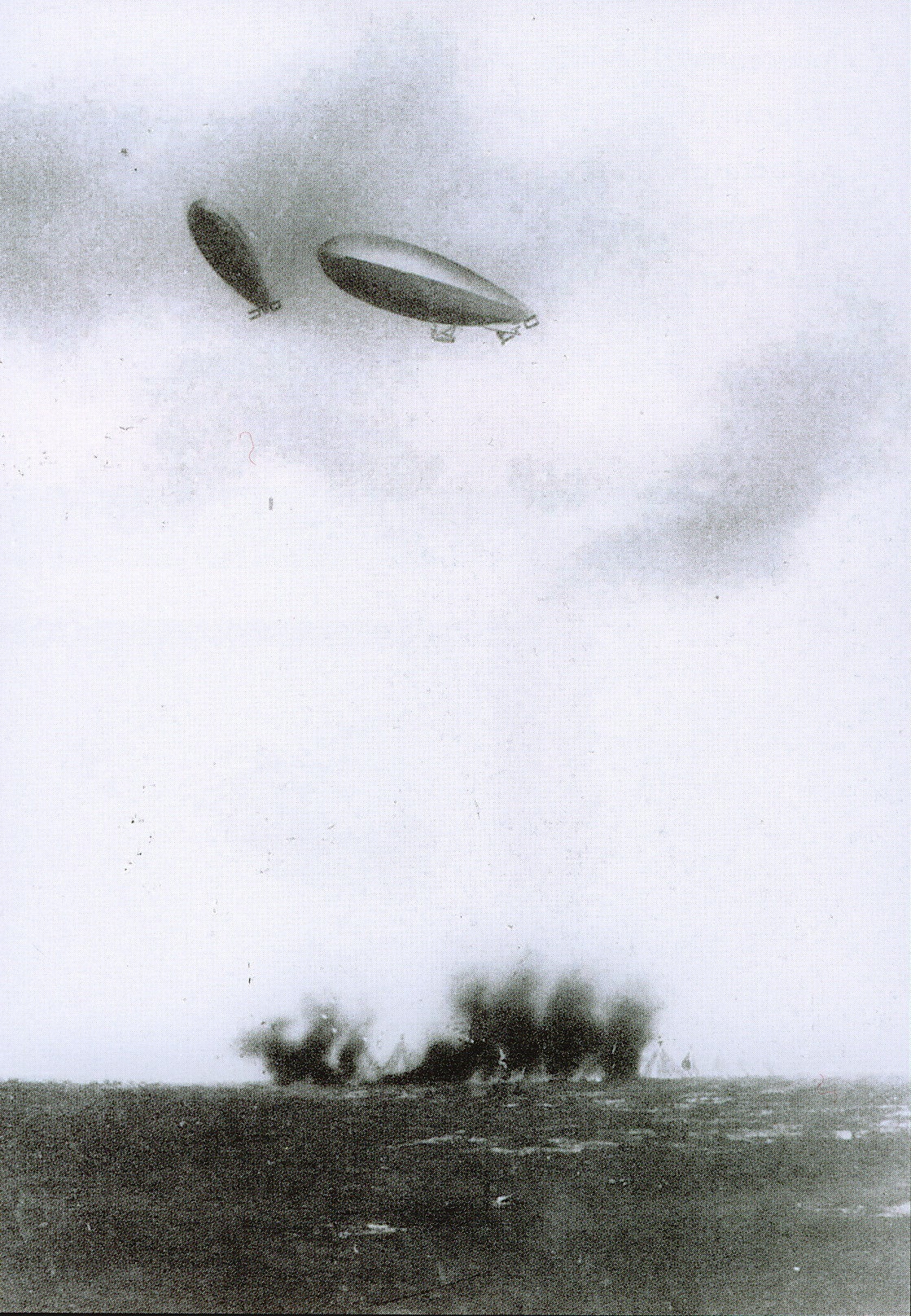
Italian dirigibles bomb Turkish positions on Libyan territory. The Italo-Turkish War was the first in history to feature aerial bombardment by airplanes and airships.

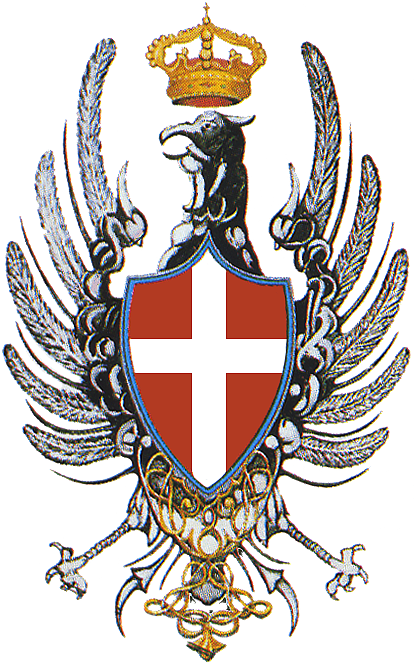

Italy was a pioneer in pre-World War I military aviation, using aircraft in Libya during the Italo-Turkish War in 1911. It also had one of military aviation's prophets within its army's ranks, in Giulio Douhet. In June 1911, even before the fighting began in Libya, Douhet predicted that the most effective opponent of military aircraft would be other aircraft. He also predicted the greater vulnerability to enemy action of lighter-than-air machines.

The Libyan flight experiment may have delivered only four small bombs, but the potential of air power was explicit enough that both the Regio Esercito and the Regia Marina established air units in 1912. The naval air unit was dubbed the Sezioni Idrovolanti (Seaplane Section). The army's Battaglione Aviatori (Aviation Battalion) for heavier-than-air craft was established on 27 June. On 28 November 1912, the two new units were collectively dubbed the Servizio Aeronautico Militare.

By September 1913, Douhet foresaw the future need for designing a single-seat plane with a forward-firing gun. Also in 1913, he ignored his superior officers' wishes and collaborated with Giovanni Battista Caproni in the design of Caproni's huge three-engined bomber. Douhet's superiors, unhappy with this, exiled him to an infantry assignment.

On 28 July 1914, as part of the chain reaction of events opening World War I, Austria declared war on Serbia and requested Italian help. Italy maintained its neutrality due to the Triple Alliance being a defensive pact. On 24 May 1915, Italy declared war on Austria to join World War I. As of May 1915, Italy still had no single-seat scouts with a forward-firing gun. It did have 86 airplanes and 70 pilots organized into 14 squadrons to start its war.

=== World War I ===
==== Italian aviation theaters of operation ====
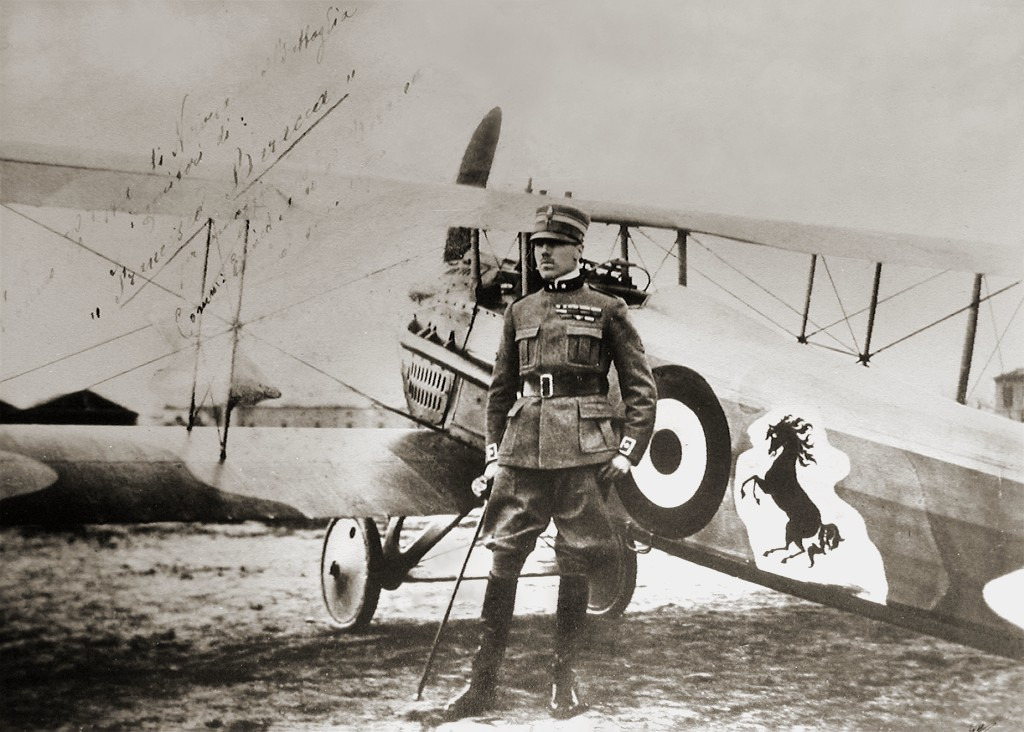
Francesco Baracca, Italy's top ace of WWI with 34 confirmed victories – posing in front of his SPAD S.XIII

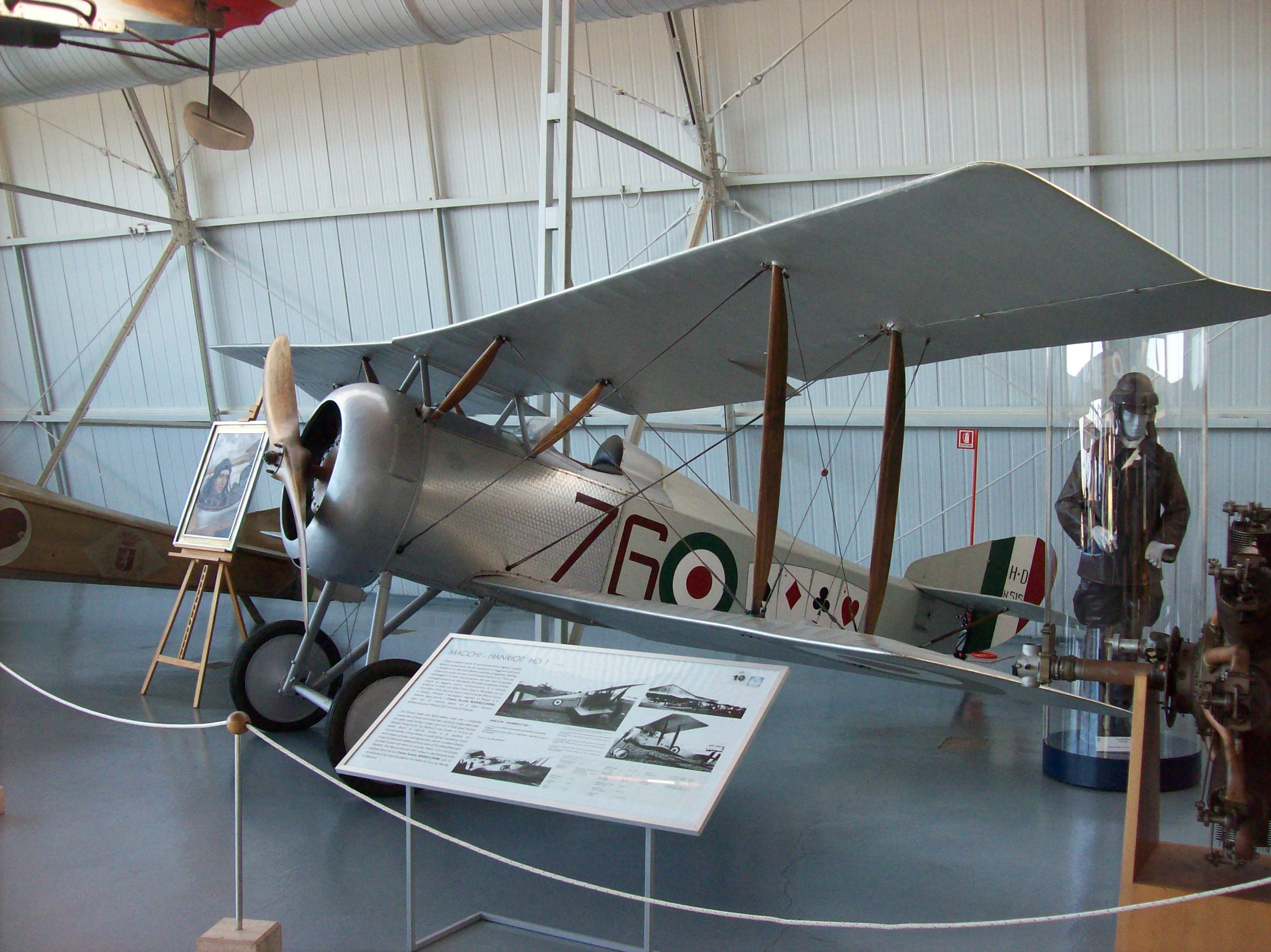
A Macchi/Hanriot HD.1; a hybrid French-Italian aircraft of WWI; the specimen on display was operated by the fighter ace Flavio Baracchini

The Corpo Aeronautico Militare (Military Aviation Corps) was formed as part of the part of the Regio Esercito (Royal Army) on 7 January 1915, incorporating the Aviators Flights Battalion (airplanes), the Specialists Battalion (airships) and the Balloonists Battalion. The Regia Marina (Royal Navy) still had an air arm, operating locally-built flying boats. Italy's aerial operations during World War I were split into three geographic areas. First was the Adriatic coast. Although aircraft of the time were short-ranged enough to make flights over the central Adriatic Sea difficult, they could operate over the south or north ends where the sea was narrower. As a unique result, both the Italians and their opposing Austro-Hungarian aviation developed the only theater of war that featured seaplane bombers and fighters.

The second area, an internal one, was that covered by home defense aviation units to protect Italian cities from aerial bombing. These home defense squadrons would prove to be of little military value. The last, and most active area, was northern Italy on the border, near and in the verge of the Alps, where Italian aircraft supported the Italian ground troops fighting along and near the Isonzo River in a series of 11 battles throughout the war. The climatic actions in this theater were the Battle of Caporetto, followed by the Battle of Vittorio Veneto.

==== Italy's air war begins ====
First attempts to organize and use Italian aircraft to fight the Austro-Hungarian aerial invaders were dismal. Italian pilots were equipped with Nieuport 10s and deployed in a "scramble" mode instead of standing patrols. They soon found that their French-made two-seaters could not take off and climb quickly enough to bring an invader to combat, even when burdened by only a pilot. The lack of a net of ground observers and aircraft spotters to give early warning only compounded the difficulties. By the end of 1915, Italian Nieuports had succeeded in attacking Austro-Hungarian airplanes on seven occasions. The Austro-Hungarians reported two losses for the year.

Also in 1915, the Caproni bomber came online to begin long distance bombing missions. Its first sortie, on 20 August 1915, was a raid on Aisovizza. This was the start of a series of tit-for-tat raids on enemy cities launched by both Italy and Austro-Hungary that would carry on through war's end.

On 18 February 1916, on a long-range raid to Ljubljana, Oreste Salomone earned the first aviation award of the Gold Medal for Military Valor for his valor. Six days later, the Austro-Hungarians hit Milan for their first bombing raid. This raid, as well as the ones that followed on other Italian cities and towns, provoked a considerable home defense effort by the Italians, who founded home defense squadrons to counter the attacks.

On 7 April 1916, the newly formed Italian fighter arm scored its first victories despite being handicapped by "scramble" tactics. Newly supplied Nieuport 11s, with their improved performance, made the difference. By May, in an attempt to replace casualties and expand its air force, 568 Italian pilots graduated from 20- to 24-week courses in the first five months of 1916. On 28 August 1916, Italy declared war on the German Empire. In August 1916 Italy began use of escort fighters accompanying its bombers to ward off Austro-Hungarian interceptors intent on foiling Italian bombing raids.

When the Battle of Asiago erupted on 14 May 1916 in an Austro-Hungarian attempt to attack the rear of the Isonzo Front, Italian air assets aided the Italian army in countering the attack. Italian aviation had a significant effect on the course of fighting on Mount Ortigara; its 61 bombers dropped 5.5 tons of bombs on Austro-Hungarian troops. The 84 escorts for this mission found little opposition, as the Austro-Hungarians could muster only three single-seat fighters and 23 two-seater reconnaissance craft against them.

By September 1916 Italian air assets came to 42 squadrons crewed by 369 pilots (140 officers, 229 enlisted), 162 observers, and 123 gunners. By the end of 1916, Italians fliers were credited with 56 aerial victories for the year

==== The Battle of Caporetto ====
The ongoing stalemate of the Battles of the Isonzo drew more and more of Italy's military forces northward to repel the invaders. By August 1917, the Italians could muster over 200 operational aircraft on its northern front on any given day. Their pressure on the invaders was considerable. In the early hours of 24 October 1917, the Austro-Hungarians having been supplemented by German troops, launched a devastating attack on the Italian lines centered on the Caporetto Valley. Shattered by the first use of poison gas on the Italian front and flung back by the ferocious assaults, Italian troops withdrew to the Piave River to establish a new defense line. Italian fighter aircraft flew several daily sorties apiece in support of their own troops during this battle. Demand for close air support was so insistent that the massive Caproni strategic bombers were diverted to the task. Naval seaplanes were even called in overland in support missions.

After the Battle of Caporetto, Italian aviation had dwindled to 59 squadrons containing 378 aircraft, with slightly more than 100 fighters. For aircrew, it could muster 497 pilots, 284 observers, and 152 gunners. It had also lost the use of 22 airfields, as well as other infrastructure that had fallen into Austro-German hands. The net effect of Caporetto was to set the Italian air effort back some one to two years. The Italian Air Force officially scored 170 aerial victories for 1917, in 700 combats.

==== The final offensives ====
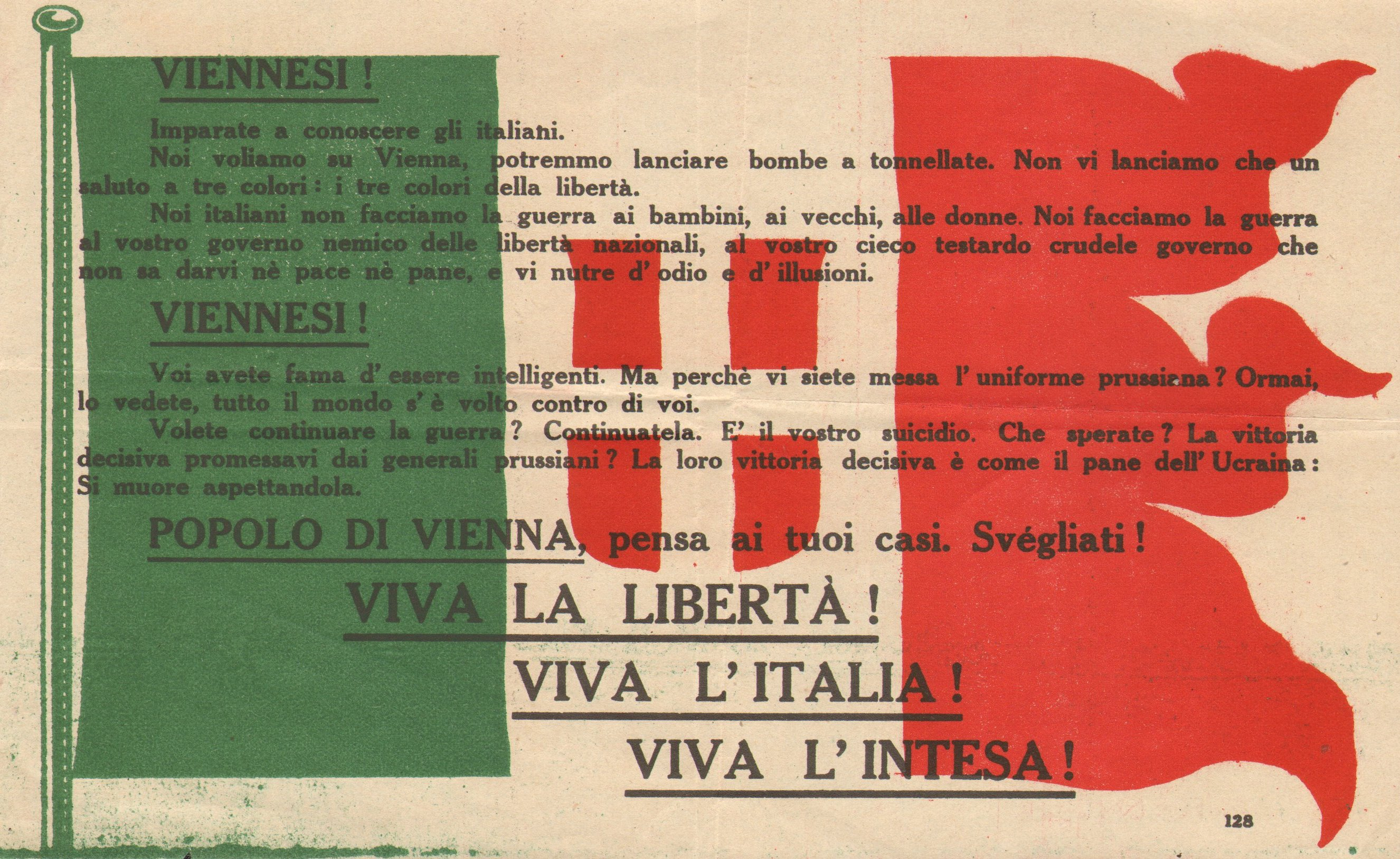
Italian propaganda leaflet that Italian poet Gabriele d'Annunzio threw from his (Ansaldo SVA) airplane during his Flight over Vienna

The two armies in northern Italy lapsed into an exhausted pause until June 1918. During this pause, as part of the rebuilding process, the Italian Army accumulated both a "bomber mass" and a "fighter mass" to concentrate the power of its air force. On the 15th, the Austro-Hungarians along the Piave River launched their last offensive, which shortly fizzled. As usual, heavier ground fighting brought on increased air activity. Victory claims by Italian aviation were almost double that of its opponent. Although the Austro-Hungarians claimed victory over two Italian observation balloons and 43 airplanes, in turn, Italy claimed 72 airplanes and five balloons shot down. On the individual level, however, Italy had suffered greatly, as she lost the services of her leading ace, Francesco Baracca, as well as leading aces Flavio Baracchini and Silvio Scaroni.

On 24 October 1918, the Italians launched their final offensive, the Battle of Vittorio Veneto. Their ground troops were supported by a mass of 400 aircraft; though some were British or French, the majority were Italian. Within three days, the Austro-Hungarian military began to dissolve. The fighting on the front ended on 3 November 1918. The Corpo Aeronautico Militare would be credited with 633 victories during World War I. Although it had not gone to the extreme offensive tactics of the Royal Air Force, it had achieved air superiority and vanquished its foe.

==== Foreign augmentation ====
Early in the war, French aircraft had been brought in to defend Venice from air attack. In the wake of the Battle of Caporetto, four squadrons of the British Royal Flying Corps were dispatched to Italy to supplement the Italian aviation effort. Unbeknownst to either Italians or British, the Austro-Hungarians were beginning to suffer shortages of vital war materials on the home front; as a result, their aviation activities were seriously curtailed for the Winter of 1917. However, the RFC squadrons would claim 550 victories for their year in Italy.

In turn, the German Empire reinforced its laggard allies the Austro-Hungarians with air assets; however, they were also relatively inactive over the Winter of 1917–1918.

==== Aircraft used ====
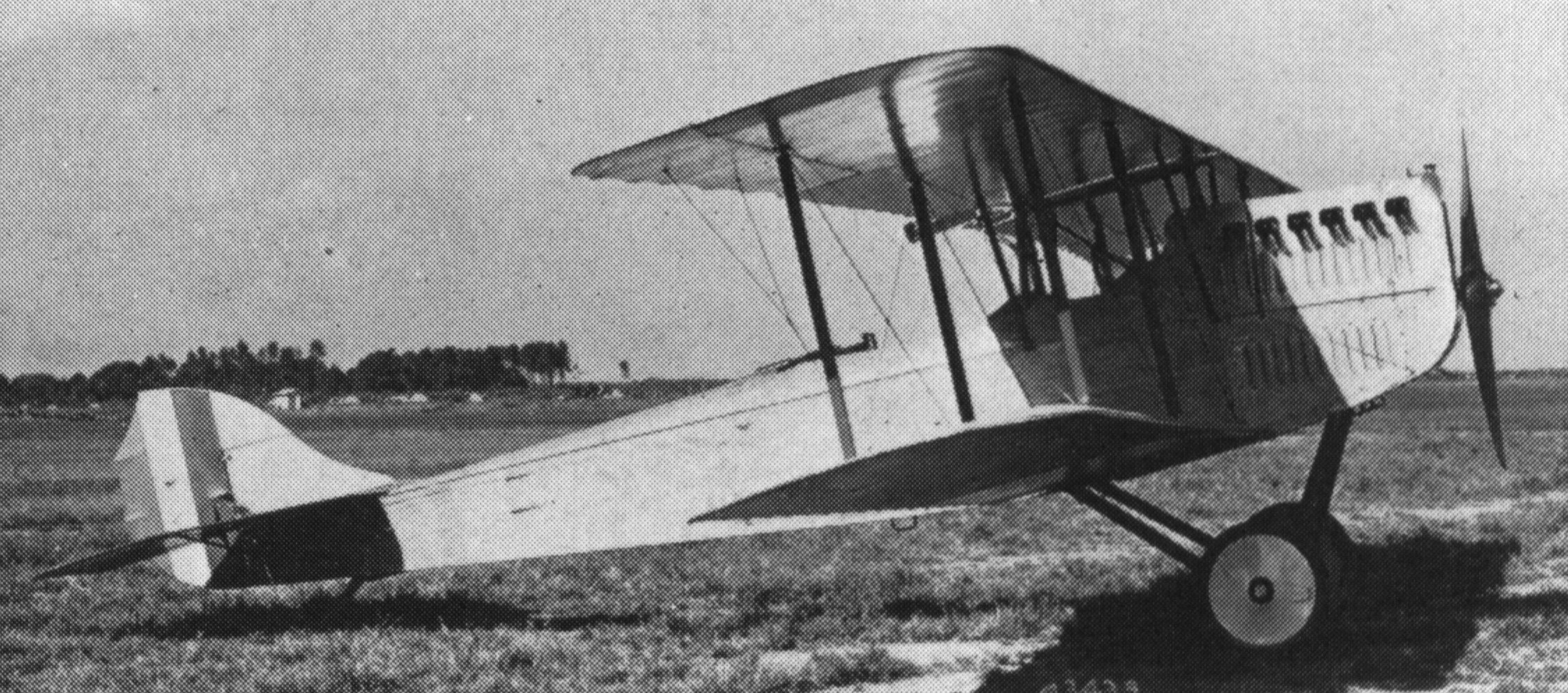
SIA 7B

Italy produced 12,000 aircraft during the course of the war–this despite an economy that was based on agriculture rather than technology. However, much of this production capacity was used on the less than mediocre development of the SIA 7. Italian army fighter pilots mostly found themselves flying either French Spad VIIs, Spad XIIIs, or Nieuports, or Macchi's knockoffs of Nieuports. While the SIA 7 did prove a decent bomber during the Caporetto to early 1918 period, its bad takeoff and landing performance made it prone to crashes, failure of the multi-purpose SIA 7 also left some Italian pilots flying obsolescent Farman and Voisin reconnaissance craft well into 1918, and paying the price in blood. Italian naval aviators, however, were supplied with seaplane fighters by Macchi, such as the M.5 or the M.7, that were the equals of landbound fighters. The SIA 7 continued being developed tough, which resulted in the SIA 9, one of the best single engine bombers of the war.

Before mid-1918, the most successful Italian single-engine designs were the Pomilio armed scout planes, like the Pomilio PE, which were important in slowing down the central powers' advances after Caporetto.

Italy did better with producing larger aircraft. The Caproni was already in production even before World War I, and had such a progressive design that it would serve for the war's duration. Macchi's copies of an Austro-Hungarian Lohner flying boat captured on 24 May 1915 meant the Lohner design served both Austria-Hungary and Italy for the length of the war.

Italy in the late war period also designed a very successful light bomber and scout, the Ansaldo SVA, which gave the Italians the fastest plane in the theater that also doubled as a scout plane, it gave pivotal updates on enemy positions to Italian artillery in the Second Battle of The Piave in 1918, with more than 1200 built in less than a year it also was the most produced Italian design of the war.

=== List of aircraft used ===
- Ansaldo A.1 Balilla
- Ansaldo SVA
- Aviatik B.I
- Blériot XI
- Bristol Coanda Monoplanes
- Caproni Ca.2
- Caproni Ca.3
- Caproni Ca.4
- Caproni Ca.5
- Caproni Ca.18
- Caproni Ca.32
- Caproni Ca.36
- Caproni Ca.40
- Caproni Ca.44
- Caudron G.3
- Caudron G.4
- Etrich Taube
- Farman III
- Farman F.40
- Farman HF.20
- Farman MF.7
- Farman MF.11
- FBA Type H
- Fiat B.R.
- Fiat R.2
- Hanriot HD.1
- Macchi M.5
- Macchi M.6
- Macchi M.9
- Macchi M.14
- Marchetti MVT
- Nieuport 10
- Nieuport 11
- Nieuport 17
- Nieuport 23
- Nieuport 27
- Nieuport IV
- Nieuport-Delage NiD.29
- Pomilio Gamma
- Pomilio PE
- Savoia-Pomilio SP.2
- Savoia-Pomilio SP.3
- Savoia-Pomilio SP.4
- SIA 7
- SIA 9
- SIAI S.9
- SIAI S.12
- SPAD S.XI
- SPAD S.VII
- SPAD S.XIII
- Tebaldi-Zari
- Voisin III

=== Aerial victory summary for Italians and allies on the Italian Front ===
Year	Nationality	Victories claimed	Notes
1916	Italy	56 victories	
1917	Italy	170 victories	
1918	Italy, Britain, France	647 victories	Total for squadrons of all three nationalities
For entire war	Britain	550 victories	Includes any November 1917 victories
For entire war	Italy	643 victories	

== Post World War I ==
The Corpo Aeronautico Militare became the basis of the Regia Aeronautica, which became an air force independent of the Italian Army on 28 March 1923.

== Notable squadrons ==
- 70a Squadriglia
- 71a Squadriglia
- 76a Squadriglia
- 77a Squadriglia
- 78a Squadriglia
- 79a Squadriglia
- 80a Squadriglia
- 81a Squadriglia
- 91a Squadriglia: The "squadron of aces"
- 260a Squadriglia
