= Fiat A.14 =

1910s Italian piston aircraft engine

A.14
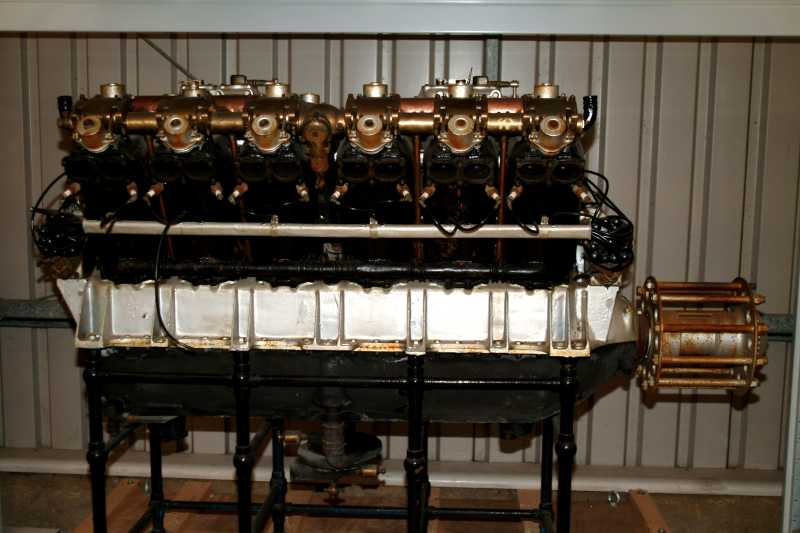
- Preserved Fiat A.14 engine
- Type: Piston engine
- Manufacturer: Fiat
- First run: 1917
- Number built: 500

The Fiat A.14 was an Italian V12, liquid-cooled, aero engine of World War I. The A.14 held the distinction at the end of World War I of being the largest and most powerful aircraft engine in the world. First produced in 1917, 500 were built by the end of the war.

== Applications ==
- Fiat BR.1
- Macchi M.19
- SIA.9

== Specifications (Fiat A.14) ==
Data from World Encyclopaedia of Aero Engines

=== General characteristics ===
- Type: V12 water-cooled piston engine
- Bore: 170 mm (6.69 in)
- Stroke: 210 mm (8.26 in)
- Displacement: 57.2 L (3,490.5 cu in)
- Length: 2,090 mm (82.28 in)
- Width: 900 mm (35.43 in)
- Height: 990 mm (39 in)
- Dry weight: 800 kg (1,763 lb)

=== Components ===
- Fuel system: Carburetor
- Cooling system: water-cooled

=== Performance ===
- Power output: 725 hp

== See also ==
Related lists

- List of aircraft engines
