= Pomilio PE =

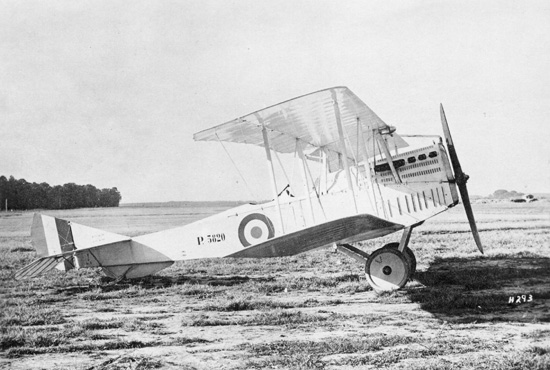

General information
- Type: Two-seat armed reconnaissance biplane
- Manufacturer: Pomilio
- Primary user: Corpo Aeronautico Militare; Regia Aeronautica
- Number built: 545 (PC and PD); 1071 (PE)

History
- Introduction date: 1917
- First flight: 1917
- Retired: 1920

The Pomilio PE was a First World War Italian armed reconnaissance biplane designed and built by the Pomilio brothers. It was developed from the earlier Pomilio PC and PD.

== Development ==
The Pomilio brothers first armed reconnaissance biplane was the Pomilio PC which appeared in 1917. It was a conventional biplane of mixed construction with a fixed tailskid landing gear. It had two open cockpits in tandem and was powered by a nose-mounted 260 hp (194 kW) Fiat A.12 engine. It first entered service in 1917 and was found to dangerously unstable which led to an improved design the Pomilio PD. Only some 70 Pomilio PC were made for Italian Air Force. Apart from other improvements, the PD introduced a tail fin and a ventral fin to help with the stability. The cylinder heads were exposed, and a radiator was placed in front of an upper wing. The PD was flown in June 1917. 431 PD were manufactured, including 93 dual control trainers, which were needed due to difficult flight characteristics.

A further improvement was the Pomilio PE, fitted with a more powerful variant of the Fiat A.12bis. It had a fully cowled engine, with a vertical radiator in front of it, what changed the plane's appearance. On later machines, a triangular fin was replaced with a bigger trapezoid one. It entered production in October 1917, and 984 were made, including 103 trainers. Changes were made throughout the production run with later aircraft fitted with synchronized forward-firing machine-guns as well as observer's Lewis gun.

== Variants ==
Pomilio PC
Initial production variant
Pomilio PD
Modified production variant with new tail unit and ventral fin, 575 PC and PDs built.
Pomilio PE
Improved production variant with more powerful fully cowled engine, 984 built.

== Operators ==
Kingdom of Italy

- Corpo Aeronautico Militare
- Regia Aeronautica

== Specifications (PE) ==
Data from The Illustrated Encyclopedia of Aircraft (Part Work 1982-1985). Orbis Publishing. p. 2759.

General characteristics

- Crew: 2 (pilot, observer)
- Length: 8.95 m (29 ft 4.25 in)
- Wingspan: 11.80 m (38 ft 8.5 in)
- Height: 3.35 m (11 ft 0 in)
- Gross weight: 1,535 kg (3,384 lb)
- Powerplant: 1 × Fiat A.12bis six-cylinder inline piston engine , 224 kW (300 hp)

Performance

- Maximum speed: 195 km/h (121 mph, 105 kn)
- Endurance: 3 hours 30 minutes
- Service ceiling: 5,000 m (16,405 ft)

Armament

- 1 x forward-firing 6.5 mm Fiat-Revelli machine-gun above the upper wing
- 1 x 6.5 mm Fiat-Revelli machine-gun, rarely 1 or 2 x 7.7 mm (0.303 in) Lewis machine-gun on Scarff ring in rear cockpit
- Three bombs

== Bibliography ==
- Taylor, Michael J. H. (1989). Jane's Encyclopedia of Aviation. London: Studio Editions.
- The Illustrated Encyclopedia of Aircraft (Part Work 1982-1985). Orbis Publishing. p. 2759.
- Alegi, Gregory (2006). Pomilio PD/PE. Windsock Datafile. Vol. 117. Berkhamsted: Albatros Productions. ISBN 1-902207-83-1.
