= SIA 7 =

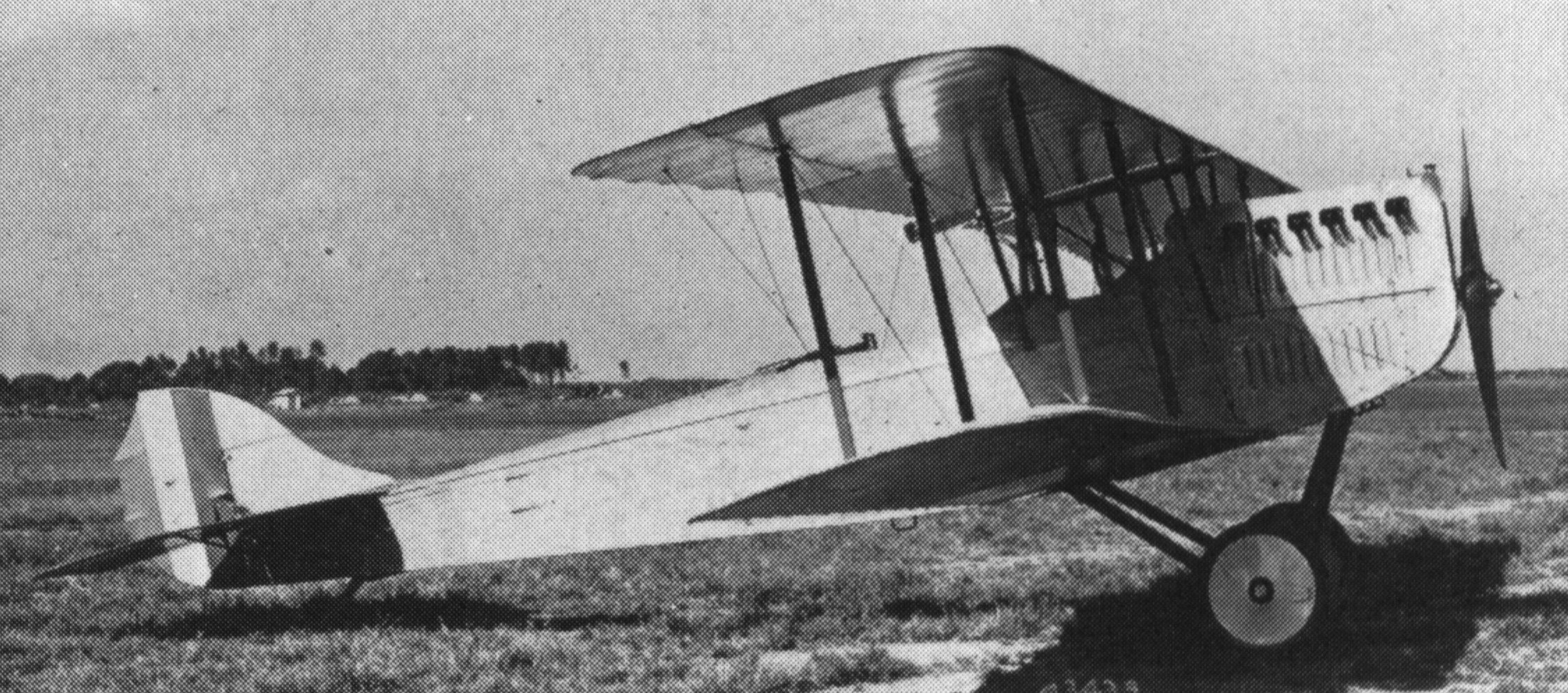
- S.I.A. 7B

General information
- Type: Reconnaissance-bomber
- National origin: Italy
- Manufacturer: Società Italiana Aviazione
- Designer: Torretta and Carlo Maurilio Lerici
- Primary users: Corpo Aeronautico Militare American Expeditionary Force
- Number built: 572

History
- Introduction date: 1917
- First flight: Summer 1917

The SIA 7B was a biplane reconnaissance-bomber built by the Società Italiana Aviazione and served with the Italian Corpo Aeronautico Militare and American Expeditionary Force in 1917.

== Development ==
The engineers, Torretta and Carlo Maurilio Lerici of the Fiat company, designed the airplane as a "Jack of all trades", its speed, climbing power, and carrying capacity enabled it to be used as a bomber and racer. It was built in the workshops of the Societa Italiano Aviazione, a sister company to the famous motor-car firm F.I.A.T. of Turin. It used the standard Italian structural feature of a plywood-covered fuselage.

The SIA.7B was accepted for the Italian Air Force in November 1917 and entered mass production. There were however revealed shortcomings, like low wing structure durability and poor view. Next variant SIA.7B2, developed in December 1917, had strengthened wings, slightly raised cockpits and stronger engine. Another variant, built in February 1918, was the SIA 9 with stronger 700 hp engine. There were built 501 SIA.7B, 71 SIA.7B2 and 62 SIA.9B.

== Operational history ==
The SIA.7 family aircraft were used for reconnaissance and bombing raids on Austro-Italian front. The SIA.7B2 entered service in March 1918. The SIA.9 managed to take part in World War I service as well. Because of unsatisfactory durability, from July 1918 SIA.7B and 7В2 were moved to training units.

In 1917, the Italian government sent a pair of SIA 7B-1 aircraft to the United States for evaluation under a plan to mass-produce established European designs. The 7B-1 was not put into production in the US but 19 were bought in Italy for use by A.E.F. units sent there.

== Variants ==
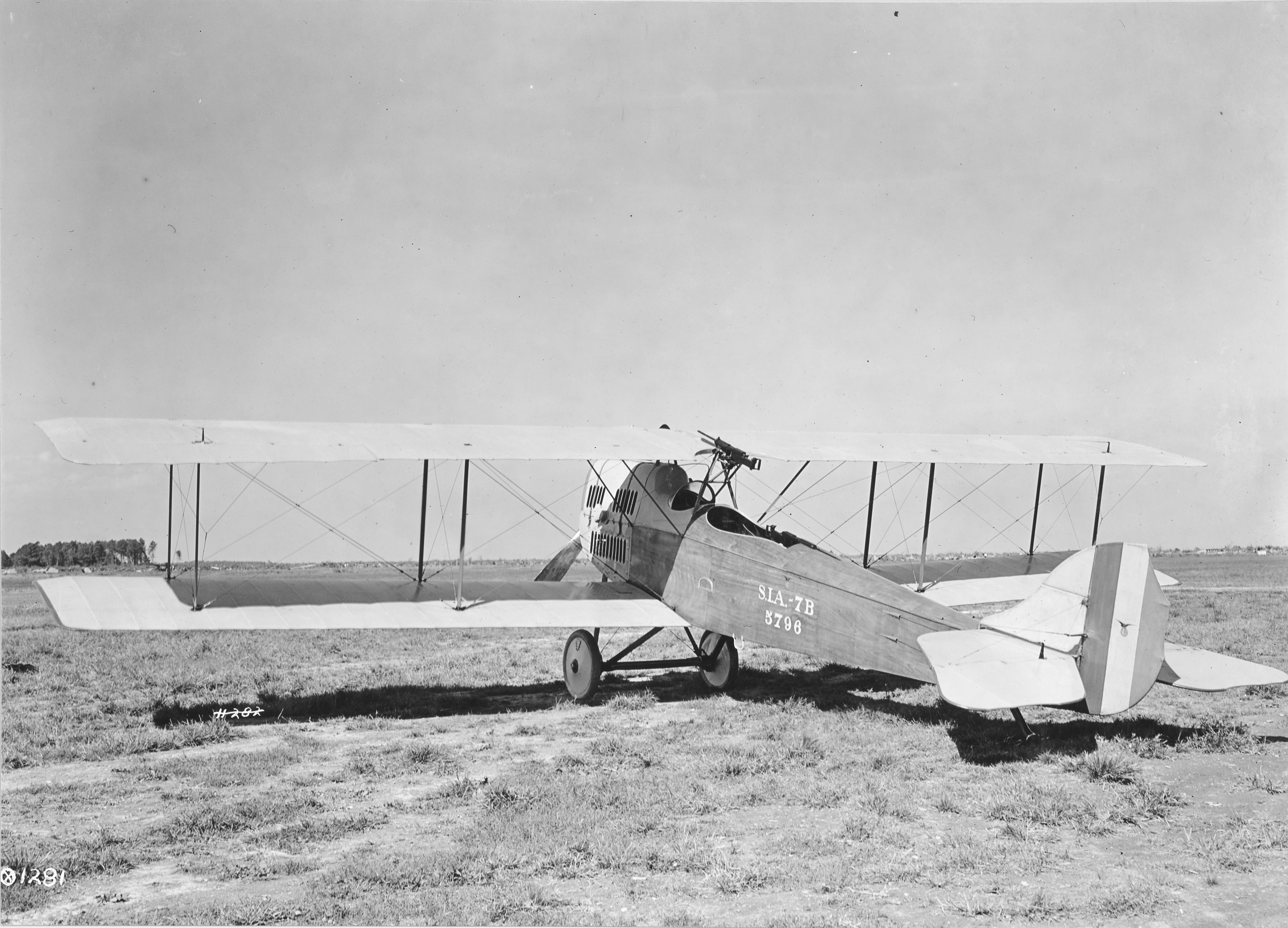
SIA 7B in the United States.

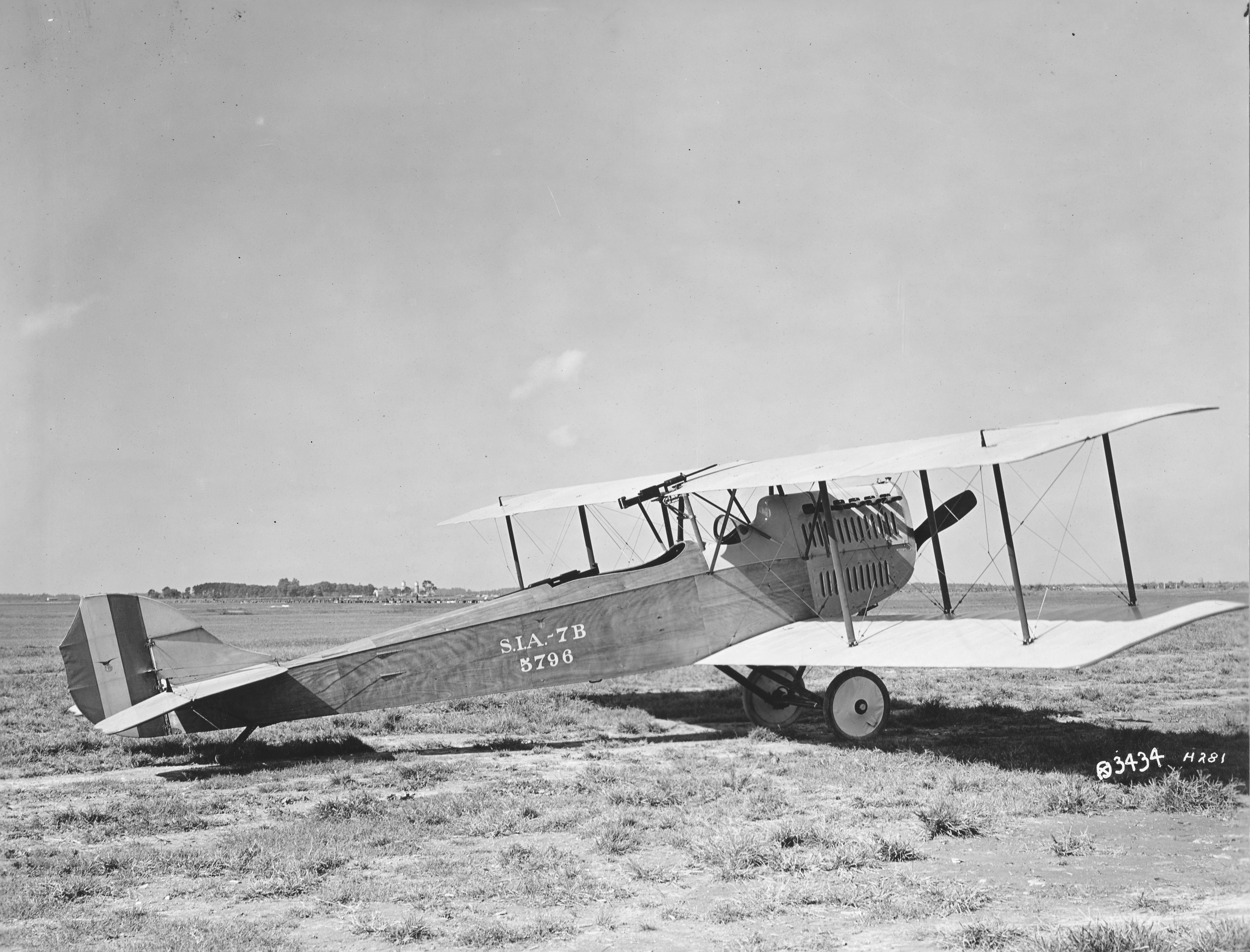
SIA 7B in the United States.

SIA 7B1
main reconnaissance-bomber variant
SIA 7B2
improved reconnaissance-bomber variant
SIA R2
scout-bomber built in 1918, span 12.32 m (40 ft 5 in), length 8.75 M (28 ft 8 in), height 3.3 m (120 ft 10 in), speed 180 km/h (111.8 mph)
SIA 9B
two-seat reconnaissance-bomber 700 hp (522 kW) Fiat A.14 engine

== Operators ==
Kingdom of Italy

- Corpo Aeronautico Militare

United States

- American Expeditionary Forces received 19 7B-1 in February 1917, used at Foggia, Italy.

== Specifications (7B) ==
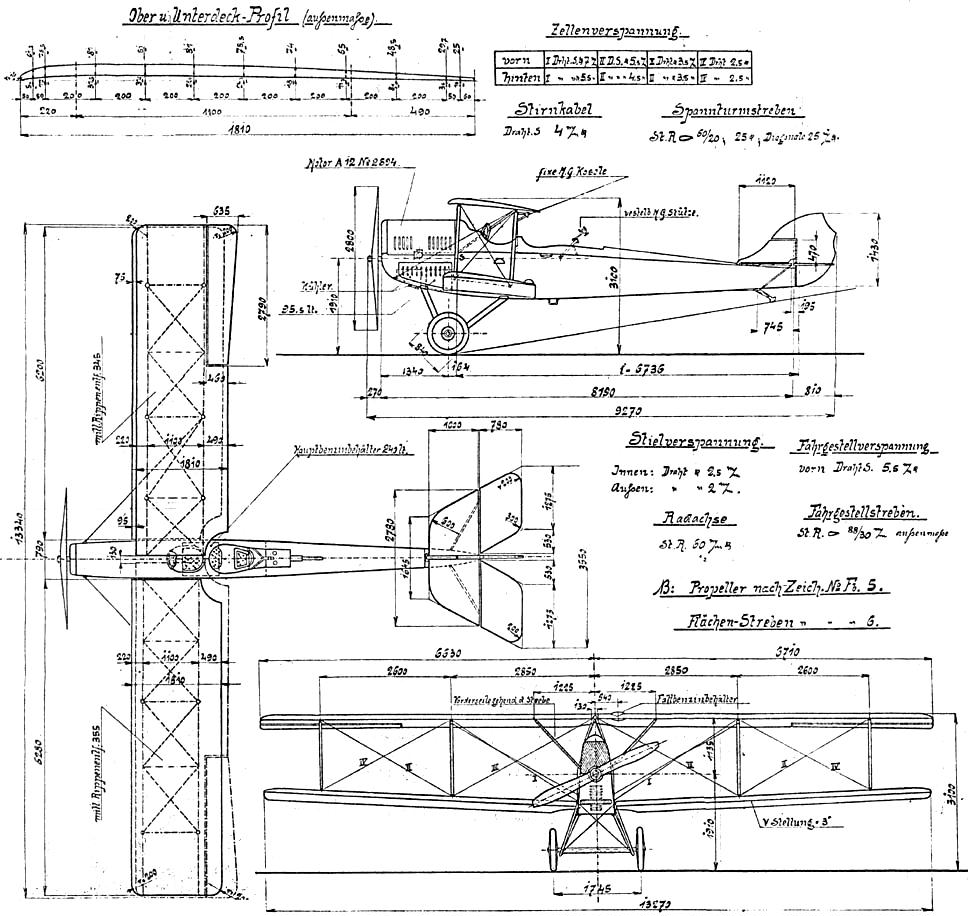
SIA 7B drawing

Data from Jane's Fighting Aircraft of World War I

General characteristics

- Crew: 2
- Length: 8.75 m (28 ft 8 in)
- Wingspan: 12.32 m (40 ft 5 in)
- Height: 3.3 m (10 ft 10 in)
- Wing area: 45.6 m^{2} (491 sq ft)
- Gross weight: 1,670 kg (3,682 lb)
- Fuel capacity: 215 kg (474 lb) (307 L (81 US gal; 68 imp gal) at Specific Gravity of 0.7)
- Powerplant: 1 × Fiat A.12bis 6-cylinder water-cooled in-line piston engine, 220 kW (300 hp)
- Propellers: 2-bladed fixed-pitch wooden propeller, 2.8 m (9 ft 2 in) diameter 1.85 m (6 ft 1 in) pitch at 1,500 rpm

Performance

- Maximum speed: 180 km/h (110 mph, 97 kn) at 200 m (660 ft)

165 km/h (103 mph; 89 kn) at 2,000 m (6,600 ft)

- Landing speed: 75 km/h (47 mph; 40 kn)
- Endurance: 4-6 hours
- Rate of climb: 1.24 m/s (244 ft/min)
- Time to altitude:

1,000 m (3,300 ft) in 6 minutes
2,000 m (6,600 ft) in 14 minutes
3,000 m (9,800 ft) in 23 minutes
4,000 m (13,000 ft) in 38 minutes

- Wing loading: 36.7 kg/m^{2} (7.5 lb/sq ft)
- Power/mass: 0.134 kW/kg (0.082 hp/lb)

Armament

- Guns: 1x 6.5 mm (0.256 in) Fiat–Revelli Modello 1914 machine gun on a flexible mount in the rear cockpit
- Bombs: 60 kg (132 lb) bombs

== See also ==
- List of military aircraft of the United States
