= SIA 9 =

SIA.9
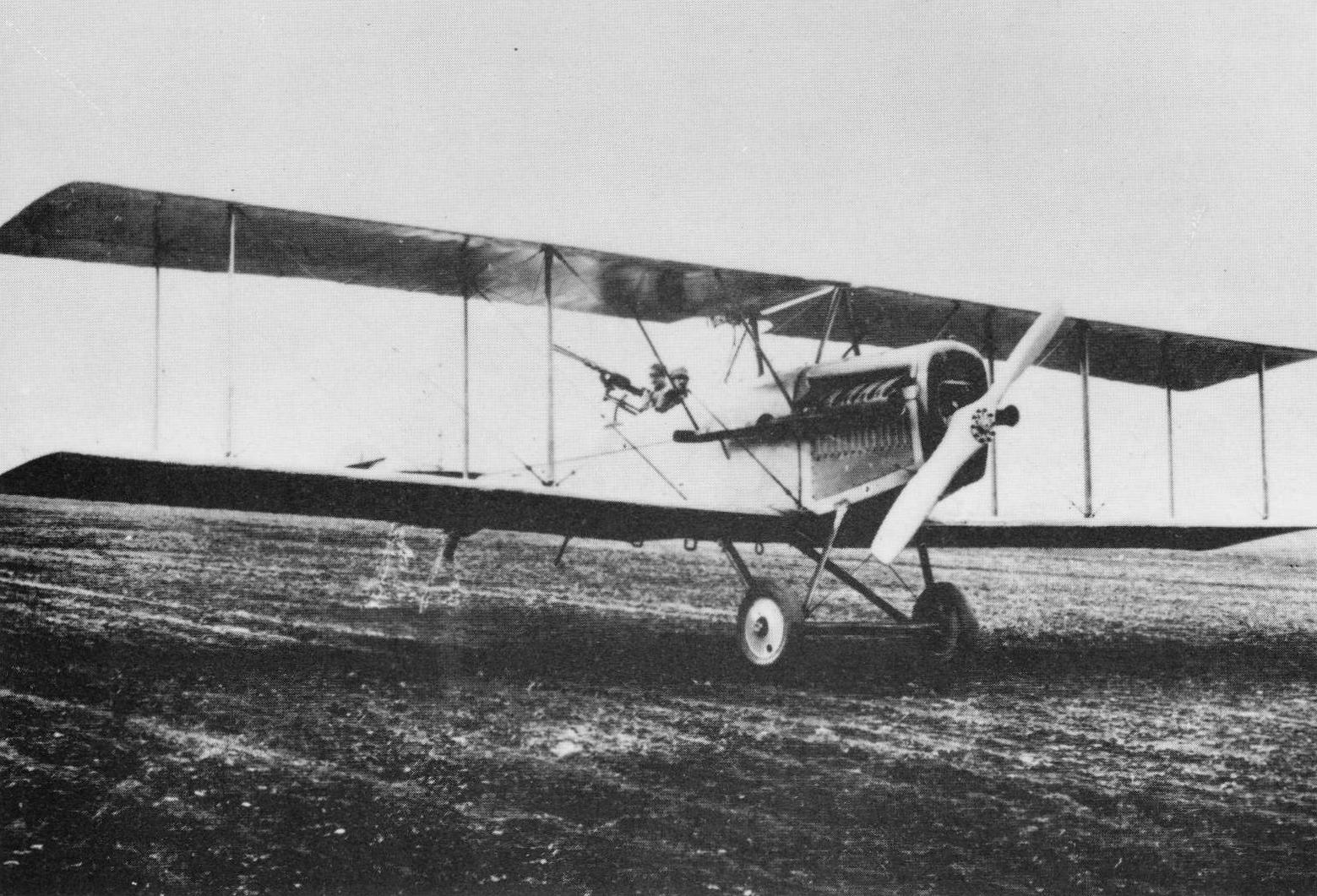

General information
- Type: reconnaissance-bomber
- National origin: Italy
- Manufacturer: Società Italiana Aviazione
- Primary user: Regia Marina
- Number built: 191

History
- Retired: 1925
- Developed from: SIA 7

The SIA.9 was an Italian reconnaissance-bomber built by Società Italiana Aviazione, a division of Fiat.

== Development ==
The 9B began as the SIA.7B2 fitted with a much larger engine, the 521 kW (699 hp) Fiat A.14. The larger engine increased the aircraft's speed, but also its weight, resulting in only an overall slight increase in maximum speed.

The Italian Navy ordered 200, and received 62 by the end of World War I.

Fiat dropped its SIA name, and manufactured another 129 aircraft under the designation Fiat R.2. These aircraft served until 1925.

== Operators ==
Kingdom of Italy

- Regia Marina

== Specifications ==
Data from Jane's Encyclopaedia of Aviation

General characteristics

- Crew: 2
- Length: 9.7 m (31 ft 10 in)
- Wingspan: 15.5 m (50 ft 10 in)
- Gross weight: 1,900 kg (4,189 lb)
- Powerplant: 1 × Fiat A.14 V-12 water-cooled piston engine, 521 kW (699 hp)

Performance

- Maximum speed: 205 km/h (127 mph, 111 kn)
- Range: 600 km (370 mi, 320 nmi)
