= Fiat A.12 =

1910s Italian piston aircraft engine

A.12
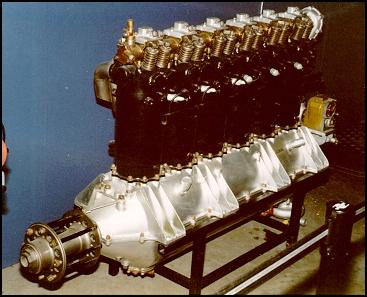
- Preserved Fiat A.12 engine
- Type: Piston engine
- Manufacturer: Fiat
- Number built: 13,260
- Developed from: Fiat A.10

The Fiat A.12 was a six-cylinder liquid-cooled in-line engine with a bore of 160 mm and a stroke of 180 mm, giving a capacity of just under 22 litres, with variants producing between 245 and 300 hp (183 and 224 kW) at 1,700 rpm. The A.12 was a rather large aero engine at the time, but it was efficient and reliable. A total of 13,260 A.12s were produced between 1916 and 1919.

== Variants ==
A.12
A.12bis

== Applications ==
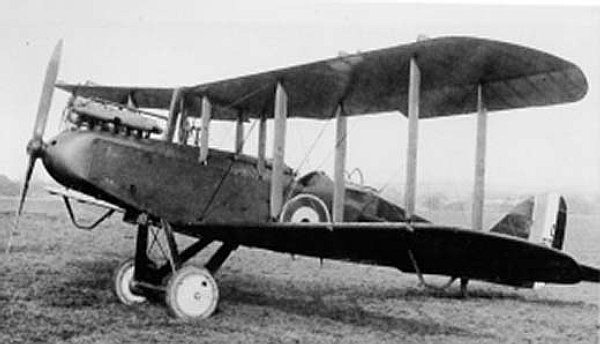
Airco DH.9

- Airco DH.4
- Airco DH.9
- Ansaldo A.300
- Breguet 14
- Caproni Ca.4
- Caproni Ca.5
- Caproni Ca.46
- Fiat 2000 (tank)
- Fiat Mephistopheles (racing car)
- Fiat R.2
- Fukunaga Tenryu 10
- IVL A.22 Hansa
- Macchi M.9
- Macchi M.15
- NS class airships
- Pomilio PC/PD/PE
- SAML S.1/S.2
- Savoia-Marchetti S.55
- Savoia-Pomilio SP.2
- Savoia-Pomilio SP.3
- SIA 7
- SIA 9
- SIAI S.16
- Vickers Vimy (third prototype)

== Engines on display ==
- There is a Fiat A.12 on display at the New England Air Museum, Bradley International Airport, Windsor Locks, CT.
- The National Military Museum, Romania shows the A.12 with serial number 7395.
- The National Museum of the United States Air Force possesses an example that is sometimes on display.

== Specifications (A.12) ==
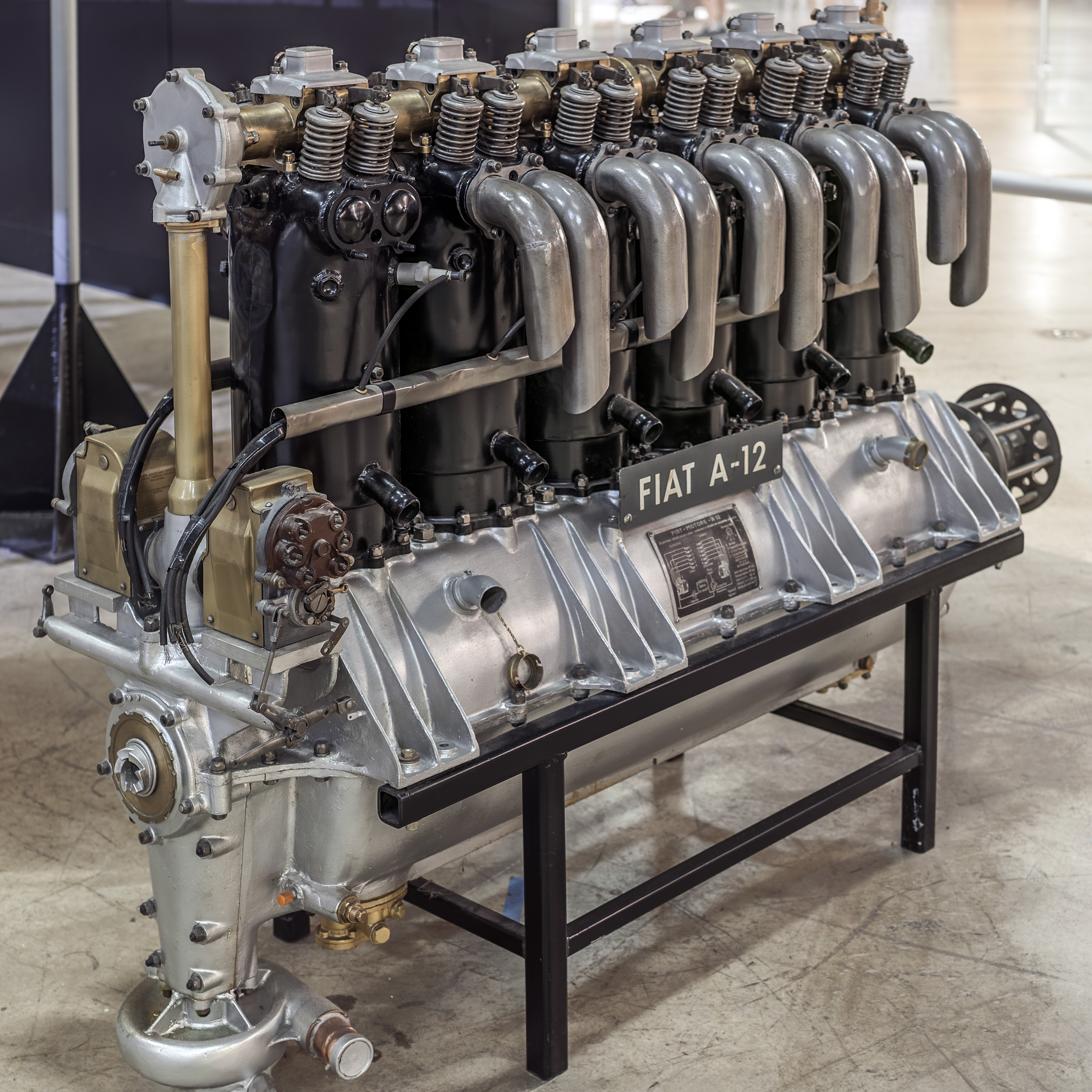
Fiat A.12 ("A-12") in-line six cylinder aircraft engine on display at the National Museum of the Air Force (NMAF) at Wright-Patterson near Dayton, OH in July, 2025

Data from

=== General characteristics ===
- Type: 6-cylinder liquid-cooled inline engine.
- Bore: 160 mm (6.30 in)
- Stroke: 180 mm (7.09 in)
- Displacement: 21.71 L (1,325.1 cu in)
- Length: 1,780 mm (70 in)
- Width: 560 mm (22 in)
- Height: 1,130 mm (44.5 in)
- Dry weight: 415 kg (915 lb)

=== Components ===
- Fuel system: Carburetor
- Fuel type: octane
- Cooling system: Liquid

=== Performance ===
- Power output: 245 hp at 1,700 rpm

== See also ==
Comparable engines

- Isotta Fraschini V.6
- Siddeley Puma

Related lists

- List of aircraft engines
