= List of former equipment of the Austrian Army =

For a list of equipment currently in use by the Austrian Armed Forces, see List of equipment of the Austrian Armed Forces.

== Austrian Republic (1970) ==
- Infantry weapons
  - Steyr M1912
  - Rast & Gasser M1898
  - Steyr-Mannlicher M1895
  - Mauser C96
  - MP 34
  - MG 30
  - Schwarzlose MG M.07/12
  - Stielhandgranate
  - Rohrhandgranate
- Armored car
  - ADGZ
  - OA vz. 23 (police)
- Tankette
  - Carro Veloce CV-33
  - Carro Veloce CV-35
  - ADMK Mulus
- Towed artillery
  - Skoda 75 mm Model 15
  - Skoda 100 mm Model 1916
  - 10 cm Feldhaubitze M 99
  - Böhler 47mm Model 1935 Anti-tank gun
- Aircraft (Austrian Air Force (1927-1938))
  - Breda Ba 28
  - Caproni Ca.100
  - Caproni Ca. 133
  - De Havilland DH.60
  - DFS Habicht
  - Fiat CR.20
  - Fiat CR.30
  - Fiat CR.32
  - Fiat A 120/A
  - Focke-Wulf Fw 44
  - Focke-Wulf Fw 56
  - Focke-Wulf Fw 58
  - Gotha Go 145
  - Hopfner HS 9/35
  - IMAM Ro.37
  - Junkers F 13
  - Udet U 12

== Austrian Republic (since 1970) ==
- Infantry weapons
  - M1911 pistol
  - M1935 (FN HP)
  - Radom M35
  - Tokarev TT
  - Luger P08
  - Walther P38
  - Walther PPK
  - M1 Garand
  - M1 Carbine
  - Steyr MPi 69
  - MP40
  - PPSh-41
  - Browning Automatic Rifle
  - StG 58
  - MG 42
  - M1919 Browning machine gun
  - Bazooka
  - M72 LAW
  - M40 recoilless rifle
  - 20 mm Fliegerabwehrkanone 65/68
- Vehicles
  - T-34
  - M24 Chaffee
  - M41 Walker Bulldog
  - M42 Duster
  - Charioteer
  - M47 Patton
  - M60 Patton
  - AMX-13
  - SK-105 Kürassier
  - Schützenpanzer A1
  - M578 Light Recovery Vehicle
  - Jaguar 1
  - M8 Greyhound
  - M3 Half-track
  - GMC CCKW
  - Willys MB
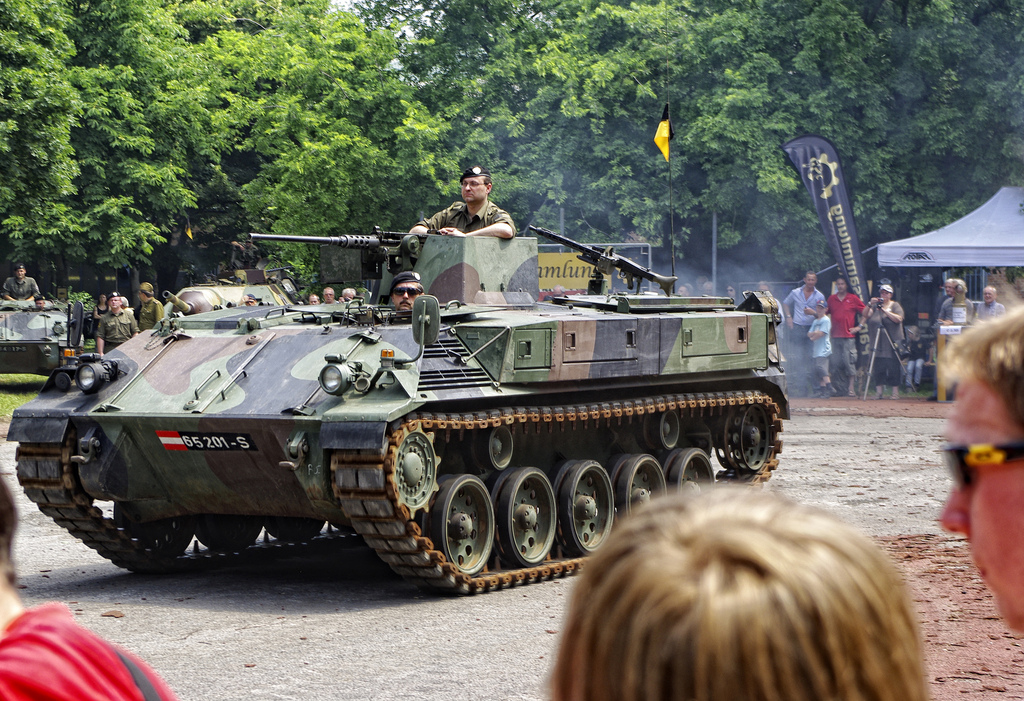
    Schützenpanzer Saurer A1
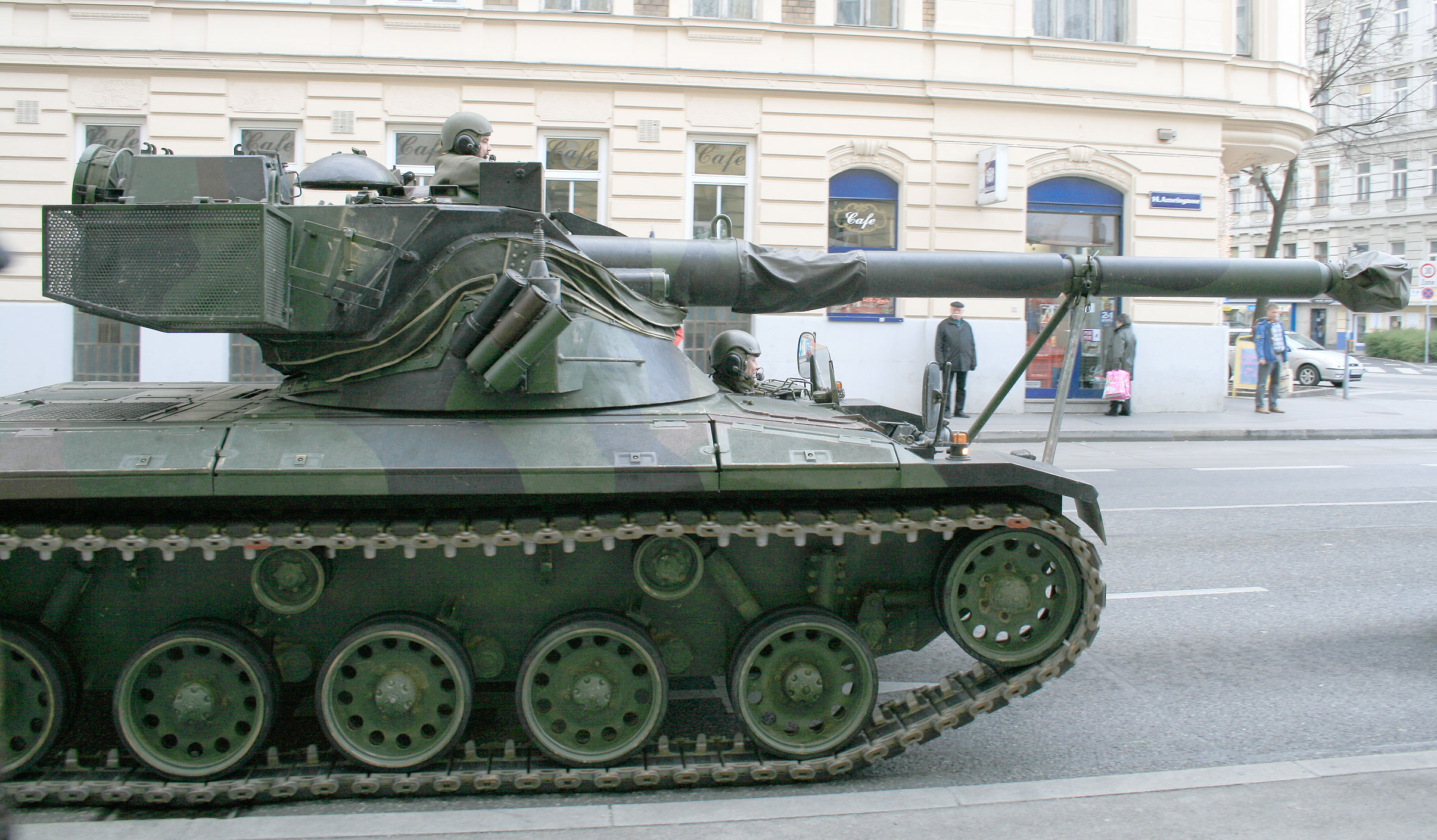
    Jagdpanzer SK-105 Kürassier
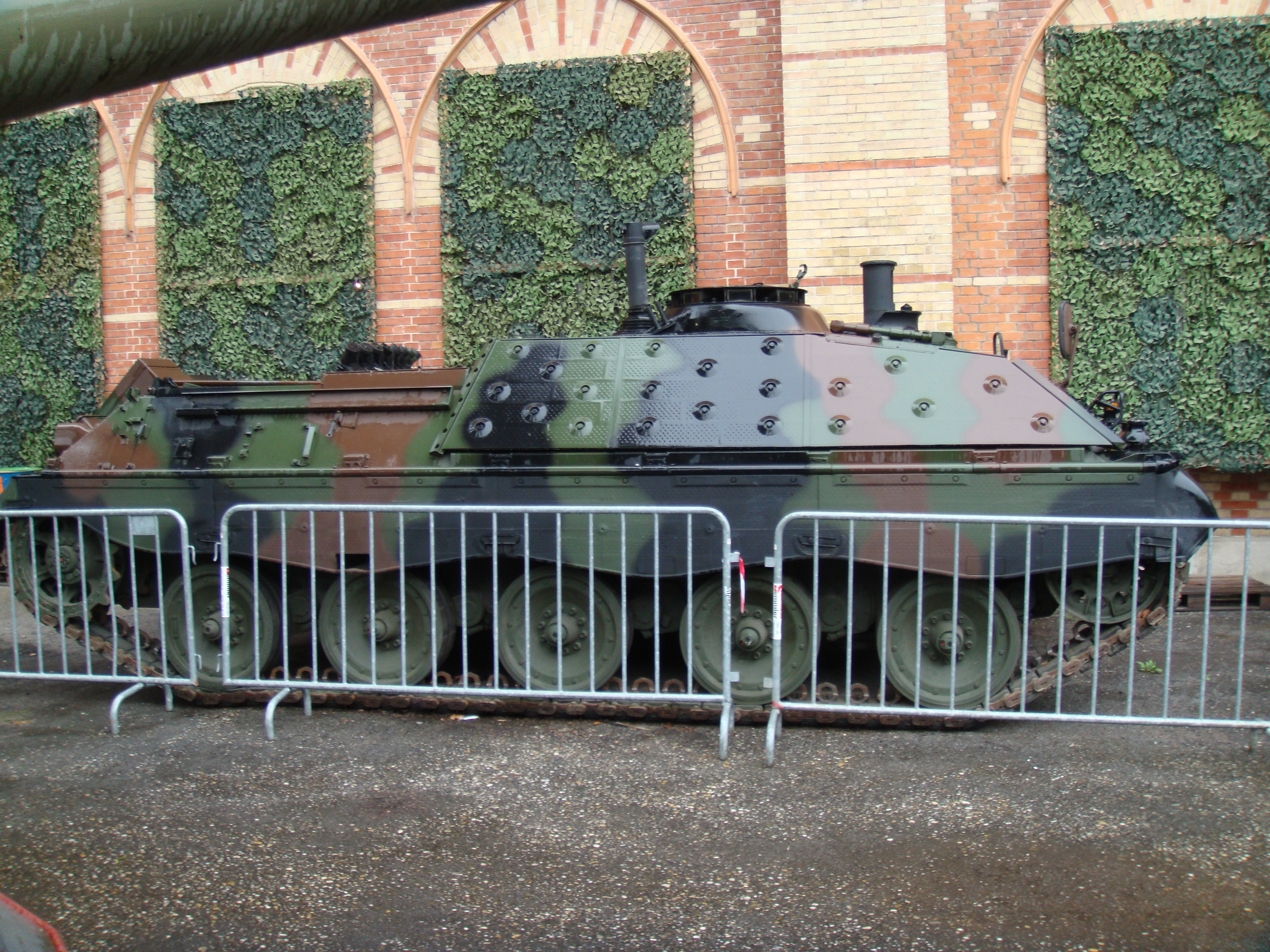
    Jagdpanzer Jaguar 1
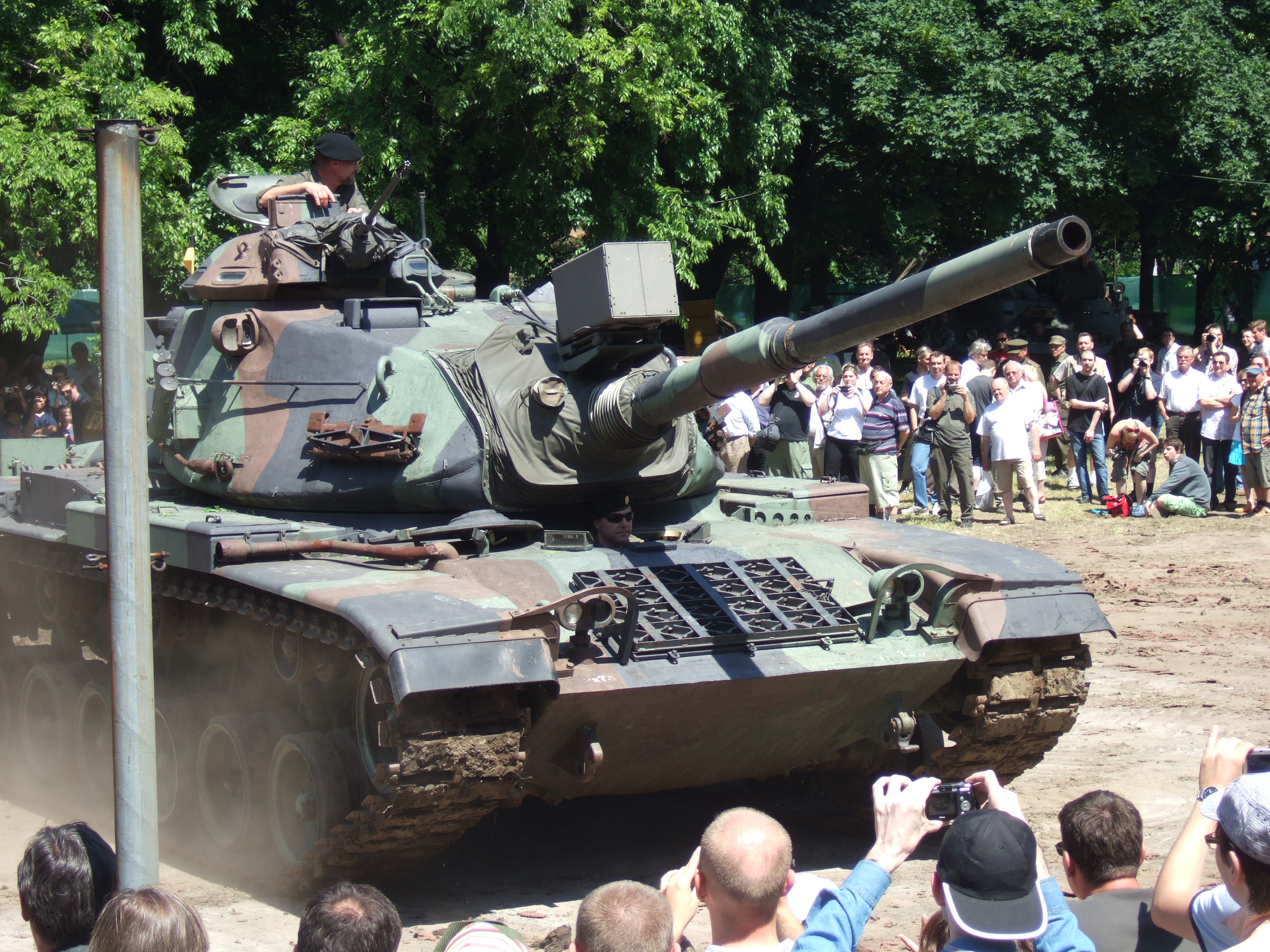
    M60 Patton
- Aircraft

See: List of military aircraft of Austria and Austrian Air Force
