= List of military aircraft of Austria =

List of military aircraft having served in Austria's military

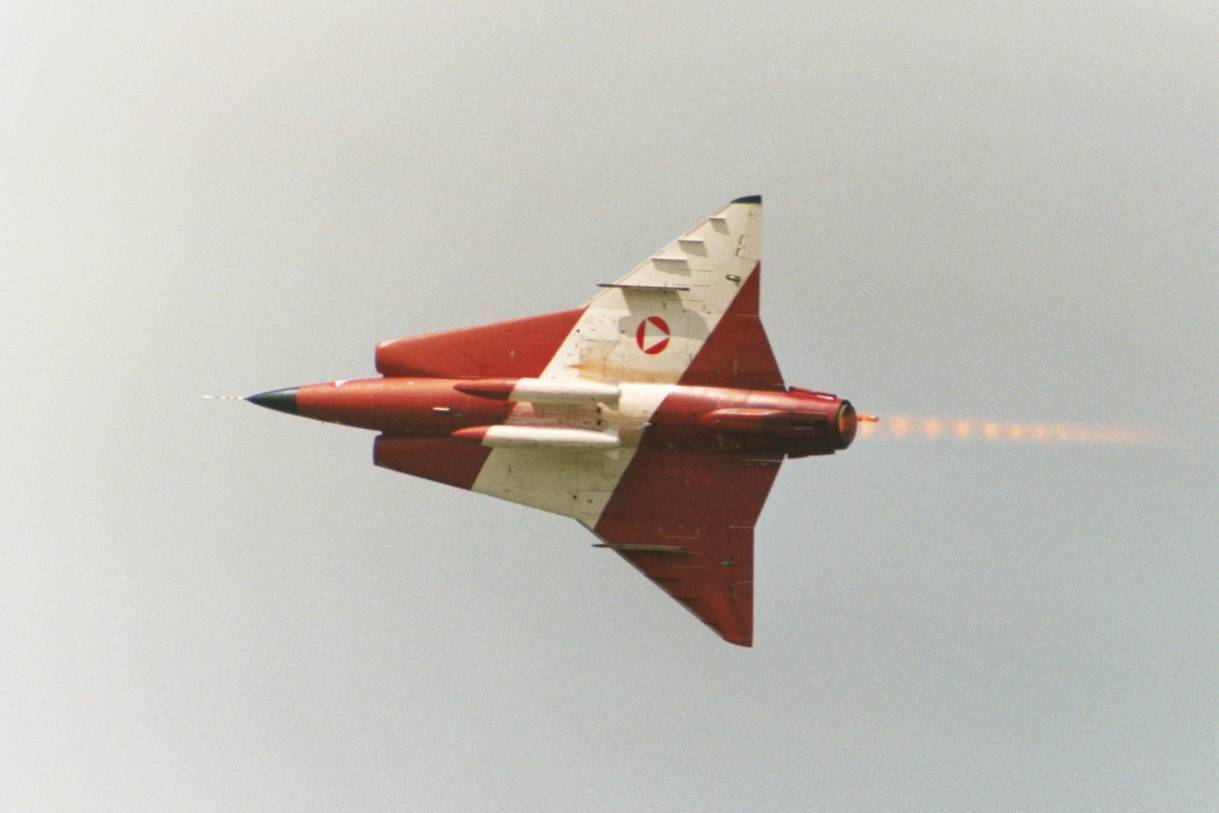
Austrian Saab 35 Draken painted in Austrian national colors

This is a list of Austrian military aircraft since its start (1927–1938, 1955–present), not including Austro-Hungarian aircraft. It is not guaranteed to be up-to-date or to be accurate, or complete. Aircraft still in service included.

== Designation system ==
Austria do not have their own indigenous designation system for aircraft, instead using the manufacturer name. Despite this, many colloquiall names and spellings have spread over the years, such as "J-105 OE" for the Saab 105Ö, stemming from its predecessor, the "J-29F". There is also the 1992 update done to the Saab 35Ö, nicknamed "J-35 OE Mark II".

It should also be mentioned that, vehicle variants specifically designed for Austria, often get the suffix Ö or OE by the manufacturer; Ö standing for Österreich, Austrias indigenous name, and OE being the international two letter code for the letter Ö.

== Aircraft ==
=== Bomber aircraft ===
Aircraft / colloquially	Origin	Type	Quantity	Notes	Period	Image
Caproni Ca.133	Italy	Light bomber / Light transport	5	Kommando Luftstreitkräfte: Fliegerregiment Nr 1, Fliegerregiment Nr 2 – Bomberstaffel 1B	1936–1938	
Junkers Ju 86K-1	Germany	Bomber	12	–	1937–1938	

=== Fighter aircraft ===
Aircraft / colloquially	Origin	Type	Quantity	Notes	Period	Image
Fiat CR.20bis	Italy	Fighter	16	Ex-Regia Aeronautica, acquired: 1931–1933.	1931–1938	
Fiat CR.20bis AQ	Italy	Fighter	16	Ex-Regia Aeronautica, acquired: 1931–1933.	1931–1938	–
Fiat CR.30	Italy	Fighter	3	–	1936–1938	
Fiat CR.32bis	Italy	Fighter	45	–	1936–1938	
Saab 29F; J-29 F „fliegende Tonne“	Sweden	Strike fighter	20	used in fighter bomber wings	1961–1972	
Saab 105Ö (Saab 105XT); J-105 OE	Sweden	Light combat aircraft	40	30 mm ADEN-gunpods, AA-rockets, Sidewinder-wiring	1970–2020	
Saab 35Ö (1985 mod); J-35 OE „Draken“ Mk.I	Sweden	Fighter / Interceptor	24	1985 original variant	1985–1992	
Saab 35Ö (1992 mod); J-35 OE „Draken“ Mk.II	Sweden	Fighter / Interceptor	24	1992 update: RWR + ECM	1992–2005	
Northrop F-5E Tiger II; F-5E „Tiger“ II	USA	Fighter / Interceptor	12	4-year lease from Switzerland	2004–2008	
Eurofighter Typhoon Tranche 1 Eurofighter „Typhoon“	(European Union) Multinational	Multirole fighter	15	–	2007–present	

=== Reconnaissance aircraft ===
Aircraft / colloquially	Origin	Type	Quantity	Notes	Period	Image
Ansaldo A.120R	Italy	Reconnaissance	≥5	Five aircraft seen in the photo.	1927–1938	
IMAM Ro.37	Italy	Reconnaissance	8	–	1927–1938	
Saab 29F (recce mod); J-29 F „fliegende Tonne“ (Aufklärungsversion)	Sweden	Recce fighter	10	camera housing replacing the two left guns	1961–1972	
Saab 105Ö (Saab 105XT); J-105 OE	Sweden	Tactical recce	8	equipped with Vinten camera pod (8 pods available) used as a recce aircraft until November 1992	1970–1992	

=== Surveillance aircraft ===
Aircraft / colloquially	Origin	Type	Quantity	Notes	Period	Image
Cessna L-19A+E	USA	Observation	29	–	1958–1997	

=== Target tug aircraft ===
Aircraft / colloquially	Origin	Type	Quantity	Notes	Period	Image
Saab 17A (target tug mod)	Sweden	Target tug	1	–	1957–1963	–

=== Trainer aircraft ===
Aircraft / colloquially	Origin	Type	Quantity	Notes	Period	Image
de Havilland DH.60 Moth; DH-60 „Moth“	UK	Basic trainer	–	–	1927–1938	–
Fiat CR.20B	Italy	Advanced trainer	4	Ex-Regia Aeronautica, acquired: 1931–1933.	1931–1938	–
Fiat CR.30B	Italy	Advanced trainer	1–3	–	1936–1938	
Focke-Wulf Fw 56 Stösser; Fw-56 „Stößer“	Germany	Advanced trainer	9	–	1936–1938	
Focke-Wulf Fw 58 Weihe; Fw-58 „Weihe“	Germany	Twin-engined advanced trainer	6	–	1937–1938	
Yakovlev Yak-18; Jak-18	(Soviet Union) USSR	Basic trainer	4	–	1955–1960	
Yakovlev Yak-11; Jak-11	(Soviet Union) USSR	Trainer	4	2 × 50 kg bombs	1956–1965	
Fiat G.46-4B	Italy	Basic trainer	5	–	1957–1963	
Zlin Z-126 Trener 2	(Czechoslovakia) ČSSR	Basic trainer	4	–	1957–1965	
de Havilland DH.115 Vampire T.55; DH-115 „Vampire“ T-55	UK	Advanced trainer Jet trainer	8	–	1957–1974	
Piaggio P.149D	Italy	Basic trainer	1	–	1958–1965	–
North American LT-6G Texan; LT-6G „Texan“	USA	Trainer / Liaison	10	–	1959–1968	
Fouga CM.170 Magister; Fouga „Magister“ CM-170	France	Jet trainer	18	–	1959–1972	
Saab 91D Safir	Sweden	Trainer / Liaison	24	–	1964–1993	
Saab 105Ö (Saab 105XT); J-105 OE	Sweden	Advanced trainer Jet trainer	30	–	1970–2022	
Pilatus PC-7/OE; PC-7 OE	Switzerland	Advanced trainer Trainer	12	12,7 mm gunpods, SNEB rocket pods	1983–present	
Diamond DA40 NG	Austria	Trainer	4	–	2018-present	
Alenia Aermacchi M-346FA Master	Italy	Advanced trainer	0 (+12 on order)	Also used in Fighter and Attack roles	On order	–

=== Transport aircraft ===
Aircraft / colloquially	Origin	Type	Quantity	Notes	Period	Image
Short SC.7 Skyvan 3M; SC-7 „Short Skyvan“	UK	Transport	2	placed in storage	1969–2007	
PC-6 Turbo-Porter	Switzerland	Utility / Transport	8	–	1976–present	
Lockheed C-130K Hercules	USA	Tactical airlifter	3	–	2003–present	
Embraer C-390 Millennium	Brazil	Tactical airlifter	0	4 on order	On order	–

=== Utility aircraft ===
Aircraft / colloquially	Origin	Type	Quantity	Notes	Period	Image
Cessna 172 Skyhawk	USA	Light utility	29	–	1957–1959	–
Cessna 182 Skylane	USA	Light utility	2	–	1957–1965	–
Piper PA-18-95	USA	Light utility	10	–	1957–1965	–
de Havilland Canada L-20 Beaver; DHC L-20 „Beaver“	Canada	STOL Utility / Transport	6	–	1960–1976	–

== Helicopters ==
=== Observation & scout helicopters ===
Aircraft / colloquially	Origin	Type	Quantity	Notes	Period	Image
Bell H-13H Sioux	USA	Light observation	–	–	1960–1976	–
Agusta Bell AB-206A	USA	Scout	–	–	1969–2009	
Bell OH-58B Kiowa	USA	Scout	10	–	1976–present	

=== Transport helicopters ===
Aircraft / colloquially	Origin	Type	Quantity	Notes	Period	Image
Westland-Sikorsky S-55 Whirlwind; S-55 „Whirlwind“	UK	Transport / Utility	10	–	1958–1965	–
Agusta Bell AB-204B	USA	Medium transport	26	–	1969–2001	
Sikorsky S-65Oe; S-65 OE	USA	Heavy transport	2	sold to Israel in 1981	1970–1981	
Agusta Bell AB-212	USA	Medium transport	22	–	1980–present	
Sikorsky S-70A-42 Black Hawk; S-70 „Black Hawk“	USA	Medium transport	9	3 S-70A and 12 UH-60M on order.	2002–present	

=== Utility helicopters ===
Aircraft / colloquially	Origin	Type	Quantity	Notes	Period	Image
Agusta Bell AB-47G-2	USA	Utility	–	–	1956–1969	–
Sud Aviation Alouette II	France	Utility	–	–	1958–1975	
Sud Aviation Alouette III	France	Utility / Liaison	21	–	1967–2024	
AgustaWestland AW169M	Italy	Utility	11	25 on order	2023–present	
