= List of Afghan Air Force aircraft =

This list of Afghan Air Force aircraft covers all aircraft operated by the Afghan Air Force (AAF) and its predecessors, including the Royal Afghan Air Force, Air and Air Defense Force of the Islamic Emirate of Afghanistan, and the air forces of the various militias and warlords.

== By name ==
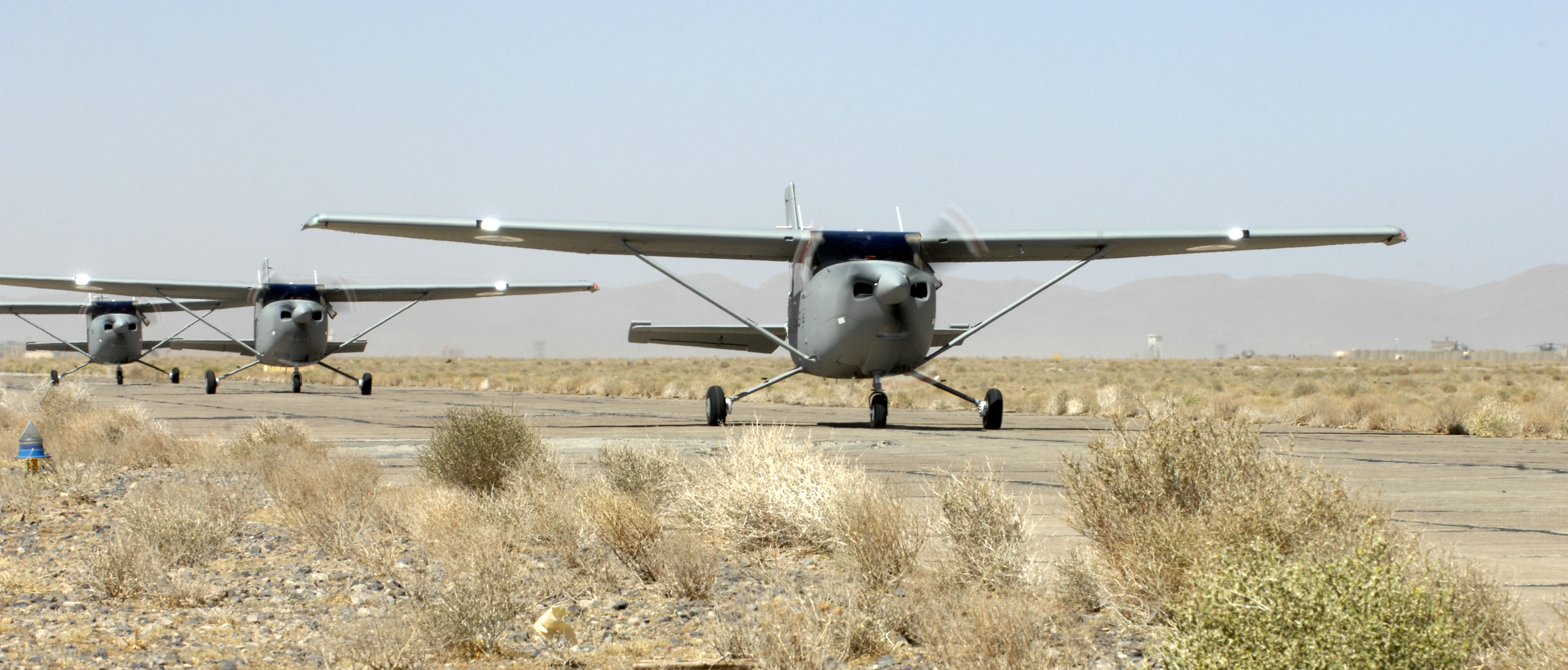
Cessna T182T trainers at Shindand Air Base

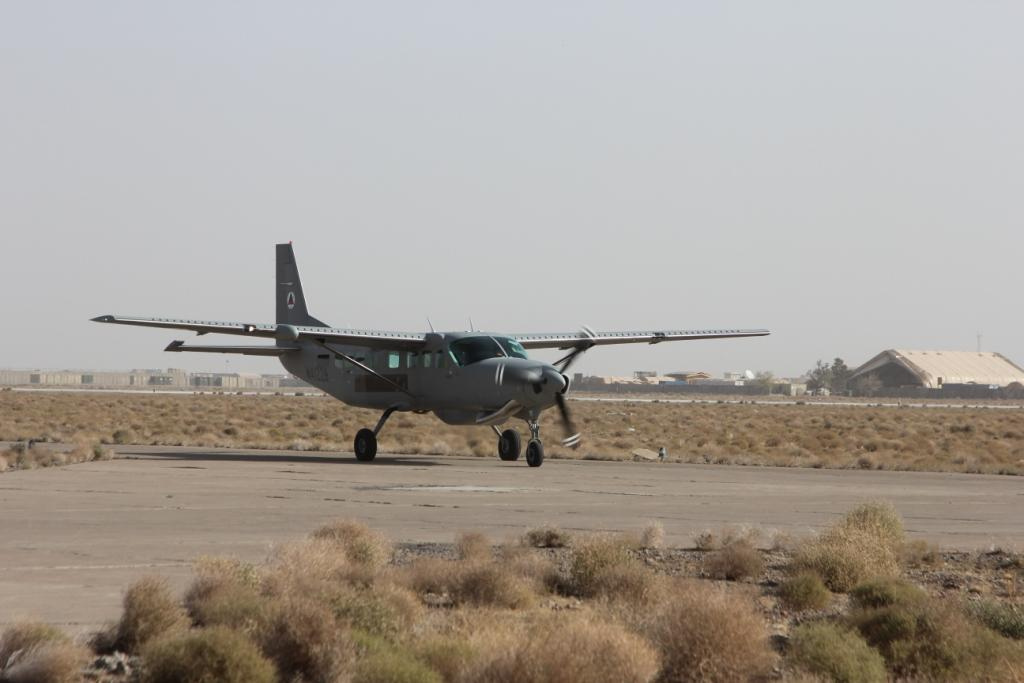
Cessna 208B at Shindand Air Base

A-29 Super Tucano

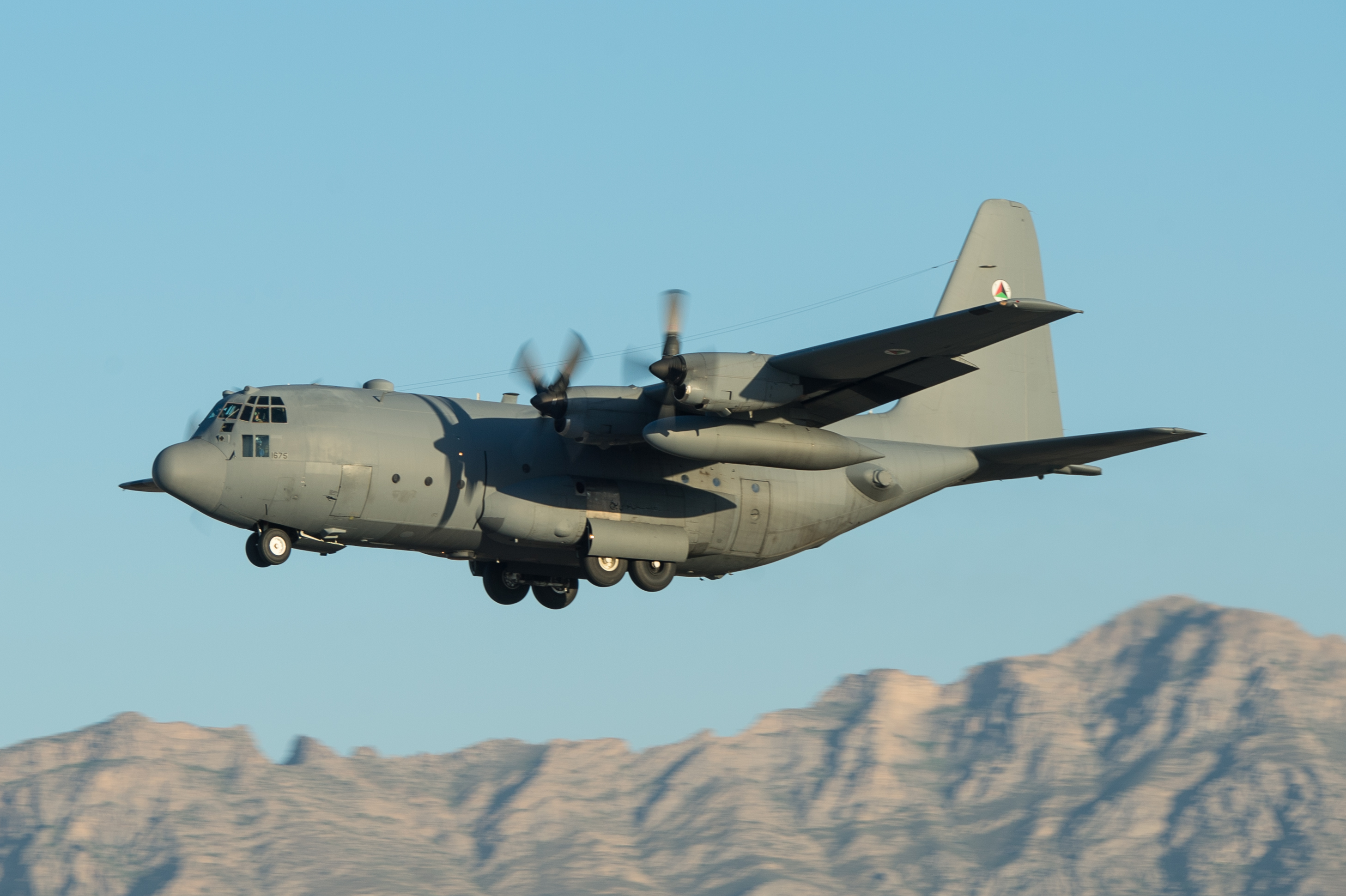
C-130 Hercules

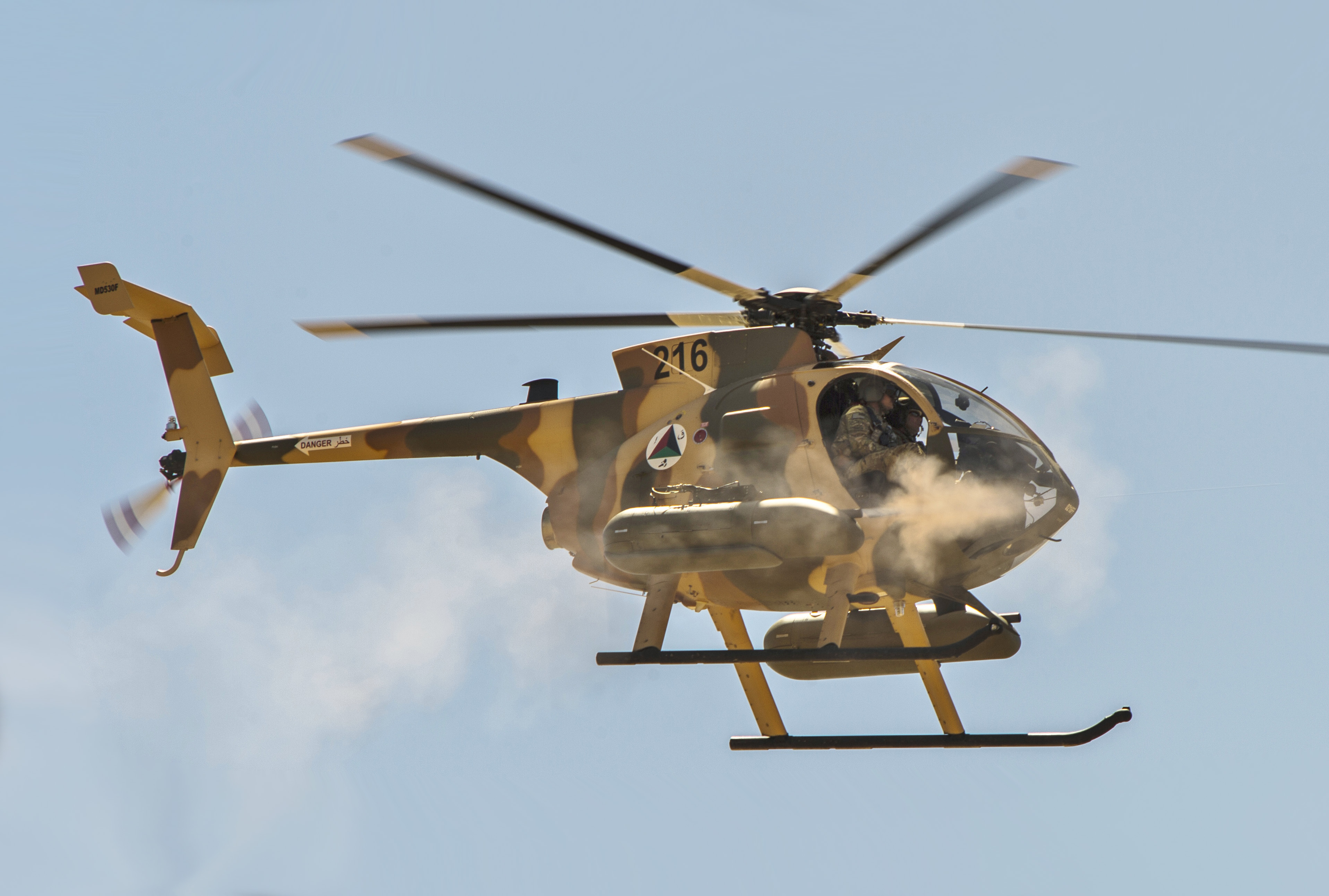
MD 530F firing off its gun pods

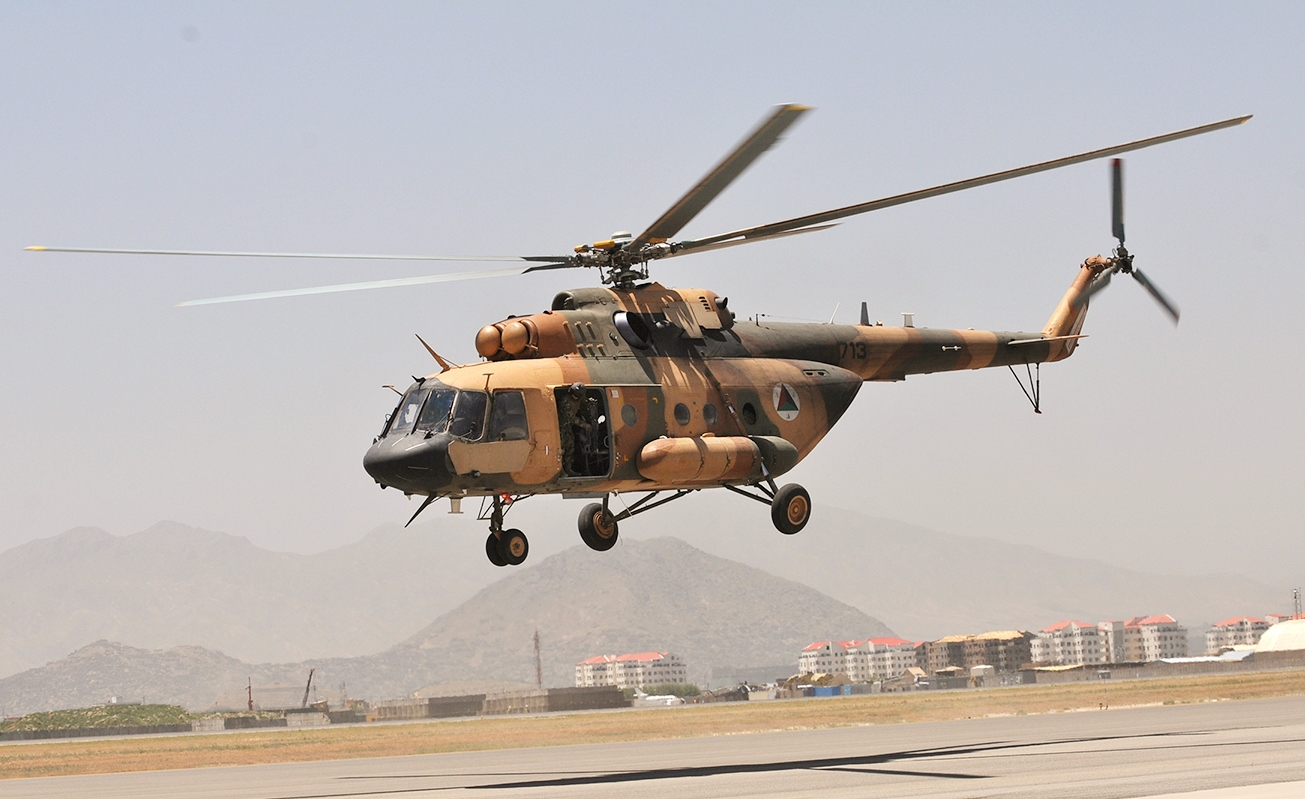
Mi-17

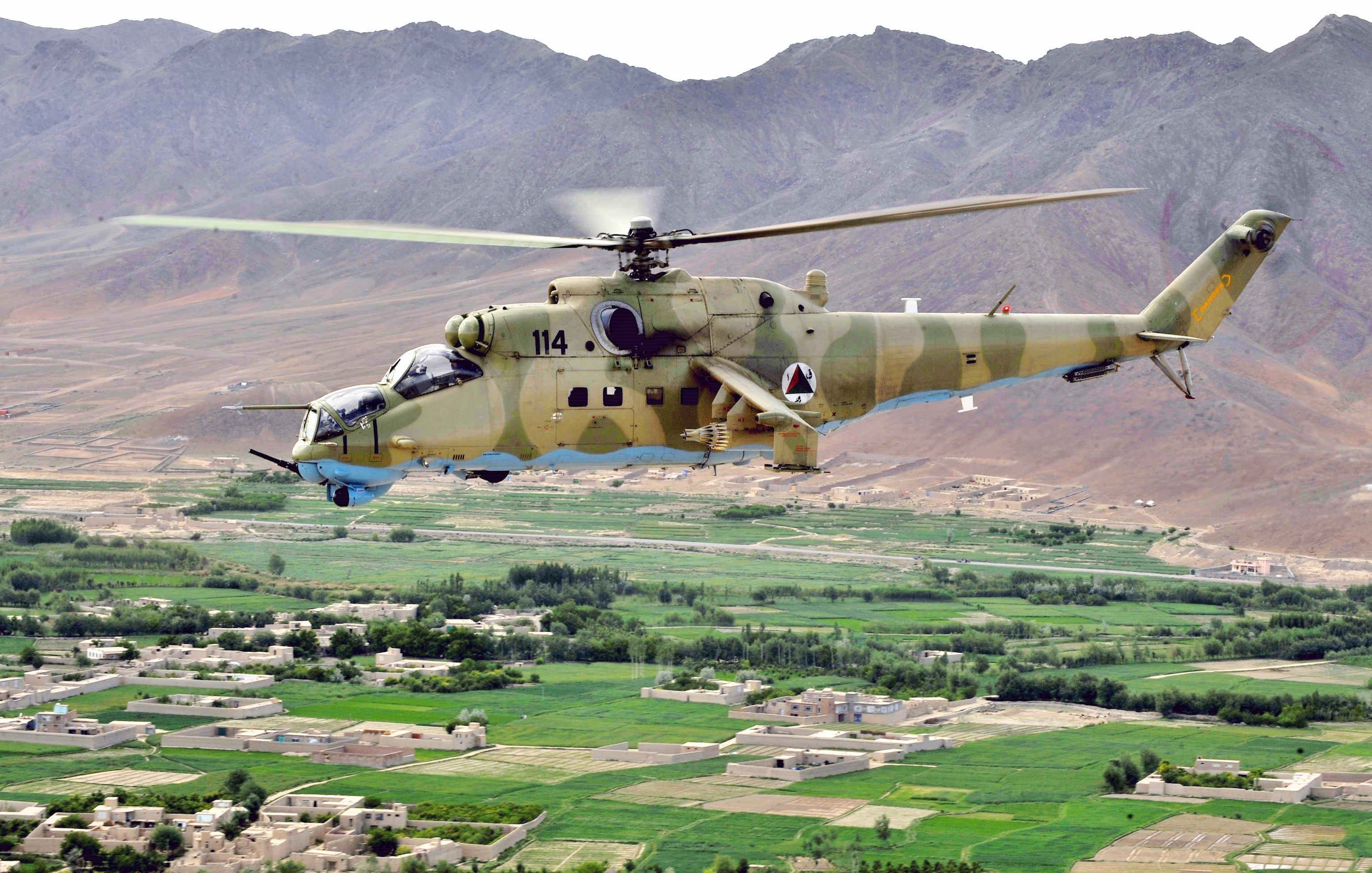
Mi-35

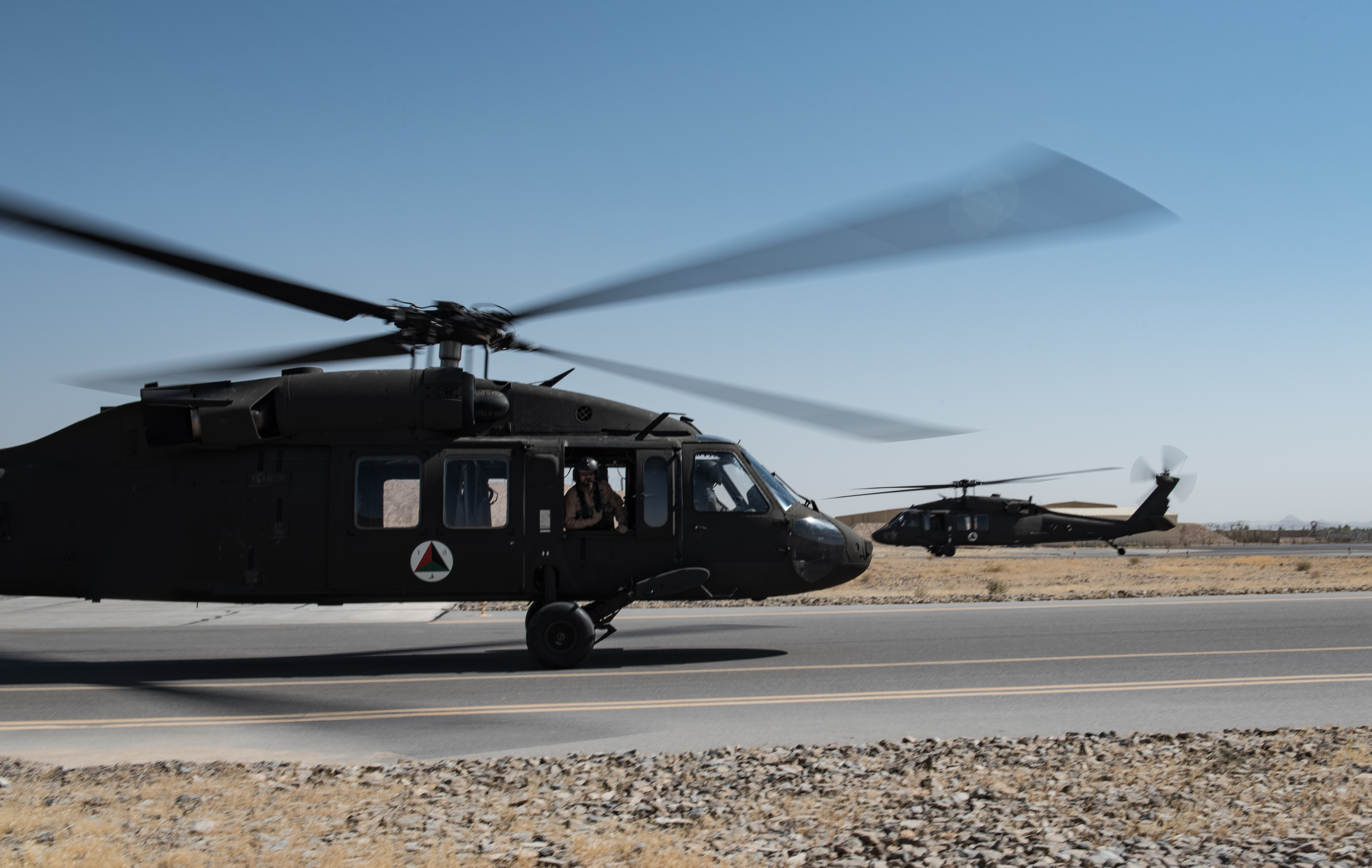
UH-60A Black Hawks at Kandahar Airfield

- Aero L-29 Delfín :24 received from 1978 and serving up to 1999
- Aero L-39C Albatros: 35 received from 1977, three reported in use in 1999 by Dostum-Gulbuddin Militia, three remaining in Air Force service, current status unknown
- Aeritalia C-27A: 20 of these tactical transports have been ordered by the United States for delivery from Italy by 2012. Delivered, but no longer in service
- Antonov An-2: More than a dozen received from 1957 for a variety of utility transport roles, some may have remained in service with various forces through 2000
- Antonov An-12B: 20 received from 1981 for heavy airlift duties, operational until 2001
- Antonov An-14B: 12 received from 1985 as utility transports, operational through 1991
- Antonov An-24TV: 6 received from 1975 as passenger transports, operational through 2001.Considering the time when it was exported, this model is reasonable.
- Antonov An-26: More than fifty received from 1975 as military cargo transports, operational until 2009.For its intended use, it is assumed to be a single An-26 with no suffix.
- Antonov An-30A: One received in 1985, did not survive the 1990s
- Antonov An-32: As many as seventy three received from 1987 as military cargo transports suited to Afghanistan's hot and high environment, operational until 2011
- Avro Anson 18: 13 received from 1948, with the last removed in 1972
- Bartel BM-4b: One obtained in 1928
- Breda Ba.25/28: Eight obtained from 1937, eliminated by 1945
- Bristol F.2 Fighter: Three obtained in 1919, served through 1929
- Boeing 727: 3 Entering service as VIP transports
- Cessna T182T: Six used between 2011 and 2016. Used as a basic trainer.
- Cessna 208B: 24 aircraft currently in service
- Cessna AC-208: 10 aircraft currently in service
- de Havilland DH.9A: Two added in 1924
- de Havilland R-1: 16 obtained from 1924 to 1926
- Embraer A-29 Super Tucano: Advanced fixed wing trainer and COIN Attack aircraft. 26 aircraft in service with AAF.
- HAL Cheetah 3 obtained from 2014, currently operational
- Hawker Hart: Eight obtained from 1937, soon replaced
- Hawker Hind: 28 obtained from 1938, served as late as 1957 (one flying model currently in Shuttleworth Collection)
- Ilyushin Il-10: Unconfirmed
- Ilyushin Il-14S/M/T: 26 received from 1955 on, served through 2001
- Ilyushin Il-18: 5 received from 1968, served through 2001.In addition, since it is unlikely that a civilian passenger version will be introduced, this is likely to be a military transport version of the IL-18VT.
- Ilyushin Il-28/U: 50 received as bombers plus 4 more as trainers from 1957, finally retired in 1994, although trainers may have remained through 2001
- IMAM Ro.37: 16 obtained for reconnaissance from 1937, out of service by 1941 (one on static display at Italian Embassy, Kabul)
- Junkers A.20: One squadron equipped from 1925 through 1929
- Junkers F.13fe: 4 obtained in 1924 and served through 1939
- Junkers G.24ge: 1 obtained in 1928
- Lockheed C-130 Hercules: 4 C-130H models obtained in 2013 as replacements for the C-27A's
- MD 530F: Either "18 currently operational;" 29 reported in service by FlightGlobal, 2017, or 68.
- Mikoyan-Gurevich MiG-15bis: 4 fighters received in 1951 and remained through 1979
- Mikoyan-Gurevich MiG-15UTI: 38 trainers received from 1957 and served as late as 1998
- Mikoyan-Gurevich MiG-17F: 100 fighters received from 1957. Remained mostly grounded by the end of 1980.
- Mikoyan-Gurevich MiG-19P: 18 acquired by the Royal Afghan Air Force in 1964. 20 MiG-19s were used as trainer aircraft by the Afghan Air Force during the DRA era.
- Mikoyan-Gurevich MiG-21FL: 40 fighters received from 1965 and serving up to 1996
- Mikoyan-Gurevich MiG-21MF: 70 fighters received from 1980 and serving up to 2001
- Mikoyan-Gurevich MiG-21bis: 50 fighters received from 1980 and serving up to 2005
- Mikoyan-Gurevich MiG-23MS: The Afghan Air Force received a total of 53 MiG-23MS between 1988 and 1990 following the Soviet withdrawal from Afghanistan.Most aircraft were shot down or destroyed on the ground during the Afghan Civil War
- Mil Mi-1: 12 utility helicopters received from 1957 and retained through 1976.Since it was introduced in 1957, it is speculated that the Mi-1TKR could be used for liaison and reconnaissance missions, given that it is in the Air Force.
- Mil Mi-2: About six delivered for use as utility transport helicopters in 1982.The aircraft has a Mi-2B as an export type for the Middle East, and it is said that it was also sent to Afghanistan.
- Mil Mi-4: 18 utility helicopters received from 1963 and remaining in service as late as 1997.There is a famous scene where soldiers are taking a commemorative photo immediately after the plane crashed, but since there is no rack for mounting weapons on the outside, it seems to be a Mi-4A type that transports assault soldiers.
- Mil Mi-6: Perhaps served briefly during the Soviet presence.No images left.
- Mil Mi-8T: 100 transport helicopters received from 1971
- Mil Mi-17-1: 35 transport helicopters delivered from 1987, with 39 currently in Air Force service (including three dedicated to presidential/distinguished visitor airlift).
- Mil Mi-17B5: 63 transport helicopters delivered from 2011.
- Mil Mi-25: 151 assault helicopters delivered from 1979
- Mil Mi-35: As of 2015, 6 in Air Force service, to be partially replaced by 20 Embraer A-29 Super Tucano
- Nieuport 24: Unknown number obtained from 1921
- Pilatus PC-12: Special operations ISR/ light transport/ utility aircraft, operational from 2014
- Potez 25: One obtained in 1928, destroyed in 1929
- Sopwith 1½ Strutter: A few obtained from 1921, discarded by 1925
- Sukhoi Su-7BMK/U: 24 attack and 16 trainer models received from 1972 and serving to 1989
- Sukhoi Su-22M3: 25 attack aircraft delivered from 1982, serving to 2001.Judging from the time, it is supposed to be the Su-22M3, an export version of the Su-17M3.
- Sukhoi Su-22M4: 45 attack aircraft delivered from 1984, serving to 2001.
- UH-60A: Four in use for training, with over 150 ordered an unlikely to be delivered in the coming years
- Yakovlev Yak-11: 14 primary trainers obtained from 1958, serving to 1999
- Yakovlev Yak-18: 14 trainers obtained from 1957, serving 2001

== By date of service ==
- 1919 to 1929: Bristol F.2 Fighter
- 1921 to ?: Nieuport 24
- 1921 to 1925: Sopwith 1½ Strutter

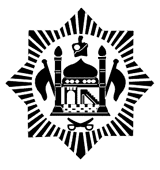
1924 to 1929

- 1924 to ?: de Havilland DH.9A
- 1924 to 1926: de Havilland R-1
- 1924 to 1939: Junkers F.13fe
- 1925 to 1929: Junkers A.20
- 1928 to ?: Bartel BM 4b
- 1928 to ?: Junkers G.24ge
- 1928 to 1929: Potez 25

1937 to 1967

- 1937 to ?: Hawker Hart
- 1937 to 1945: Breda Ba.25/28
- 1937 to 1941: IMAM Ro.37 (one on static display at Italian Embassy, Kabul)
- 1938 to 1957: Hawker Hind (one flying model currently in Shuttleworth Collection)
- 1948 to 1972: Avro Anson
- 1951 to 1979: Mikoyan MiG-15
- 1955 to 2001: Ilyushin Il-14
- 1957 to 2001: Ilyushin Il-28
- 1957 to 2001: Yakovlev Yak-18
- 1957 to 1976: Mil Mi-1
- 1957 to 1998: Mikoyan MiG-15UTI
- 1957 to 2000: Antonov An-2
- 1957 to 2001: Mikoyan MiG-17
- 1958 to 1999: Yakovlev Yak-11
- 1963 to 1997: Mil Mi-4

1967 to 1979

- 1965 to 2001: Mikoyan-Gurevich MiG-21
- 1968 to 2001: Ilyushin Il-18
- 1971 to present: Mil Mi-8
- 1972 to 1999: Sukhoi Su-7
- 1975 to 2001: Antonov An-24
- 1975 to 2009: Antonov An-26
- 1977 to present: Aero L-39 Albatros
- 1978 to 1999: Aero L-29 Delfín
- 1979 to ?: Mil Mi-24
- 1981 to 2001: Antonov An-12
- 1982 to ?: Mil Mi-2
- 1982 to 2001: Sukhoi Su-17

1983 to 1994

- 1984 to 2001: Sukhoi Su-22
- 1985 to 1990s: Antonov An-30
- 1985 to 1991: Antonov An-14
- 1987 to 2011: Antonov An-32
- 1987 to present: Mil Mi-17
- ? to present: Mil Mi-35
- 2009 to 2012: Aeritalia G.222 (Designated as C-27A)
- 2011 to 2016: Cessna T182T Skylane
- 2011 to present: Cessna 208B
- 2011 to present: MD 530F
- 2013 to present C-130
- 2013 to present PC-12
- 2014 to present HAL Cheetah
- 2016 to present Embraer A-29 Super Tucano
