= CANSA FC.12 =

FC.12
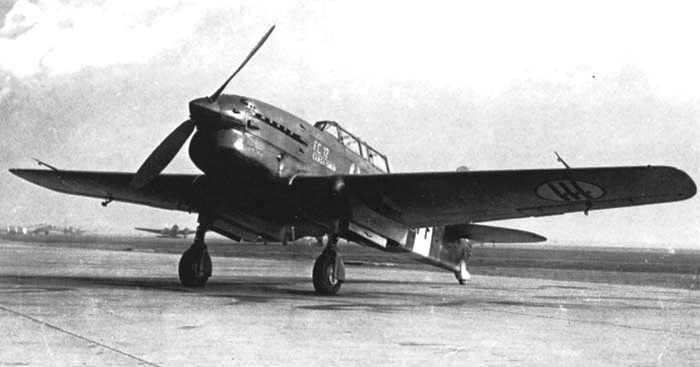

General information
- Type: Ground attack
- National origin: Italy
- Manufacturer: Construzioni Aeronautiche Novaresi S.A. (FIAT) (CANSA)
- Primary user: Regia Aeronautica
- Number built: 11

History
- First flight: 1940

The CANSA FC.12 was a single engine monoplane ground attack aircraft developed in Italy around 1940. A crew of two were seated in tandem. Only ten production aircraft were built.

== Design and development ==
The CANSA FC.12 was originally designed as a fighter and dive bomber trainer but the few machines produced were configured for the operational ground attack role.

It was a cantilever low wing monoplane with wings of straight tapered plan and with rounded tips. The undersides of the wings carried short span dive brakes outside of the full chord, narrow baths into which the main undercarriage retracted backwards, leaving the wheels partly exposed. In addition there were mid span, mid chord spoilers.

The FC.12 was powered by a 450 kW (600 hp) FIAT A.30 R.A. liquid-cooled V-12 engine, fitted with a chin radiator. The two crew had tandem seats, the aft one behind the wing trailing edge, under a multi-framed canopy. The horizontal tail was elliptical in plan and mounted on top of the fuselage. Fin and rudder were similarly shaped, with the rudder ending at the upper fuselage. All the rear control surfaces were horn balanced and the elevators carried tabs. There was a small, faired tailwheel on the extreme fuselage.

Four fixed, forward firing 12.7 mm (0.50 in) machine guns provided the main attack armament. The rear cockpit was provided with a fifth, swivel-mounted gun.

In June 1941, a prototype of a high-altitude version was completed, designed to intercept Allied bombers with a more powerful engine (660 hp) and 2 additional machine guns in the wings.

== Operational history ==
Ten ground attack production FC.12s were delivered, though they probably did not see combat.

== Operators ==
Kingdom of Italy

- Regia Aeronautica

== Specifications ==
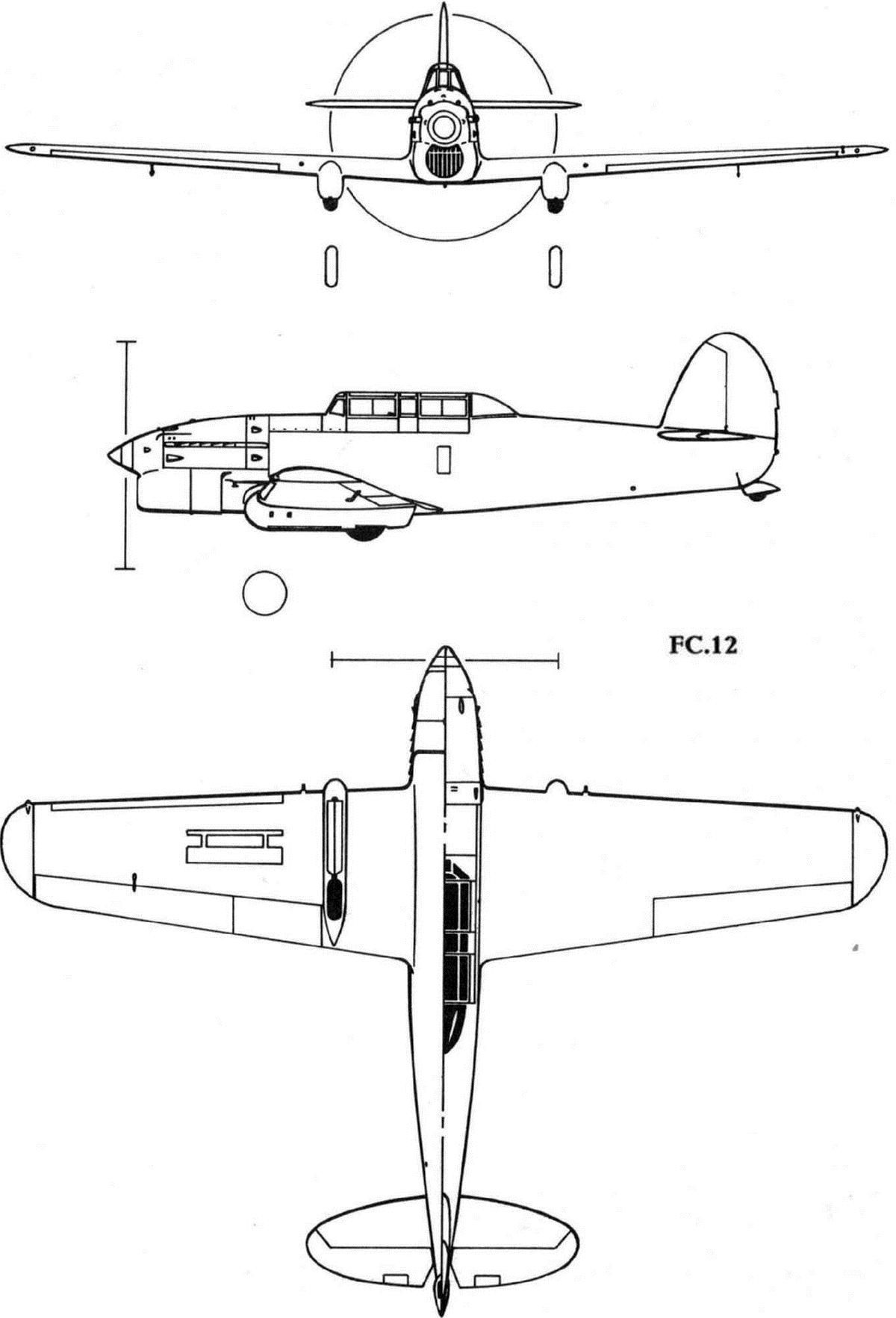

Data from Italian Civil and Military Aircraft 1930-1945

General characteristics

- Crew: 2
- Length: 7.52 m (24 ft 8 in)
- Wingspan: 10.00 m (32 ft 10 in)
- Height: 2.31 m (7 ft 7 in)
- Wing area: 19.8 m^{2} (213 sq ft)
- Empty weight: 1,796 kg (3,960 lb)
- Gross weight: 2,320 kg (5,115 lb)
- Powerplant: 1 × Fiat A.30 R.A. upright V-12 liquid-cooled, 450 kW (600 hp)
- Propellers: 2-bladed

Performance

- Maximum speed: 452 km/h (281 mph, 244 kn)
- Range: 1,339 km (832 mi, 723 nmi)
- Service ceiling: 7,120 m (23,350 ft)

Armament

- Guns: 5 × 12.7 mm (0.50 in) machine guns, two in wings, two in fuselage and one swivel mounted in rear cockpit
