= Fiat A.30 =

1920s Italian piston aircraft engine

A.30
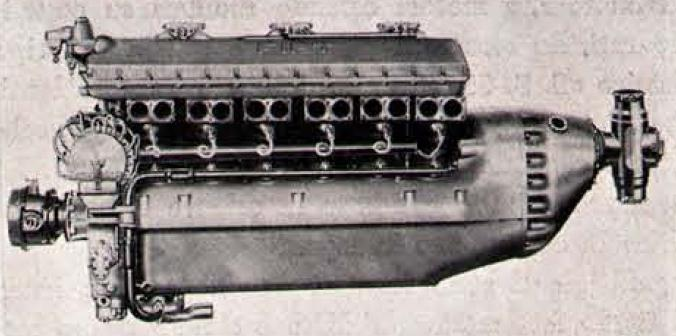
- Type: Water-cooled V-12
- Manufacturer: Fiat Aviazione
- First run: c.1930
- Number built: 2,679

The Fiat A.30 R.A. was an Italian water-cooled aircraft engine from the 1920s, built in large numbers and serving with several air forces up to the beginning of World War II. It produced 447 kW (600 hp).

== Design and development ==
During the second half of the 1920s Fiat introduced several water-cooled aircraft engines, including the A.20, A.23, A.24, A.25 and A.30. They were all upright V-12s with 60° between the cylinder banks; capacities ranged between 18.7 L and 54.5 L (1,141-3,326 cu in) and power outputs between 320 kW and 745 kW (430-1,000 hp). Producing 447 kW (600 hp) from 24.0 L (1,464 cu in), the A.30RA was towards the low power end of these ranges. The R, (Riduttori - reduced), indicated that the output was geared down.

Many of the production A.30 R.A.s were fitted in Fiat's own fighters and fighter trainers, particularly in the Fiat C.R.32. Both this aircraft type and the Meridionali Ro.37 remained in service with the Regia Aeronautica when Italy joined in World War II in 1940; by then the engine was seriously dated. Before the war similarly powered CR.30s had been sold to the air forces of Austria, China and Paraguay, the Austrian aircraft ending their service with the Luftwaffe after the Anschluss. Ultimately 2,679 A.30 R.A. and A.30 R.A.bis engines were built.

== Variants ==
From Thompson

A.30 R.A.
A.30 R.A.bis

== Applications ==
From Thompson

- CMASA MF.10
- Fiat CR.30
- Fiat CR.32
- Fiat CANSA FC.12
- IMAM Ro.37

== Specifications (A.30 R.A.) ==
Data from Jane's All the World's Aircraft 1938

=== General characteristics ===
- Type: water-cooled 60° upright V-12
- Bore: 135 mm (5.31 in)
- Stroke: 140 mm 5.51 in)
- Displacement: 24.0 L ( 1,464 cu in)
- Length: 1.751 m (68.94 in)
- Width: 653 mm (25.71 in)
- Height: 935 mm (36.82 in)
- Dry weight: 480 kg (1,060 lb)

=== Components ===
- Valvetrain: Two overhead camshafts, geared together, driving two inlet and two exhaust valves per cylinder. Housed under aluminium casings.
- Fuel system: Twin water heated Fiat carburetters mounted between cylinder banks, one serving each bank. Two spark plugs per cylinder, placed horizontally and opposite each other, supplied by two Marelli MF.12 magnetos.
- Oil system: One delivery pump and two scavenge pumps, in a single unit.
- Cooling system: water, with centrifugal pump.
- Reduction gear: 1.611:1 spur gear, lubricated via oil spout.
- Cylinders: Forged steel barrels, with closed, flat ends.
- Pistons: Aluminium alloy, two compression rings and one scraper ring above a fully floating gudgeon pin, with a second scraper ring below it.
- Crankshaft: Each six throw, seven bearings.
- Crankcase: Each an aluminium casting, split on crankshaft centre line. Bolted-on duralumin end caps.

=== Performance ===
- Power output: Normal, 447 kW (600 hp) at 2,000 rpm at sea level. Take-off, 596 kW (800 hp) at 2,900 rpm.
- Compression ratio: 8:1
- Fuel consumption: 0.322 kg/kWh (0.529 lb/hph)

== See also ==
Related lists

- List of aircraft engines
