= Austrian Air Force (1927–1938) =

Aerial warfare branch of Austria's military

Roundel of the Austrian Air Force

The Austrian Air Force (Österreichische Luftstreitkräfte) of the interwar period began as a paramilitary organisation in 1927, and was secretly built up by the government before union with Germany in 1938.

== History ==
In 1919 the Treaty of Versailles meant the Republic of Austria was forbidden to operate military aircraft.

In 1927 the paramilitary Heimwehr organisation set up an air corps using Austrian, British and Italian aircraft (dissolved after the Anschluss in 1938). Its emblem was a red-white-red flag, with a white eagle on a green circle at its centre.

In 1928 the Bundesheer (federal army) began secretly training pilots. In further consequence a technical infrastructure was created and aircraft ordered from Italy. In August 1933 the first military aeroplanes ordered by the republic (five Fiat CR.20 biplanes) were supplied. The Bundesheer began secretly equipping flying clubs in Vienna-Aspern and Graz-Thalerhof with Italian-built aircraft (Fiat Ansaldo and Caproni).

In 1936, flight engineer Rosner from the Graz-Thalerhof base won the competition for designing a new national emblem, which was introduced in the same year. The white, equilateral triangle with the point facing downwards in a red disc was a completely new design and had (other than the flag or coats of arms) no prior basis.

The airmens' barracks at Aspern were the only new barracks built in Vienna between the wars. The Austrian government planned the establishment of an air base in the Tulln Basin, however this plan was realised only by the German armed forces (nowadays: Brumowski Air base, near Langenlebarn). The uniform departed from all traditions and followed the international model: Grey jacket with four buttons as well as rocker emblem on the chest, and soft garrison caps more reminiscent of British models.

=== Secret Military Training (1928–1933) ===
In 1928, the Bundesheer (federal army) began clandestinely training pilots for the future Austrian Air Force. A technical infrastructure was developed, and orders for aircraft were placed, mainly from Italy.

In August 1933, the Republic of Austria received its first military aircraft – five Fiat CR.20 biplanes.

== Order of battle ==
=== Fliegerregiment Nr. 1 ===
The regiment was set up 1934 and had its location in Vienna.

==== Commander ====
- Oberstleutnant Josef Brunner (2 May 1934 - March 1938)

==== Units ====
(as of 1934)

- Jagdgeschwader -3 Staffeln (Fighter wing - three squadrons)
- Bombengeschwader - 3 Staffeln (Bomber wing - three squadrons)
- Schulgeschwader - 3 Staffeln (Training wing - three squadrons)
- Flughafenkompanie Nr. 2, 4, 6 & 8 (Aerodrome companies)
- Flieger-Parkkompanie Nr. 2 & 3 (Aircraft park companies)
- Fliegerwaffenkompanie (Air armament company)

=== Fliegerregiment Nr. 2 ===
The regiment was set up 1934 and had its location in Graz.

==== Commanders ====
- Oberst Julius Yllam (1 April 1934 - 28 February 1937)
- Oberstleutnant Viktor Seebauer (1 March 1937 - March 1938)

==== Units ====
(as of 1934)

- Jagdgeschwader - 3 Staffeln (Fighter wing - three squadrons)
- Aufklärungsgeschwader - 3 Nahaufklärungsstaffeln (Reconnaissance wing - three squadrons)
- Flughafenkompanie Nr. 1, 3, 5, & 7 (Aerodrome companies)
- Flieger-Parkkompanie Nr. 1 (Aircraft park companies)
- Beobachterkompanie (Observer company)
- Flugfunkkompanie (Air radio company)
- Luftbildkompanie (Aerial photography company)

=== Air defence units ===
(as of 1938)

- Kommando der Luftschutztruppen (Air Defence Command), Vienna
- Schwere Flugabwehr-Batterie (Heavy air defence battery) with five 8-cm-Flak M14
- Two Flugabwehr-Maschinenkanonen-Abteilungen (anti-aircraft units) each with 3 batteries of 4-cm-Flak
- Leichte Flugabwehr-Kompanie (Light anti-aircraft company) with 2-cm-Flak
- Leichte Flugabwehr-Kompanie with anti-aircraft machine-guns
- Flug-Nachrichten-Kompanie (Air message company)
- Luftschutzschule (Air defence school)

=== Ground units ===
(as of 1938)

- Flugzeugwerft in Graz (Aircraft works)
- Fliegertelegraphen-Kompanie (Air telegraph company)
- Aerodromes at:
  - Aigen im Ennstal
  - Graz-Thalerhof
  - Klagenfurt
  - Wels
  - Wien (Vienna-Aspern)
  - Wiener Neustadt
  - Zeltweg

=== Aircraft ===
(as of March 1938)

==== Fliegerregiment Nr. 1 ====
- Jagdstaffel 1: 12 Fiat CR.20bis/bip as well as trainer aircraft Falke RVa, Focke-Wulf Fw 44, Focke-Wulf Fw 56, Gotha Go 145, Phoenix L2c
- Jagdstaffel 2: 12 Fiat CR.20bis/bip as well as trainer aircraft Falke RVa, Focke-Wulf Fw 44, Breda Ba 28 and Gotha Go 145
- Jagdstaffel 3: 12 Fiat CR.20bis/bip as well as trainer aircraft Focke-Wulf Fw 56 and Breda Ba 28
- Bomberstaffel 1: Focke-Wulf Fw 58, Caproni Ca 133 as well as trainer aircraft Breda Ba 28 and Focke-Wulf Fw 44
- Bomberstaffel 2: Caproni Ca 133, Focke-Wulf Fw 58 and trainer aircraft Junkers F 13
- Schulstaffel A: Caproni Ca 100, De Havilland DH.60GIII, Hopfner HS 9/35 and Udet U 12
- Schulstaffel B: De Havilland DH.60GIII, Focke-Wulf Fw 44, Gotha Go 145 and Hopfner HM 13/34

==== Fliegerregiment Nr. 2 ====
- Jagdstaffel 4: 12 Fiat CR.32bis as well as trainer aircraft Fiat CR.30 and de Havilland DH.60GIII
- Jagdstaffel 5: 12 Fiat CR.32 as well as trainer aircraft Fiat CR.30 and Udet U 12a
- Jagdstaffel 6: 12 Fiat CR.32 as well as trainer aircraft Fiat CR.30 and De Havilland DH.60GIII
- Aufklärungsstaffel 1: 8 Fiat A 120/A and trainer aircraft Udet 12a
- Aufklärungsstaffel 2: 8 IMAM Ro.37 and trainer aircraft Hopfner 8/29
- Schulstaffel Thalerhof: DFS Habicht, Falke RVa, Focke Wulf Fw 44 and Gotha Go 145

Of the 45 Fiat CR.32 originally procured, 36 were still in service in 1938 and after the Anschluss were handed over by Germany to their Hungarian allies.

The CR20 and CR32 were in their time very modern combat aircraft, however were obsolete by 1938. Their type designation "CR" stood for Caccia (Italian for 'hunt') and the name of the technical designer Rosatelli. "A" in the type designation Fiat A120 stands for the aircraft section of the Ansaldo company, taken over by Fiat in 1926.
