= IMAM Ro.37 =

Italian reconnaissance biplane

Ro.37
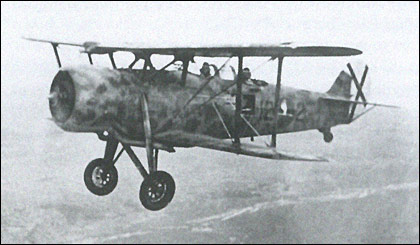

General information
- Type: Reconnaissance
- Manufacturer: Meridionali
- Designer: Nicola Romeo
- Primary user: Regia Aeronautica
- Number built: 617

History
- First flight: 6 November 1933
- Variant: IMAM Ro.43

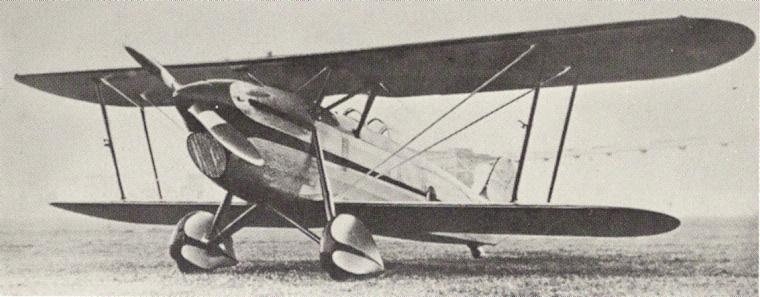
The initial version of the Ro.37 with the Fiat A.30 inline engine

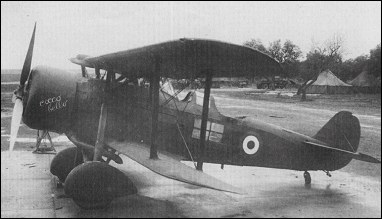
The main production version of the Ro.37 with the Piaggio P.IX radial engine

The Meridionali Ro.37 Lince (Italian: "Lynx") was a two-seater Italian reconnaissance biplane, a product of the Industrie Meccaniche Aeronautiche Meridionali (IMAM) company. It appeared in 1934 and had a composite structure of wood and metal. The aeroplane first saw operational duty in the Second Italo-Ethiopian War (1935–1936) and Spanish Civil War (1936–1939), and during the Second World War it saw duty on almost all fronts, except for Russia and the English Channel. It followed the Ro.1 as the main reconnaissance aircraft for the Italian Army.

== Design and development ==
A contest was held by the Regia Aeronautica for a light reconnaissance aircraft and a heavier aeroplane. The first was to have had 350 km/h (190 knots/220 mph) maximum speed, five hours endurance, three machine guns and a bomblets dispenser, armour, and the capability to operate from improvised airfields. The heavier aircraft was to have had 325 km/h (202 mph; 175 kn) maximum speed, at least 1,300 km (810 mi; 700 nmi) endurance, 7,000 m (23,000 ft) ceiling, climb to 5,000 m (16,000 ft) in 19 minutes, three crew, five weapons, a high wing and other details.

Limited production of the IMAM Ro.30, an improved Ro.1 with a defensive turret and better engine, resulted. It was rejected by the Regio Esercito and not chosen for production, being capable only of 200 km/h (120 mph; 110 kn), five hours' endurance, climb to 4,000 m (13,000 ft) in 20 minutes, and having three weapons.

IMAM did not give up after the modest success of the Ro.30 and so designed a new aircraft, the Ro.37, which first flew in 1933.

This was a biplane of mixed construction, with two seats, and a 420 kW (560 hp) Fiat A.30 R.A. V-12 engine. It reached 300 km/h (190 mph; 160 kn) and perhaps even more with this engine, the same as that of the Fiat CR.32. The Ro.37 had a 7,000 m (23,000 ft) ceiling, 3,000 m (9,800 ft) climb in 11 minutes, over 1,200 km (750 mi) range, carrying three machine guns (two in the nose and one dorsal), twelve 15 kg (33 lb) bombs, and good agility. It was similar to the Hawker Hind, rather than a light army aircraft, and its performance was similar to the later Westland Lysander and the contemporary Hawker Hector.

The Ro.37 was later fitted with the 447 kW (600 hp) Piaggio Stella P.IX R.C.40 radial engine. The better reliability of this engine was considered more desirable and so this was the main version produced.

=== Ro.45 ===
The last of the classic biplanes made by IMAM was an enhanced Ro.37. The sole Ro.45 was first flown on 10 December 1935, but did not enter production.

== Operational service ==
The Ro. 37 served as standard equipment in observation units for many years. However, during WWII, and particularly on the African front, the aeroplane was used in other roles, including tactical support and fighter duty. 103 Squadron was equipped in mid-1935 and swiftly employed in Ethiopia during the Second Italo-Ethiopian War. In December 1935 this unit was sent to Italian Somaliland, and eventually another four squadrons went to this theatre: 105, 108, 109, and 110 Squadrons, for a total of ten Ro.37 and 41 Ro.37Bis. With the end of operations, 110 Squadron remained in the theatre, deployed in counterinsurgency tasks and serving as reinforcement for isolated garrisons.

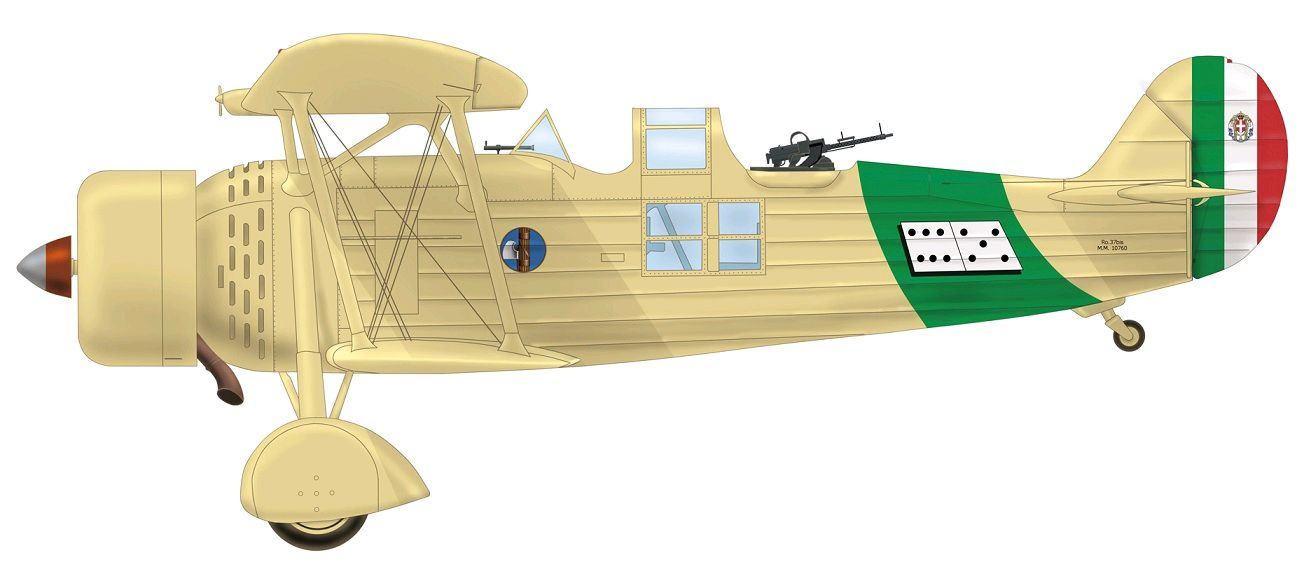
IMAM Ro.37bis of the 105ª Squadriglia AO Regia Aeronautica, the Second Italo-Abyssinian War

In the meantime, the Ro.37 also served in the Spanish Civil War, with the first ten arriving in late 1936. Another 26 (possibly 58) went to this theatre and were used for many missions and tasks. They were used as assault aircraft, even though they were unarmoured. The results were satisfactory and some were even converted to a single-seat machine for use as attack fighters. The two-seat versions were used as heavy fighters, providing protection for S.81 bombers from Republican I-15s. It is not known if there were any air-to-air victories.

The Ro.37 was generally liked by pilots, and the only complaint was that aircraft was prone to damage to the undercarriage, and had some engine faults.

The aircraft was produced until 1939 with a total of 569 (237 + 332bis) produced, and as late as 1940 there were provisions to have 17 Squadron equipped with this machine. In fact, the Ro.37 continued to be used as reconnaissance aircraft for years, since its replacement, the Caproni Ca.311, proved unsatisfactory.

Ro.37s were also quite widely exported (ten to Uruguay, 16 to Afghanistan, 14 to Hungary, eight to Austria, and one to Ecuador) and about 280 were in service in 1940, in thirty squadrons consisting of 215 aircraft.

Some were in service up to 1943 and perhaps even later. They were very vulnerable, but in World War II Italy did not have sufficient resources to produce a better observation aircraft, not even the IMAM Ro.63, a superior aircraft, similar to the Fieseler Fi 156 Storch, but with more endurance.

== Variants ==
Ro.37
Reconnaissance biplane, powered by a 418 kW (560 hp) Fiat A.30 R.A. V-12.
Ro 37bis
Improved version, powered by Piaggio P.IX R.C.40 or Piaggio P.X R. radial engines.
IMAM Ro.43
reconnaissance floatplane for the Regia Marina .
Ro.44
single-seat fighter floatplane for the Regia Marina .
Ro 45
A revised Ro.37, powered by a 611 kW (820 hp) Isotta-Fraschini Asso XI R.C.40 engine. Maximum speed was boosted to 325 km/h (202 mph; 175 kn), ceiling to 000 m (0 ft) and range to 2,250 km (1,398 mi; 1,215 nmi). Designed for long-range reconnaissance and light bombing, the single prototype was 10.37 m (34 ft) long, with a 12.32 m (40 ft) span and first flew on 10 December 1935.

== Operators ==
Kingdom of Afghanistan

- Afghan Air Force

Austria

- Austrian Air Force (1927-1938)

Ecuador

- Ecuadorian Air Force

Hungary

- Hungarian Air Force

Kingdom of Italy

- Regia Aeronautica
- Aviazione Legionaria 36 aircraft

Spain

- Spanish Air Force

Uruguay

- Uruguayan Air Force

== Specifications (Ro.37bis P.IX engine) ==
Data from Italian Civil and Military Aircraft 1930–1945

General characteristics

- Crew: 2
- Length: 8.57 m (28 ft 1.25 in)
- Height: 3.14 m (10 ft 3.75 in)
- Wing area: 31.35 m^{2} (337.4 sq ft)
- Empty weight: 1,587 kg (3,498 lb)
- Max takeoff weight: 2,420 kg (5,335 lb)
- Powerplant: 1 × Piaggio Stella P.IX R.C.40 9-cylinder air-cooled radial piston engine, 418 kW (561 hp)
- Propellers: 2-bladed fixed-pitch propeller

Performance

- Maximum speed: 330 km/h (210 mph, 180 kn) at 5,000 m (16,400 ft)
- Cruise speed: 249 km/h (155 mph, 134 kn) at 5,000 m (16,400 ft)
- Range: 1,120 km (700 mi, 600 nmi)
- Service ceiling: 7,198 m (23,615 ft)
- Time to altitude: 2,000 m (6,560 ft) 4 minutes 10 seconds

4,000 m (13,120 ft) 9 minutes 20 seconds
6,000 m (19,680 ft) 16 minutes 30 seconds

Armament

- Guns:

- 2 × 7.7 mm (0.303 in) fixed forward firing Breda-SAFAT machine guns
- 1 × 7.7 mm (0.303 in) flexibly mounted machine gun in the rear cockpit

- Bombs:

- 180 kg (400 lb) of bombs on fuselage racks

Engine	Length	Weight empty/max	Speed	Climb to 4000 m	Ceiling	Range
Fiat A.30 R.A.	8.62 m (28 ft)	1,563 kg (3,446 lb) / 2,425 kg (5,346 lb)	325 km/h (202 mph; 175 kn)	9 min 5 sec	6,700 m (22,000 ft)	1,650 km (1,030 mi; 890 nmi)
Piaggio P.IX R.C.40	8.57 m (28 ft)	2,040 kg (4,497 lb) / 2,425 kg (5,346 lb)	320 km/h (199 mph; 173 kn)	9 min 30 sec	7,500 m (24,600 ft)	1,300 km (810 mi; 700 nmi)
Piaggio P.X R.	8.57 m (28 ft)	2,040 kg (4,497 lb) / 2,425 kg (5,346 lb)	320 km/h (199 mph; 173 kn)	9 min 30 sec	7,500 m (24,600 ft)	1,300 km (810 mi; 700 nmi)

== See also ==
Aircraft of comparable role, configuration, and era

- Heinkel He 46
- Polikarpov R-5
- Weiss Manfred WM.21 Sólyom

Related lists

- List of Afghan Air Force aircraft
- List of Interwar military aircraft

== Bibliography ==
- Angelucci, Enzo and Paolo Matricardi. World Aircraft: World War II, Volume I (Sampson Low Guides). Maidenhead, UK: Sampson Low, 1978. ISBN 0-562-00096-8.
- (in Italian) Bignozzi, Giorgio. Aerei d'Italia. Milano, Edizioni E.C.A 2000
- Arrez Cerda, Juan (April 2000). "Le Romeo Ro.37bis en Espagne" [The Romeo Ro.37bis in Spain]. Avions: Toute l'Aéronautique et son histoire (in French) (85): 38–43. ISSN 1243-8650.
- Arrez Cerda, Juan (May 2000). "Le Romeo Ro.37bis en Espagne". Avions: Toute l'Aéronautique et son histoire (in French) (86): 22–32. ISSN 1243-8650.
- Arrez Cerda, Juan (June 2000). "Le Romeo Ro.37bis en Espagne". Avions: Toute l'Aéronautique et son histoire (in French) (87): 36–37. ISSN 1243-8650.
- Cull, Brian with Frederick Galea. 249 at Malta: Malta top-scoring Fighter Squadron 1941–1943. Malta, Wise Owl Publications, 2004. ISBN 978-99932-32-52-0
- (in Italian) De Marchi, Italo – Tonizzo, Pietro. CANT. Z. 506 "airone"- CANT. Z. 1007 "alcione" . Modena, Mucchi Editorr, 1997. NO ISBN.
- Domange, Yves (February 1999). "Quand les démocraties occidentales achetaient des avions dans l'Italie fasciste... (1^{ère} partie: la France)" [When Western Democracies Bought Their Aircraft from Fascist Italy... (Part 1: France)]. Avions: Toute l'Aéronautique et son histoire (in French) (71): 16–24. ISSN 1243-8650.
- Green, William. War Planes of the Second World War: Volume Six – Floatplanes. London:Macdonald, 1962.
- (in English) Gunston, Bill. Gli aerei della seconda guerra mondiale. Milano, Alberto Peruzzo Editore, 1984
- Gunston, Bill (2001), The Illustrated Directory of Fighting Aircraft of World War II, Salamander, ISBN 1-84065-092-3
- Marcon, Tullio L'aviazione per il regio esercito Storia Militare magazine July 1995. (in Italian)
- Mondey, David (1984), The Concise Guide to Axis Aircraft of World War II, Chancellor Press, ISBN 1 85152 966 7
- Mondey, David. The Hamlyn Concise Guide to Axis Aircraft of World War II. London: Bounty Books, 2006. ISBN 0-7537-1460-4.
- The Illustrated Encyclopedia of Aircraft (Part Work 1982–1985), 1985, Orbis Publishing
- Sapienza, Antonio Luis & Luzardo, Eduardo (August 2001). "Le Romeo Ro.37 dans l'aviation militaire uruguayenne (1937–1945)" [The Romeo Ro.37 in the Uruguayan Air Force]. Avions: Toute l'Aéronautique et son histoire (in French) (101): 21–23. ISSN 1243-8650.
