= Fiat CR.30 =

Italian biplane fighter

CR.30
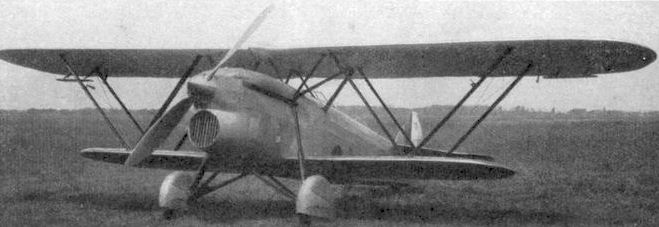

General information
- Type: Single-seat fighter biplane
- Manufacturer: Fiat
- Designer: Celestino Rosatelli
- Primary users: Regia Aeronautica Hungarian Air Force
- Number built: 201

History
- Manufactured: 1932-1935
- Introduction date: 1932
- First flight: March 1932
- Variant: Fiat CR.32

The Fiat CR.30 was a 1930s Italian single-seat biplane fighter aircraft designed by Celestino Rosatelli and built by Fiat.

== Design and development ==
The Fiat CR.30 was a new design by Celestino Rosatelli for a single-seat fighter. Four prototypes were built with the first flight occurring in March 1932. The CR.30 was a biplane with W-form interplane struts and a fixed tailwheel landing gear. The aircraft was powered by a 447 kW (600 hp) Fiat A.30 R.A. V-12 piston engine. Two prototypes were entered into an international meeting in Zurich in July 1932 and won the speed circuit contest at average speeds of 340 km/h (211 mph) and 330 km/h (205 mph). The impressive performance led to orders from the Regia Aeronautica (Royal Italian Air Force) for 121 aircraft.

Two of the prototypes were converted into two-seaters designated CR.30B for use as refresher trainers and liaison aircraft. A large number of single-seaters were converted into two-seaters as they were replaced with more modern equipment. The air force later ordered an additional 20 new-build CR.30Bs. Two aircraft were converted to seaplanes with the designation CR.30 Idro. The aircraft was also operated by other European air forces with the Hungarian Air Force being the largest foreign operator, using two CR.30s from 1936 and one single-seater and ten CR.30bs from 1938.

== Variants ==
CR.30
Single-seat production variant.
CR.30B
Two-seat variant.
CR.30 Idro
Seaplane variant.

== Operators ==
Austria

- Austrian Air Force received three CR.30 and three CR.30B aircraft.

China

- Chinese Nationalist Air Force

Germany

- Luftwaffe operated captured former Austrian aircraft.

Hungary

- Royal Hungarian Air Force

Kingdom of Italy

- Regia Aeronautica

Paraguay

- Paraguayan Air Force operated two aircraft from 1939 as advanced trainers.

Spanish State

- Spanish Nationalist Air Force operated two CR.30s from 1938.

Venezuela

- Venezuelan Air Force operated one CR.30 from 1938.

== Specifications (CR.30) ==
Orthographic line drawing of the Fiat CR.30

Data from The Illustrated Encyclopedia of Aircraft (Part Work 1982-1985), 1985, Orbis Publishing, Page 1794

General characteristics

- Crew: one
- Length: 7.88 m (25 ft 7.25 in)
- Wingspan: 10.50 m (34 ft 5.5 in)
- Height: 2.78 m (9 ft 1.5 in)
- Wing area: 27.05 m^{2} (291.17 sq ft)
- Empty weight: 1,345 kg (2,965 lb)
- Gross weight: 1,895 kg (4,178 lb)
- Powerplant: 1 × Fiat A.30 R.A. 12-cylinder Vee piston engine , 447 kW (600 hp)

Performance

- Maximum speed: 351 km/h (218 mph, 189 kn)
- Range: 850 km (528 mi, 459 nmi)
- Service ceiling: 8,350 m (27,845 ft)

Armament

- 2 × Breda-SAFAT 7.7 mm (0.303 in) machine guns (synchronised forward-firing)

== See also ==
Related development

- Fiat CR.32

Related lists

- List of Interwar military aircraft

== Bibliography ==
- Sapienza, Antonio Luis (September 1994). "Les chasseurs Fiat au Paraguay" [Paraguayan Fiat Fighters]. Avions: Toute l'aéronautique et son histoire (in French) (19): 9–13. ISSN 1243-8650.
- The Illustrated Encyclopedia of Aircraft (Part Work 1982–1985), 1985, Orbis Publishing, Page 1794
