= Celestino Rosatelli =

Italian aeronautics engineer

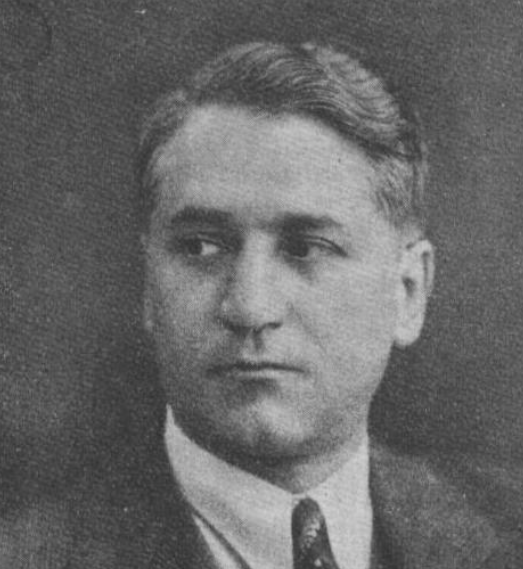
Celestino Rosatelli

Celestino Rosatelli (8 April 1885 – 23 September 1945) was an Italian aeronautics engineer.

Celestino Rosatelli was born in Belmonte in Sabina, close to Rieti, to Bernardino Rosatelli and Apollonia Santini. His parents noticed his brilliant mathematical skills and were able to support his studies. Sent to Rome to study engineering, he graduated in 1910. Afterwards, he designed aircraft in Turin for Fiat.

Rosatelli designed some of the most advanced aircraft of his time, such as the Fiat CR.42 and Fiat BR.20.

He died in Turin in 1945.
