= Fiat CR.32 =

Italian biplane fighter

CR.32
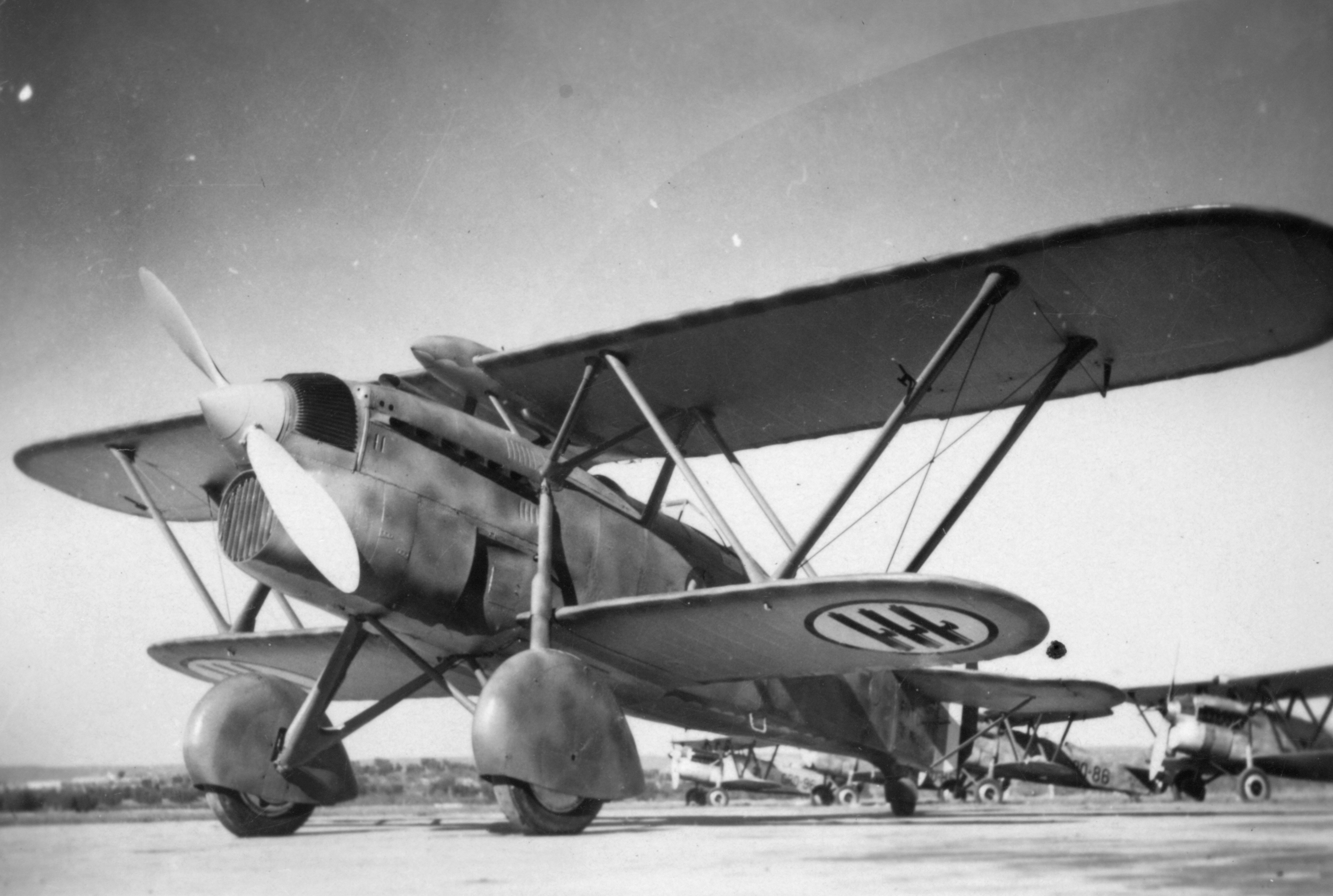
- CR.32 of Regia Aeronautica in 1939

General information
- Type: Fighter
- Manufacturer: Fiat
- Designer: Celestino Rosatelli
- Status: Retired
- Primary users: Regia Aeronautica Hungarian Air Force; Spanish Air Force; Chinese Nationalist Air Force
- Number built: 1,052

History
- Manufactured: c. March 1934 – 1938
- Introduction date: 1933
- First flight: 28 April 1933
- Retired: 1953, Spanish Air Force
- Developed from: Fiat CR.30
- Developed into: Fiat CR.42 Falco

The Fiat CR.32 was an Italian biplane fighter used in the Spanish Civil War and the Second World War. Designed by the aeronautical engineer Celestino Rosatelli, it was a compact, robust and highly manoeuvrable aircraft for its era, leading to it being a relatively popular fighter during the 1930s.

The CR.32 fought in North and East Africa, in Albania, and in the Mediterranean theatre. It was extensively used in the Spanish Civil War, where it gained a reputation as one of the most outstanding fighter biplanes of all time. It also saw service in the air forces of China, Austria, Hungary, Paraguay and Venezuela. It frequently performed impressive displays all over Europe in the hands of the Italian Pattuglie Acrobatiche. During the late 1930s, the CR.32 was overtaken by more advanced monoplane designs; by the start of the Second World War, it was considered to be obsolete. While it had been superseded by a number of newer Italian fighters, including the newer Fiat CR.42 Falco which had been derived from the CR.32, the type continued to be flown throughout the conflict.

== Development ==
The Fiat CR.32 was designed by the aeronautical engineer Celestino Rosatelli. It was derived from the earlier Fiat CR.30, which had received limited production orders from the Regia Aeronautica but, within the space of 12 months, it was superseded by the newer CR.32. The CR.32 had a smaller and more streamlined fuselage than the CR.30, resulting in a more compact aircraft.

On 28 April 1933, the prototype CR.32, which was designated the MM.201, made its maiden flight from the Fiat company airfield at Turin. By the end of the year, the first production examples were already arriving with front line units of the Regia Aeronautica. Mass production of the type took place between 1933 and 1938. Four variants of the CR.32 were developed: the standard, bis, ter, and quater. The CR.32 bis had a more powerful Fiat A.30R V12 engine and two additional machine guns, while the ter and the quater retained the original armament, differing in the use of improved gunsights and instrumentation.

By 1938, the CR.32 had been rendered obsolete by advances in the field of aviation, including the arrival of a new generation of monoplane fighters, which were capable of superior performance. The CR.32 was directly succeeded by the Fiat CR.42 Falco, which was derived from the CR.32. During the development of this design, four CR.32s were converted to serve as prototypes.

== Design ==
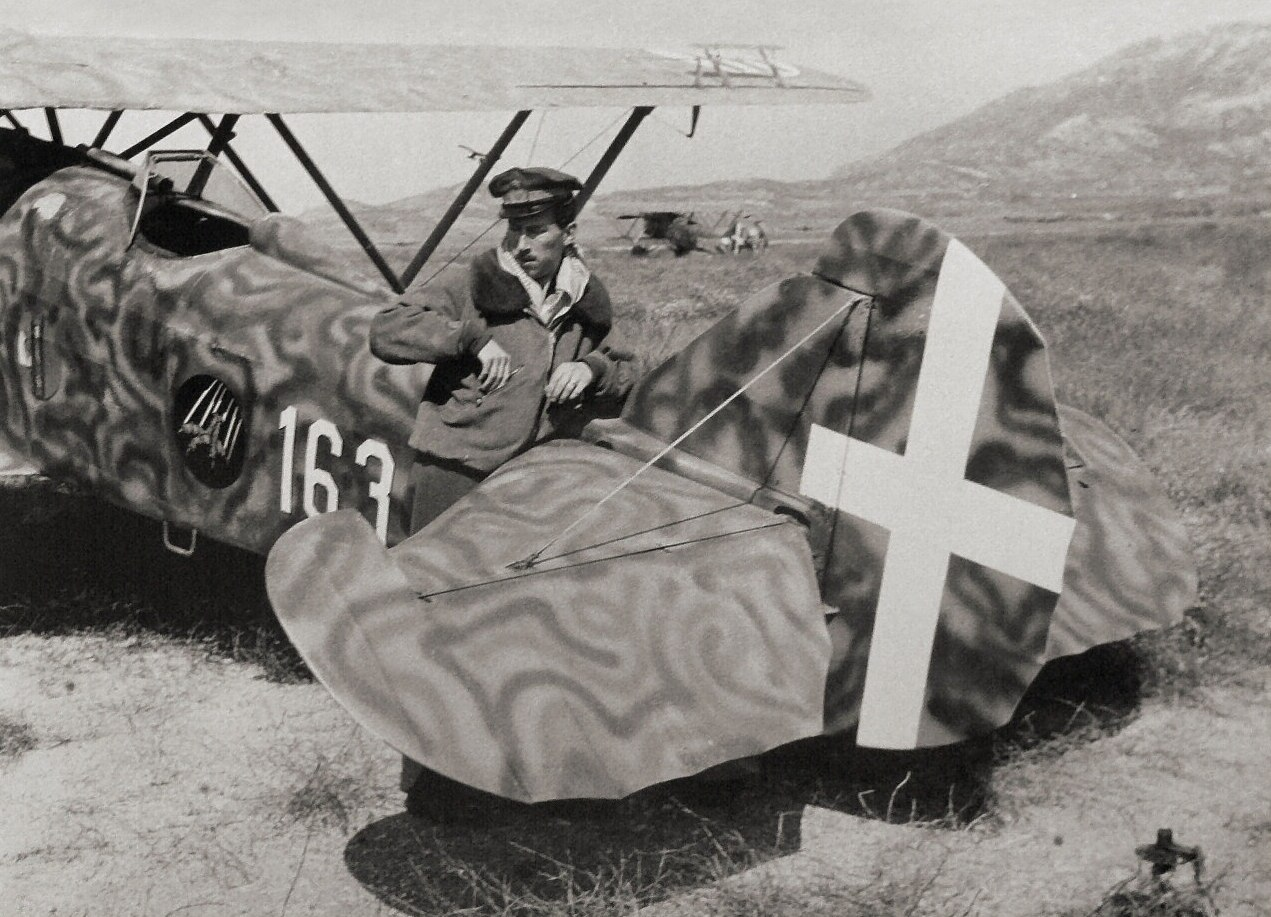
Capt. Mario D'Agostini standing next to the rear of his CR.32, 1940

The Fiat CR.32's fuselage had the same structure as the earlier CR.30, using aluminium and steel tubes covered by duraluminium on the nose up to the cockpit, on the back, in the lower section under the tail, while a fabric covering was used on the sides and belly. According to Cattaneo, the fuselage was very robust for the time. The CR.32 had a fixed undercarriage with hydraulic shock absorbers; the wheels were housed in fairings and braking was pneumatically activated.

The wings and tail used a mixed composition, similar to the fuselage, composed of a pair of aluminium alloy tubular spars and square tubes, which were covered by fabric. It was a sesquiplane, the lower wing being shorter than the upper wing. The interplane struts were arranged to form a pair of Warren trusses on either side. Ailerons were only present upon the upper wings, which were balanced by out-rigged tabs mounted on steel struts. The empennage, which was largely composed of aluminium tubes, had a variable incidence tailplane and an aerodynamically-balanced elevator.

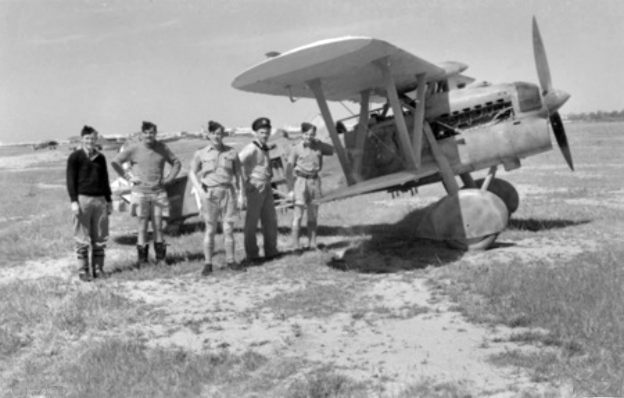
Members of the Royal Australian Air Force besides a captured CR.32 in Benghazi, Libya, 1941

The cockpit of the CR.32 had an adjustable seat and a parachute, the latter of which was stored within the squab. Although it was considered to be fully instrumented for the era, the RA.80-1 radio set was only an optional piece of equipment. Other equipment included a fire extinguisher, gun camera, and an oxygen system for the pilot; both an optical gunsight and survey camera could also be installed as optional item. The armament initially included a pair of 7.7 mm (.030 in) Breda-SAFAT machine guns (which was later replaced with a pair of 12.7 mm (.5 in) Breda-SAFAT guns), which were fitted on top of the engine cowling; each gun had an ammo capacity of 350 rounds. Later examples were also furnished with a pair of hard points, which could accommodate up to twelve 5lb bombs, a pair of 100lb bombs, or a single 200lb bomb.

The CR.32 was powered by a single water-cooled Fiat A.30 R.A. V12 engine. Designed in 1930, it was a 60° V 12, producing up to 447 kW (600 hp) at 2,600 rpm, reportedly inspired by the American Curtiss D-12. It drove a 2.82 meter (9 ft 4 in) two-blade metal propeller with pitch only adjustable on the ground, not in flight. The engine did not use the usual aviation gasoline, but instead ran on a mixture of petrol (55%), ethanol (23%) and benzol (22%). The main fuel tank, which was located between the engine and cockpit, carried 325 litres (85.9 US gal). There was another small 25 liter (6.6 US gal) auxiliary tank positioned in a streamlined fairing in the center of the upper wing.

== Operational history ==
=== Early operations ===
The new biplane proved to be an instant success. After a brief period of testing, the first production orders for the CR.32 were received during March 1934. Within a short amount of time, the type soon equipped the 1°, 3° and 4° Stormi of the Regia Aeronautica. The CR.32 was commonly well liked by its crews, being very maneuverable and benefitting from a relatively strong fuselage structure.

The Fiat biplanes were used for many aerobatic shows, in Italy and abroad. When foreign statesmen visited Rome, the 4° Stormo, Regia Aeronautica élite unit put on impressive displays with formations of five or ten aircraft. During 1936, air shows were organized above various other European capitals and major cities, and, during the following year, in South America. When the team returned, a brilliant display was put on in Berlin. Further overseas tours by Italian display teams, such as a South American expedition in 1938, were performed using the type. The CR.32's tight turning circle and excellent handling made the type ideal for aerobatic displays.

The CR.32 was noted for high maneuverability and gained widespread popularity among its pilots. Aviation historians argue that its combat success contributed to the Regia Aeronautica's continued commitment to biplane development, delaying the adoption of more modern monoplane fighters.

=== Spain ===
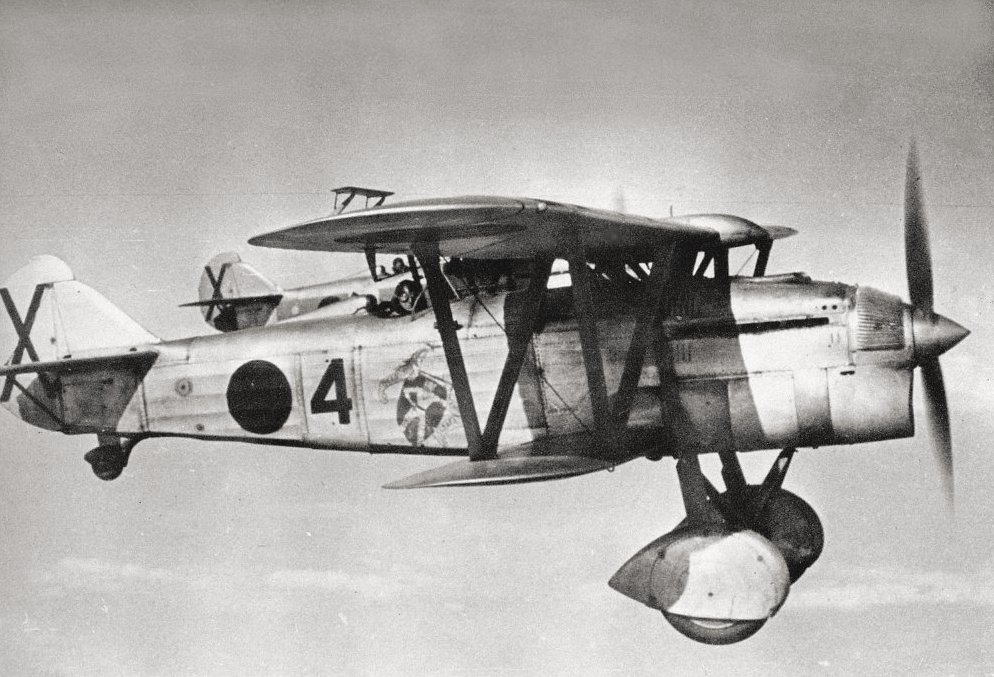
A pair of Fiat C.R.32 of the X Gruppo "Baleari".

During 1938, Spain acquired a license to build the CR.32. Spanish manufacturer Hispano Aviación established a production line and constructed at least 100 examples, which were locally known under the designation HA-132-L Chirri. Some of these aircraft remained in military service as C.1 aerobatic trainers up until as late as 1953.

The Fiat CR.32 was used extensively in the Spanish Civil War on the side of the Fascist military rebellion against the Spanish Republic. At least 380 examples took part in the air battles fought over Spain, proving formidable adversaries to the Soviet Polikarpov I-15 biplane and Polikarpov I-16 monoplane that formed the backbone of the Spanish Republican Air Force. During 1936, the type had its baptism of fire. On 18 August, the first 12 CR.32s arrived in Spain and formed the Squadriglia Gamba di Ferro, Cucaracha, and Asso di Bastoni of 3° Stormo; three days later Tenente Vittorino Ceccherelli, a Gold Medal of Military Valor winner, shot down the first enemy aircraft, a Nieuport 52, over Cordoba. In total, the Italian government dispatched between 365 and 405 C.R.32s to Spain while between 127 and 131 were delivered directly to Nationalist aviation units. During the conflict, six aircraft were captured by Republican forces, according to Nico, one of these was shipped to the Soviet Union, where it underwent a detailed evaluation.

Thanks to the agile CR.32, the Italians managed to achieved air superiority over their Fuerzas Aéreas de la República Española opponents, who flew a motley collection of very different and often obsolete aircraft. The Fiat biplane proved to be effective in the theatre, the Aviazione Legionaria claiming 60 (48 confirmed) modern Russian Tupolev SB bombers, which were once believed to be impossible to intercept, as well as 242 Polikarpov I-15 biplane fighters, and 240 Polikarpov I-16 monoplane fighters, plus another hundred aircraft that were not confirmed. In exchange, C.R.32 losses were reportedly only 73. According to other sources, of the 376 Fiat shipped to Spain, 175 (43 Spanish operated and 132 Italian) were lost, including 99 (26 Spanish and 73 Italian) shot down, while, by January 1939, the number of I-15s shot down was just 88.

==== Spanish aces ====
The top scoring CR.32 ace was Spaniard Joaquín García Morato y Castaño, who was the leading Nationalist fighter pilot of the Spanish Civil War. He achieved 36 of his 40 victories while flying the Fiat biplane. He used the same aircraft, which carried the number 3-51 on the fuselage, until his death. During April 1939, shortly after the war had finished, Morato fatally crashed his faithful 3-51 while performing low aerobatics.

Another Nationalist CR.32 ace was Capitán Manuel Vázquez Sagastizábal, who claimed 21 1/3 victories with Grupo 2-G-3, before he was shot down and killed on 23 January 1939. Comandante Angel Salas Larrazabal, after one kill flying a Nieuport-Delage 52, flew multiple CR.32s, shooting down, on 29 October 1936, the first of the fast Soviet monoplane Tupolev SB-2 bombers to fall to Nationalist fighters. He shot down four more aircraft with the CR.32 before moving to a Heinkel He 51 unit. After two more victories, he joined the new Grupo 2-G-3. With this unit, again flying CR.32s, he raised his score to 16, including three SB-2s and an I-16 in a single sortie on 2 September 1938. Capitán Miguel Guerrero Garcia achieved nine of his 13 victories flying the Fiat biplane: four I-15s, three "Papagayos" (R-5s and Polikarpov-RZs assault bombers), and two I-16s.

=== Second World War ===
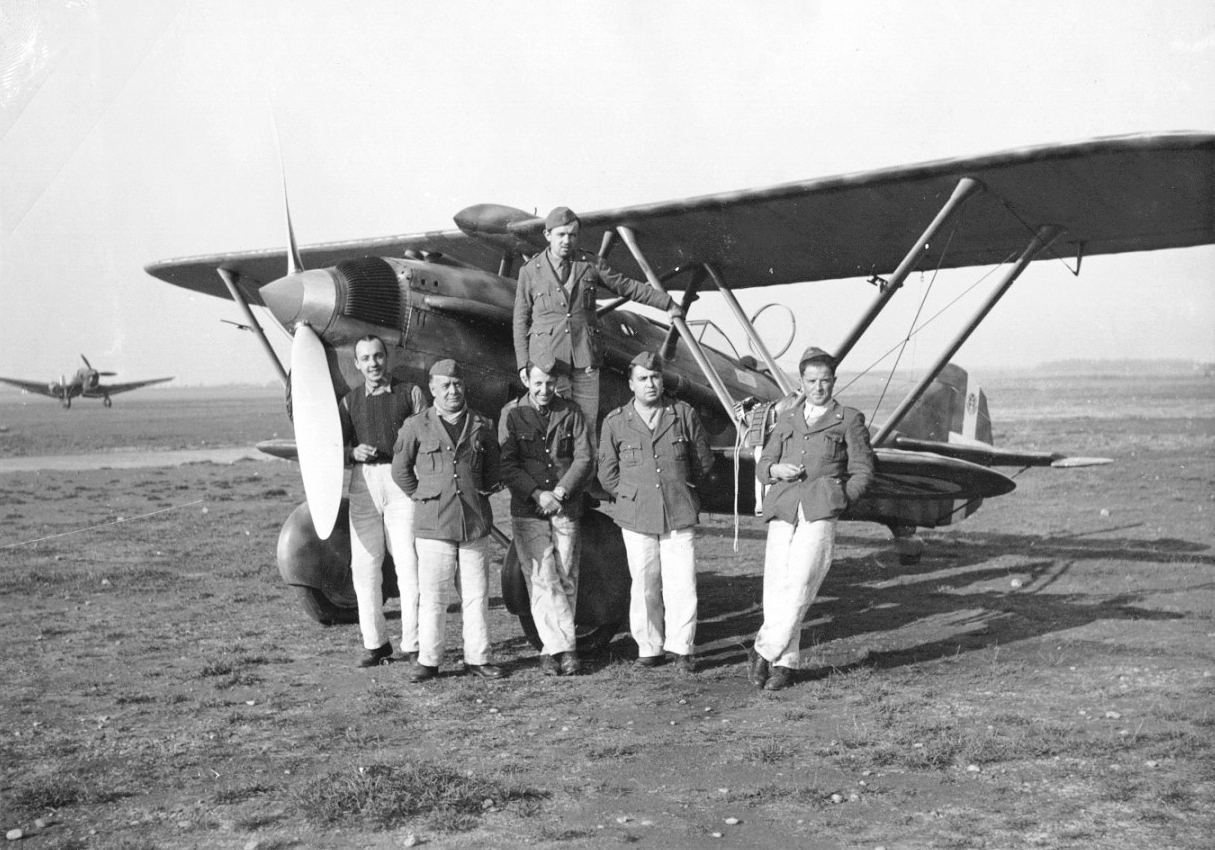
A CR.32 in 1940–1942.

The aerobatic characteristics of the CR.32 and its success in Spain misled the Italian air ministry, which was convinced that a biplane fighter still had potential as a weapon of war. Consequently, during May 1939, prior to Italy entering the Second World War, CR.32 fighters, in bis, ter, and quater versions, represented two-thirds of all fighters in the Regia Aeronautica. A total of 288 were based in Italy and North Africa, while 24 were stationed in East Africa.

==== North Africa ====
When Italy declared war on Britain and France on 10 June 1940, 36 CR.32s together with 51 Fiat CR.42s formed the operational fighter force of the Regia Aeronautica in Libya. The first combat between CR.32s and British aircraft came the following day. Six CR.32s intercepted a formation of Bristol Blenheim bombers attacking the airfield at El Adem, claiming two Blenheims shot down and the remaining four damaged (compared with actual British losses of two Blenheims lost and two damaged), for no losses. According to Cattaneo, instead of focusing on air-to-air dogfighting, CR.32 pilots typically engaged in strafing ground targets, acting as light attack aircraft instead; he stated these activities to have been of "limited effectiveness" in the campaign.

==== East Africa ====
Some of the CR.32s most important achievements were accomplished in Italian East Africa. Here, 410^{a} and 411^{a} Squadriglia CR.32s (which represented half of all the fighters operational in the Italian colony) destroyed a number of British and South African aircraft. Despite being slower and less heavily armed than monoplanes such as the Hawker Hurricane and Bristol Blenheim, the CR.32 was capable of engaging these aircraft effectively, depending partly on the pilot's skill and the tactical conditions.

The Fiats received their baptism of fire on 17 June, when CR. 32s of 411^{a} Squadriglia flown by Tenente Aldo Meoli and Maresciallo Bossi attacked three South African Air Force Junkers Ju 86 bombers bound for Yavello, escorted by two Hurricanes of 1 SAAF Squadron. The Fiat CR.32s shot down one of the Ju 86s and then pounced on the Hurricanes, shooting down the one flown by 2/Lt B.L. Griffiths, who was killed in the crash. On the 7th of July, three CR.32s, escorting as many Caproni Ca.133s, intercepted three Hawker Hartebeests, and shot down the plane flown by Lt N.K. Rankin, killing the pilot and his gunner, Air Sgt D.H. Hughes. On 23 February 1941, while in the process of attacking the airfield at Makale, Maj Laurie Wilmot, who was flying a Hurricane, was bounced by Italian ace Alberto Veronese in a Fiat biplane. Wilmot was forced to crash-land, becoming a prisoner of war (PoW). Soon after, Capt Andrew Duncan hit Veronese, who was wounded and bailed out. The CR.32s obtained other kills, despite having to face an ever increasing number of more modern aircraft.

The 410^{a} Squadriglia alone managed to shoot down 14 enemy aircraft, before being disbanded. But the impossibility of obtaining replacements and spare parts from the motherland caused the gradual thinning of the rows of CR.32s. On 10 January 1941 there were still 22 CR.32s in service, on 31 January there were 14, on 10 February 11 and on 5 March just eight. The last CR.32 survived until mid-April 1941.

==== Mediterranean ====
Fourteen CR.32s of 160° Gruppo and nine of 2° Gruppo from 6° Stormo saw action against Greece in the first weeks after the attack of 28 October 1940. Eight more from 163^{a}a Squadriglia, based at Gadurrà airport on Rhodes, took part in the invasion of Crete. CR.32s of 3° Gruppo operated in Sardinia, but in the period of July–December 1940 their number fell from 28 to seven serviceable aircraft. Cattaneo observed that ground crews lacked the fuel, ammunition, and spare components to properly maintain their aircraft, often resorting to improvisation due to the poor supply situation, which severely impacted the fighter's operational effectiveness. The last front line CR.32 survived until mid-April 1941 when they were sent to the Scuola Caccia (Schools for fighter pilots). By 1942, the type was relegated to only night missions as newer fighters were put into service.

=== International use ===
==== China ====
The first international operator of the CR.32 was Chiang Kai-shek's for China, which ordered 16 (according to other sources 24) CR.32s of the first series in 1933. The aircraft mounted Vickers 7.7 mm machine guns instead of the Breda-SAFAT, electric headlights, and the cooling fins on the oil tank in the nose were removed. Additionally, some were equipped with radios. They were based at Nangahang airport, near Shanghai. Some officers of the Chinese high command disliked the Fiat, but Chinese pilots appreciated that the Italian biplanes in comparative tests proved superior to the American Curtiss Hawk and Boeing P-26. The Chinese Government did not order more CR.32s as it was difficult to import alcohol and benzole to mix with petrol for the engines. In May 1936, only six CR.32s were still operational. In August 1937, the remaining CR.32s were used with some initial success in Shanghai against the invading Japanese. By late 1937, when the Chinese capital at Nanjing fell, all CR.32s had been lost.

==== Austria ====
In spring 1936, 45 CR.32s were ordered by Austria to equip Jagdgeschwader II at Wiener Neustadt. In March 1938, following the Anschluss with neighbouring Nazi Germany, the Austrian units were absorbed into the Luftwaffe, and, after a brief period, the 36 remaining aircraft were handed over to Hungary.

==== Hungary ====
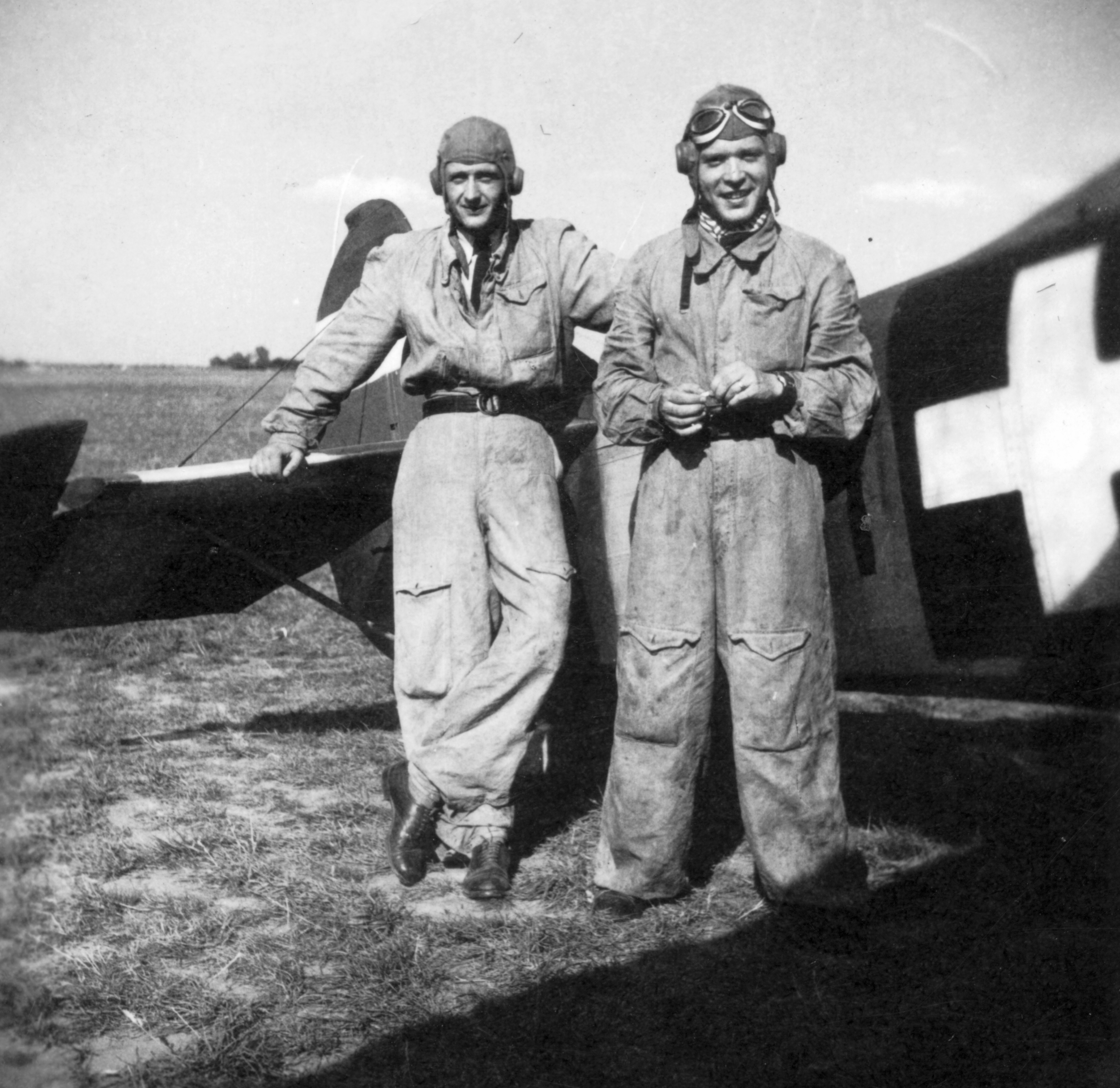
Members of the Royal Hungarian Air Force (MKHL) next to a CR.32, 1943

The Magyar Királyi Honvéd Légierő, the Royal Hungarian Air Force (MKHL), acquired a total of 76 CR.32s during 1935 and 1936. MKHL Fiat biplanes had their baptism of fire in 1939, during the short conflict with the newly-formed state of Slovakia. The CR.32s, which were emblazoned with the red/white/green chevrons insignia, easily gained air superiority over the fledgling Slovak Air Force, which lost a few Avia B.534s and Letov S-328s during this action.

During the short conflict against Yugoslavia, fought in April 1941, the MKHL lost three CR.32s and, on 6 May 1941, the Hungarian Air Force still had 69 Fiat CR.32s on line. In June 1941, when the Kingdom of Hungary declared war on the Soviet Union, the CR.32 fighter equipped two of the units that supported the Hungarian Army on the Eastern Front: 1./I Group of 1st Fighter Wing, based in Szolnok, and 2./I Group, of 2nd Fighter Wing, based at Nyíregyháza. On 29 June, the first aerial combat over Hungary took place, when seven Tupolev SB-2 bombers attacked the railway station at Csap and were intercepted by the Fiat CR.32s from 2/3 Fighter squadron. The Fiat biplanes shot down three of the raiders while incurring no loss to themselves.

Following the acquisition of newer fighters, including the Fiat CR.42 and Reggiane Re.2000, the remaining Hungarian CR.32s were relegated being used for training missions only.

==== South Africa ====
A CR.32 was captured intact at Addis Adaba, made flyable and was sent to Zwartkop Air Station in August 1941. The CR.32 went on a public tour and then joined 6 Squadron in April 1942, serving as a hack. In November 1942 the plane was transferred to the Natal University Air Training Squadron, eventually being scrapped in 1945.

==== South America ====
In 1938, Venezuela acquired nine CR.32quaters (according to other sources, 10 aircraft.) Modifications included a larger radiator to assist engine cooling in tropical climate conditions. The aircraft were delivered to Maracay in the second half of 1938 and equipped the 1° Regimiento de Aviación Militar del Venezuela. With five CR.32s still serviceable, the aircraft were struck off charge in 1943.

A small number, estimated at four, went to Paraguay in 1938. Five CR.32quater fighters (registered 1-1, 1-3, 1-5, 1-7 and 1-9) were assigned to 1.a Escuadrilla de Caza of the Fuerzas Aéreas del Ejército Nacional del Paraguay. They did not arrive in time for military operations against Bolivia, but were in service for several years.

== Variants ==
The Regia Aeronautica ordered 1,080 CR.32s (including the two prototypes and 23 aircraft rebuilt by SCA factory in Guidonia, near Rome, plus 52 without military registry numbers for Hungary). With 100 more CR.32quaters licence-built in Spain (as the Hispano Ha. 132L Chirri), the total CR.32 production numbers range from 1,306 to 1,332 examples.

CR.32
Armed with twin 7.7 mm (.303 in) or 12.7 mm (.5 in) machine guns and powered by 447 kW (600 hp) Fiat A.30 R.A.bis engine. Delivered to the Regia Aeronautica between March 1934 and February 1936.
CR.32bis
Close-support fighter version armed with twin Breda-SAFAT Mod.1928Av. 7.7 mm (.303 in) (a common field modification was to discard the 7.7 mm armament to reduce weight) and twin 12.7 mm (.5 in) machine guns. Bomb racks with ability to carry 100 kg (220 lb) bombload possible: 1 × 100 kg (220 lb) or 2 × 50 kg (110 lb).
CR.32ter
Revised CR.32bis with a gun-sight, strengthened undercarriage and removal of wing-mounted guns.
CR.32quater
Revised CR.32ter with reduced weight, added radio and max speed 356 km/h (221 mph) at 3,000 m (9,843 ft); 337 built for the Regia Aeronautica.
CR.33
520 kW (700 hp) Fiat AC.33RC engine. Maximum speed 412 km/h (256 mph; 222 kn) at 3,500 m (11,500 ft). Only three prototypes were built.
CR.40
One prototype powered by a Bristol Mercury IV radial engine.
CR.40bis
One prototype only.
CR.41
One prototype only.
HA-132L Chirri
Spanish version; 100 were built and 49 more of those used during the war were rebuilt. A total of 40 were transformed into two-seaters and kept in service as an aerobatic trainer till 1953.

== Operators ==
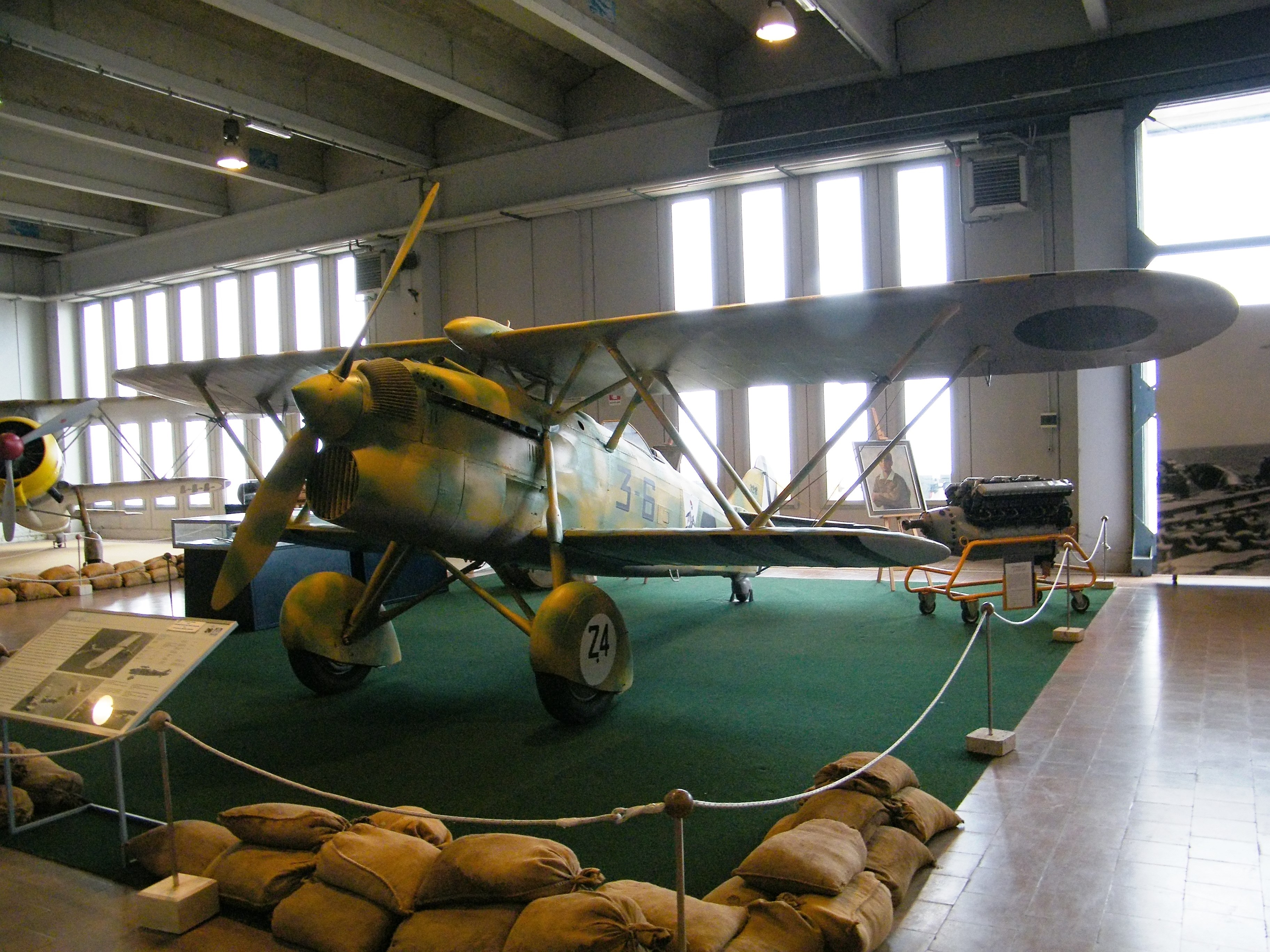
Fiat C.R.32 at the Vigna di Valle air museum in 2012.

Austria

- Austrian Air Force received 45 CR.32bis aircraft

China

- Chinese Nationalist Air Force

Germany

- Luftwaffe operated former Austrian aircraft

Hungary

- Royal Hungarian Air Force

Kingdom of Italy

- Regia Aeronautica
- Aviazione Legionaria
- Italian Co-Belligerent Air Force

Paraguay

- Paraguayan Air Arm ordered five aircraft in 1938.

Spanish State

- Spanish Air Force

Spanish Republic

- Operated captured aircraft

Italy

- Aeronautica Nazionale Repubblicana

Venezuela

- Venezuelan Air Force ordered nine aircraft in 1938.

== Surviving aircraft ==
- C.1-328 – HA-132L on static display at the Italian Air Force Museum in Bracciano, Lazio. It was donated by the Spanish Air Force in 1955.
- Composite – HA-132 on static display at the Museo del Aire in Cuatro Vientos, Madrid.
- CR32 MM4666 in colours of 92sqd.on static display at the Italian Air Force in Codroipo, Udine

== Specifications (CR.32) ==
3-view drawing of Fiat CR.32

Data from The Fiat CR.32

General characteristics

- Crew: 1
- Length: 7.47 m (24 ft 6 in)
- Wingspan: 9.5 m (31 ft 2 in)
- Wing area: 22.1 m^{2} (238 sq ft)
- Empty weight: 1,455 kg (3,208 lb)
- Gross weight: 1,975 kg (4,354 lb)
- Powerplant: 1 × Fiat A.30 R.A.bis V-12 liquid-cooled piston engine, 447 kW (599 hp)

Performance

- Maximum speed: 360 km/h (220 mph, 190 kn)
- Range: 781 km (485 mi, 422 nmi)
- Service ceiling: 8,800 m (28,900 ft)
- Rate of climb: 9 m/s (1,800 ft/min)

Armament

- Guns: 2 × 7.7 mm (0.303 in) or 12.7 mm (0.500 in) Breda-SAFAT machine guns
- Bombs: Up to 100 kg (220 lb)

== See also ==
Related development

- Fiat CR.30
- Fiat CR.42 Falco

Aircraft of comparable role, configuration, and era

- Arado Ar 68
- Hawker Fury
- Heinkel He 51
- Polikarpov I-15

Related lists

- List of interwar military aircraft
- List of aircraft of Italy in World War II
- List of aircraft of World War II
