= Caproni Ca.5 =

Italian heavy bomber of World War I

Ca.5
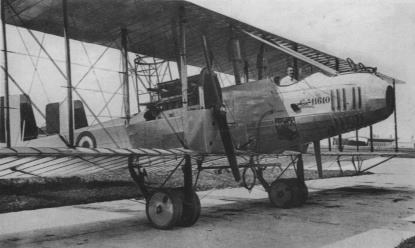

General information
- Type: Heavy bomber
- National origin: Italy
- Manufacturer: Caproni
- Status: Retired
- Primary user: Corpo Aeronautico Militare
- Number built: 662

History
- Manufactured: 1917–1921
- First flight: 1917

The Caproni Ca.5 was an Italian heavy bomber of World War I and the postwar era. It was the final version of the series of aircraft that began with the Caproni Ca.1 in 1914.

== Development ==
By late World War I, developments in aircraft technology made older bomber designs unable to penetrate targets defended by modern fighters. Caproni's response to this problem was to uprate the power significantly on the existing Ca.3 design, with some versions of the Ca.5 eventually carrying engines with nearly five times the total power that the first Ca.1 had.

Apart from greater power, various refinements were made to the design, including modifications to the main nacelle and undercarriage, and completely new wings. The first prototype flew in late 1917 and the type remained in production until 1921. Some 659 of all versions were built by Caproni, and another three were licence-built in the US (two Ca.44s by Standard, and one Ca.46 by Fisher). Planned licensed production in France was cancelled with the end of the war.

During the war, Caproni designated these aircraft according to the total power of their engines. Afterwards, the company redesignated them.

== Design ==
The Ca.5 was a three-engine biplane of a wooden construction, covered with fabric. The crew of four was placed in an open central nacelle (front gunner, two pilots and rear gunner-mechanic). The rear gunner manned upper machine guns, standing upon the central engine in a protective "cage", just before a propeller.

Armament consisted of two to four Revelli 6.5 mm or 7.7 mm machine guns, one on a front ring mount and one, two or sometimes even three on an upper ring mount. Bombs were suspended under the hull.

== Variants ==
- Ca.44 - main production version, originally powered by three Fiat A.12 engines of 149 kW (200 hp) each, hence the name Caproni 600 hp. Later, the A-12bis was used, and aircraft so equipped were known as Caproni 600/900 hps
- Ca.45 - variant selected for French service, powered by three Isotta Fraschini V.6s of 186 kW (250 hp) each. (Caproni 600/750 hp, or simply Caproni 750 hp)
- Ca.46 - late-war variant with three 269 kW (360 hp) Liberty engines.
- Ca.47 - (or I.Ca) seaplane version of Ca.44 (ten built)
- Ca.50 - Ca.44s modified as air ambulances
- Ca.57 - (or Breda M-1) - airliner conversion of war-surplus Ca.44s.

== Operators ==
Kingdom of Italy

- Corpo Aeronautico Militare

United States

- United States Navy

== Specifications (Ca.44) ==
Data from

General characteristics

- Crew: four (pilot, co-pilot, front gunner, and rear gunner/mechanic)
- Length: 12.6 m (41 ft 4 in)
- Wingspan: 23.4 m (76 ft 9 in)
- Wing area: 150 m^{2} (1,600 sq ft)
- Max takeoff weight: 4,600 kg (10,141 lb)
- Powerplant: 3 × Fiat A.12 6-cyl. water-cooled in-line piston engine, 149 kW (200 hp) each

Performance

- Maximum speed: 160 km/h (99 mph, 86 kn)

Armament

- Guns: 2 × 6.5 mm (0.256 in) or 7.7 mm (0.303 in) FIAT-Revelli machine guns
- Bombs: 533 kg (1,175 lb) of bombs

== See also ==
Related development

- Caproni Ca.1 (1914)
- Caproni Ca.2
- Caproni Ca.3

Aircraft of comparable role, configuration, and era

- Handley Page Type O
- Sikorsky Ilya Muromets
- Vickers Vimy

Related lists

- List of bomber aircraft
- List of World War I Entente aircraft

== Bibliography ==
- Layman, Dick (June 1993). "Les Ca-5 de l'US Navy" [The Ca-5s of the US Navy]. Avions: Toute l'aéronautique et son histoire (in French) (4): 11–14. ISSN 1243-8650.
