= Bomber =

Heavy ground attack aircraft

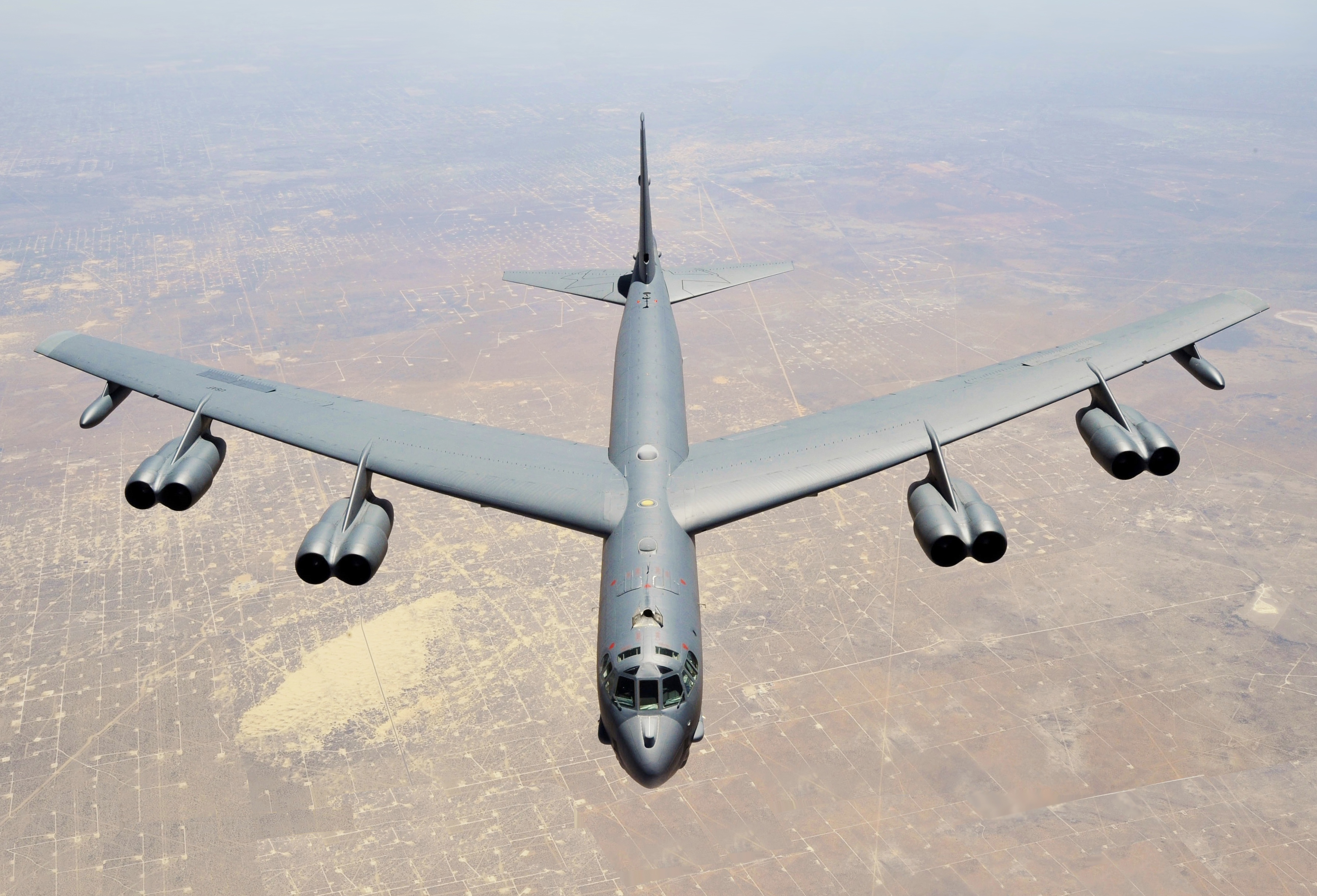
A U.S. Air Force B-52 Stratofortress flying over Texas.

A bomber is a military combat aircraft that utilizes air-to-ground weaponry to drop bombs, launch torpedoes, or deploy air-launched cruise missiles.

There are two major classifications of bomber: strategic and tactical. Strategic bombing is done by heavy bombers primarily designed for long-range bombing missions against strategic targets to diminish the enemy's ability to wage war by limiting access to resources through crippling infrastructure, reducing industrial output, or inflicting massive civilian casualties to an extent deemed to force surrender. Tactical bombing is aimed at countering enemy military activity and in supporting offensive operations, and is typically assigned to smaller aircraft operating at shorter ranges, typically near the troops on the ground or against enemy shipping.

Bombs were first dropped from an aircraft during the Italo-Turkish War, with the first major deployments coming in the First World War and Second World War by all major airforces, damaging cities, towns, and rural areas. The first bomber planes in history were the Italian Caproni Ca 30 and British Bristol T.B.8, both of 1913. Some bombers were decorated with nose art or victory markings.

During WWII with engine power as a major limitation, combined with the desire for accuracy and other operational factors, bomber designs tended to be tailored to specific roles. Early in the Cold War however, bombers were the only means of carrying nuclear weapons to enemy targets, and held the role of deterrence.

With the advent of guided air-to-air missiles, bombers needed to avoid interception. High-speed and high-altitude flying became a means of evading detection and attack. With the advent of ICBMs the role of the bomber was brought to a more tactical focus in close air support roles, and a focus on stealth technology for strategic bombers.

== Classification ==
=== Strategic ===
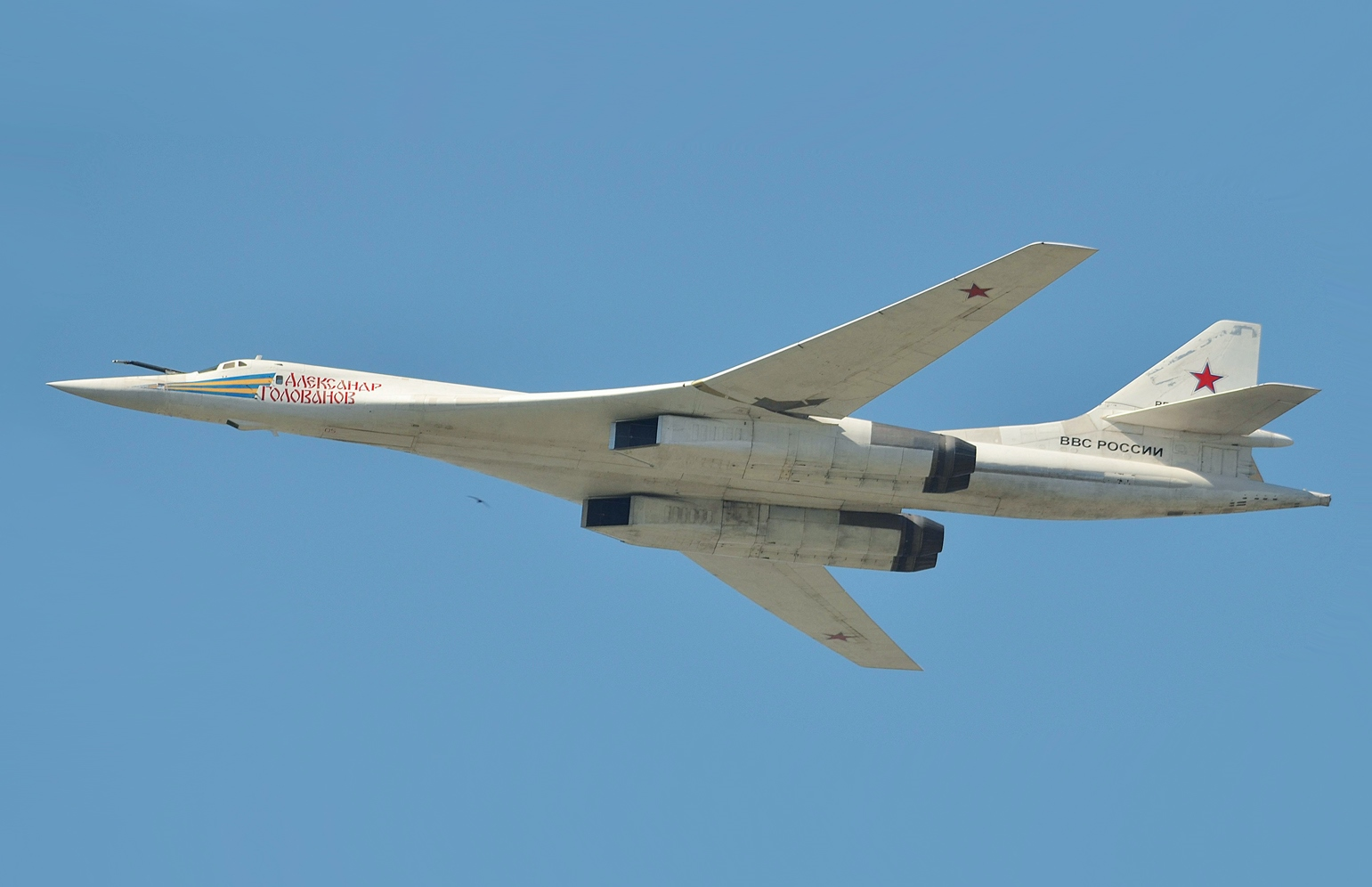
A Russian Air Force Tupolev Tu-160 "Black Jack" strategic bomber

Strategic bombing is done by heavy bombers primarily designed for long-range bombing missions against strategic targets such as supply bases, bridges, factories, shipyards, and cities themselves, to diminish the enemy's ability to wage war by limiting access to resources through crippling infrastructure or reducing industrial output. Current examples include the strategic nuclear-armed bombers: B-2 Spirit, B-52 Stratofortress, Tupolev Tu-95 'Bear', Tupolev Tu-22M 'Backfire' and Tupolev Tu-160 "Blackjack"; historically notable examples are the: Gotha G.IV, Avro Lancaster, Heinkel He 111, Junkers Ju 88, Boeing B-17 Flying Fortress, Consolidated B-24 Liberator, Boeing B-29 Superfortress, and Tupolev Tu-16 'Badger'.

=== Tactical ===
Tactical bombing, aimed at countering enemy military activity and in supporting offensive operations, is typically assigned to smaller aircraft operating at shorter ranges, typically near the troops on the ground or against enemy shipping. This role is filled by tactical bomber class, which crosses and blurs with various other aircraft categories: light bombers, medium bombers, dive bombers, interdictors, fighter-bombers, attack aircraft, multirole combat aircraft, and others.

- Current examples: Xian JH-7, Dassault Mirage 2000D, and the Panavia Tornado IDS
- Historical examples: Ilyushin Il-2 Shturmovik, Junkers Ju 87 Stuka, Republic P-47 Thunderbolt, Hawker Typhoon and Mikoyan MiG-27.

== History ==
The first use of an air-dropped bomb (actually four hand grenades specially manufactured by the Italian naval arsenal) was carried out by Italian Second Lieutenant Giulio Gavotti on 1 November 1911 during the Italo-Turkish War in Libya – although his plane was not designed for the task of bombing, and his improvised attacks on Ottoman positions had little impact. These picric acid-filled steel spheres were nicknamed "ballerinas" from the fluttering fabric ribbons attached. Turks carried out the first anti-airplane operation in history during the Italo-Turkish War. Although lacking anti-aircraft weapons, they were the first to shoot down an airplane by rifle fire. The first aircraft to crash in a war was the one of Lieutenant Piero Manzini, shot down on 25 August 1912.

=== Early bombers ===
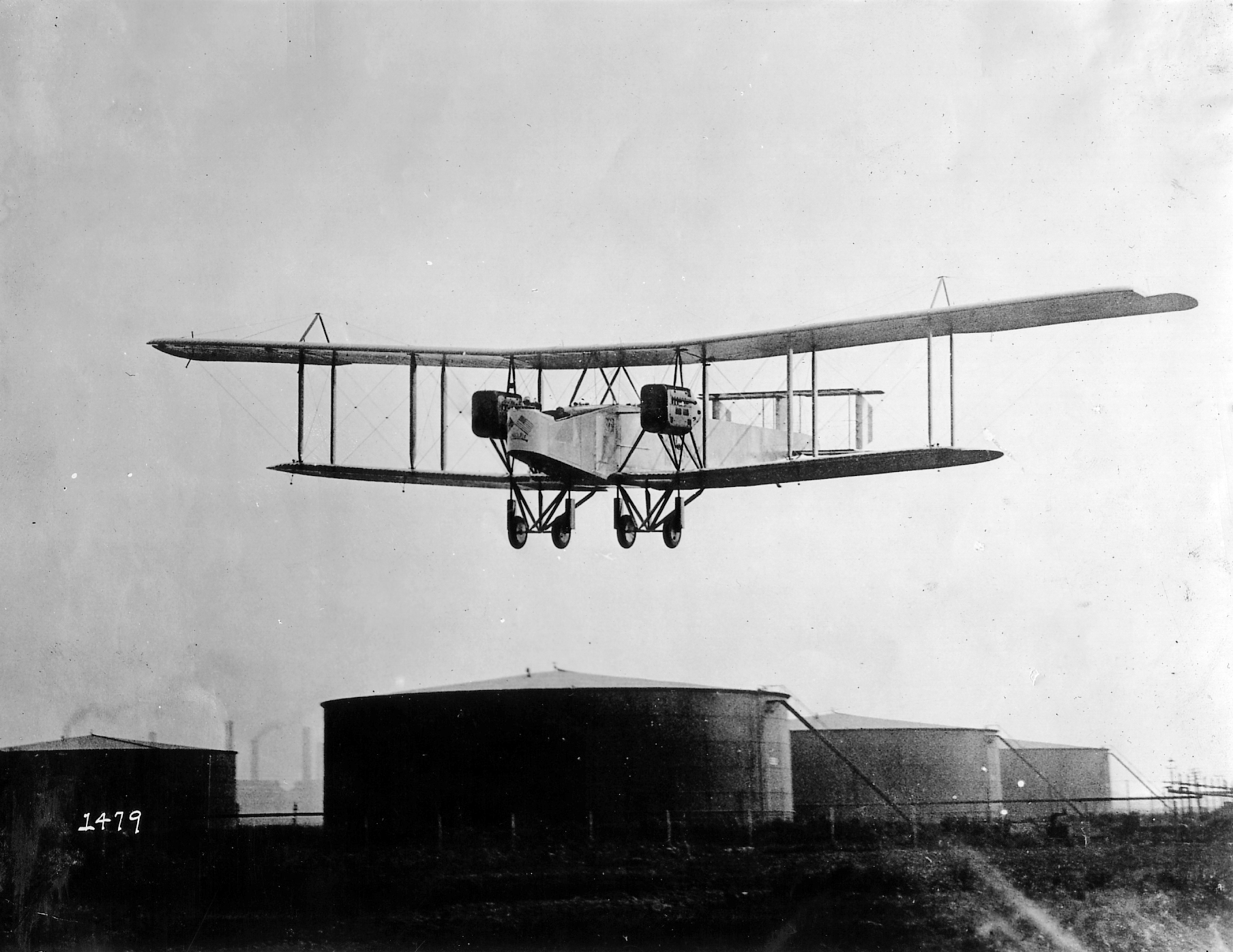
British Handley Page Type O, 1918

On 16 October 1912, Bulgarian observer Prodan Tarakchiev dropped two of those bombs on the Turkish railway station of Karağaç (near the besieged Edirne) from an Albatros F.2 aircraft piloted by Radul Milkov, during the First Balkan War. This is deemed to be the first use of an aircraft as a bomber.

The first heavier-than-air aircraft purposely designed for bombing were the Italian Caproni Ca 30 and British Bristol T.B.8, both of 1913. The Bristol T.B.8 was an early British single engined biplane built by the Bristol Aeroplane Company. They were fitted with a prismatic Bombsight in the front cockpit and a cylindrical bomb carrier in the lower forward fuselage capable of carrying twelve 10 pounds (4.5 kg) bombs, which could be dropped singly or as a salvo as required.

The aircraft was purchased for use both by the Royal Naval Air Service and the Royal Flying Corps (RFC), and three T.B.8s, that were being displayed in Paris during December 1913 fitted with bombing equipment, were sent to France following the outbreak of war. Under the command of Charles Rumney Samson, a bombing attack on German gun batteries at Middelkerke, Belgium was executed on 25 November 1914.

The dirigible, or airship, was developed in the early 20th century. Early airships were prone to disaster, but slowly the airship became more dependable, with a more rigid structure and stronger skin. Prior to the outbreak of war, Zeppelins, a larger and more streamlined form of airship designed by German Count Ferdinand von Zeppelin, were outfitted to carry bombs to attack targets at long range. These were the first long range, strategic bombers. Although the German air arm was strong, with a total of 123 airships by the end of the war, they were vulnerable to attack and engine failure, as well as navigational issues. German airships inflicted little damage on all 51 raids, with 557 Britons killed and 1,358 injured. The German Navy lost 53 of its 73 airships, and the German Army lost 26 of its 50 ships.

The Caproni Ca 30 was built by Gianni Caproni in Italy. It was a twin-boom biplane with three 67 kW (90 hp) Gnome rotary engines and first flew in October 1914. Test flights revealed power to be insufficient and the engine layout unworkable, and Caproni soon adopted a more conventional approach installing three 81 kW (109 hp) Fiat A.10s. The improved design was bought by the Italian Army and it was delivered in quantity from August 1915.

While mainly used as a trainer, Avro 504s were also briefly used as bombers at the start of the First World War by the Royal Naval Air Service (RNAS) when they were used for raids on the German airship sheds.

=== Strategic bombing ===
Bombing raids and interdiction operations were mainly carried out by French and British forces during the War as the German air arm was forced to concentrate its resources on a defensive strategy. Notably, bombing campaigns formed a part of the British offensive at the Battle of Neuve Chapelle in 1915, with Royal Flying Corps squadrons attacking German railway stations in an attempt to hinder the logistical supply of the German army. The early, improvised attempts at bombing that characterized the early part of the war slowly gave way to a more organized and systematic approach to strategic and tactical bombing, pioneered by various air power strategists of the Entente, especially Major Hugh Trenchard; he was the first to advocate that there should be "... sustained [strategic bombing] attacks with a view to interrupting the enemy's railway communications ... in conjunction with the main operations of the Allied Armies."

When the war started, bombing was very crude (hand-held bombs were thrown over the side) yet by the end of the war long-range bombers equipped with complex mechanical bombing computers were being built, designed to carry large loads to destroy enemy industrial targets. The most important bombers used in World War I were the French Breguet 14, British de Havilland DH-4, German Albatros C.III and Russian Sikorsky Ilya Muromets. The Russian Sikorsky Ilya Muromets, was the first four-engine bomber to equip a dedicated strategic bombing unit during World War I. This heavy bomber was unrivaled in the early stages of the war, as the Central Powers had no comparable aircraft until much later.

Long range bombing raids were carried out at night by multi-engine biplanes such as the Gotha G.IV (whose name was synonymous with all multi-engine German bombers) and later the Handley Page Type O; the majority of bombing was done by single-engined biplanes with one or two crew members flying short distances to attack enemy lines and immediate hinterland. As the effectiveness of a bomber was dependent on the weight and accuracy of its bomb load, ever larger bombers were developed starting in World War I, while considerable money was spent developing suitable bombsights.

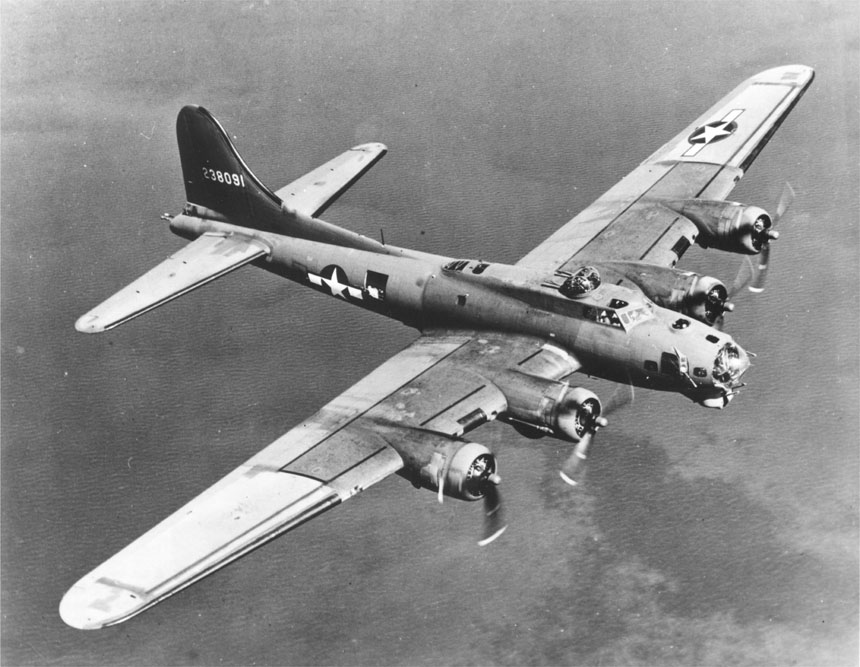
A USAAF B-17 Flying Fortress heavy bomber from World War II

=== World War II ===
With engine power as a major limitation, combined with the desire for accuracy and other operational factors, bomber designs tended to be tailored to specific roles. By the start of the war this included:

- dive bomber – specially strengthened for vertical diving attacks for greater accuracy
- light bomber, medium bomber and heavy bomber – subjective definitions based on size and/or payload capacity
- torpedo bomber – specialized aircraft armed with torpedoes
- ground attack aircraft – aircraft used against targets on a battlefield such as troop or tank concentrations
- night bomber – specially equipped to operate at night when opposing defences are limited
- maritime patrol – long range bombers that were used against enemy shipping, particularly submarines
- fighter-bomber – a modified fighter aircraft used as a light bomber

Bombers of this era were not intended to attack other aircraft although most were fitted with defensive weapons. World War II saw the beginning of the widespread use of high speed bombers which began to minimize defensive weaponry in order to attain higher speed. Some smaller designs were used as the basis for night fighters. A number of fighters, such as the Hawker Hurricane were used as ground attack aircraft, replacing earlier conventional light bombers that proved unable to defend themselves while carrying a useful bomb load.

=== Cold War ===
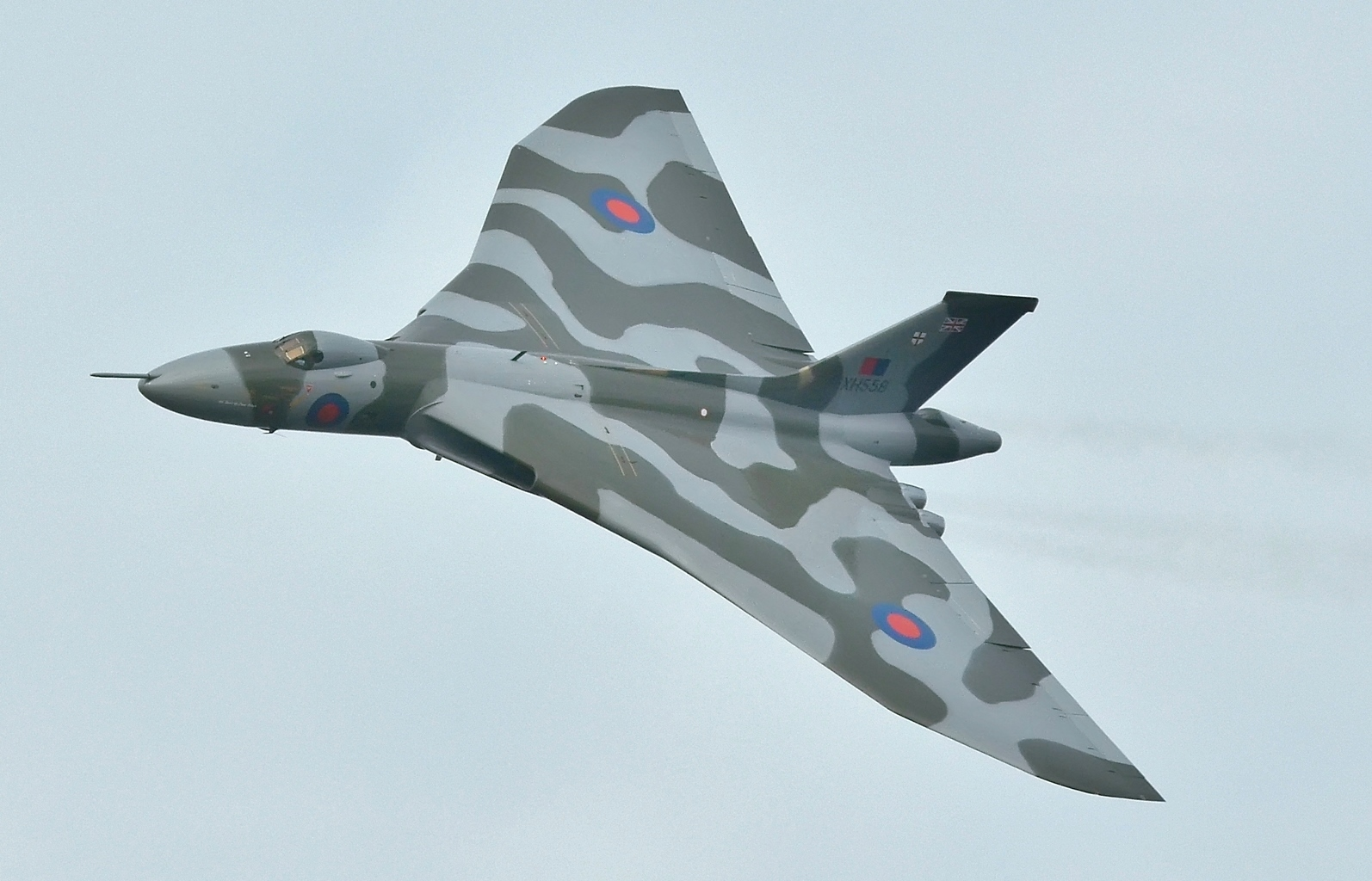
An RAF Avro Vulcan

At the start of the Cold War, bombers were the only means of carrying nuclear weapons to enemy targets, and had the role of deterrence. With the advent of guided air-to-air missiles, bombers needed to avoid interception. High-speed and high-altitude flying became a means of evading detection and attack. Designs such as the English Electric Canberra could fly faster or higher than contemporary fighters. When surface-to-air missiles became capable of hitting high-flying bombers, bombers were flown at low altitudes to evade radar detection and interception.

Once "stand off" nuclear weapon designs were developed, bombers did not need to pass over the target to make an attack; they could fire and turn away to escape the blast. Nuclear strike aircraft were generally finished in bare metal or anti-flash white to minimize absorption of thermal radiation from the flash of a nuclear explosion. The need to drop conventional bombs remained in conflicts with non-nuclear powers, such as the Vietnam War or Malayan Emergency.

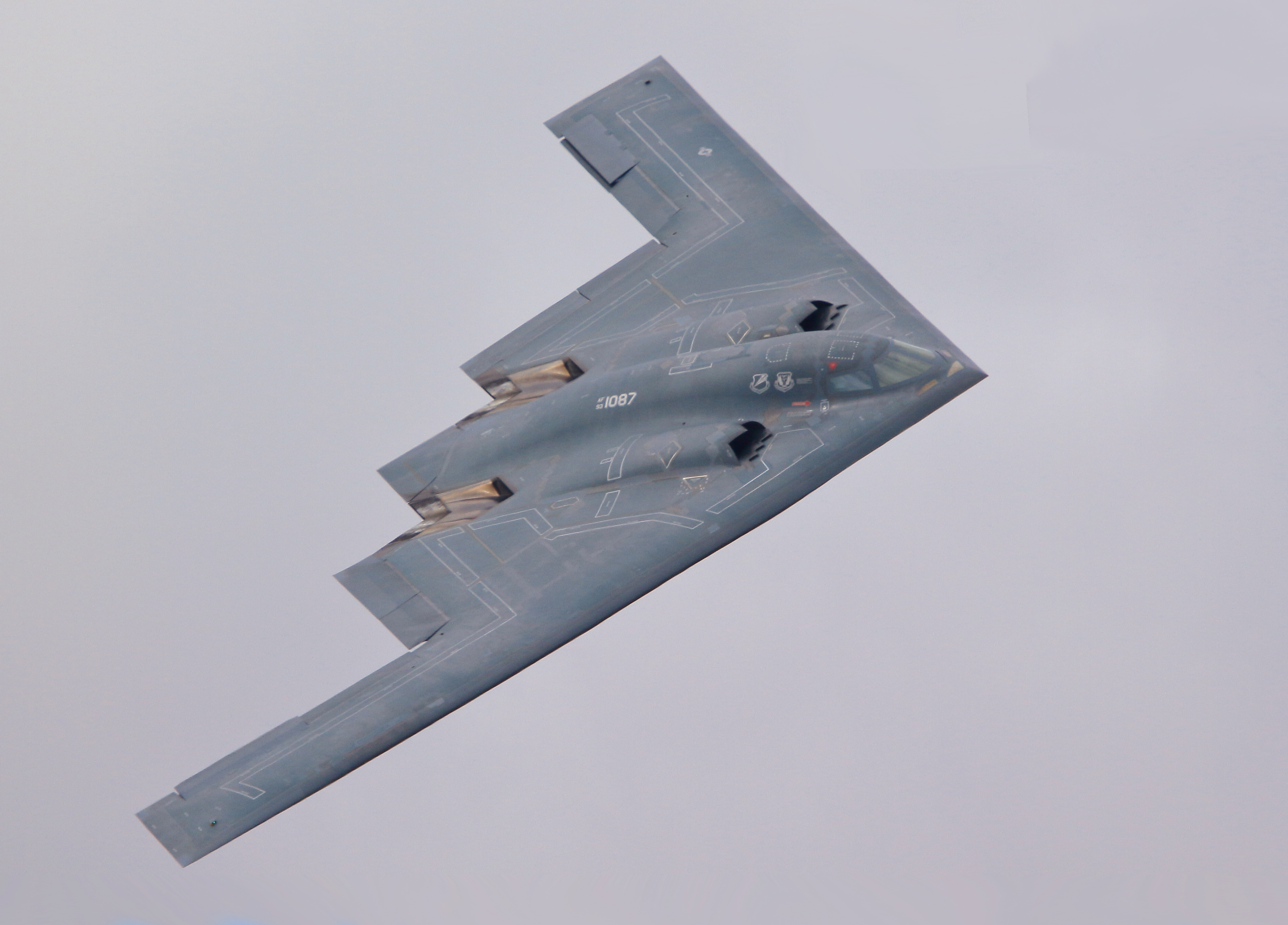
The U.S Air Force B-2 Spirit stealth bomber

The development of large strategic bombers stagnated in the later part of the Cold War because of spiraling costs and the development of the Intercontinental ballistic missile (ICBM) – which was felt to have similar deterrent value while being impossible to intercept. Because of this, the United States Air Force XB-70 Valkyrie program was cancelled in the early 1960s; the later B-1B Lancer and B-2 Spirit aircraft entered service only after protracted political and development problems. Their high cost meant that few were built and the 1950s-designed B-52s are projected to remain in use until the 2040s. Similarly, the Soviet Union used the intermediate-range Tu-22M 'Backfire' in the 1970s, but their Mach 3 bomber project stalled. The Mach 2 Tu-160 'Blackjack' was built only in tiny numbers, leaving the 1950s Tupolev Tu-16 and Tu-95 'Bear' heavy bombers to continue being used into the 21st century.

The British strategic bombing force largely came to an end when the V bomber force was phased out; the last of which left service in 1983. The French Mirage IV bomber version was retired in 1996, although the Mirage 2000N and the Rafale have taken on this role. The only other nation that fields strategic bombing forces is China, which has a number of Xian H-6s.

=== Modern era ===
Currently, only the United States Air Force, the Russian Aerospace Forces' Long-Range Aviation command, and China's People's Liberation Army Air Force operate strategic heavy bombers. Other air forces have transitioned away from dedicated bombers in favor of multirole combat aircraft.

At present, these air forces are each developing stealth replacements for their legacy bomber fleets, the USAF with the Northrop Grumman B-21, the Russian Aerospace Forces with the PAK DA, and the PLAAF with the Xian H-20. As of 2021, the B-21 is expected to enter service by 2026–2027. The B-21 would be capable of loitering near target areas for extended periods of time.

== Other uses ==
Occasionally, military aircraft have been used to bomb ice jams with limited success as part of an effort to clear them. In 2018, the Swedish Air Force dropped bombs on a forest fire, snuffing out flames with the aid of the blast waves. The fires had been raging in an area contaminated with unexploded ordnance, rendering them difficult to extinguish for firefighters.

== See also ==
- Aerial bombing of cities
- Air interdiction
- Assembly ship
- Carpet bombing
- Fighter aircraft
- List of bomber aircraft
- Offensive counter air
