= Caproni Ca.2 =

Ca.2 (1915)
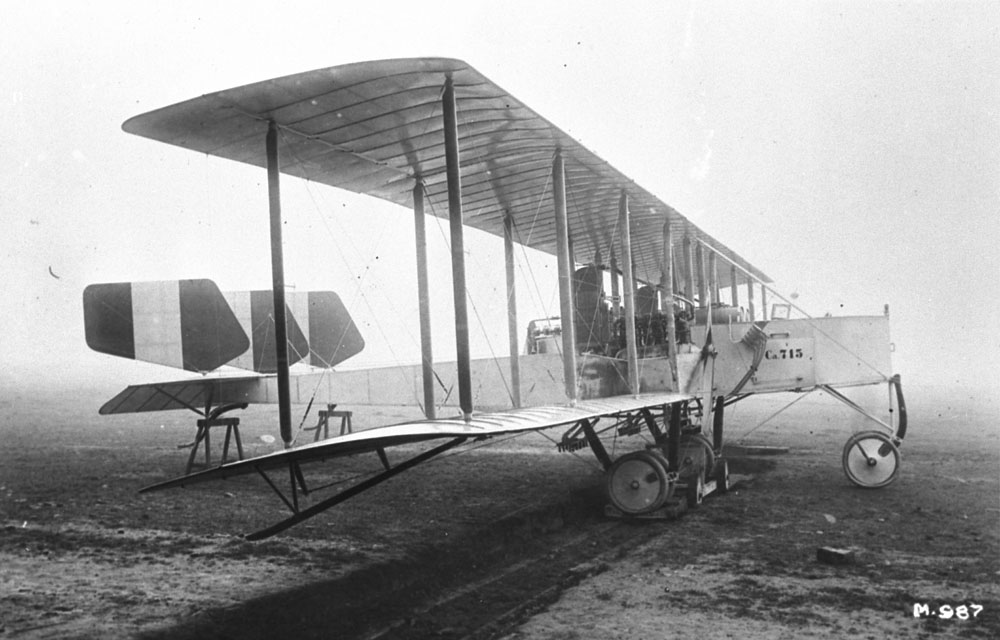

General information
- Type: Heavy day bomber
- National origin: Italy
- Manufacturer: Caproni
- Number built: 9

History
- First flight: Late 1915
- Developed from: Caproni Ca.1

The Caproni Ca.2 was an Italian heavy bomber of the World War I era.

== Development ==
The Ca.2 was a minor development of the Caproni Ca.1 twin-boom bomber of 1914. It had become evident early in the Ca.1's service life that the design could benefit from more power. Caproni therefore replaced the central, pusher engine of the aircraft with a more powerful one. Caproni referred to this as the Caproni 350 hp at the time, and the Italian Army dubbed it the Ca.2. No separate number seems to have been allocated to it in Caproni's postwar redesignation scheme.

Only nine aircraft were built, supplied to the Italian Army alongside deliveries of Ca.1s between August 1915 and December 1916.

The benefits of increased power encouraged Caproni to continue in this direction, leading to the definitive Caproni Ca.3.

== Description ==
The Caproni Ca.2 was a trimotor biplane with an engine mounted on the rear of the central nacelle, and two others mounted on the front of twin booms, which held the tail. It was largely of wooden construction, covered with fabric. The crew of four were in an open central nacelle (front gunner, two pilots and rear gunner-mechanic). The rear gunner manned upper machine guns, standing over the central engine in a protective "cage," just in front of its propeller. It was fitted with tricycle landing gear.

Armament consisted of two to four Revelli 6.5 mm or 7.7 mm machine guns, one on a front ring mount and one, two or sometimes even three on an upper ring mount. Bombs were suspended under the central nacelle.

== Operators ==
Kingdom of Italy

- Corpo Aeronautico Militare

== Specifications (Ca.2) ==
Data from

General characteristics

- Crew: four (pilot, co-pilot, front gunner, and rear gunner/mechanic)
- Length: 11.05 m (36 ft 3 in)
- Wingspan: 22.74 m (74 ft 7 in)
- Height: 3.7 m (12 ft 2 in)
- Wing area: 95.6 m^{2} (1,029 sq ft)
- Empty weight: 3,302 kg (7,280 lb)
- Max takeoff weight: 4,000 kg (8,818 lb)
- Powerplant: 2 × Fiat A.10 six-cylinder, water-cooled, in-line piston aero engine, 75 kW (101 hp) each
- Powerplant: 1 × Isotta-Fraschini V.4B six-cylinder, water-cooled, in-line piston aero engine, 112 kW (150 hp)

Performance

- Maximum speed: 133 km/h (83 mph, 72 kn)

Armament

- 2 × 6.5 mm FIAT-Revelli machine guns
- Bombs mounted under the hull

== See also ==
- Push-pull configuration

Related development

- Caproni Ca.1 (1914)
- Caproni Ca.3
- Caproni Ca.5

Related lists

- List of bomber aircraft
- List of World War I Entente aircraft
