= Caproni Ca.3 =

Italian heavy bomber of World War I and the postwar era

Ca.3
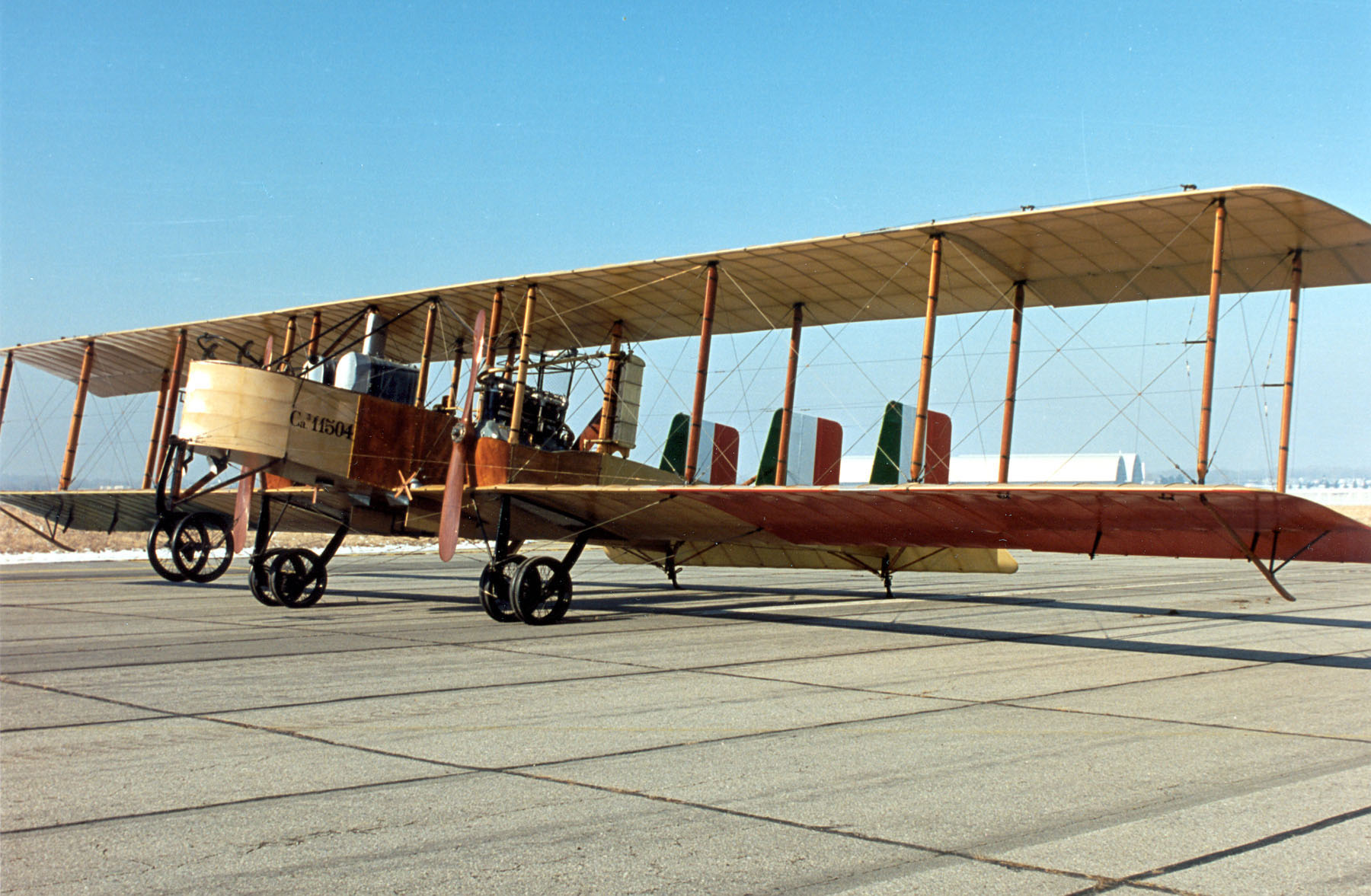
- Caproni Ca.36 at the National Museum of the United States Air Force

General information
- Type: Heavy bomber
- National origin: Italy
- Manufacturer: Caproni
- Primary users: Regia Aeronautica Corpo Aeronautico Militare

History
- First flight: 1916

The Caproni Ca.3 is an Italian heavy bomber of World War I and the postwar era. It was the most produced version of the series of aircraft that began with the 1914 Caproni Ca.1 and continued until the more powerful 1917 Caproni Ca.5 variant.

== Development ==
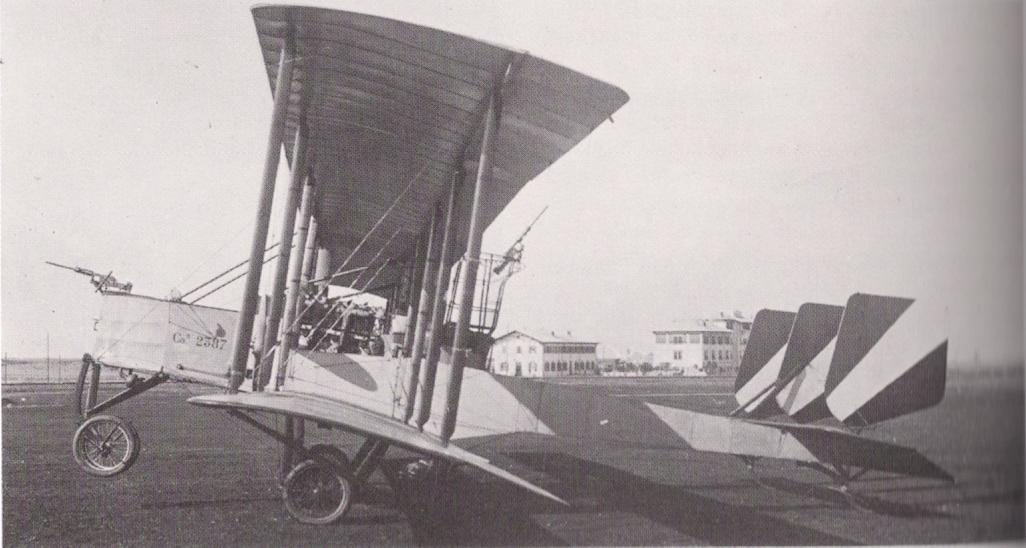
Caproni Ca.33, c. 1920s

The development of the Ca.1 to the Ca.2 suggested the benefits of increasing amounts of power to the very sound airframe. The Ca.3 was a development of Ca.2, by replacing the two engines mounted on the booms with the same Isotta-Fraschini engine that had been used as the central, pusher engine on that design. The prototype flew in late 1916 and was soon put into production. Known by Caproni at the time as the Caproni 450 hp, the Italian Army designated it the Ca.3. In Caproni's postwar renaming, it became the Ca.33. Between 250 and 300 of these aircraft were built, supplying the Italian Army and Navy (the latter using the type as a torpedo bomber), and the French Army. Late in the war, Robert Esnault-Pelterie licence-built an additional 83 (some sources say only 19) aircraft in France.

Note: there is some variation in published sources over early Caproni names. The confusion stems, in part, from three schemes used to label the aircraft – Caproni's in-house designations of the time, those used by the Italian Army and names created after the war by Caproni for past designs.

== Design ==
The Ca.3 was a three-engined biplane of wooden construction, with a fabric-covered frame. The crew of four were placed in an open central nacelle (front gunner, two pilots and rear gunner-mechanic). The rear gunner manned upper machine guns, standing upon the central engine in a protective "cage" in front of a propeller. The fixed conventional undercarriage had double mainwheels under each engine and a tailskid under the extreme tail of each boom. A substantial double nosewheel prevented damaging and dangerous nose-overs.

Armament consisted of two to four Revelli 6.5 mm or 7.7 mm machine guns, one in a front ring mount and one, two or sometimes even three in an upper ring mount. Bombs were suspended under the hull.

== Operational history ==
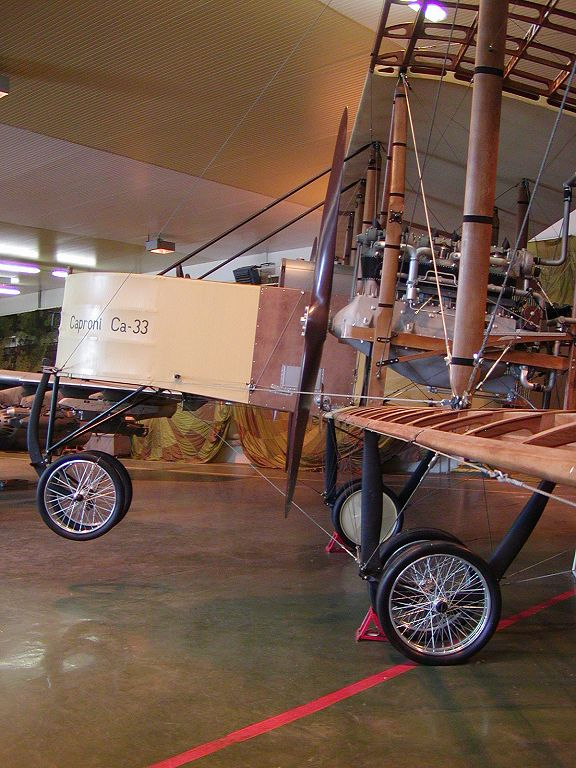
Nose of the Caproni Ca.33 at Vojenské Historické Múzeum, Piešťany, Slovakia, 2007

The Ca.1 entered service with the Italian Army in the middle of 1915 and first saw action on 20 August, attacking the Austrian air base at Aisovizza. Fifteen bomber squadrons (1°–15° Squadriglia) were eventually equipped with Ca.1, Ca.2 and Ca.3 bombers, mostly bombing targets in Austro-Hungary. The 12° Squadriglie operated in Libya. In 1918, the 3°, 14° and 15° Squadriglia operated in France.

Apart from the Italian Army, original and licence-built examples were used by France (original Capronis were used in French CAP escadres, licence-built examples in CEP escadres). They were also used by the American Expeditionary Force. There has been some confusion regarding the use of the Ca3 by the British Royal Naval Air Service. The RNAS received six of the larger triplane Ca4s and did not operate the Ca3. The British Ca4s were not used operationally and were returned to Italy after the war. Some of the Ca.36Ms supplied after the war were still in service long enough to see action in Benito Mussolini's first assaults on North Africa.

== Variants ==
All of the following names were applied after the war. At the time, all were known as the 300 hp by Caproni and the Ca.3 by the Army.

- Ca.34 and Ca.35 with a modified central nacelle to seat the two pilots in tandem and therefore improve aerodynamics. No production.
- Ca.36 with removable outer wing panels for ease of storage.
  - Ca.36M or Ca.36 mod (for modificato – "modified") – a lightened and simplified variant put into production after the war. 153 were delivered between 1923 and 1927, 144 of them to the new Regia Aeronautica.
  - Ca.36S – air ambulance version (small number converted from Ca.36Ms)
- Ca.39 – seaplane version. Prototype CA 211.
- Ca.56a – airliners created by remanufacturing war-surplus Ca.3s.

== Operators ==
Argentina

- Argentine Air Force

Kingdom of Italy

- Corpo Aeronautico Militare
- Regia Aeronautica

France

- French Air Force

USA

- American Expeditionary Force

== Surviving aircraft and replicas ==
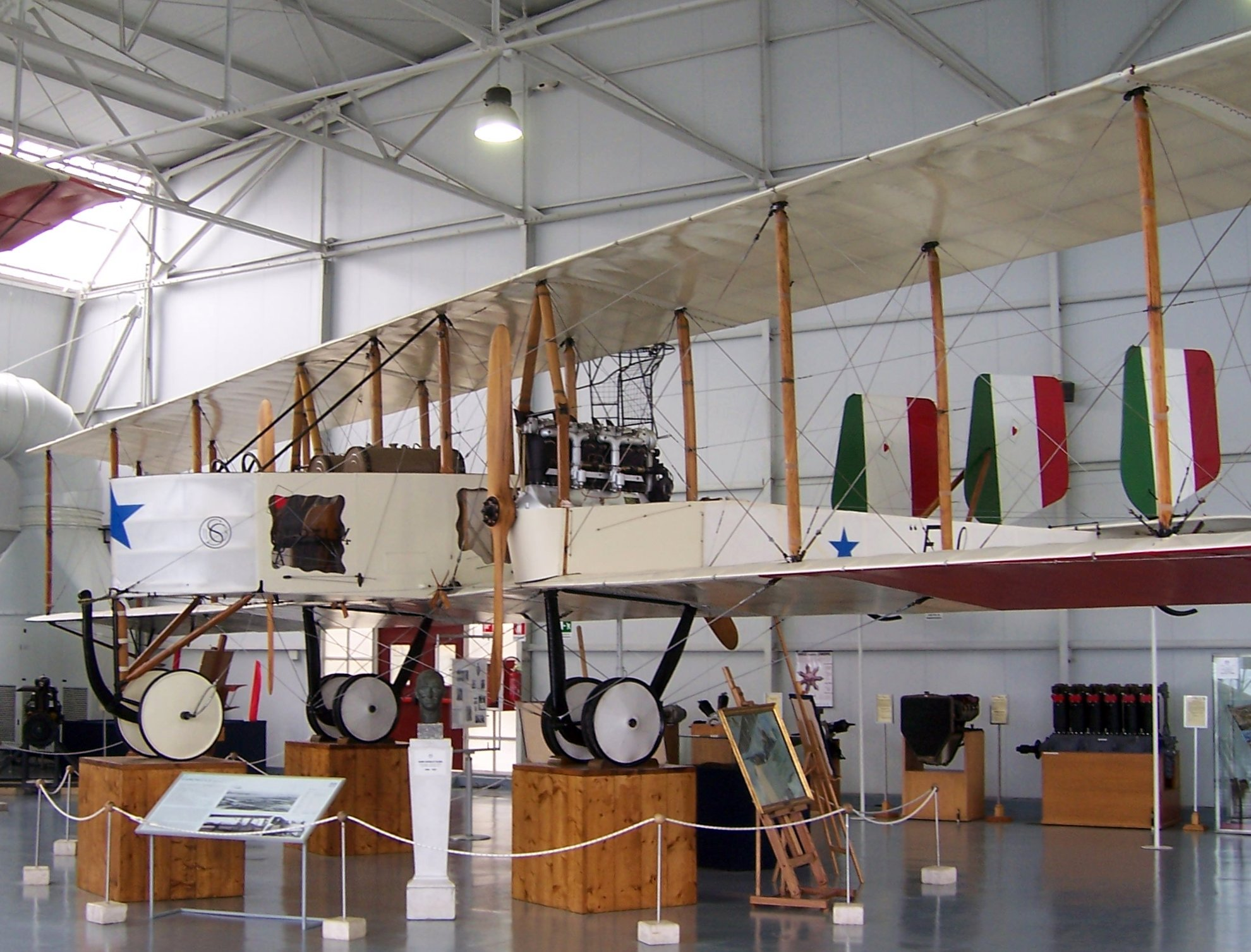
Ca.36 at the Italian Air Force Museum

=== Italy ===
- Unknown ID – Ca.36 on static display at the Italian Air Force Museum in Bracciano, Lazio.
- Replica – Ca.33Z airworthy with the Jonathan Collection in Nervesa della Battaglia, Treviso.

=== Slovakia ===
- Reproduction – Ca.33 on static display since June 2012 in the departure hall of M. R. Štefánik Airport in Bratislava, on loan from the Vojenské historické muzeum in Piešťany, Trnava.

=== United States ===
- Unknown ID – Ca.36 on static display at the National Museum of the United States Air Force in Dayton, Ohio.

== Specifications (Ca.36) ==
Data from

General characteristics

- Crew: four (pilot, co-pilot, front gunner, and rear gunner/mechanic)
- Length: 11.05 m (36 ft 3 in)
- Wingspan: 22.74 m (74 ft 7 in)
- Height: 3.7 m (12 ft 2 in)
- Wing area: 95.6 m^{2} (1,029 sq ft)
- Empty weight: 2,300 kg (5,071 lb)
- Max takeoff weight: 3,800 kg (8,378 lb)
- Powerplant: 3 × Isotta-Fraschini V.4B 6-cyl. water-cooled in-line piston engines, 112 kW (150 hp) each

Performance

- Maximum speed: 137 km/h (85 mph, 74 kn)
- Range: 600 km (370 mi, 320 nmi)
- Service ceiling: 4,800 m (15,700 ft)
- Rate of climb: 2 m/s (390 ft/min)

Armament
2 × 6.5 mm or 7.7 mm FIAT-Revelli machine guns

- 800 kg (1,764 lb) of bombs

== See also ==
- Push-pull configuration

Related development

- Caproni Ca.1 (1914)
- Caproni Ca.2
- Caproni Ca.5

Related lists

- List of bomber aircraft
- List of World War I Entente aircraft
