= Station hack =

A station hack (British English) or squadron hack (American English), is a utility aircraft assigned to an air station or squadron (that normally flies another type of aircraft in its role), and utilised for run-of-the-mill activities, including delivering to, or collecting from, other airfields personnel, spare parts, equipment, or documents; activities that would not be considered worthy of the tactical, strategic, or larger transport aeroplanes that might be operated from the same air station. Often these would be "war weary" or otherwise obsolete aircraft no longer suitable for combat operations.

The term is derived from the equestrian term for a horse used by competitive riders for everyday, run-of-the-mill riding, as opposed to those used for competitive riding.

== See also ==
- Assembly ship
