= Fokker K.I =

Fokker K.I/M.9
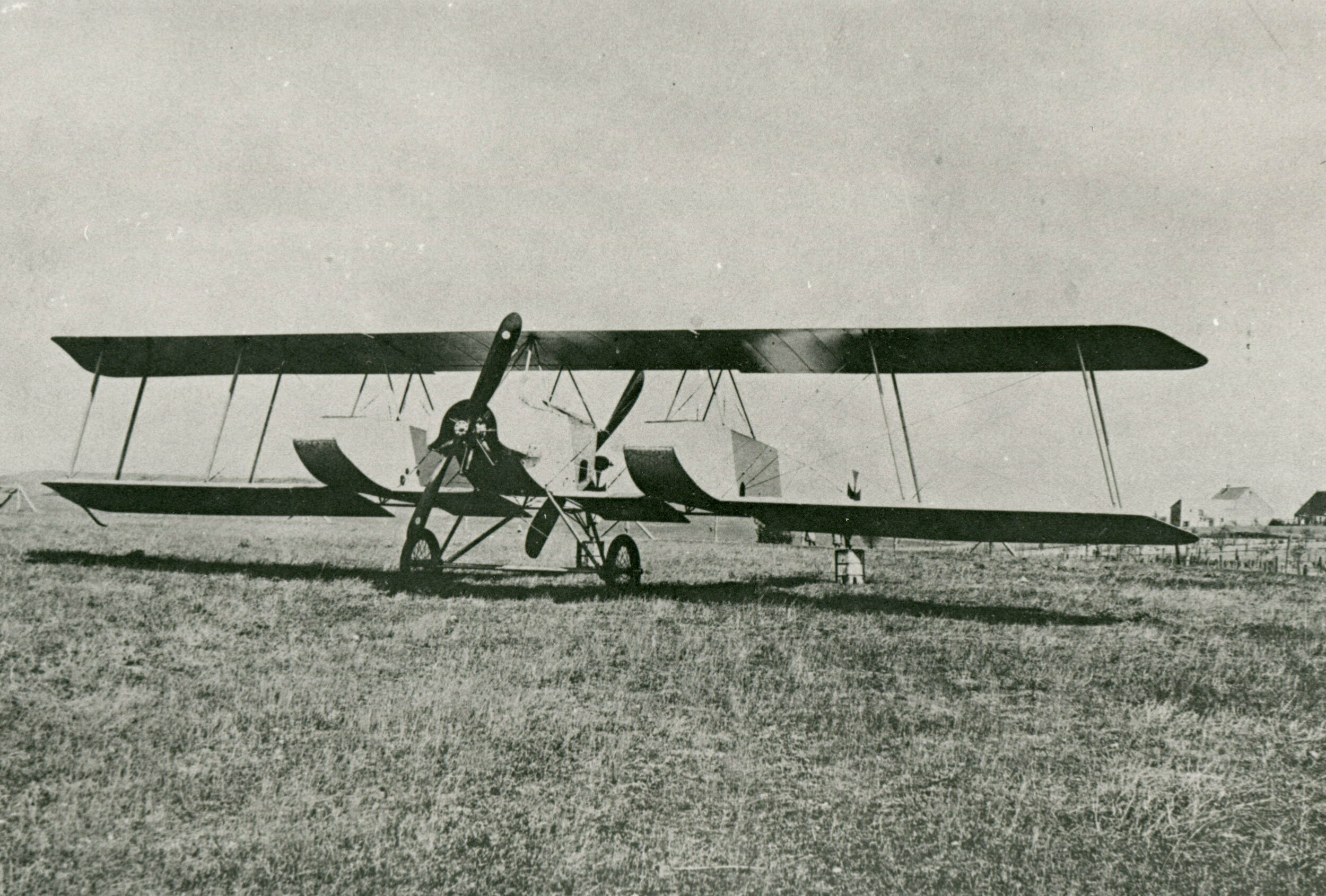

General information
- Type: Experimental aircraft
- National origin: Germany
- Manufacturer: Fokker
- Designer: Anthony Fokker
- Number built: 1

History
- First flight: 1915

The Fokker K.I (Kampfflugzeug - "Battleplane"), company designation M.9, was a German experimental biplane built during World War I by the Fokker-Flugzeugwerke (Fokker Aircraft Company). It was intended to meet a need by the Fliegertruppen des deutschen Kaiserreiches (Imperial German Air Service) for an aircraft that could defend itself against Entente fighters armed with machine guns. Fokker had had only limited resources available for the project and Anthony Fokker, the company's owner, could not devote a lot of time or material to the K.I, given the demands on his time and the company's resources. The limited flight testing conducted by Fokker revealed multiple problems with the aircraft's center of gravity and structural strength. Resolving these issues was beyond Fokker's abilities at that time and he ordered the K.I scrapped.

== Background and development ==
The company had been forced to focus on expanding its facilities and workforce to satisfy the plethora of orders that it had received after the beginning of the war in 1914 and the K.I was Anthony Fokker's first new design since the war began. The Imperial German Air Service had expressed concerns about the vulnerability of its reconnaissance aircraft to Entente fighters and Fokker decided to see what might be possible without devoting a lot of time to the project. As interrupter gear that allowed guns to safely fire through a spinning propeller was still under development, including by Fokker, this meant a design that maximized the field of fire of its gunner(s). Fokker devised an unusual three-seat design with a central nacelle with engines at each end in a push-pull configuration that was flanked on each side by booms with gunners positioned at their front.

First flown in 1915, the M.9 had two M.7 fuselages and tails, without engines, mounted on the lower wing. To this was added a central with two seven-cylinder, 80 hp Oberursel U.0 rotary engines, one at either end. The crew of three included a pilot in the nacelle, and one gunner positioned at the nose of each fuselage.

Mounting the two fuselages on the wings with no connection between them further aft turned out to be a mistake. Fokker was still using wing warping instead of ailerons for roll control, so when the wings were warped, the fuselages were deflected in opposite directions, either up or down depending upon which way the aircraft was rolled. This led to some very divergent flight characteristics. The test program was brief.

== Bibliography ==
- Gray, Peter & Thetford, Owen (1987) [1970]. German Aircraft of the First World War (2nd ed.). London: Putnam. ISBN 0-85177-809-7.
- Green, William & Swanborough, Gordon (2001) [1994]. The Complete Book of Fighters: An Illustrated Encyclopedia of Every Fighter Built and Flown (Revised and Updated ed.). London: Salamander Books. ISBN 1-84065-269-1.
- Herris, Jack (2020). Fokker Aircraft of WWI: Volume 1: Spinne–M.10 & Watercraft: A Centennial Perspective on Great War Airplanes. Great War Aviation Centennial Series. Vol. 51. n.p.: Aeronaut Books. ISBN 978-1-953201-05-8.
- Leaman, Paul (2001). Fokker Aircraft of World War One. Marlborough, UK: Crowood Press. ISBN 1-86126-353-8.
