= Siemens-Schuckert DDr.I =

DDr.1
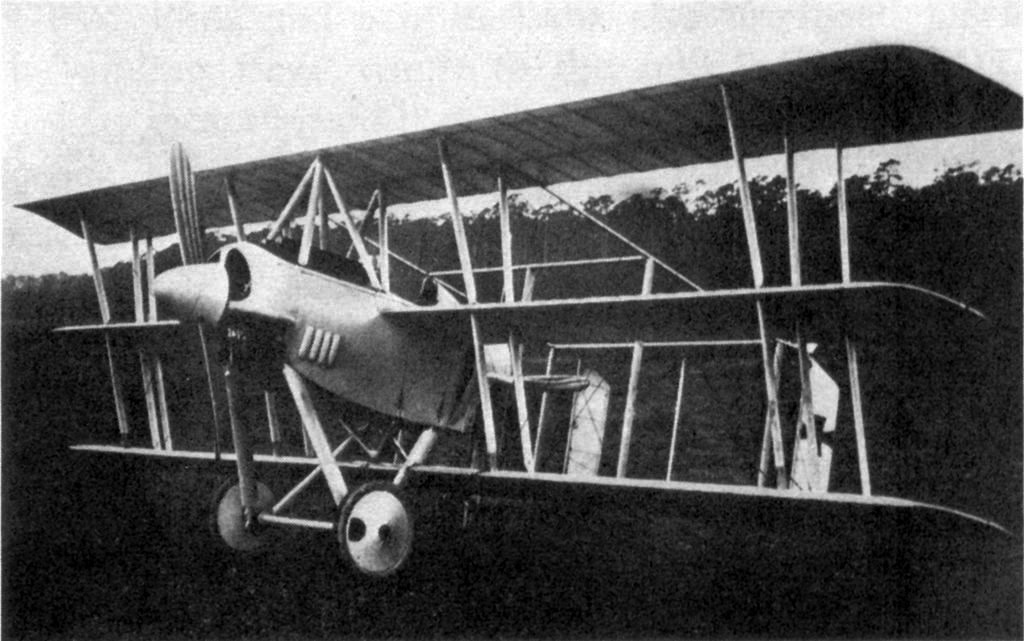

General information
- Type: Triplane fighter aircraft
- National origin: Germany
- Manufacturer: Siemens-Schuckert
- Number built: 1

History
- First flight: 9 November 1917

The Siemens-Schuckert DDr.I was a World War I German twin engine, push-pull configuration triplane fighter aircraft. Only one was built, crashing on its first flight.

== Design and development ==
The unusual DDr.I was one of the first aircraft to have two engines on the same centre line, one in tractor configuration and the other a pusher, an arrangement usually known as tandem push-pull. It was a triplane with constant chord, straight edged, square tipped wings of equal span and marked stagger. These were divided into two bays by pairs of near-parallel interplane struts. The upper wing was braced over the fuselage with a pair of N-form struts, leaning inward from the upper fuselage to common mountings on the wing centre line. The middle wing of the triplane was positioned at shoulder height on the fuselage and the lower wing passed unbraced below. There were short span ailerons on each wing.

The smoothly faired and contoured short fuselage of the DDr.I positioned the open pilot's cockpit between two 110 hp (82 kW) Siemens-Halske Sh.I nine cylinder rotary engines, one with a two blade tractor propeller and the other driving a four blade pusher turning just aft of the lower wing trailing edge. The empennage was mounted on four longitudinal, tubular outrigger beams, braced with vertical and transverse members. There were no fixed rear surfaces; the single piece, constant chord elevator reached between the two upper beams and a pair of similarly shaped rudder went from the upper to the lower beams, hinged further aft than the elevator but with their lower ends on a hinged frame that moved with it. The DDr.I had a fixed conventional undercarriage, with its mainwheels on a single axle mounted on wide spread V-struts attached to the lower fuselage at the lower corner points of each engine's firewall.

Engine control problems and a lack of stability experienced in the first flight, made on 9 November 1917, led to a crash; the aircraft was not rebuilt and plans for a more powerful version, the DDr.II, powered by two 160 hp (119 kW), Siemens-Halske Sh.III eleven cylinder rotary engines were abandoned.

== Specifications ==
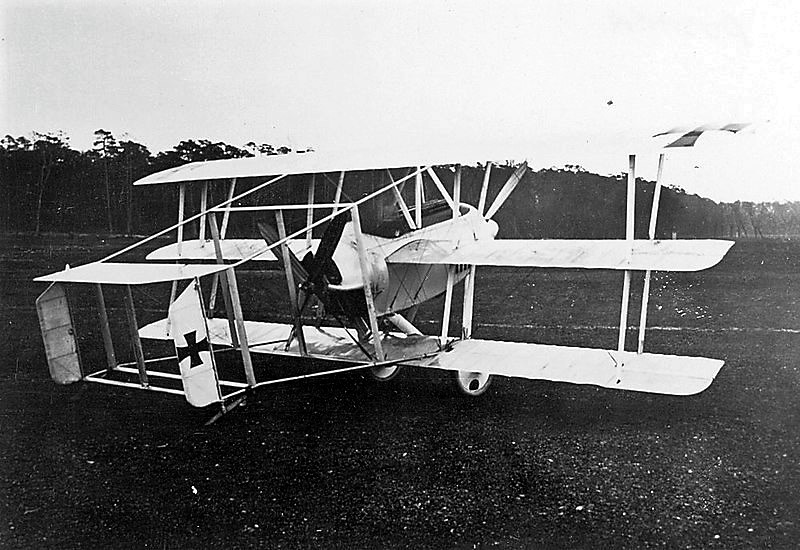

Data from German Aircraft of the First World War

General characteristics

- Crew: One
- Length: 5.8 m (19 ft 0 in)
- Wingspan: 10.9 m (35 ft 9 in)
- Wing area: 30 m^{2} (320 sq ft)
- Empty weight: 680 kg (1,499 lb)
- Gross weight: 910 kg (2,006 lb)
- Powerplant: 2 × Siemens-Halske Sh.1 9-cylinder rotary, 82 kW (110 hp) each
- Propellers: 2/4-bladed ; the tractor propeller had two blades and the pusher four.

Armament

- Guns: 2×7.9 mm (0.311 in) calibre LMG 08/15 (Spandau) synchronised machine guns
