= Combat box =

American WWII heavy bomber tactical formation

Combat box of a 12-plane B-17 squadron developed in October 1943. Three such boxes completed a 36-plane group box.: 1. Lead element; 2. High element; 3. Low element; 4. Low low element

The combat box was a tactical formation used by heavy (strategic) bombers of the U.S. Army Air Forces during World War II. The combat box was also referred to as a "staggered formation". Its defensive purpose was in massing the firepower of the bombers' guns, while offensively it concentrated the release of bombs on a target.

Initially formations were created in keeping with the pre-war Air Corps doctrine that massed bombers could attack and destroy targets in daylight without fighter escort, relying on interlocking fire from their defensive machine guns, almost exclusively the "light barrel" Browning AN/M2 .50 calibre (12.7 mm) gun. However the use of high altitudes by USAAF bombers resulted in factors that demanded a tighter bomb pattern and the combat box continued in use even after the advent of fighter escort largely mitigated the threat of fighter interception. It was especially used over Europe during and after the spring of 1944, with USAAF fighters flying far ahead of the combat boxes in air supremacy mode instead against the Luftwaffe's fighters.

Creation of the concept is credited to Colonel Curtis E. LeMay, commander of the 305th Bombardment Group in England. However the Eighth Air Force had been experimenting with different tactical formations since its first bombing mission on 17 August 1942, several of which were also known as "boxes". LeMay's group did create the "javelin down" combat box in December 1942, and that formation became the basis for the numerous variations of combat boxes that followed.

The practice of referring to a concentrated formation as a "box" was the result of diagramming formations in plan, profile and front elevation views, positioning each individual bomber in an invisible boxlike area.

== Evolution of Eighth Air Force formations ==
=== 1942 experiments ===
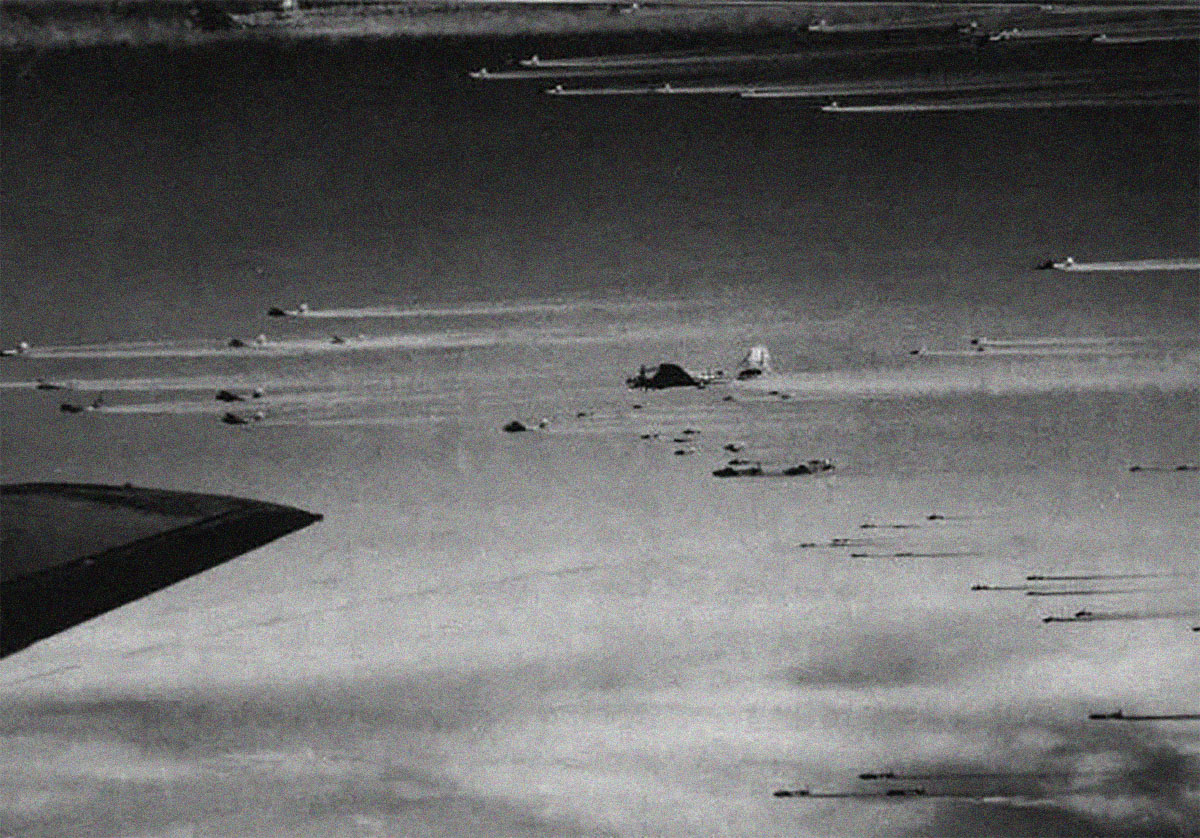
Combat boxes of 3rd Bomb Division B-17s

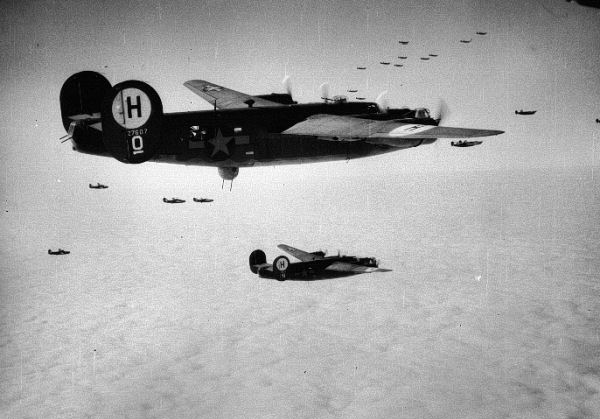
B-24s of the 446th Bomb Group fly in combat box formation

The first ten missions of the Eighth Air Force from England in August 1942 were shallow penetrations of France strongly supported by Royal Air Force Spitfire fighter escorts. B-17 Flying Fortresses flew in six-plane squadrons with two to four miles (3 to 6 km) between squadrons, to avoid mid-air collisions between the inexperienced crews. Although unable to support each other, the six-plane squadrons had the virtues of simplicity and ease of control. The bombers within a squadron were stacked at three altitudes with approximately 150 ft (46 m) between the highest and lowest, and except for the lead pair, were not in mutually supporting elements. As missions grew larger in size, deeper in penetration, and faced increasingly effective defenders, the AAF recognized that more compact formations were needed and returned to the three-aircraft vee formation that had been standard before the war. Squadrons consisted of three such vees, all flying at the same altitude, with two such squadrons in a group formation, the second higher, trailing, and staggered to the right. The entire formation was 600 ft (180 m) high, 500 ft (150 m) deep, and nearly 2,500 ft (760 m) across. It proved cumbersome to maneuver, as did a 36-plane alternative, and left many bomber gunners with restricted fields of fire.

The original two heavy bomb groups of the Eighth Air Force transferred to North Africa and were replaced in October and November by four new groups of B-17s (the 306th, 91st, 303rd, and 305th groups), and two of B-24 Liberators (44th and 93rd BGs), each of which experimented with its own formations. Their early missions included numerous mechanical turnbacks ("aborts") which hampered development of effective schemes.

Between November 1942 and the end of the war various configurations of the combat box were adopted to meet changing conditions, particularly changed German tactics that stressed head-on attacks against the weak forward firepower of the bombers. The 305th BG innovated the 18-aircraft "javelin down" formation, which stacked planes within an element and squadrons within a group downwards in the direction of the sun. This aided gunners on the higher aircraft in seeing lower aircraft without being blinded by glare. In the front elevation the formation resembled a set of stairs, but in profile and plan resembled a spear point. Unlike earlier group formations in which the lead bomber had flown in the lowest position, it now was placed in the center of the formation vertically. The 305th successfully tested the formation on a December 6, 1942, mission to Lille, and it was immediately adopted by the other three B-17 groups.

The 305th soon developed a more compact staggered formation that stacked elements downward in one direction, but stacked squadrons upward in the opposite direction. A third element of three bombers was added to the 18-plane box, placed in the most exposed squadron for additional support. This resulted in a 21-plane wedge-shaped configuration that was adopted by all groups on January 13, 1943, and remained standard through September 1943.

In 1943, the use of assembly ships, modified older bombers with unique paint schemes, to organize combat boxes was devised. These planes continued to be used throughout the war, even with the invention of other technological advances.

=== Wing boxes ===
Although the combat box was initially designed around a group of airplanes, it was expanded to include a formation of three groups flying together as a "combat wing", all of which were based on the same triangular design of a leading bomber (or grouping of bombers) in the center, and two bombers (or groupings) immediately behind in a vee shape, with one at an altitude above and one below the center in close proximity for mutual defense. The new combat boxes continued to be used, but groups were placed in a horizontal column and stacked at increasing altitude to decrease their vulnerability to attack. This resulted in the rear formations lagging behind which impacted both defensive tactics and bombing performance.

The wing box, a 54-plane formation (basically three 18-plane boxes stacked in a similar fashion to the group box), evolved from a need to provide defensive fire against head-on attacks. The formations were stacked so that while squadrons were stacked away from the sun on missions, groups were stacked in the opposite direction, making for a more compact wing box. Because the Eighth AF had only four B-17 units until May 1943, composite groups were formed by combining squadrons from different groups, or a fourth group was added to the wing box to form a diamond-shaped box. The latter was flown in a trailing position behind the wing and proved susceptible to Luftwaffe tactics of attacking the extremities of formations. The wing box was often spread 3,000 ft (910 m) vertically, 7,000 ft (2,100 m) deep, and 2,000 ft (610 m) across and was difficult to maintain.

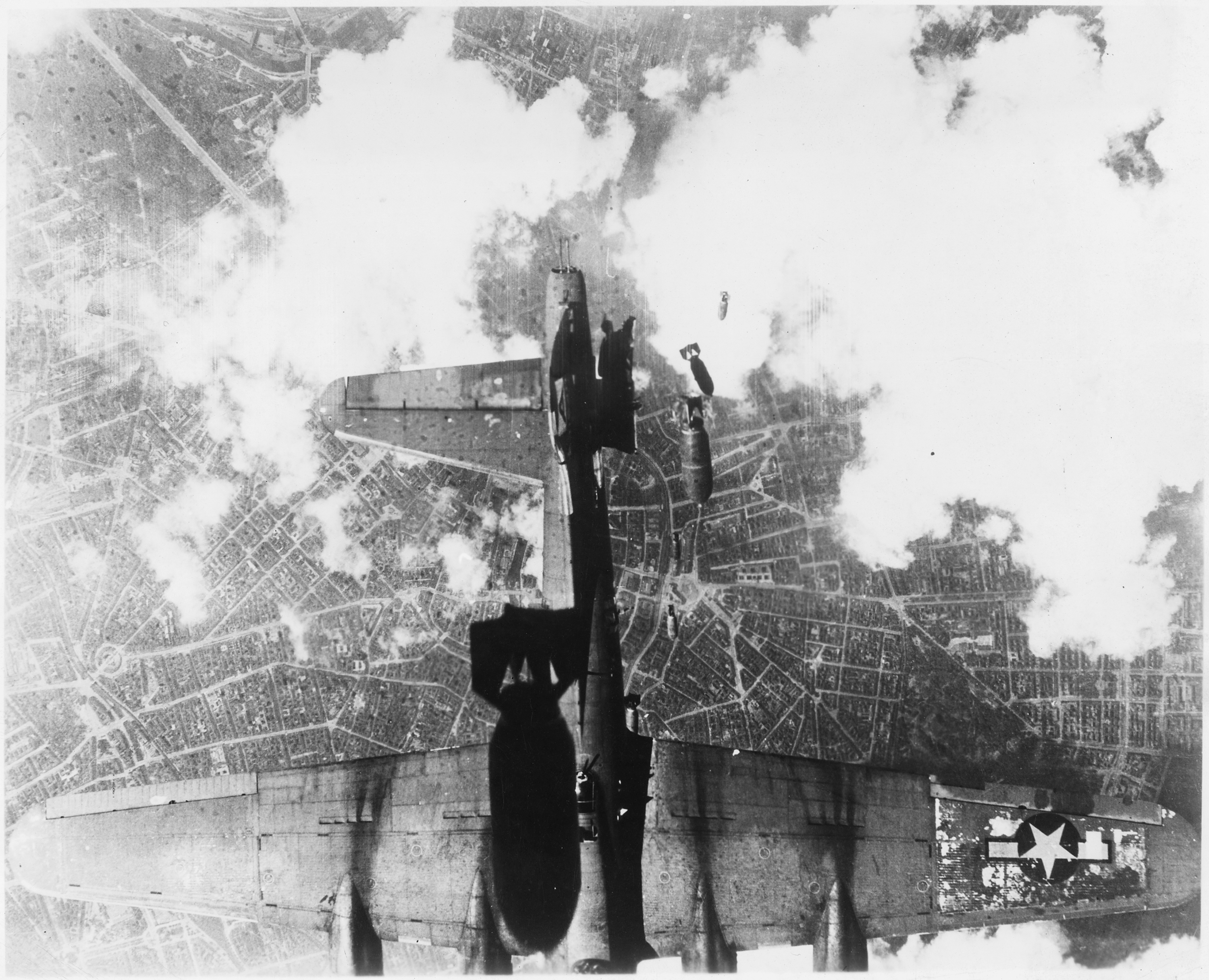
Berlin Germany 19 May 1944: B-17 Miss Donna Mae II (331st BS, 94th BG) was inadvertently bombed from above, breaking off the port horizontal stabilizer and causing a steep nose dive.

The most serious disadvantage of the wing box was that the lowermost and uppermost elements, trailing at the end of the formation, had the least mutual protection. An additional risk was that of an aircraft being struck by falling bombs if it strayed in the box (see image):

"Directly below us (on 19 May 1944 to Berlin in B-17G 42-102411) in the path of our falling bombs was a B-17 out of position. Later pictures show a B-17 having his left stablizer shorn off by a five hundred-pound bomb dropped from above. That plane went into a steep dive, out of control, and was lost. As mentioned before, the bombs had to fall about five hundred feet or more before the protective vane spun off to leave the bomb armed." —303rd BG pilot Richard Riley Johnson

In the summer of 1943 the Eighth expanded in size to 16 groups of B-17s and 4 of B-24s, and by the following June would grow to 39 groups. The table of organization and equipment for heavy bombardment groups was increased from 35 to 62 planes with a huge influx of new bombers beginning in the autumn of 1943, and the use of composite groups was discontinued as many groups flew two group boxes on a single mission.

The 54-plane wing combat box used by the Eighth's B-17s required both practice and discipline to maintain formation. Turbulence from leading bombers added to the difficulty of maintaining formation. The 54-plane box is capable of fielding upwards of 700 heavy calibre defensive machine guns in total to serve as a formidable defense against fighters, however. As flak became the greater threat in May 1944, the 36-plane box was resurrected in a much looser formation and became the standard through the remainder of the war except on days when significant fighter opposition was anticipated.

=== Group combat box revisions ===
In October 1943 the first radar-guided Pathfinder group began operations, bringing about a need for a compact 36-plane group formation to optimize bombing performance in adverse weather conditions. This was done initially by doubling the number of three-plane elements in a squadron formation from two to four, and placing all three planes within an element at the same altitude to avoid collisions. LeMay, who had been promoted to command of the 3rd Bomb Division, devised this diamond-shaped 12-plane combat box and preferred it over others, so that in August 1944 when he took command of Operation Matterhorn in India he adopted it as the basic formation for B-29 Superfortresses. A variation of the formation using four 9-plane squadrons in a diamond formation was developed to compress the bombing pattern further.

Wing boxes followed each other in trail, and the formation was easier for escorts to protect. However, the close stagger of the four-squadron 36-plane was difficult to maintain, and increased the likelihood of a bomber flying at the bottom of the box being struck by bombs dropped from a higher plane. In visual bombing situations the revised 36-plane box eliminated the lowest squadron to lessen the possibility. Although the 36- and 27-bomber group combat box became standard for most of 1944, a diamond-shaped formation of four 10-plane squadrons was developed for B-24s of both the Eighth and Fifteenth Air Force.

During the winter of 1944–45, minimizing losses to flak became a priority. The 27-plane box became standard for B-17s for all of 1945, spread more laterally to avoid catastrophic damage to the formation from a single shell burst. At the same time wingmen flew more forward on element leaders, creating a box that was stacked 750 ft (230 m) vertically, 650 ft (200 m) from front to back, and 1,170 ft (360 m) laterally. This final variation presented flak gunners with a small target, produced excellent bomb patterns, and was both easy to fly and control.

=== B-24 combat boxes ===
B-24s of the 2nd Air Division, more difficult than B-17s to fly in formation at high altitudes and with more restricted cockpit visibility, used a variation of the 27-plane group box. One element of each squadron (normally the uppermost in the middle/lead and high/right squadrons, and lowermost in the low/left squadron) was moved to the outside of the formation so that it was abreast of the trailing element. This produced a line formation that was 2,440 ft (740 m) wide and 700 ft (210 m) vertically, but only 320 ft (98 m) deep, reducing the time over target significantly. The 96th Combat Bomb Wing further refined the formation during its bomb runs by shifting the lead squadron into the highest position, the second squadron overlapping it in trail and 150 ft (46 m) lower, and the third squadron in file behind the second and another 150 feet lower. This produced devastatingly accurate bombing results in the last months of the war.

== Fifteenth Air Force formations ==
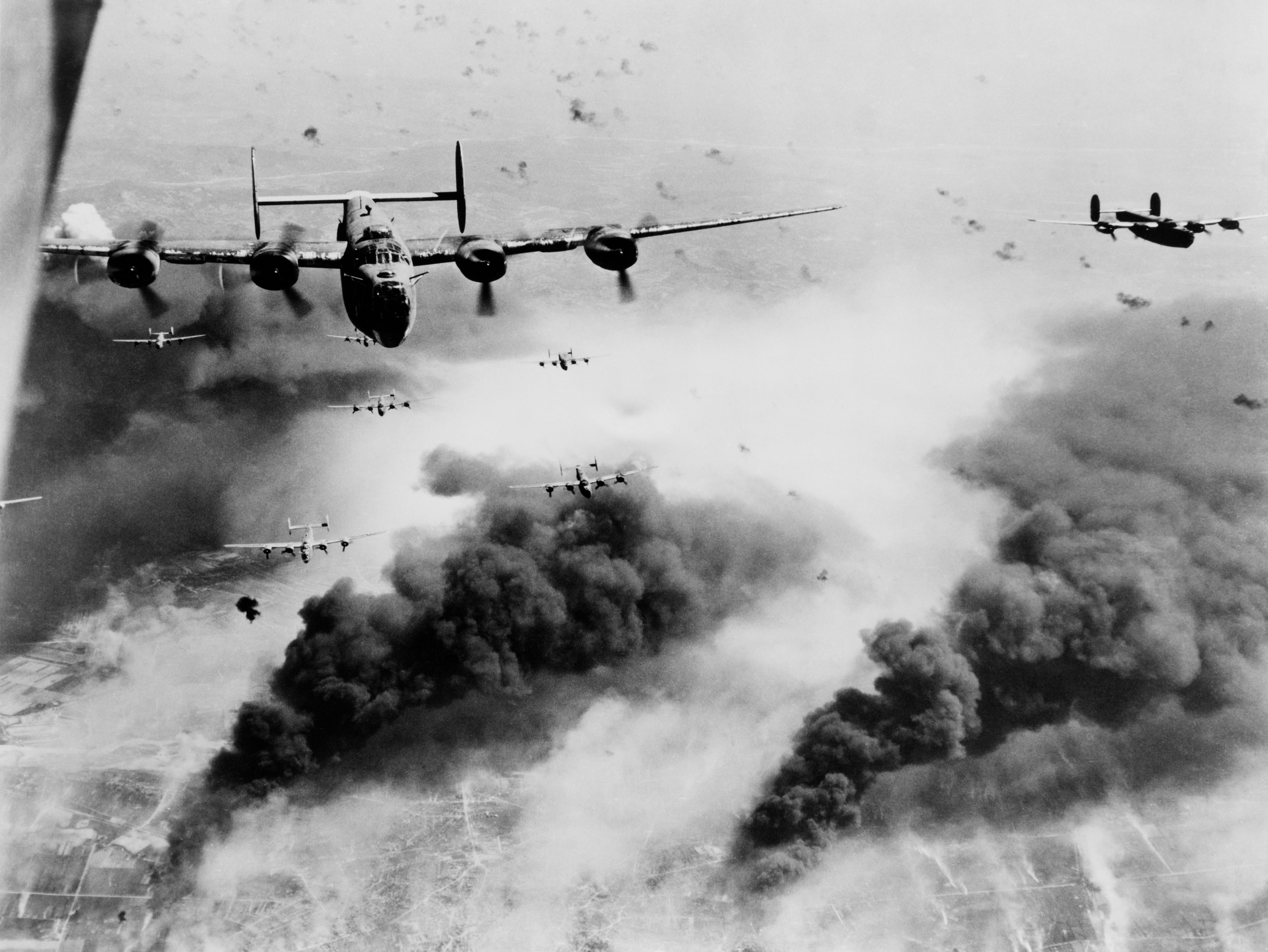
Fifteenth Air Force B-24Ds fly through flak after hitting the Concordia Vega oil refinery in Ploiești, Romania, on 31 May 1944.

The Fifteenth Air Force, consisting of a preponderance of B-24 groups flying at altitudes 5,000 feet (1,500 m) or lower than those flown by the B-17 groups in the Eighth Air Force, employed a larger group box during the period of December 1943 to July 1944. Called the "six-box formation", it consisted of forty aircraft, with the group divided into two units of twenty B-24s, one behind the other, and each unit consisted of three squadron boxes.

The center squadron (known as Able Box) of the first unit was a composite formation of six aircraft containing the group leader, with the deputy leader flying on its wing. The other four aircraft of Able Box were from the two squadrons assigned to the unit for that mission, with the six bombers formed in two vee formations in trail and stepped lower in altitude. On each side of the lead squadron were seven-bomber boxes called Baker Box (to the right) and Charlie Box (to the left), each box made up of bombers of one squadron, also in vees of three, with one additional bomber flying in the slot of the center rear (sixth position) of each squadron box, and known as "Tail-end Charlie". This seventh position was usually flown by the least experienced crew in the squadron and was vulnerable to fighter attack, so perilous that it was commonly called the "coffin corner" or "Purple Heart corner". The second unit of the group formation was configured identically, except that its boxes were named Dog, Easy, and Fox. Each position within a box was numbered, so that the group leader flew the Able One position while the Tail-end Charlie of the leftmost rear squadron flew Fox Seven. The second unit flew at an altitude approximately 500 ft (150 m) lower than the first unit.

Because it was laterally wide, the six-box formation was not a compact formation, was cumbersome to fly, and thus was less efficient in bombing accuracy. The Fifteenth Air Force adopted the diamond formation during the summer of 1944 to increase its bombing accuracy, but this also had the negative consequences of increasing losses to flak. This formation reduced the number of boxes from six to four, each flying three elements of three planes each with a Tail-end Charlie. As with the six-box formation, the trailing elements were stacked downward from the high leader, and the Tail-end Charlie of the fourth box (Dog Ten) was still often referred to as "the Purple Heart position". The four-box formation proved easier to assemble and organize, provided a tight bomb pattern, and concentrated defensive firepower against fighter attacks.

== See also ==
- Bomber stream
