= Fiat A.10 =

1910s Italian piston aircraft engine

A.10
- Type: Piston engine
- Manufacturer: Fiat
- Number built: 15,000
- Developed into: Fiat A.12

The Fiat A.10 was an Italian 6-cylinder, liquid-cooled, in-line aero engine of World War I. The A.10 was succeeded by the larger A.12. Fiat produced over 15,000 engines during World War I.

== Applications ==
- Caproni Ca.1
- Caproni Ca.2
- Caproni Ca.32
- SIA 5

== Specifications (Fiat A.10) ==
Data from Fiat A-10 - wwiaviation.com/

=== General characteristics ===
- Type: 6-cylinder, liquid-cooled, in-line engine
- Displacement: 9.5 L (580 cu in)
- Length: 1,470 mm (57.8 in)
- Width: 400 mm (15.74 in)
- Height: 820 mm (32.3 in)
- Dry weight: 190 kg (419 lb)

=== Components ===
- Fuel system: Carburretor

=== Performance ===
- Power output: 100 hp (74 kW)

== See also ==
Related lists

- List of aircraft engines
