= Push-pull configuration =

Combination of forward- and aft-mounted propellers on aircraft

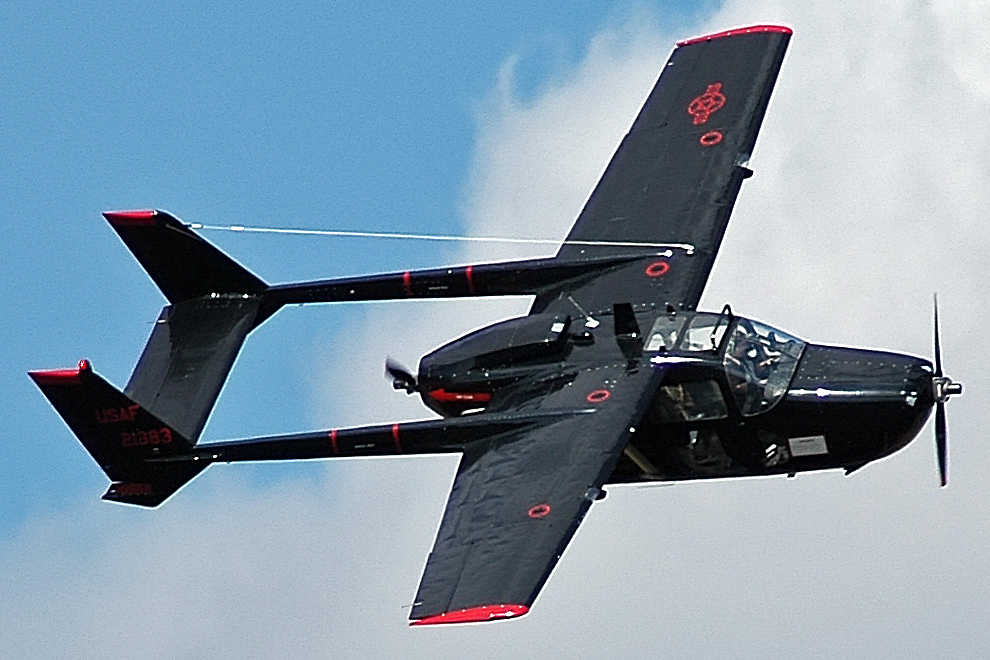
A Cessna O-2 Skymaster, a twin boom push-pull design

An aircraft constructed with a push-pull configuration has a combination of forward-mounted tractor (pull) propellers, and backward-mounted (pusher) propellers.

== Historical ==
The earliest known examples of "push-pull" engined-layout aircraft was the Short Tandem Twin.

An early pre-World War I example of a "push-pull" aircraft was the Caproni Ca.1 of 1914 which had two wing-mounted tractor propellers and one centre-mounted pusher propeller. Around 450 of these and their successor, the Ca.3 were built. One of the first to employ two engines on a common axis (tandem push-pull) was the one-off, ill-fated Siemens-Schuckert DDr.I fighter of 1917.

German World War I designs included the only Fokker twin-engined design of the period, the Fokker K.I from 1915; followed by the unusual Siemens-Schuckert DDr.I triplane fighter design of late 1917, and concluding with the laterally-offset "push-pull" Gotha G.VI bomber prototype of 1918.

Claudius Dornier embraced the concept, many of his flying boats using variations of the tandem "push-pull" engine layout, including the 1922 Dornier Wal, the 1938 Dornier Do 26, and the massive 1929 Dornier Do X, which had twelve engines driving six tractors and six pushers. A number of Farmans and Fokkers also had push-pull engine installations, such as the Farman F.121 Jabiru and Fokker F.32.

== Configuration ==
Push-pull designs have the engines mounted above the wing as Dornier flying boats or more commonly on a shorter fuselage than conventional one, as for Rutan Defiant or Voyager canard designs. Twin boomers such as the Cessna Skymaster and Adam A500 have the aircraft's tail suspended via twin booms behind the pusher propeller. In contrast, both the World War II-era Dornier Do 335 and the early 1960s-designed French Moynet M 360 Jupiter experimental private plane had their pusher propeller behind the tail.

== Design benefits ==
While pure pushers decreased in popularity during the First World War, the push-pull configuration has continued to be used. The advantage it provides is the ability to mount two propellers on the aircraft's centreline, thereby avoiding the increased drag that comes with twin wing-mounted engines. It is also easier to fly if one of the two engines fails, as the thrust provided by the remaining engine stays in the centerline. In contrast, a conventional twin-engine aircraft will yaw in the direction of the failed engine and become uncontrollable below a certain airspeed, known as V_{MC}.

== Design problems ==
The rear engine operates in the disturbed air from the forward engine, which may reduce its efficiency to 85% of the forward engine. In addition the rear engine can interfere with the aircraft's rotation during takeoff if installed in the tail, or they require additional compromise to be made to ensure clearance. This is why they are more common on seaplanes, where this is not a concern.

== Piloting ==
Pilots in the United States who obtain a multi-engine rating in an aircraft with this push-pull, or "centerline thrust," configuration are restricted to flying centerline-thrust aircraft; pilots who obtain a multi-engine rating in conventional twin-engine aircraft do not have a similar limitation with regard to centerline-thrust aircraft. The limitation can be removed by further testing in a conventional multi-engine aircraft.

== Military application ==
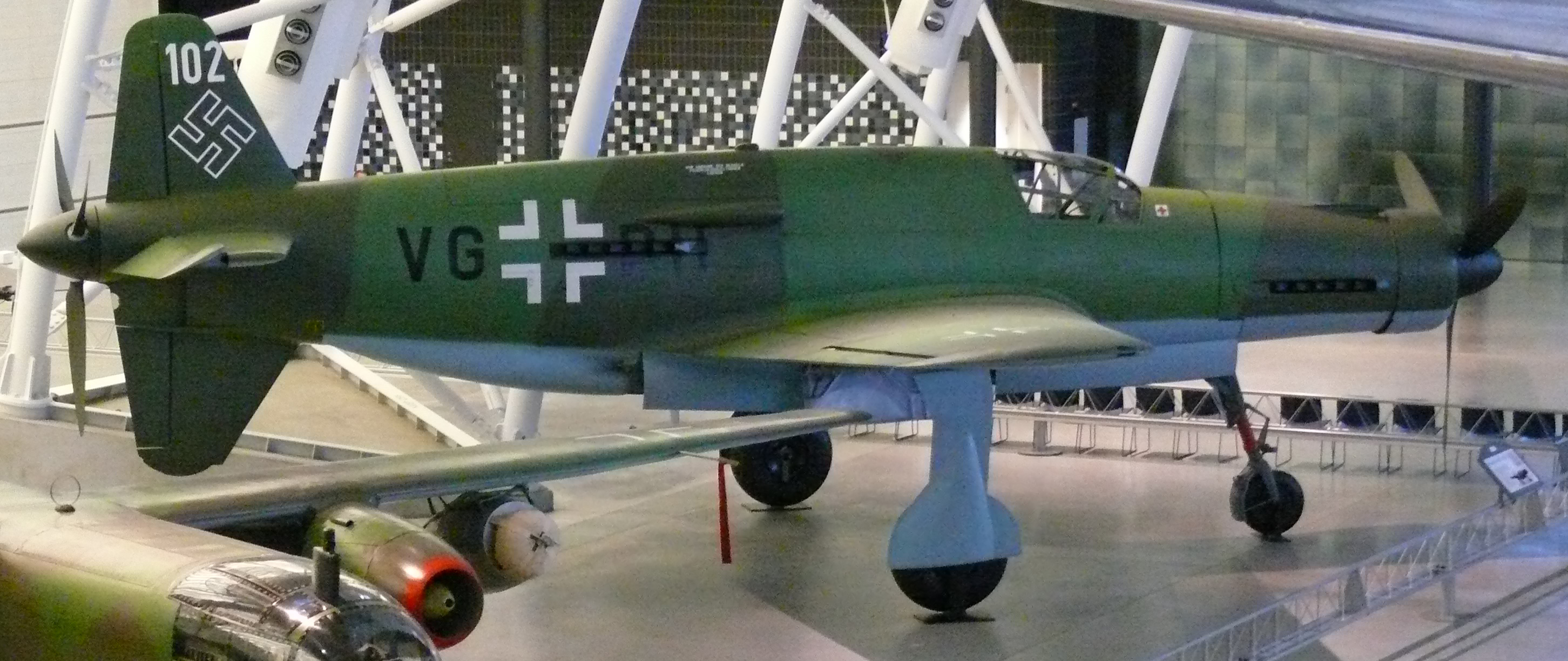
The only surviving Do 335 at the Steven F. Udvar-Hazy Center near Washington, DC

Despite its advantages push-pull configurations are rare in military aircraft. In addition to the problems noted for civil aircraft, the increased risk to the pilot in the case of a crash or the need to parachute from the aircraft also pose problems. During a crash the rear engine may crush the pilot and if bailing out, the pilot is in danger of hitting the propeller. Examples of past military applications include the aforementioned Siemens-Schuckert DDr.I twin-engined triplane and the Gotha G.VI, with its engines mounted on the front and rear ends of two separate fuselages. More successful was the Italian Caproni Ca.3 trimotor, with two tractor engines and one pusher. Between the wars, most push-pull aircraft were flying boats, of which the Dornier Wal was probably the most numerous, while a number of heavy bombers, such as the Farman F.220 used engines mounted in push-pull pairs under the wings. Near the end of World War II, the German Dornier Do 335 push-pull twin-engined, Zerstörer-candidate heavy fighter featured explosive charges to jettison the rear propeller and dorsal tailfin, a manually-jettisonable main canopy, as well as an ejection seat. One of the last military aircraft to use the configuration was the American Cessna O-2, which was used for forward air control during the Vietnam War.

== Images ==
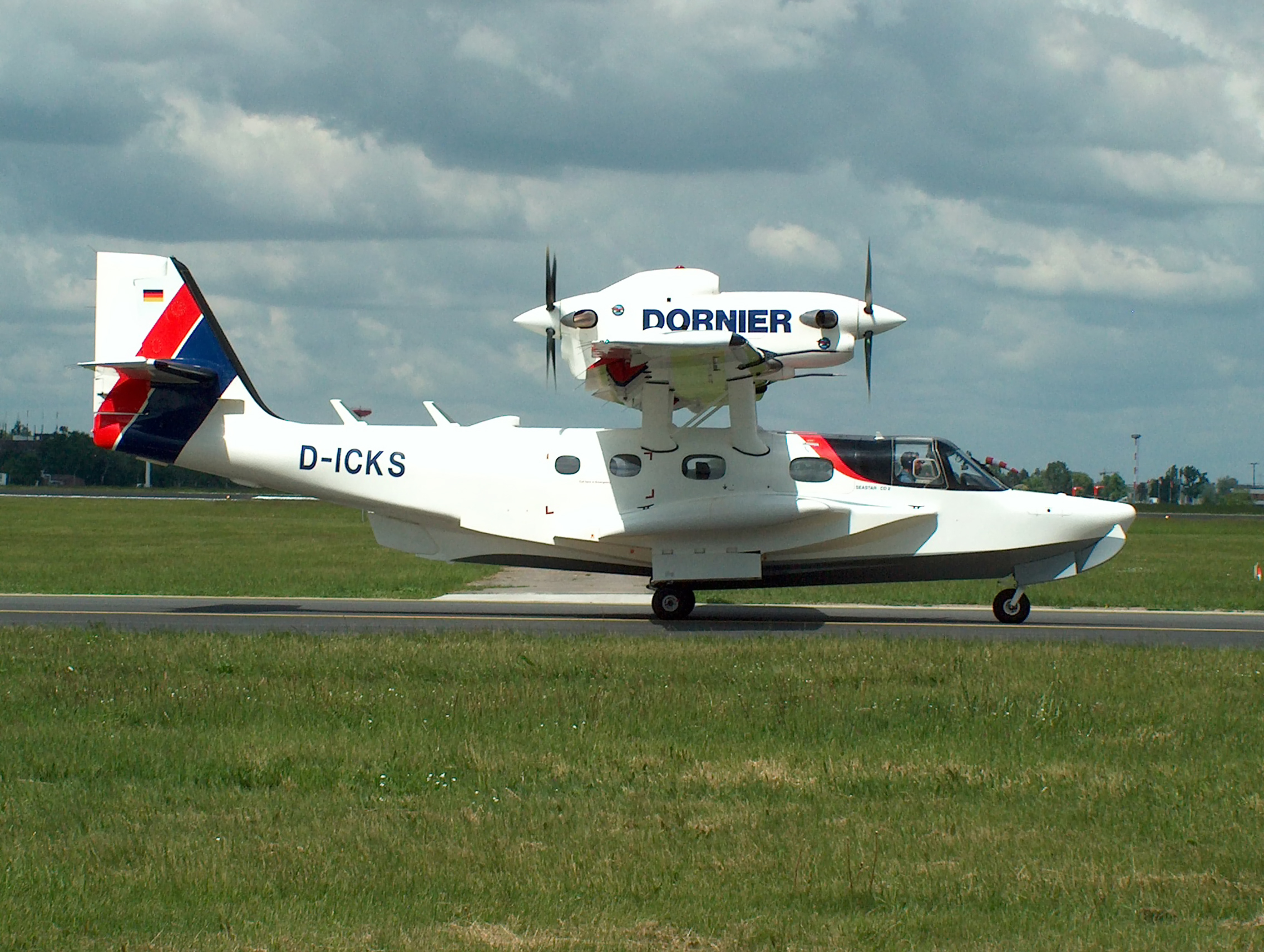
Dornier Seawings Seastar

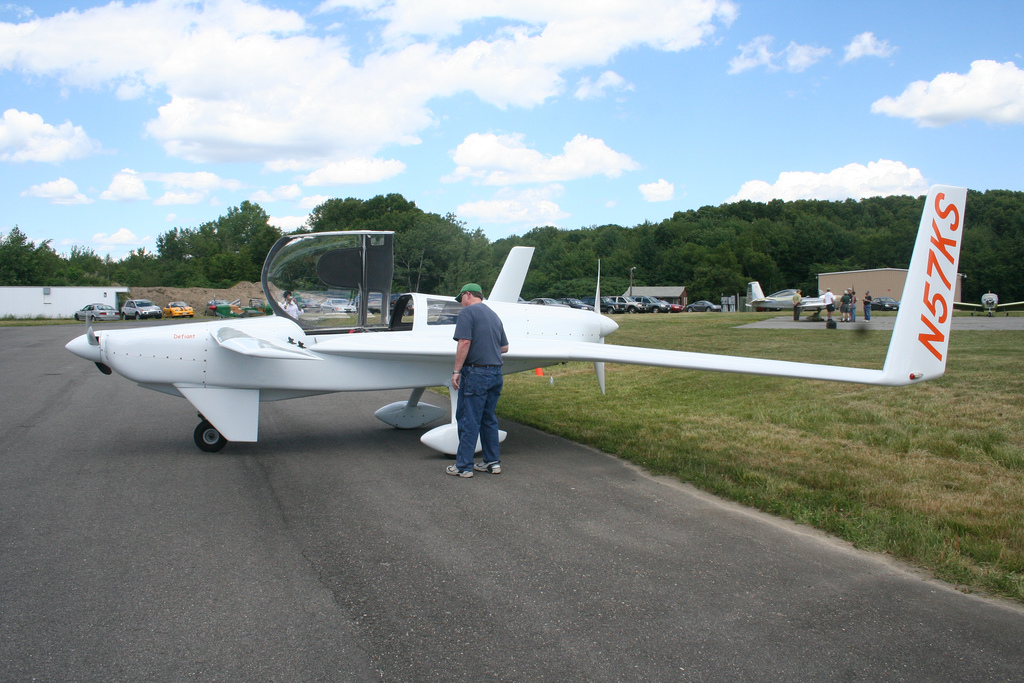
Rutan Model 40 Defiant

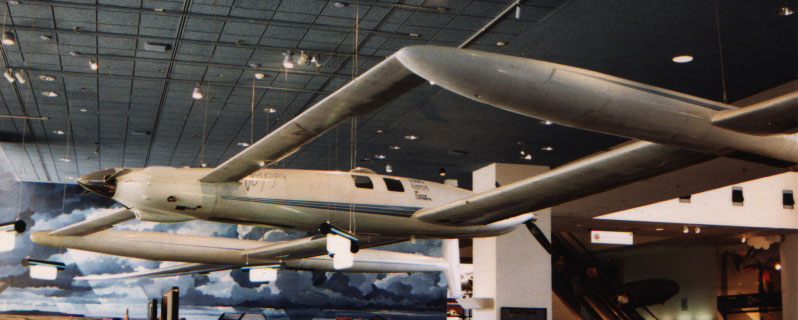
Rutan Model 76 Voyager

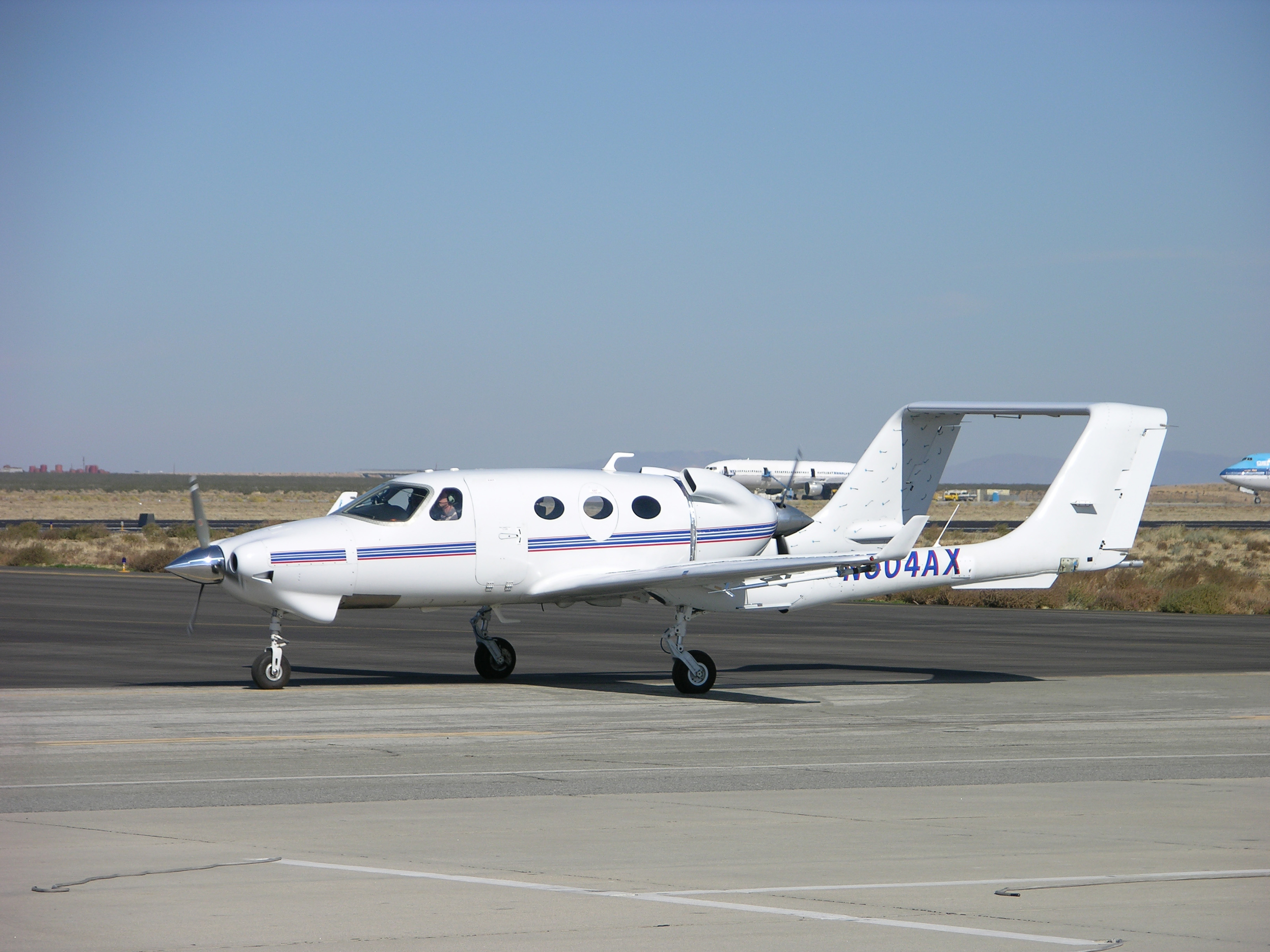
Adam A500

== See also ==
- Tractor configuration
- Pusher configuration
