= Assembly ship =

Type of aircraft

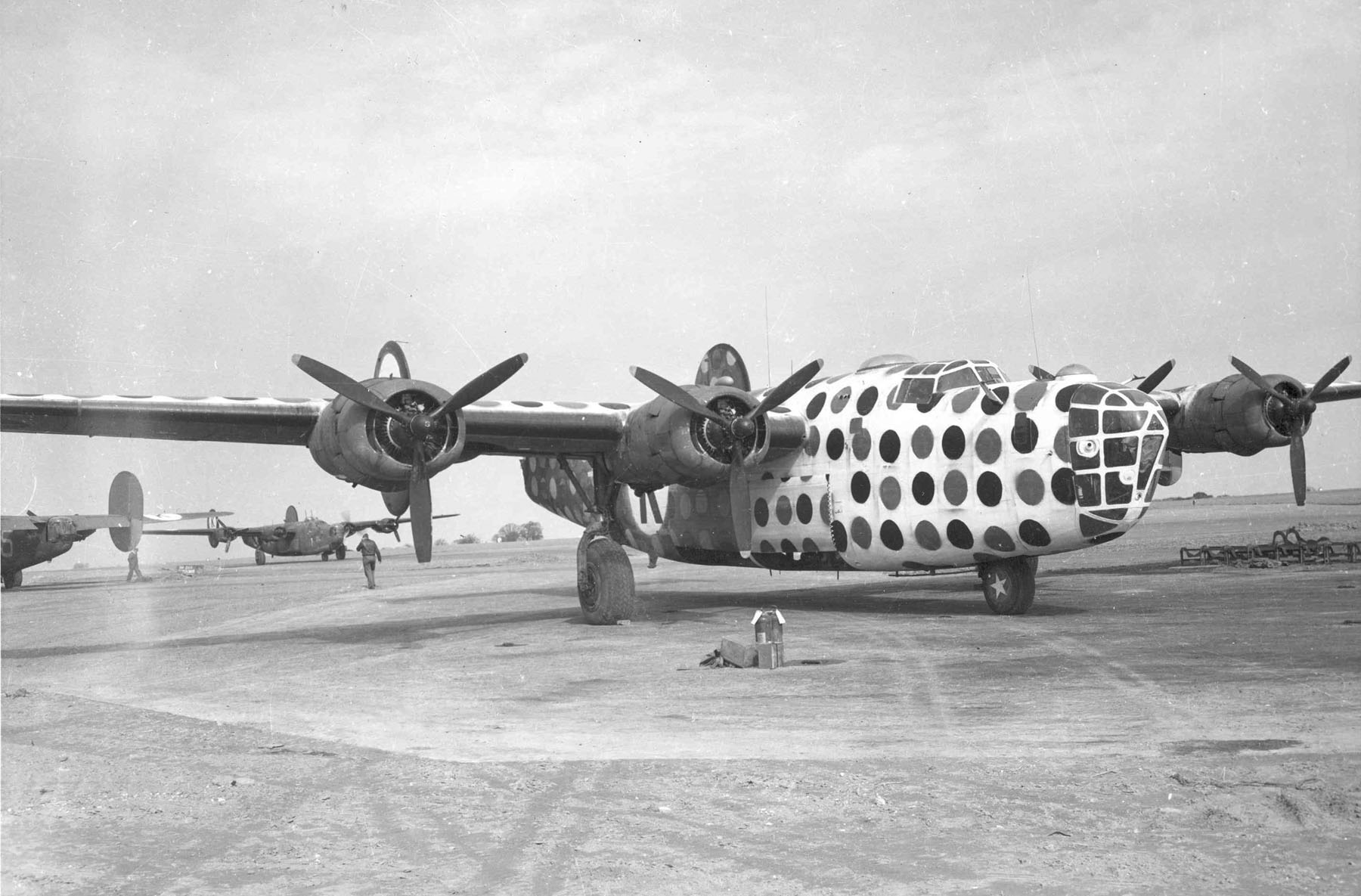
First Sergeant, a B-24 Liberator assembly ship of the 458th Bombardment Group with a polka-dot paint scheme. This B-24 was destroyed on May 27, 1944 in a flare accident on the runway.

An assembly ship (also known as a formation ship or Judas goat) was a Boeing B-17 Flying Fortress or Consolidated B-24 Liberator bomber (usually an older model) that was stripped down of its armaments and given extra flares, navigational equipment, and unique distinctive paint scheme in order to organize combat box formations more quickly.

== History ==
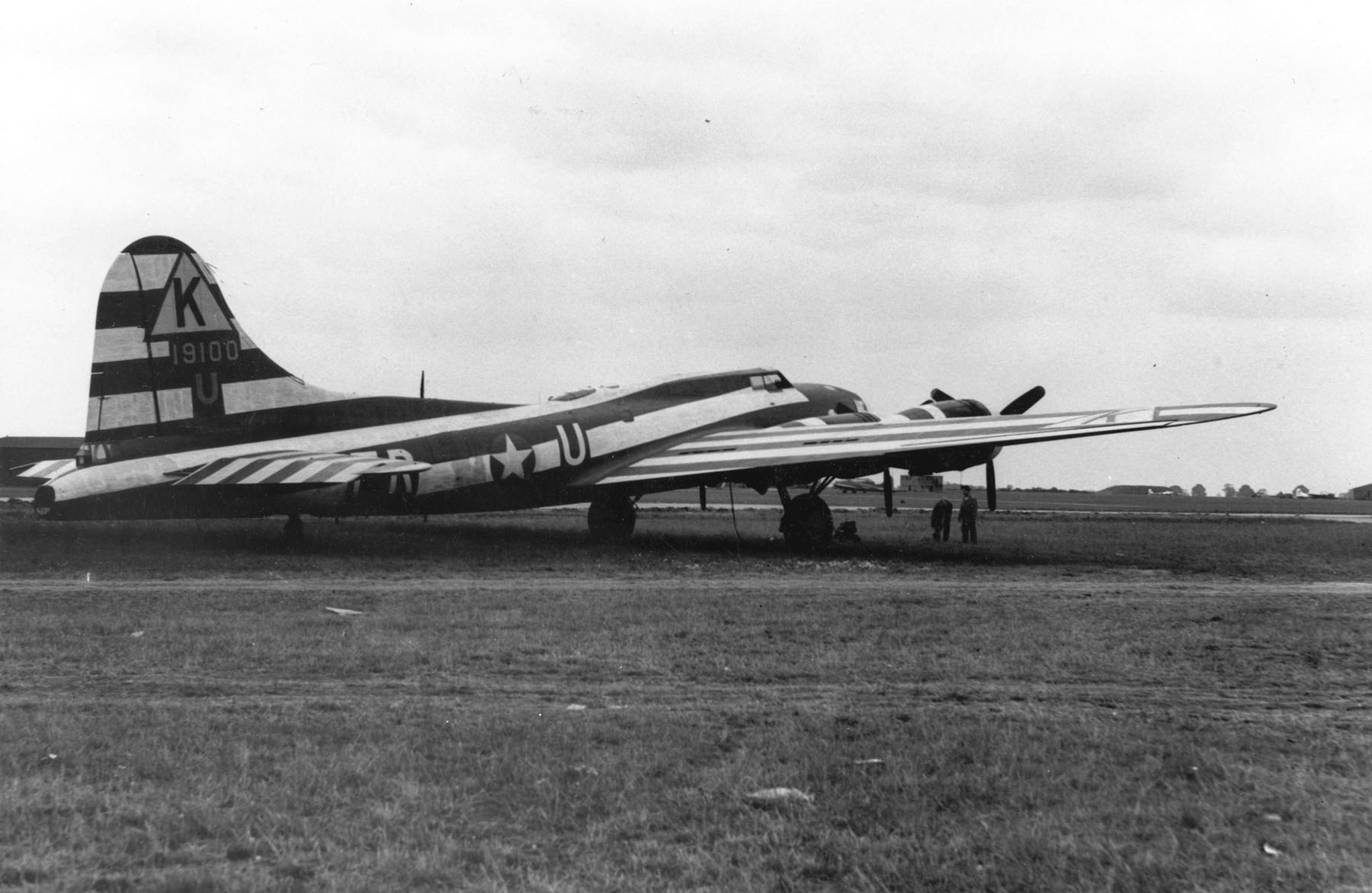
A B-17E Flying Fortress in use as an assembly ship, wearing a striped pattern paint scheme

Due to the threat of fighters to US Army Air Force bombers during daylight raids, tight bomber formations began to be employed in order to maximize defensive firepower and to concentrate bombs on the designated target. However, these formations required time to assemble and in 1943 the idea of using older model bombers to guide the others was devised. The USAAF hoped to ideally assemble bomber formations within an hour. However this often required two to three hours as planes from multiple airfields required coordination, all under radio silence so as to not tip off the Germans to the impending raid.

Assembly ships had their armaments removed and carried a skeleton crew of two pilots, navigator, radio operator and one or two flare operators. They were given additional flares, flare ammunition (of a particular color), navigational equipment (including navigational lights) and unique paint schemes. Each paint scheme was unique, and different flare colors were carried by each assembly ship in order to more quickly organize the pilots of a particular bomber formation. Once the bomber formations formed up, the assembly ships would link up with other groups before returning to base. However, there was an instance where a B-24 nicknamed "Spotted Ass Ape" continued with its bomber formation all the way to its target in Germany. The use of combat boxes and thus assembly ships continued throughout the war even after long-range fighter escorts like the North American P-51 Mustang and Lockheed P-38 Lightning were put into service.

== Recall aircraft ==
A similarly painted aircraft called a recall aircraft existed at primary training fields in the United States. Due to the fact that PT-17s lacked a radio, an aircraft specially painted with stripes was used to indicate that students should return home if there was bad weather or another emergency.

== See also ==
- Combat box
- Dazzle camouflage
- Eighth Air Force
- Station hack
