= Caproni Ca.1 (1914) =

World War One era Italian bomber

Ca.1 (1914)
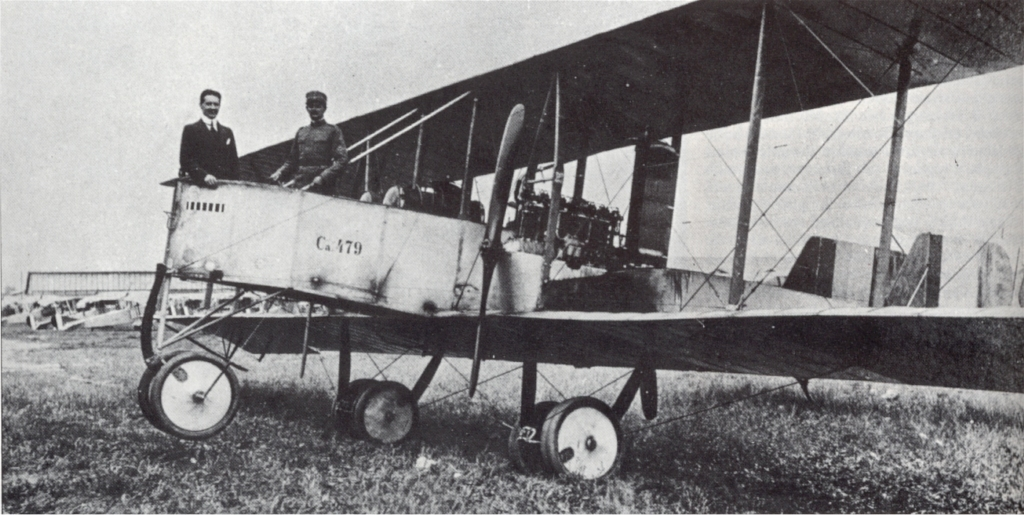

General information
- Type: Heavy day bomber
- National origin: Italy
- Manufacturer: Caproni
- Number built: 162

History
- First flight: Late 1914

The Caproni Ca.1 was an Italian heavy bomber of the World War I era.

== Development and design ==
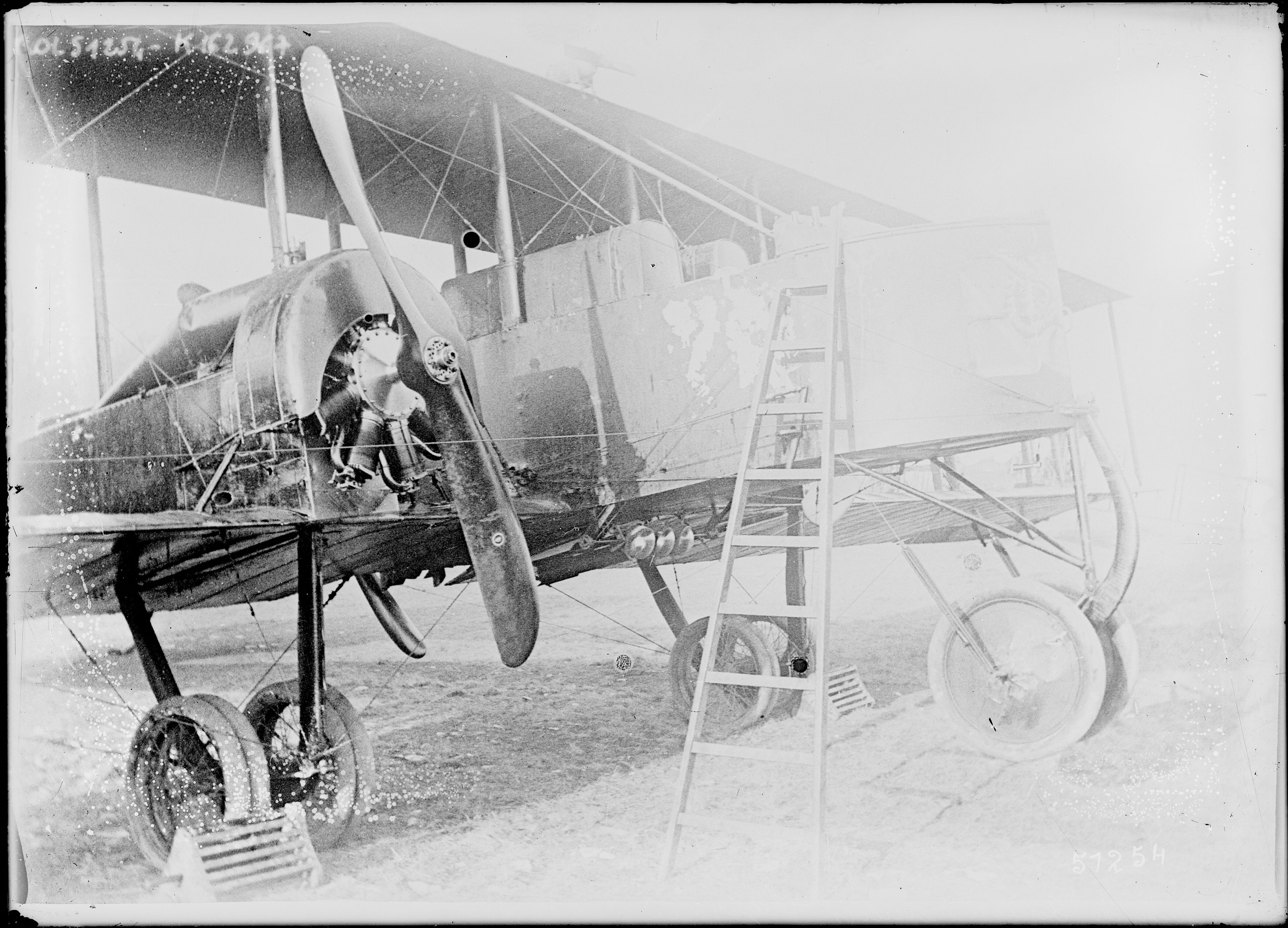
A Caproni Ca.1 with three Gnome rotary engines

The Ca.1 was a three-engine biplane of fabric-covered wooden construction. It had four crew members in an open central nacelle: two pilots, a front gunner, and rear gunner-mechanic, who manned upper machine guns, standing upon the central engine in a protective cage, just in front of the rear propeller. The Ca.1 had a tricycle landing gear.

Italy and Russia were the first countries to start developing a heavy bomber capability before World War I. The first heavy bomber, designed by Gianni Caproni was a twin-boom biplane, featuring a layout that included three 67 kW (80 hp) Gnome rotary engines housed one behind the other in a central nacelle, the rearmost driving a pusher propeller, and the other two driving tractor propellers mounted on the fronts of the two booms. Referred to by Caproni as the Caproni 260 hp and retrospectively, after the war, as the Ca.30), this design flew in a slightly modified form (later called the Ca.31) in October 1914.

Test flights revealed the power to be insufficient and the engine layout unworkable. Caproni altered the aircraft, retaining the pusher engine in its original location and moving the other two engines to the front of the booms, directly driving the propellers. With more powerful inline engines, the air arm of the Italian Army became interested in purchasing the Caproni 300 hp (later known as the Ca.32), which they designated the Ca.1. A total of 166 aircraft were delivered between August 1915 and December 1916.

Some Ca.1s survived the war to be rebuilt as airliners, able to carry up to six passengers. This conversion became known as the Ca.56 in Caproni's postwar naming scheme.

There is some variation in published sources over early Caproni designations. The confusion stems, in part, from three separate schemes used to designate these aircraft – Caproni's in-house designations of the time, those used by the Italian Army, and designations created after the war by Caproni to refer to past designs.

== Operational history ==
The Ca.1 entered service with the Italian Army in the middle of 1915 and first saw action on August 20, 1915, attacking the Austrian air base at Aisovizza. Fifteen bomber squadrons (1-15 Squadriglia) were eventually equipped with Ca.1, Ca.2, and Ca.3 bombers, bombing mostly targets in Austria-Hungary. The 12th squadron operated in Libya. In 1918 three squadrons (3, 14 and 15) operated in France.

== Operators ==
Kingdom of Italy

- Corpo Aeronautico Militare

== Specifications ==
Data from

General characteristics

- Crew: 4
- Length: 36 ft 3 in (11.05 m)
- Wingspan: 74 ft 7 in (22.74 m)
- Height: 12 ft 2 in (3.70 m)
- Wing area: 1,029 sq ft (95.6 m^{2})
- Empty weight: 7,264 lb (3,302 kg)
- Gross weight: 8,800 lb (4,000 kg)

Performance

- Maximum speed: 75 mph (120 km/h, 65 kn)
- Range: 344 mi (550 km, 299 nmi)
- Service ceiling: 13,120 ft (4,000 m)

Armament

- Guns: 2 × 6.5 mm FIAT-Revelli machine guns
- Bombs: Bombs mounted under the hull

== See also ==
- Push-pull configuration

Related lists

- List of bomber aircraft
- List of World War I Entente aircraft
