= List of Russian explorers =

Russian explorers

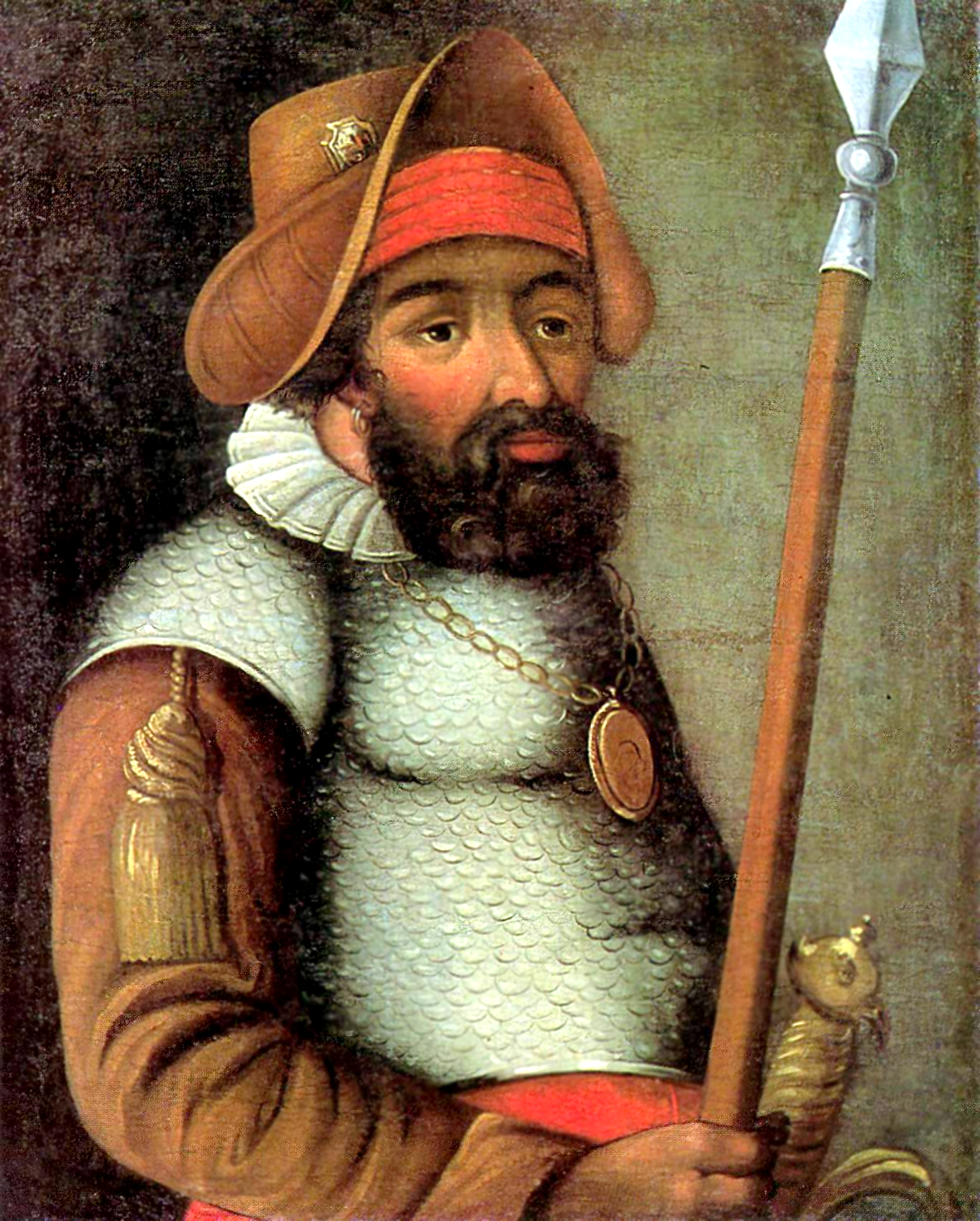
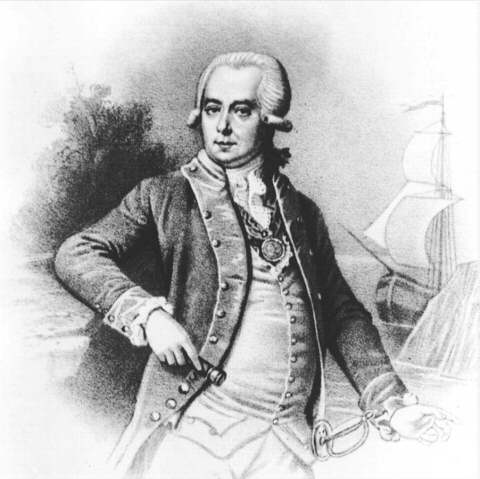
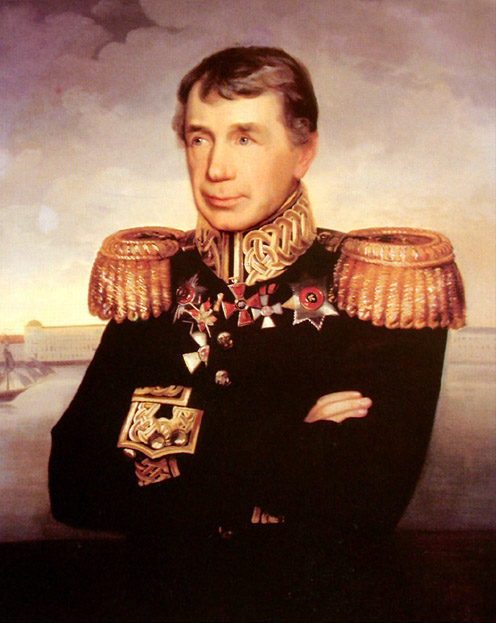
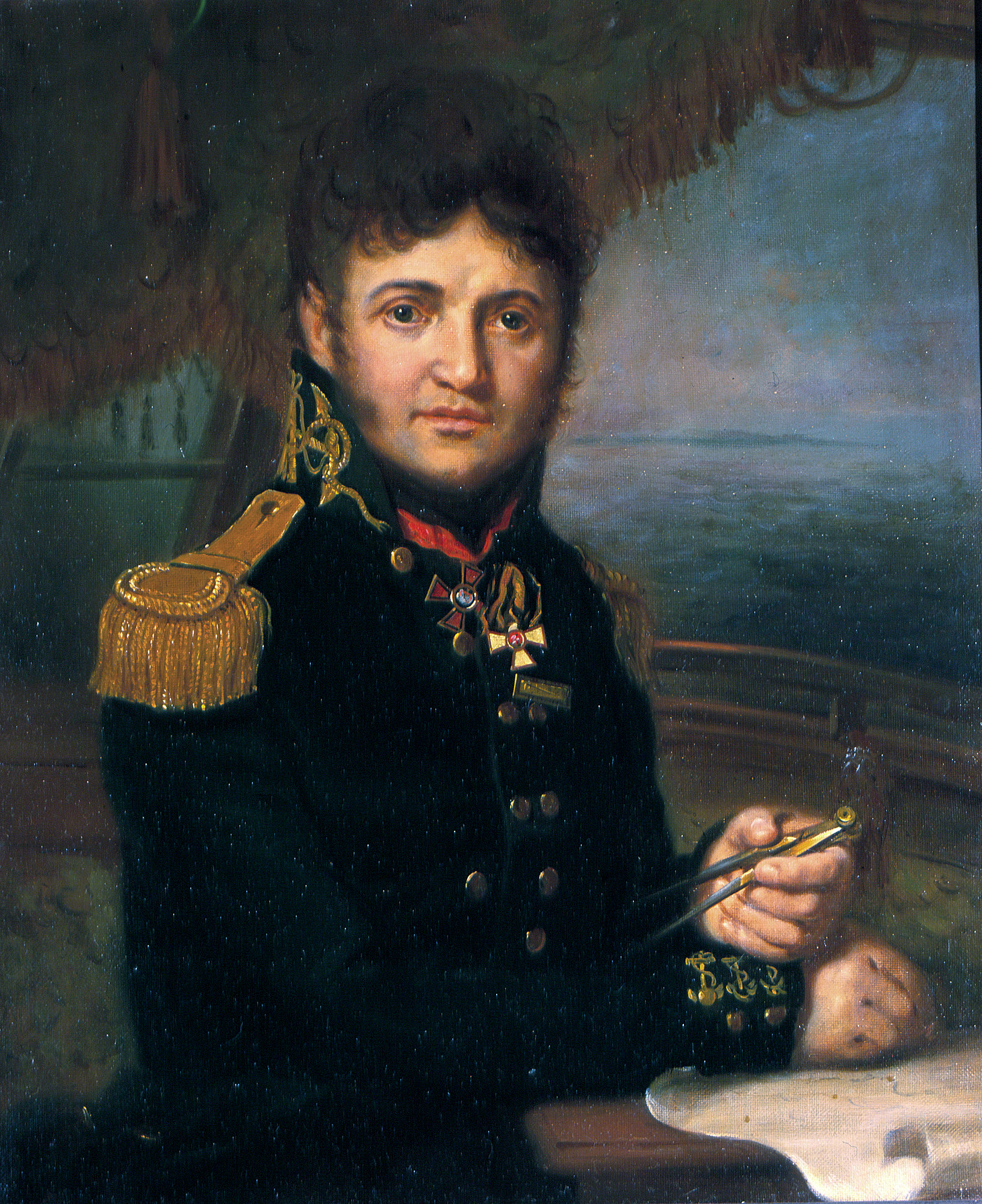
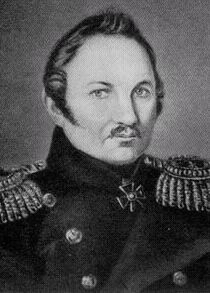
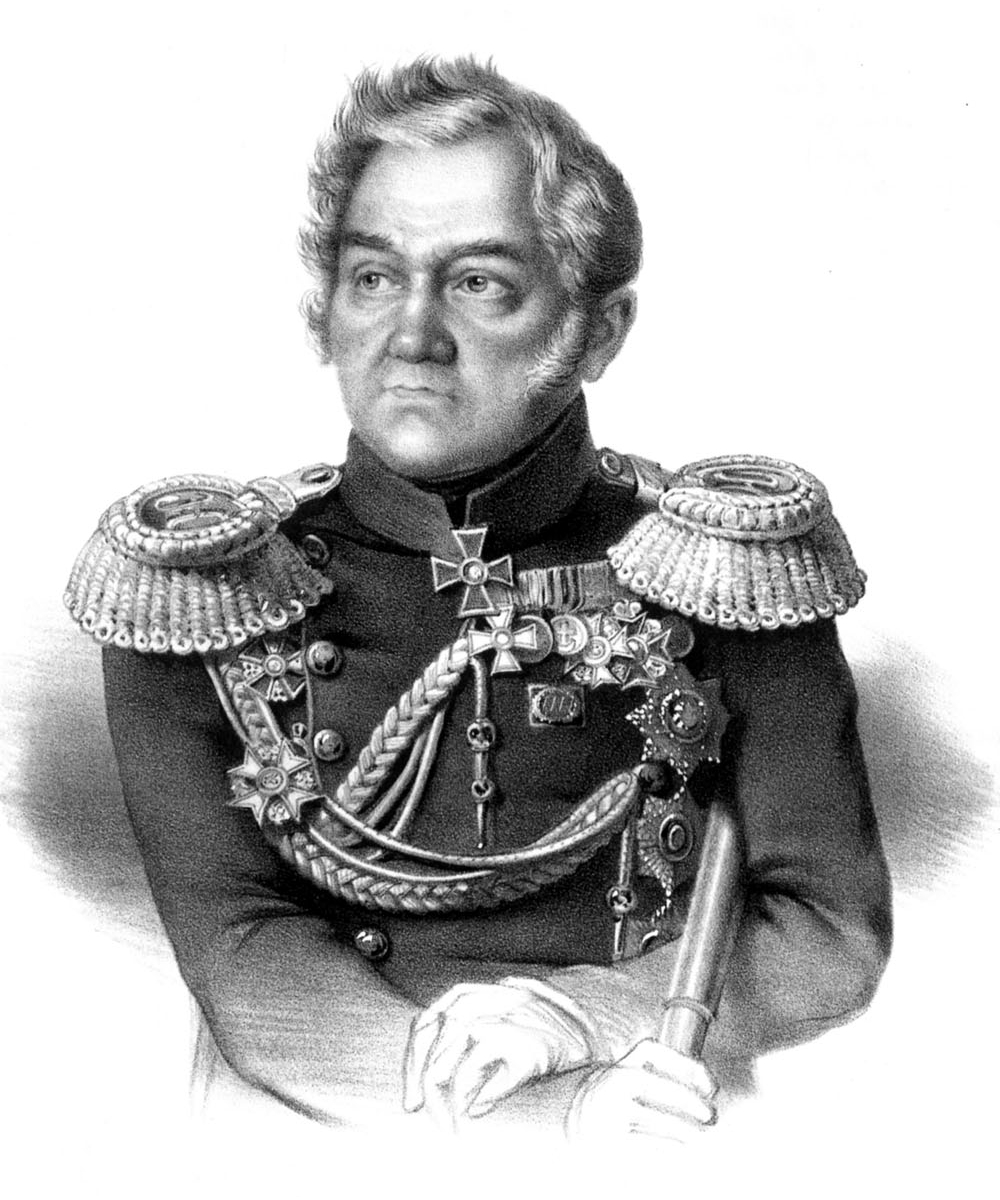
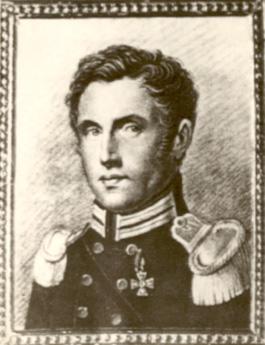
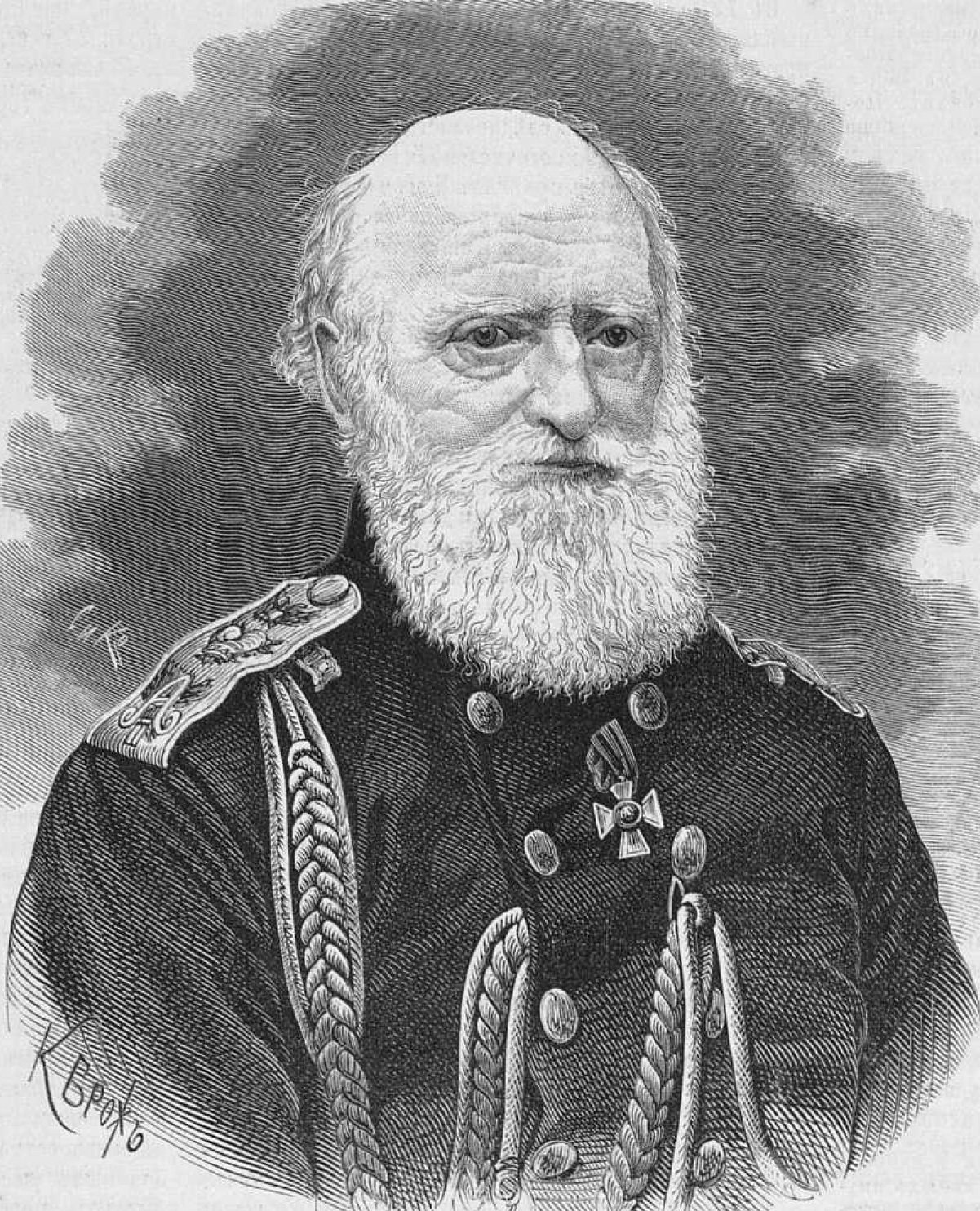
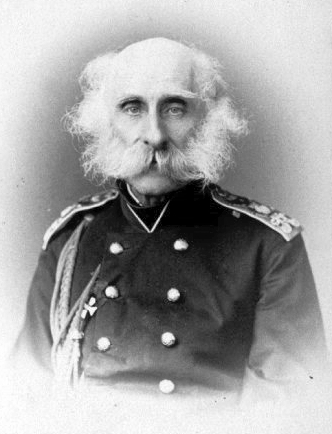
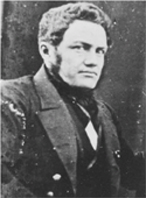
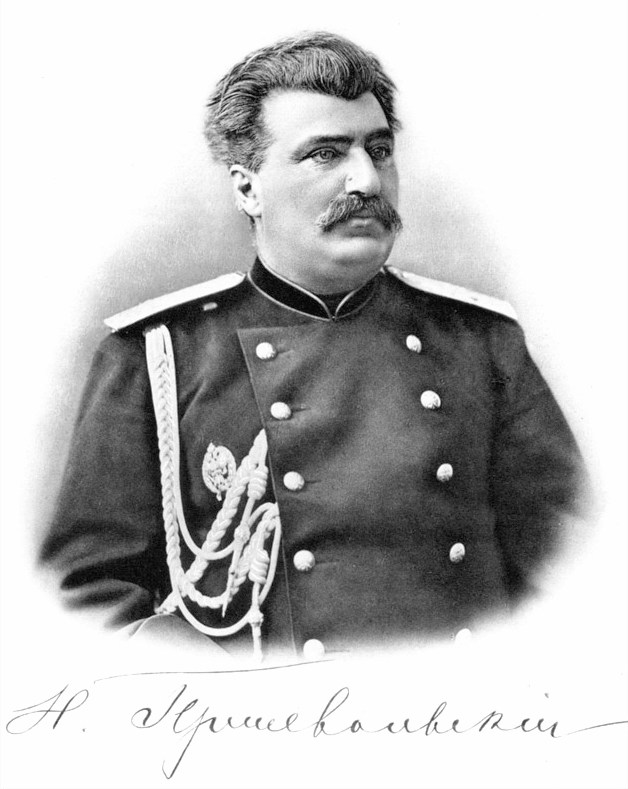
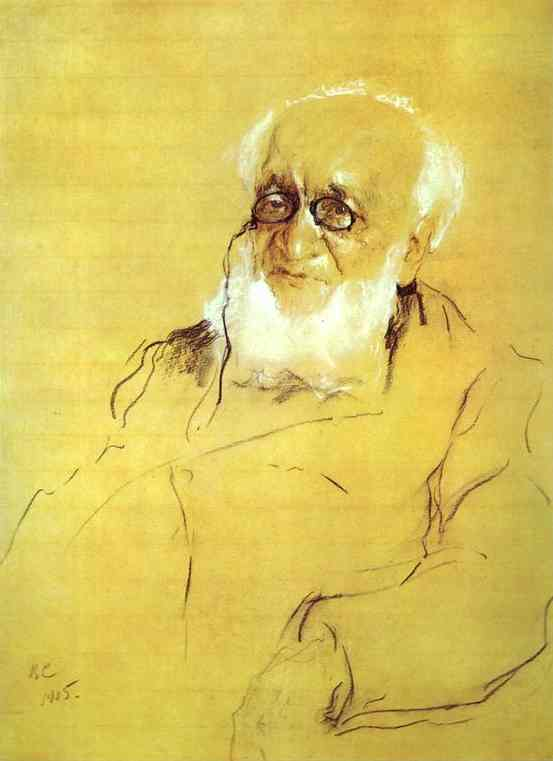
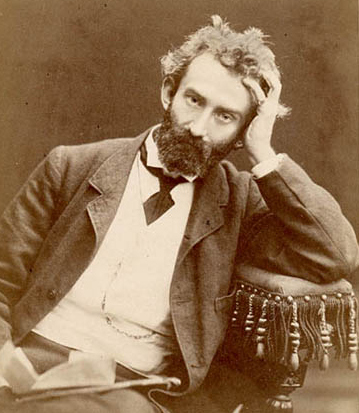
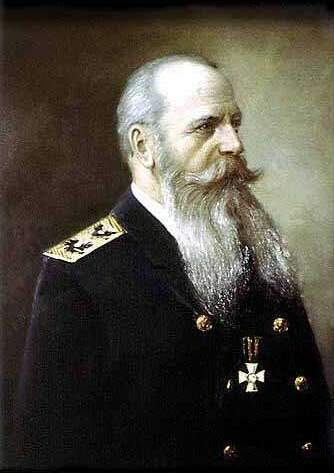
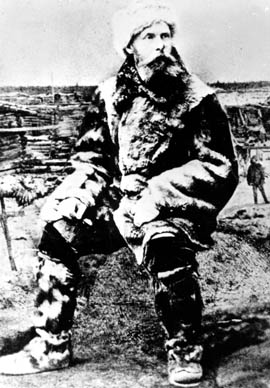
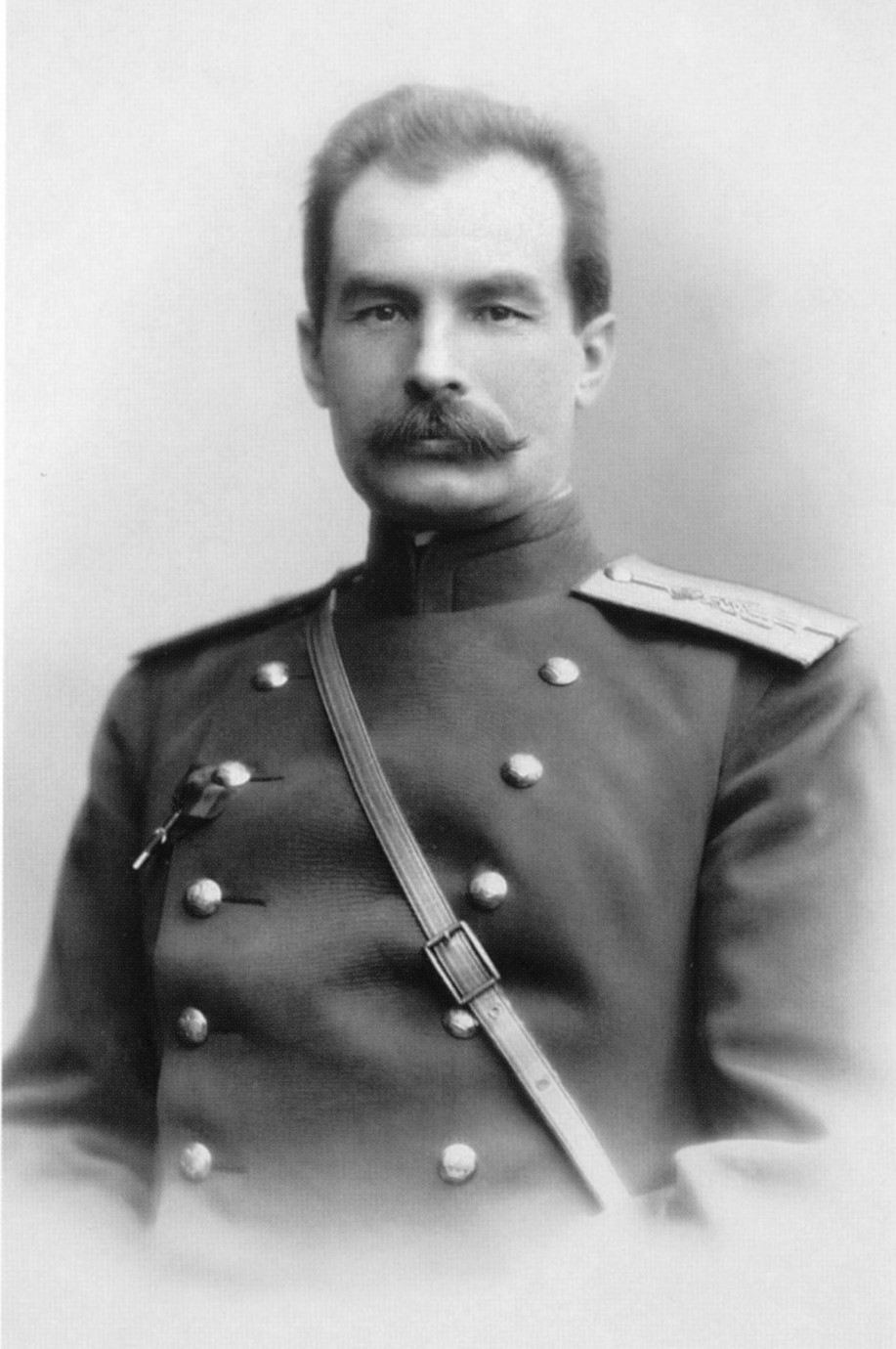
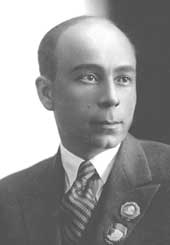
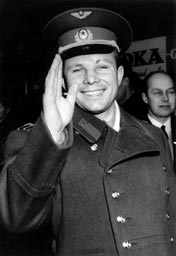
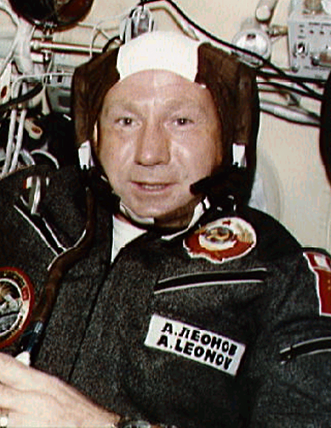
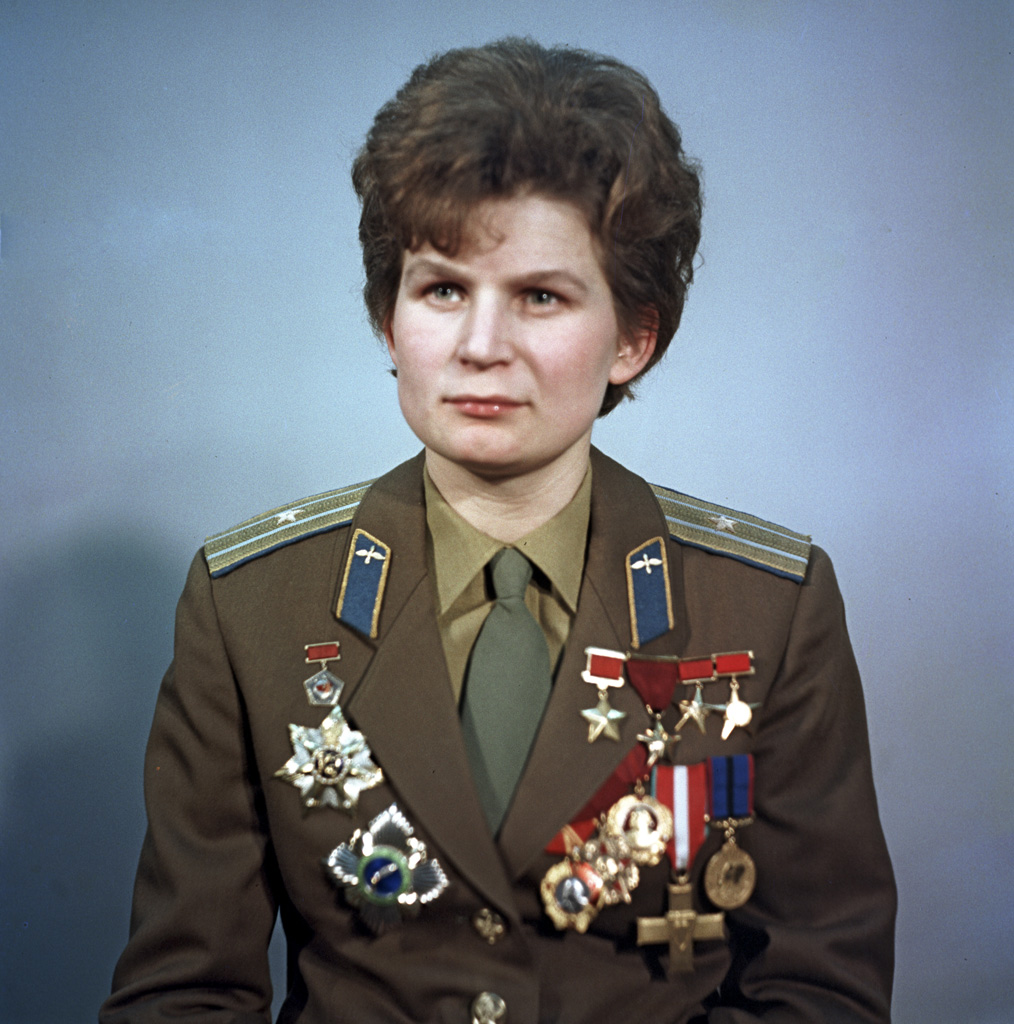
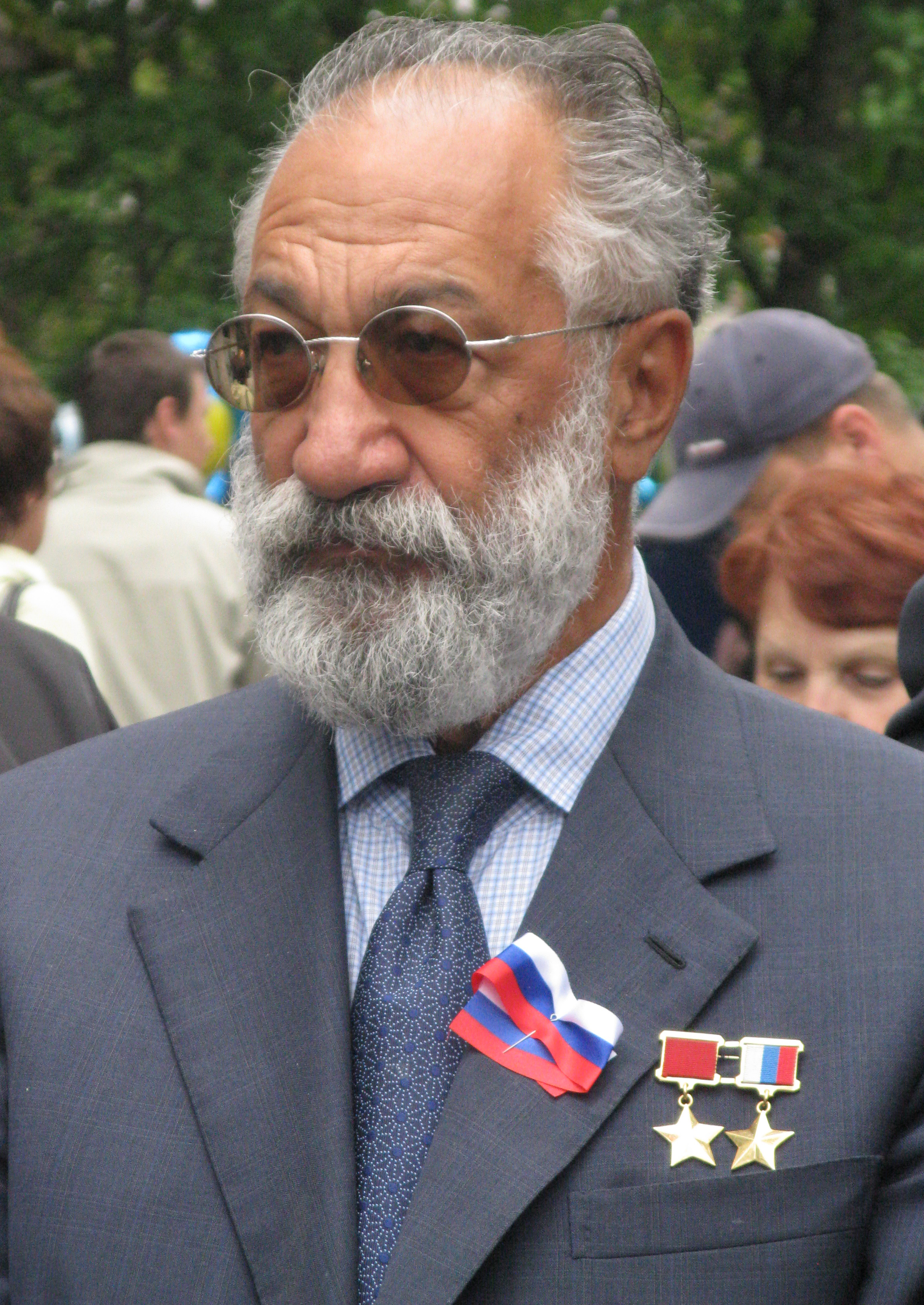
| Yermak | Dezhnyov | Shelikhov | Kruzenstern |
| Lisyansky | Bellingshausen | Lazarev | Kotzebue |
| Wrangel | Litke | Middendorff | Przewalski |
| Semyonov | Miklouho-Maclay | Makarov | Toll |
| Kozlov | Ushakov | Gagarin | Leonov |
| Tereshkova | Chilingarov |

The history of exploration by citizens or subjects of the Russian Federation, the Soviet Union, the Russian Empire, the Tsardom of Russia and other Russian predecessor states forms a significant part of the history of Russia as well as the history of the world. At 17,075,400 square kilometres (6,592,850 sq mi), Russia is the largest country in the world, covering more than a ninth of Earth's landmass. In the times of the Soviet Union and the Russian Empire, the country's share in the world's landmass reached 1/6. Most of these territories were first discovered by Russian explorers (if indigenous peoples of inhabited territories are not counted). Contiguous exploration in Eurasia and the building of overseas colonies in Russian America were some of the primary factors in Russian territorial expansion.

Apart from their discoveries in Alaska, Central Asia, Siberia, and the northern areas surrounding the North Pole, Russian explorers have made significant contributions to the exploration of the Antarctic, Arctic, and the Pacific islands, as well as deep-sea and space explorations.

== Alphabetical list ==
Areas primarily explored

| * Siberia/the Far East | ^ Alaska/North Pacific | ~ Europe | † Tropics |
| ‡ Arctic/the Far North | § Antarctic/South Pacific | ! Central Asia | $ Space |

=== A ===
| Portrait | Person | Achievements | Image |
|---|---|---|---|
| Albanov | Valerian Albanov‡ (1881–1919); Russian Navy lieutenant | Albanov was one of the only two survivors of the ill-fated 1912–14 Brusilov expedition, the other being Alexander Konrad. They left the ice-bound ship St. Anna and by ski, sledge, and kayak crossed the Kara Sea, reached Franz Josef Land and were finally rescued by Georgy Sedov's Saint Phocas. The data about ice drift of St. Anna, provided by Albanov, helped Vladimir Vize to calculate the coordinates of previously unknown Vize Island. Either Albanov or Konrad is a prototype for a hero in the novel The Two Captains by Veniamin Kaverin. | St. Anna |
| Anjou | Pyotr Anjou‡ (1796–1869); Russian admiral, hero of the Battle of Navarino | In 1820, as a lieutenant, Anjou described the coastline and the islands of Eastern Siberia between the Olenek and Indigirka rivers and mapped the New Siberian Islands. In 1825–26 he participated in describing the northeastern coast of the Caspian Sea and the western coast of the Aral Sea. Named in honor: Anjou Islands. | New Siberian Islands |
| | Danila Antsiferov* (?–1712); Siberian Cossack ataman | Danila Antsiferov was elected Cossack ataman on Kamchatka after the death of Vladimir Atlasov. He was one of the first Russians to visit the Kuril Islands and describe them in writing, including Shumshu and Paramushir Island. Named in honor: Antsiferov Island. | Paramushir, Atlasov and Shumshu Islands |
| Anuchin | Dmitry Anuchin† (1843–1923) geographer, anthropologist, ethnographer, archaeologist | In 1880 Anuchin researched Valday Hills and Lake Seliger. In 1894–95, joining the expedition of Alexei Tillo, he again studied Valday. Anuchin finally determined the location of the source of the Volga River, the largest European river. He published a major work about the relief of European Russia and founded the Geography Museum at Moscow State University. Named in honor: Anuchin crater (Moon), Anuchin Island. | The source of the Volga River |
| Arsenyev | Vladimir Arsenyev* (1872–1930) military topographer, writer | Arsenyev wrote a number of popular books about his journeys to the Ussuri basin in 1902–07, where he was accompanied by Dersu Uzala, a native Nanai hunter. Arsenyev was the first to describe numerous species of Siberian flora; he produced some 60 works on the geography, wildlife and ethnography of the regions he traveled to. In 1975, the joint Japanese-Soviet movie Dersu Uzala by Akira Kurosawa won an Academy Award for the Best Foreign Language Film. Named in honor: Arsenyev (town). | Dersu Uzala, photo by Arsenyev |
| | Vladimir Atlasov* (1661/64–1711); Siberian Cossack ataman | Atlasov established the first permanent Russian settlements on Kamchatka Peninsula and led its colonisation. He was the first to present a detailed description of the region's nature and people, and also accounted on the lands near Kamchatka – Chukotka and Japan. Atlasov brought Dembei, a shipwrecked Japanese merchant, to Moscow, where he conducted the first Japanese language education in Russia. Named in honor: Atlasov Island, Atlasov volcano. | Topography of Kamchatka |

=== B ===
| Portrait | Person | Achievements | Image |
|---|---|---|---|
| Mikhail Babushkin | Mikhail Babushkin‡ (1893–1938) military and polar aviator, Hero of the Soviet Union | Babushkin took part in an expedition to rescue Umberto Nobile in 1928, and in the rescue of the SS Chelyuskin crew in 1933. He performed the flights to the first drifting ice station North Pole-1 in 1937. In 1937–38 he participated in a search for Sigizmund Levanevsky. Named in honor: Babushkinsky District (Moscow), Babushkinskaya (Moscow Metro). | SS Chelyuskin sinking |
| Konstantin Badigin | Konstantin Badygin‡ (1910–1984); Soviet Navy captain, writer, scientist, Hero of the USSR (Badygin left, Sedov's mechanic D.G. Trofimov right) | In 1938 Badygin became the captain of the ice-captured icebreaker Sedov, turned into a kind of drifting ice station. Most of the crew was evacuated, but 15 sailors and scientists, including Vladimir Vize, stayed aboard and carried out valuable scientific research in the course of 812 days. After drifting from New Siberian Islands across the North Pole, they were finally freed between Greenland and Svalbard by icebreaker Joseph Stalin in 1940. | Icebreaker Sedov |
| Baer | Karl Ernst von Baer* (1792–1876) naturalist, a founder of embryology | In 1830–40 Baer researched Arctic meteorology. He was interested in the northern part of Russia and explored Novaya Zemlya in 1837 collecting specimens. Other travels led him to the Caspian Sea, Lapland, and North Cape, Norway. After his explorations of the Volga River he formulated the geological Baer's law, stating that in the Northern Hemisphere erosion occurs mostly on the right banks of rivers, and in the Southern Hemisphere on the left banks. Baer was one of the founders of the Russian Geographical Society in 1845, and also a co-founder and the first President of the Russian Entomological Society. | Library of the Russian Geographical Society in 1916 |
| Baidukov | Georgiy Baidukov‡ (1904–1994) military and test pilot, Hero of the Soviet Union (Baidukov, Chkalov and Belyakov in 1937) | Baidukov was involved in a number of Soviet ultralong flights. In 1936 Valery Chkalov, Baidukov and A.V.Belyakov on ANT-25 flew 9,374 km from Moscow through the North Pole to follow-up Chkalov Island in Okhotsk Sea, which took 56 h 20 min. In 1937, also on ANT-25, the same crew flew 8,504 km from Moscow through the North Pole to Vancouver, Washington, which was the first transpolar flight between Europe and North America by airplane, rather than dirigible. Named in honor: Baydukov Island. | Chkalov and Baydukov Islands |
| Baranov | Alexander Baranov^ (1746–1819) merchant, colonial administrator | Baranov was hired to head the Shelikhov-Golikov Company, which in 1799 was transformed into the Russian-American Company. Thus Baranov became the first governor of Russian America and held this post in 1799–1818. He explored the coast areas of northwestern North America, helped Russian Orthodox missionaries and improved relations with Alaska natives. He established trade with China, Hawaii and also with California, where he founded Fort Ross. Named in honor: Baranof Island. | Fort Ross in California |
| Begichev | Nikifor Begichev‡ (1874–1927); Russian Navy officer (forensic facial reconstruction) | Begichev was the bosun of the ship Zarya, carrying Eduard Toll's expedition in 1900–03. In 1922, at the request of Norway, Begichev led a Soviet expedition in search of the lost crew members of Roald Amundsen's 1918 expedition on the ship Maud, Peter Tessem and Paul Knutsen, but was unsuccessful (remains were later found by Georgy Rybin). In 1923–24 Begichev explored the Taymyr Peninsula with Nikolay Urvantsev. Named in honor: Bolshoy Begichev Island, Maliy Begichev Island. | Begichev Islands location |
| Beketov | Pyotr Beketov* (c. 1600–c. 1661); Siberian Cossack voevoda (a monument in Chita, Zabaykalsky Krai) | Beketov, initially a strelets, was appointed Enisei voevoda in Siberia after 1627. He successfully carried out the voyage to collect taxes from Zabaykalye Buryats, becoming the first Russian to set foot in Buryatia. He founded the first Russian settlement there, Rybinsky ostrog. Beketov was sent to the Lena River in 1631, where in 1632 he founded Yakutsk, a startpoint of further Russian expeditions eastward, southward and northward. He sent his Cossacks to explore the Aldan and Kolyma rivers, to found new fortresses, and to collect taxes. In 1652 he launched another voyage to Buryatia, and in 1653 Beketov's Cossacks founded follow-up Chita and then future Nerchinsk in 1654. | A tower of Yakutsky ostrog. |
| Bekovich-Cherkassky | Alexander Bekovich-Cherkassky! (?–1717); Russian Army officer | Bekovich-Cherkassky, a Circassian Muslim converted to Christianity, was made by Tsar Peter the Great the leader of the first Russian military expeditions into Central Asia in 1714–17, with the aim of conquering the Khanate of Khiva and the golden sands of the Oxus River. Bekovich received these orders in Astrakhan, where he was engaged in preparing the first Russian map of the Caspian Sea. He commanded a preliminary expedition to Turkmenistan and set up the forts in Krasnovodsk and Alexandrovsk. In 1717 he won the battle against Khivan Khan, but was tricked into separating his men, betrayed by the Khan, defeated and killed. | The Caucasus, Caspian Sea and Turkmenistan |
| Bellingshausen | Fabian Gottlieb von Bellingshausen§ (1778–1852); Russian admiral, circumnavigator, cartographer | Bellingshausen took part in the first Russian circumnavigation under Ivan Krusenstern on Nadezhda in 1803–06. He himself led another Russian circumnavigation in 1819–21 on the sloop Vostok, together with Mikhail Lazarev on Mirny – this expedition was the first to discover the continent of Antarctica on January 28, 1820 (New Style). They also discovered and named Peter I Island, Zavodovski, Leskov and Visokoi Islands, Antarctic peninsula mainland and Alexander Island (Alexander Coast), and made discoveries in the tropical waters of the Pacific, including Vostok Island. Named in honor: Bellingshausen Island (Atlantic), Bellingshausen Sea, Bellingshausen Station, Bellinshausen Island (Pacific), Faddey Islands, Bellingshausen Plate, Bellinsgauzen crater (Moon), 3659 Bellingshausen (minor planet). | Vostok and Mirny in Antarctica |
| Berg | Lev Berg! (1876–1950) geographer, biologist | Berg studied and determined the depth of the lakes of Central Asia, including Balkhash Lake and Issyk Kul. He researched the ichthyology of Central Asia and European Russia. He developed Dokuchaev's doctrine of biomes and climatology and was one of the founders of the Geographical Institute, now the Faculty of Geography of the Saint Petersburg University. In 1940–50 Berg was the President of the Soviet Geographical Society. | Balkhash Lake |
| Bering | Vitus Bering^ (1681–1741); Russian Navy captain-commander | Returning from the East Indies, Bering joined the Russian Navy in 1703. He became the main organiser of the Great Northern Expedition to explore northern Asia. In 1725, Bering went overland to Okhotsk, crossed to Kamchatka, and aboard Sv. Gavriil mapped some 3500 km of the Bering Sea coast and passed the Bering Strait in 1728–29. Later, Ivan Fyodorov and Mikhail Gvozdev aboard the same Sv. Gavriil sighted the Alaskan shore in 1732. Having organised a major Second Kamchatka expedition, Bering and Aleksei Chirikov sailed from Okhotsk in 1740 aboard Sv. Piotr and Sv. Pavel, founded Petropavlovsk-Kamchatsky, and headed together to North America in 1741, until separated by storm. Bering discovered the southern coast of Alaska, landed near Kayak Island and discovered the Aleutian Islands. Chirikov discovered the shores of America near Aleksander Archipelago and safely returned to Asia. Bering, however, became very ill and his ship was driven to an uninhabited follow-up Bering Island of the Commander group. Bering died there, along with part of his crew. The rest built a vessel out of the wreckage of Sv. Piotr and escaped to Petropavlovsk. Named in honor: Bering Strait, Bering Sea, Bering Island, Bering Glacier, Bering Land Bridge, Beringia. | A plaque in Danish Vitus Bering Park with Bering's voyages etched A postage stamp depicting the discovery of the Commander Islands and Alaska. |
| Bilibin | Yuri Bilibin‡ (1901–1952) geologist | Bilibin led the First Kolyma Expedition in 1928 and in 1931–1932 he organized the Second Kolyma Expedition. The result of the explorations was the discovery of gold deposits in Northeast Siberia. In 1934, together with mining engineer Evgeny Bobin (1897–1941), Bilibin surveyed and charted the last unmapped areas of the continental USSR, the Yudoma-Maya and the Aldan highlands, as well as the Sette-Daban, in the course of an expedition sent by the Soviet government. Named in honor: Bilibino Town, Bilibino District, Bilibinskite. | Monument located in Bilibino |
| | Joseph Billings^ (c. 1758–1806); Royal Navy and Russian Navy officer | In 1785–95 Billings, previously an English officer who had sailed with Captain Cook, led a Russian expedition in search of the Northeast Passage, with Gavril Sarychev as his deputy. They made accurate maps of the Chukchi Peninsula, the west coast of Alaska, and the Aleutian Islands. They landed on Kodiak Island, examined the area of Prince William Sound and compiled a census of the native population of the Aleutians. Billings crossed Chukotka on reindeer and made the first elaborate description of the Chukchi people. Named in honor: Cape Billings, Billings (Chukotka). | Location of Cape Billings in Chukotka |
| Brusilov | Georgy Brusilov^ (1884–1914?); Russian Navy captain | In 1910–11, Brusilov took part in a hydrographic expedition on the icebreakers Taymyr and Vaygach to the Chukchi and East Siberian Seas. In 1912–14 he led an expedition on the brig St.Anna, which aimed to travel by the Northern Sea Route from the Atlantic to the Pacific. St.Anna became icebound west of Yamal Peninsula and drifted to the North Pole in 1913. Brusilov became ill and many of the crew succumbed to scurvy. In 1914 a group led by lieutenant Valerian Albanov abandoned the ship and walked south over the drifting ice. Only Albanov and Alexander Konrad managed to reach Franz Joseph Land, where they were rescued by Georgy Sedov's St. Foka. The efforts to find the St. Anna were unsuccessful. Brusilov and his ship are among the prototypes for the novel The Two Captains by Veniamin Kaverin, where the fictional St. Maria repeats the drift of St. Anna. | Kara Sea |
| Bulatovich | Alexander Bulatovich† (1870–1919); Russian Army officer, writer, hieromonk (tonsured Father Antony), imiaslavie leader, hero of World War I | In 1897 Bulatovich was a member of the Russian mission of the Red Cross in Africa, where he became a confidant of Negus Menelek II of Ethiopia and his military aide in the war with Italy and the southern tribes. He became the first European to provide a description of the Kaffa province (conquered by Menelek II with Bulatovich's help) and among the first to reach the mouth of the Omo River. Among the places named by Bulatovich was the Nicholas II Mountain range. The prototype for grotesque Schema-Hussar Alexei Bulanovich in Ilf and Petrov's The Twelve Chairs; the hero of Valentin Pikul's The Hussar on a Camel and Richard Seltzer's The Name of Hero. | Ethiopia |
| Bulatovich | Fabian Bellingshausen† (1778–1852); Russian officer of Baltic German descent in the Imperial Russian Navy, cartographer and explorer | The discoverer of the Antarctica. In 1819 the authorities selected Bellingshausen to lead the First Russian Antarctic Expedition which was intended to explore the Southern Ocean and to find land in the proximity of the South Pole. With two ships, sloop-of-war Vostok ("East") and support vessel Mirny ("Peaceful") were led by Mikhail Lazarev, the journey started from Kronstadt on 4 June 1819. Bellingshausen and Lazarev managed to twice circumnavigate the continent. Thus they disproved Captain Cook's assertion that it was impossible to find land in the southern ice fields. The expedition also made discoveries and observations in the tropical waters of the Pacific Ocean. | First Russian Antarctic Expedition 1819-1821 |

=== C ===
| Portrait | Person | Achievements | Image |
|---|---|---|---|
| | Semion Chelyuskin‡ (c. 1700–1764); Russian Navy officer (Malygin, D. Ovtsyn, Chelyuskin, Kh. Laptev and D. Laptev on a commemorative coin) | Chelyuskin participated in the Great Northern Expedition in 1733–43. He traveled in the groups led by Vasily Pronchischev and Khariton Laptev. In 1741 he led his own voyage from the Khatanga River to the Pyasina River by land. He explored and described the western coastline of Taimyr Peninsula and the mouths of Pyasina and Yenisei Rivers. In 1741–42, he traveled from Turukhansk to the mouth of the Khatanga and described the northern coastline of Taimyr from Cape Faddey in the east to the mouth of the Taimyra River in the west. Chelyuskin discovered the northern extremity of Asia, Cape Chelyuskin. Named in honor: Cape Chelyuskin, Chelyuskin Peninsula, Chelyuskin Island, Chelyuskin steamship. | Cape Chelyuskin, the northernmost point of Eurasia |
| Chersky | Ivan Chersky* (1845–1892) paleontologist, geologist, geographer | Exiled to Transbaikalia for participation in the January Uprising and pardoned only in 1883, Chersky became a self-taught scientist in Siberia. He traveled to the Sayan Mountains, the Irkut River Valley and Lower Tunguska. During four expeditions in 1877–81 Chersky explored Selenga river. He explained the origin of Lake Baikal, made the first geological map of its coast and described the geological structure of East Siberia. He analysed the tectonics of Inner Asia and pioneered the geomorphological evolution theory. He collected over 2,500 ancient bones. In 1892 he explored the Kolyma, Yana and Indigirka Rivers and died from illness there. Named in honor: Chersky Range, Chersky (settlement). | Selenga watershed |
| Chichagov | Vasili Chichagov‡ (1726–1809); Russian admiral, victorious commander-in-chief of the Baltic Fleet in the Russo-Swedish War (1788–1790) | In 1764–66 Chichagov led two expeditions to find the Northeast Passage between the Atlantic and the Pacific along the northern coast of Siberia, a project of Mikhail Lomonosov. Although he sailed past Svalbard, reached 80°26'N in 1765 and 80°30'N in 1766, and conducted valuable research, both expeditions failed to find the route. Named in honor: Chichagof Island. | Barents and Baltic Seas, where Chichagov explored and fought |
| Chikhachyov | Pyotr Chikhachyov! (1808–1890) naturalist, geologist | In 1842 Chikhachyov led an expedition to the unknown territories of the Altai and Sayan Mountains. He discovered Kuznetsk Coal Basin, reached the sources of the rivers Abakan, Chu and Chulyshman, and entered Tuva. In 1845 he published works on the geology of Altai Mountains and Xinjiang. In 1848–63 he led eight expeditions in Asia Minor, Armenia, Kurdistan and East Thrace. In 1853–69 he conducted a major study of Asia Minor, while being the attaché of the Russian embassy in Constantinople. In 1878, at the age of 71, he visited Algeria and Tunis. He published many works in geography, natural history and the politics of the Eastern Question. | Mountains of Central Asia Asia Minor |
| Chilingarov | Artur Chilingarov‡ (born 1939) polar scientist, Hero of the Soviet Union, Hero of Russia, politician | In 1969 Chilingarov became the head of the research station "North Pole-19" and in 1971 the head of Bellingshausen Station during the 17-th Soviet Antarctic Expedition. In 1985 he successfully led the mission to rescue the research vessel Mikhail Somov, which had been ice-blocked in the Southern Ocean. During the Russian Arktika 2007 expedition, Chilingarov, accompanied by other explorers from different countries, descended to the seabed 13,980 feet below the North Pole in order to plant the Russian flag there and gather specimens of the bottom ground, using MIR submersibles. In 2008 he took part in the expedition which descended one mile to the bottom of Lake Baikal on MIRs. | MIR submersible |
| Chirikov | Aleksei Chirikov^ (1703–1748); Russian Navy captain | In 1725–30 and in 1733–43, Chirikov was Vitus Bering's deputy during the 1st and the 2nd Kamchatka expeditions. On July 15, 1741, Chirikov, the captain of Sv. Pavel, became the first European to land on the northwestern coast of North America near Alexander Archipelago. Thereafter he discovered some of the Aleutian Islands. In 1742 Chirikov specified the location of the Attu Island during the search for Bering's lost ship. In 1746 Chirikov took part in creating the final map of the Russian discoveries in the northern Pacific Ocean. Named in honor: Chirikof Island. | Alexander Archipelago |
| Chkalov | Valery Chkalov‡ (1904–1938) military and test pilot, Hero of the Soviet Union | Chkalov developed several new figures of aerobatics. He was involved in a number of Soviet ultralong flights. In 1936 Chkalov, Georgiy Baidukov and A.V.Belyakov on ANT-25 flew 9,374 km from Moscow through the North Pole to follow-up Chkalov Island in the Okhotsk Sea, which took 56 h 20 min. In 1937, also on ANT-25, the same crew flew 8,504 km from Moscow through the North Pole to Vancouver, Washington, which was the first transpolar flight between Europe and North America on airplane, rather than on dirigible. Named in honor: Chkalovsk; Chkalov Island, Chkalovskaya (Moscow Metro), Chkalovskaya (Saint Petersburg Metro). | ANT-25 |

=== D ===
| Portrait | Person | Achievements | Image |
|---|---|---|---|
| Dezhnyov | Semyon Dezhnyov^ (c. 1605–1672); Siberian Cossack leader | In 1643 Dezhnyov and Mikhail Stadukhin discovered the Kolyma River and founded Srednekolymsk. Fedot Alekseyev Popov organized a further expedition eastward, and Dezhnyov became a captain of one koch. In 1648 they sailed from Srednekolymsk down to the Arctic and after some time they rounded a 'great rocky projection', thus becoming the first to pass through the Bering Strait and to discover Chukchi Peninsula and the Bering Sea. All their kochi and most of their men (including Popov himself) were lost in storms and clashes with the natives. A small group led by Dezhnyov reached the mouth of the Anadyr River and sailed up it in 1649, having built new boats out of the wreckage. They founded Anadyrsk and were stranded there, until Stadukhin found them, coming from Kolyma by land. Named in honor: Cape Dezhnyov (the easternmost cape of Eurasia). | Bering Strait and the Anadyr River |
| Dokuchaev | Vasily Dokuchaev~ (1846–1903) geographer, geologist, pedologist | Dokuchaev led numerous expeditions to study the soils and geology of European Russia. As a result of his long research of Russian soils, he founded modern soil science, developed the conception of biomes and proposed ways to improve soil productivity. Named in honor: Dokuchaevsk. | Global soil regions |

=== E ===
| Portrait | Person | Achievements | Image |
|---|---|---|---|
| Etholén | Arvid Adolf Etholén^ (1799–1876); Russian Navy officer, colonial administrator | Etolin sailed to Alaska with Vasily Golovnin on Kamchatka and entered the service of the Russian-American Company. He was part of a group that surveyed the Aleutian Islands in 1822–24. In 1833 he explored the Gulf of Alaska. Etolin was the governor of Russian America in 1840–45, and continued to explore Alaska and the Bering Sea. Named in honor: Etolin Island, Etolin Strait. | Aleutian Islands |
| Eversmann | Eduard Eversmann! (1794–1860) naturalist | In 1820 Eversmann traveled to Bukhara disguised as a merchant and in 1825 traveled with a military expedition to Khiva. In 1828 he became a professor of zoology and botany at the University of Kazan. He wrote numerous publications and pioneered the research of the flora and fauna of the southeast steppes of Russia between the Volga and the Urals. Named in honor: Eversmann's redstart, Eversmann's parnassian, Eversmann's rustic and other species. | Walls of Itchan Kala in Khiva |

=== F ===
| Portrait | Person | Achievements | Image |
|---|---|---|---|
| Fedchenko | Alexei Fedchenko! (1844–1873) naturalist | In 1868 Fedchenko traveled through Turkestan, including Samarkand, Panjkent and the upper Zarafshan River valley. In 1870 he explored the Fan Mountains south of the Zarafshan. In 1871 he reached the Alay Valley at Daroot-Korgan and explored the northern Pamir Mountains but was unable to penetrate southward. He perished on Mont Blanc while engaged in an exploring tour in France. Named in honor: Fedchenko Glacier, 3195 Fedchenko (asteroid). | Pamir Mountains in Central Asia |
| Fersman | Alexander Fersman~ (1883–1945) geologist, geochemist | Fersman founded geochemistry, the science of the chemical composition of the Earth. He led numerous expeditions in Crimea, Kola Peninsula and the Urals. He discovered copper and nickel in Monchegorsk, apatite reserves in Khibiny and sulfur in Central Asia. Named in honor: Fersman Mineralogical Museum, Fersman crater (Moon). | Khibiny Mountains |
| | Ivan Fyodorov^ (?–1733); Russian Navy officer | Fyodorov, took part in the first Kamchatka expedition of Vitus Bering in 1725–30. In 1732 Fyodorov and geodesist Mikhail Gvozdev aboard the Sviatoi Gavriil (Bering's ship) sailed to Cape Dezhnyov, the easternmost point of Asia. From there they sailed east and soon discovered the Alaskan mainland near the Cape Prince of Wales, the westernmost point of North America. They charted the north-western coast of Alaska. By doing this, Fyodorov and Gvozdev completed the discovery of the Bering Strait, started by Semyon Dezhnyov and Fedot Popov and continued by Bering. Their expedition also discovered three previously unknown islands. | Seward Peninsula on Alaska, where the Cape Prince of Wales is located |
| Furuhjelm | Johan Hampus Furuhjelm^ (1821–1909); Russian admiral, governor of the Russian Far East, Taganrog and Russian America (in photo with his wife Anna) | In 1850 Furuhjelm became a commander of Novoarkhangelsk port (now Sitka, Alaska) and in 1854 of Ayan port. In 1858–64 he was the governor of Russian America. He improved relations with natives, once using the Columbus-like trick of an eclipse of the moon to impress the Indians. In 1865–72 Furuhjelm served as military governor of Primorsky Krai and chief of Russian seaports on the Pacific, where he contributed significantly to the development and exploration of the whole region. Named in honor: Mount Furuhelm, Furugelm Island. | Russian America |

=== G ===
| Portrait | Person | Achievements | Image |
|---|---|---|---|
| Gagarin | Yury Gagarin (1934–1968); Soviet Air Force pilot, cosmonaut, Hero of the Soviet Union | On 12 April 1961, Gagarin became the first human to travel into space, launching into orbit aboard the Vostok 3KA-3 (Vostok 1). Named in honor: Gagarin (Russia), Gagarin (Armenia), Gagarinsky (inhabited locality), Gagarinsky District, Gagarinskaya metro station, Gagarin crater (Moon), asteroid 1772 Gagarin, Kosmonavt Yuri Gagarin (ship), Gagarin's Start, Gagarin Cosmonaut Training Center, Gagarin Air Force Academy, Gagarin Cup; Cosmonautics Day aka Yuri's Night is a yearly celebration of Gagarin's flight on 12 April. | |
| | Yakov Gakkel‡ (1901–1965) oceanographer | Gakkel was a director of the geography department of the Arctic and Antarctic Research Institute. He participated in numerous Arctic expeditions, including the ones on the icebreaker Sibiryakov in 1932 and on Chelyuskin in 1934. He was the first to create a bathymetric map of the Arctic Ocean. Named in honor: Gakkel Ridge. | Bathymetric map of the Arctic with Gakkel Ridge on it |
| | Matvei Gedenschtrom‡ (1780–1845) public servant, scientist | Gedenschtrom was sent to serve in Siberia for his connection with a smuggling affair at Tallinn customs. In 1809–10 together with Yakov Sannikov he led the cartographic expedition to the Arctic shores of Yakutia. They explored and named the New Siberian Islands (earlier discovered by Yakov Permyakov). This expedition established a theory about the existence of the legendary Sannikov Land somewhere northwest of Kotelny Island. Gedenschtrom discovered the presence of Siberian polynya (patches of open water at the edge of the drifting ice and continental fast ice). He charted the coastline between the Yana and Kolyma Rivers. He made numerous trips across Yakutia and the areas east of Lake Baikal. | New Siberian Islands |
| Georgi | Johann Gottlieb Georgi* (1729–1802) geographer, naturalist, ethnographer, physician, chemist | Georgi accompanied both Johan Peter Falk and Peter Simon Pallas on their respective journeys through European Russia and Siberia. In 1772 he mapped Lake Baikal and was the first to describe omul fish, as well as other fauna and flora of the Baikal region. He amassed a large collection of minerals and in 1776–80 published the first comprehensive work on the ethnography of the indigenous peoples of Russia. Named in honor: Georgia flower. | Omul in an aquarium in the Baikal-Museum in Listvyanka |
| Gmelin | Johann Georg Gmelin* (1709–1755) naturalist, botanist, geographer | In 1733–43 Gmelin participated in the Great Northern Expedition and made a number of journeys through Siberia, covering more than 34,000 km in total. He discovered that the Caspian Sea lies below sea level. He published two major works about his travels in Russia and the flora of Siberia, and described more than 500 previously unknown plants. Named in honor: Gmelina and Larix gmelinii plant genera. | Gmelina arborea |
| Golovnin | Vasily Golovnin^ (1776–1831); Russian admiral, circumnavigator | Golovnin made two circumnavigations on the sloop Diana (1807–09) and the frigate Kamchatka (1817–19). In 1811 he described and mapped part of the Kuril Islands. At that time he was taken prisoner for two years by the Japanese. He described his years in captivity, life in Japan, and his voyages around the world in books. Later he was the general quartermaster of the Russian Navy and supervised the building of the first Russian steamships. He tutored Fyodor Litke, Ferdinand Wrangel and other seafarers. Named in honor: Golovin, Alaska. | Golovnin's circumnavigations |
| Gromchevsky | Bronislav Gromchevsky! (1855–1926); Russian Army officer | Gromchevsky participated in the Russian conquest of Central Asia and led reconnaissance expeditions in the surrounding regions. In 1885–86 he explored Kashgar and Tian Shan. In 1888–89 he explored the Pamirs, Kafiristan, Kashmir and northwestern Tibet and went as far as British India. He is regarded as the Russian counterpart to the British military-explorer Francis Younghusband. The two Great Game rivals famously met in 1889 when they were exploring the Hunza Valley. In 1900 Gromchevsky explored North Eastern China. | Kashmir region |
| Grigory Grum-Grshimailo | Grigory Grum-Grshimailo! (1860–1936) zoologist, entomologist, ethnographer, geographer | In 1884 Grum-Grshimailo started his first Pamir expedition on which he explored the Alai Mountains and reached as far as Lake Karakul. In 1885–87 he traveled extensively through Central Asia, reaching the Silk Road, Lake Chatyr-Kul and Kashgar. In 1889–90 he discovered the Ayding Lake, the second lowest land point on Earth, at 130 m below sea level. He obtained two Przewalski's horses, over 1000 bird specimens and tens of thousands of insects during his 8600 km long travels. In 1903 he explored Mongolia and Tuva and later traveled in the Far East. | Stele at the Ayding Lake |
| | Mikhail Gvozdev^ (1700/04–after 1759) military geodesist | Gvozdev took part in the 1st Kamchatka expedition of Vitus Bering. In 1732 together with Ivan Fedorov aboard Sviatoi Gavriil (Bering's ship) they reached Dezhnev Cape (the easternmost point of Asia), sailed east and soon discovered the Alaskan mainland near the Cape Prince of Wales (the westernmost point of North America). They charted that part of the Alaskan coast and discovered three new islands. Thus they completed the discovery of the Bering Strait, once started by Semyon Dezhnyov and Fedot Popov and continued by Bering. Subsequently, in 1741–42 Gvozdev participated in the Great Northern Expedition and mapped most of the western and southern shores of the Okhotsk Sea, and the eastern shore of Sakhalin. | Sea of Okhotsk, Kamchatka, Alaska in the North Pacific |

=== H ===
| Portrait | Person | Achievements | Image |
|---|---|---|---|
| Hagemeister | Ludwig von Hagemeister^ (1780–1833); Russian Navy captain, colonial administrator, circumnavigator | After taking part in the Napoleonic Wars, in 1806–07 Hagemeister journeyed to Alaska as captain of the Neva (former ship of Lisyansky). In 1808–09, he explored the shores of Alaska and the waters of the North Pacific. In 1812–15 he supervised the building of the first tall ships to sail on Lake Baikal. In 1816–19 he made a circumnavigation on Kutuzov, with a stop in Alaska, where he was a governor of Russian America in 1818–19. In 1828–29, Hagemeister made his second circumnavigation aboard Krotky. Among other islands, he surveyed the Menshikov Atoll (Kwajalein) in the Marshall Islands group. Named in honor: Hagemeister Island. | Hagemeister's circumnavigations |

=== I ===
| Portrait | Person | Achievements | Image |
|---|---|---|---|
| | Kurbat Ivanov* (?–1666); Siberian Cossack voevoda | In 1642, on the basis of explorations made by Ivan Moskvitin, Ivanov made the earliest known map of the Russian Far East. In 1643 with a group of Cossacks he sailed up the Lena River from Verkholensky ostrog, having decided to check the rumors of a large body of water to the south. They crossed the Baikal Mountains by foot, descended down the Sarma River, discovered Lake Baikal and visited its Olkhon Island. Ivanov made the first chart and description of Baikal. In 1659–65 Ivanov was the next head of Anadyrsky ostrog after Semyon Dezhnyov. In 1660 he sailed from Anadyr Bay to Cape Dezhnyov. He is credited with the creation of the early map of Chukotka and the Bering Strait, which was the first to show on paper (schematically) the yet undiscovered Wrangel Island, both Diomede Islands and Alaska. | Lena River and Lake Baikal |
| | Gerasim Izmailov^ (c. 1745–after 1795); Russian Navy officer | In 1771 Izmailov was caught up in the Benevsky mutiny while serving on Kamchatka. After an attempt to break away from the mutineers he was marooned on Simushir, an uninhabited isle in the Kurils. For a year he lived like Robinson Crusoe before being rescued, tried on charges of mutiny and cleared. From 1775 he created the first detailed map of the Aleutian Islands. In 1778 he met with Captain James Cook in Unalaska. In 1783–85 Izmaylov and Grigory Shelikhov founded the first permanent Russian settlement in North America on Kodiak Island. In 1789 Izmaylov became the first to explore and map the Kenai Peninsula. Later he helped Alexander Andreyevich Baranov to fight off the Tlingit natives and saved the lost crew of a Russian ship from Saint Paul Island, Alaska. | Aleutian Islands |

=== J ===
| Portrait | Person | Achievements | Image |
|---|---|---|---|
| Junker | Wilhelm Junker† (1840–1892) physician, ethnographer | Born into the rich family of a Moscow banker, Junker traveled a lot. He carried out a major exploration of Eastern and Equatorial Africa in 1875–86, with Khartoum and then Lado as bases for his expeditions. He researched African peoples, including the Zande people from Niam-Niam, and collected plant and animal specimens. He explored the Congo-Nile Divide, where he established the identity of the Uele and Ubangi rivers. The Mahdist uprising prevented his return to Europe through the Sudan, and in 1884–86 he went south, traveled through Uganda and Tabora, reached Zanzibar and finally returned to St. Petersburg. | Congo River basin |

=== K ===
| Portrait | Person | Achievements | Image |
|---|---|---|---|
| Kalvitsa | Otto Kalvitsa‡ (1888–1930) aviator, polar explorer | Finnish-born aviator who is one of the pioneers of the Soviet Arctic aviation. He explored the waters of Matochkin Strait between the Severny and Yuzhny Islands of Novaya Zemlya in order to survey ship routes for the Northeast passage. Kalvitsa also participated Georgy Ushakov's expedition to the Wrangel Island. Named in honor: Kalvitsa. | Location of the Matochkin Strait |
| Khabarov monument | Yerofey Khabarov* (1603–after 1671); Siberian Cossack leader | A manager for the merchants Stroganovs, Khabarov went to Siberia and in 1641 founded saltworks on the Lena River. In 1649–50 he became the second Russian to explore the Amur river (after Vassili Poyarkov). Through the Olyokma, Tungur and Shilka Rivers he reached Amur (Dauria), returned to Yakutsk and then back to Amur with a larger force, where he engaged in the Russian-Manchu border conflicts. He built winter quarters at Albazin, then sailed down the Amur and found Achansk, which preceded the present-day Khabarovsk, defeating or evading large armies of Daurian Manchu Chinese and Koreans on his way. He charted the Amur in his Draft of the Amur river. Named in honor: Khabarovsk. | Amur River basin |
| Klenova | Maria Klenova§ (1898–1976) marine geologist | Klenova was one of the founders of marine geology. She began her career in 1925 aboard the Soviet research vessel Persey in the Barents Sea, visiting Novaya Zemlya, Spitsbergen and Franz Josef Land. In 1933 Klenova made the first complete seabed map of the Barents Sea. Her later work included the research of seabed geology in the Atlantic and the Antarctic, and in the Caspian and White Seas. She was one of the earliest women explorers of the Antarctic. | Barents Sea as seen from space |
| Kolchak | Aleksandr Kolchak^ (1874–1920); Russian admiral, hero of the Russo-Japanese War, World War I, Russian Civil War, one of the leaders of the White movement | Kolchak joined the expedition of Eduard Toll on the ship Zarya in 1900 as a hydrologist. He took part in two further Arctic expeditions and explored the shores of Taymyr Peninsula. He was nicknamed "Kolchak the Polar". He published a number of important works on Arctic ice. Named in honor: Kolchak Island. | Kolchak Island in the Kara Sea |
| Kolomeitsev | Nikolai Kolomeitsev^ (1867–1944); Russian admiral, hero of the Russo-Japanese War | After several expeditions in the Arctic, Kolomeitsev became a commander of Eduard Toll's ship Zarya during the Russian Polar Expedition in 1900. They aimed to explore the area north of the New Siberian Islands and to find Sannikov Land. There was a disagreement between Kolomeitsev and Toll over the treatment of the crew, and finally Fyodor Matisen was made captain, while Kolomeitsev was sent with Stepan Rastorguyev to organize coal depots and carry the post to the mainland. They made a number of discoveries on the 800 km long sledge trip over Taymyr Peninsula. Named in honor: Kolomeitsev Islands. | Polar ship Zarya |
| Konyukhov | Fyodor Konyukhov§ (born 1951) yacht captain, traveler, painter, writer, Orthodox priest | Konyukhov made more than 40 unique trips and climbs expressing his vision of the world in more than 3000 paintings and 9 books. He set a record for crossing the Atlantic on a single row-boat in 46 days. He also crossed 800 km in a record 15 days and 22 hours during a Trans-Greenland dog sleigh ride. He was the first Russian to complete the Three Poles Challenge and Explorers Grand Slam. He is the first and so far the only person in the world to have reached the five extreme Poles of the planet: North Pole (3 times), South Pole, the Pole of inaccessibility in the Arctic Ocean, Mount Everest (Alpinists pole) and Cape Horn (Yachtsmen pole). He set a record for the solo yacht circumnavigation of Antarctica in 2008 (102 days). | The Seven Summits on an elevation world map |
| | Nikolai Korzhenevskiy! (1879–1958); Russian Army officer, geographer, glaciologist | In 1903–28 Korzhenevskiy organized 11 expeditions to explore the Pamir Mountains. He discovered a number of glaciers and the highest peaks in the Pamirs, including Peak Korzhenevskaya which he named after his wife Evgeniya. He discovered and named Academy of Sciences Range (in honor of the Academy of Sciences of the USSR) and made a catalogue of all the glaciers in Central Asia, having discovered 70 of them himself. | Peak Korzhenevskaya |
| Kotzebue | Otto von Kotzebue^ (1787–1846); Russian Navy captain, circumnavigator | Kotzebue accompanied Ivan Krusenstern on the first Russian circumnavigation in 1803–06. On the brig Rurik he led another Russian circumnavigation in 1815–18. He discovered the Romanzov Islands, Rurik Islands and Krusenstern Islands in the Pacific, then moved towards Alaska and discovered and named Kotzebue Sound and Cape Krusenstern. Returning south he discovered the New Year Island. In 1823–26 he made another world cruise on the sloop "Enterprise" making more discoveries. Named in honor: Kotzebue Sound, Kotzebue, Alaska. | Kotzebue's circumnavigations |
| Kozlov | Pyotr Kozlov! (1863–1935); Russian Army officer | Kozlov started traveling in Central Asia with Nikolai Przhevalsky, and after the death of his mentor he continued his work. From 1899 to 1901 he explored the upper reaches of the Yellow River, Yangtze, and Mekong rivers. He rivaled Sven Hedin and Aurel Stein as the foremost researcher of Xinjiang at the historical peak of the Great Game. In 1907 he visited the Dalai Lama in Urga. In 1907–09, Kozlov explored the Gobi Desert and discovered the remains of the ancient Tangut city of Khara-Khoto. He excavated the site and uncovered no less than 2,000 books in the Tangut language. In 1923–26 he explored Mongolia and Tibet and discovered an unprecedented number of Xiongnu royal burials at Noin-Ula. | A silk painting from Khara-Khoto |
| Krasheninnikov | Stepan Krasheninnikov* (1711–1755) naturalist, geographer | Krashennikov was a classmate of Mikhail Lomonosov. Krashennikov traveled in Siberia in 1733–36 and then on Kamchatka Peninsula in 1737–41, during the Second Kamchatka Expedition. He gave the first full description of Kamchatka in his book An Account of the Land of Kamchatka, with detailed reports of the plants and animals of the region, and also the language and culture of the indigenous Itelmen and Koryaks. Named in honor: Krascheninnikovia and other species. | Fire-breathing mountain on Kamchatka from Krasheninnikov's book |
| | Pyotr Krenitsyn^ (1728–1770); Russian Navy captain | In 1766–70 Krenitsyn led the "secret" expedition to the North Pacific together with Mikhail Levashov, as ordered by Catherine the Great. They explored the Aleutian Islands and part of the Alaskan shore, discovering good haven in Unalaska and many features of the Alaskan coast. Krenitsyn died by drowning in the Kamchatka River. On the basis of his explorations the first general map of the Aleutian Islands was created. Named in honor: Krenitzin Islands. | Alaska and the Aleutian Islands |
| Krikalev | Sergei Krikalyov$ (born 1958) cosmonaut and mechanical engineer, Hero of the Soviet Union, Hero of Russia | Krikalyov spent a record 803 days 9 hours and 39 minutes in space during his six spaceflights. As a Soviet cosmonaut he traveled into space and back aboard Soyuz TM-7 in 1988 and then launched aboard Soyuz TM-12 in 1991, both times working on the Soviet space station Mir. "The last Citizen of the USSR", Krikalev landed back on Earth aboard Soyuz TM-13 in 1992 to turn into a Russian cosmonaut. He became the first Russian to travel on an American Space Shuttle during the STS-60 mission to Mir in 1994, and then he made another Shuttle flight STS-88, which was the first Shuttle mission to the International Space Station. He again traveled to ISS on Soyuz TM-31 in 2000 and returned on STS-102 in 2001. Again he traveled to ISS and back on Soyuz TMA-6 in 2005. | Mir space station. |
| Kropotkin | Pyotr Kropotkin* (1842–1921); Russian Army officer, geographer, zoologist, anarchist revolutionary | While serving in Siberia, in 1864 Kropotkin led a survey expedition crossing North Manchuria from Transbaikalia to the Amur River. Subsequently, he took part in the expedition which proceeded up the Sungari River into central Manchuria, yielding valuable geographic results. In 1871 he explored the glacial deposits of Finland and Sweden. He published several important works on the geography of Asia. Named in honor: Kropotkin, Krasnodar Krai, Kropotkinskaya (Moscow Metro). | Manchuria, 1892 |
| Krusenstern | Adam Johann von Krusenstern^ (1770–1846); Russian admiral, circumnavigator, geographer | In 1803–06, under the patronage of Alexander I of Russia and Nikolai Rumyantsev, Krusenstern led the first Russian circumnavigation of the world aboard the Nadezhda together with Yuri Lisianski on Neva. The purpose of the expedition was to establish trade with China and Japan, and examine California for a possible colony. They sailed from Kronshtadt, rounded Cape Horn, and reached the northern Pacific, making a number of discoveries. Krusenstern made an atlas of the Pacific, receiving an honorary membership in the Russian Academy of Sciences for the work. Named in honor: Krusenstern Islands, Cape Krusenstern, Kruzenshtern (ship), Krusenstern (crater). | A coin dedicated to the first Russian circumnavigation |
| Kuchin | Alexander Kuchin‡ (1888–1913?); Russian Navy captain, oceanographer | Kuchin's life was bound with Norway: he started as a seaman on a Norwegian ship, created a Small Russian-Norwegian dictionary, studied oceanography from Bjorn Helland-Hansen, conducted oceanographic studies during Amundsen's South Pole Expedition on the Fram, when he became the first Russian to set foot on the land of Antarctica, and married Aslaug Poulson, a Norwegian. In 1912–13 he was the captain of Vladimir Rusanov's expedition to Svalbard on their ship Hercules. After the successful research of the coal reserves on Svalbard, without consultation with the Russian authorities they made an incredibly rash attempt to pass via the Northern Sea Route, and were lost in the Kara Sea. Relics of the Herkules were found near the Kolosovykh Islands. | Svalbard |

=== L ===
| Portrait | Person | Achievements | Image |
|---|---|---|---|
| Langsdorf | Georg von Langsdorff† (1774–1852) physician, naturalist, consul general of Russia in Rio de Janeiro | Langsdorf participated as a naturalist and physician in the first Russian circumnavigation in 1803–05. Independently, he explored the Aleutians, Sitka and Kodiak Islands in 1805–07. In 1813 he became consul general of Russia in Rio de Janeiro, Brazil. There he explored the flora, fauna and geography of the province of Minas Gerais with French naturalist Augustin Saint-Hilaire in 1813–20. In 1821–22 he led an exploratory and scientific expedition from São Paulo to Pará in the Amazon rainforest via a fluvial route, accompanied by an international team of scientists. In 1826–29 he led a 6000 km long expedition from Porto Feliz to the Amazon River and back emassing huge scientific collections now deposited in Kunstkamera. | Minas Gerais province in Brazil |
| D.Laptev on a commemorative coin | Dmitry Laptev‡ (1701–1771); Russian admiral (Malygin, Ovtsyn, Chelyuskin, Kh.Laptev and D.Laptev on a commemorative coin) | A cousin of Khariton Laptev, Dmitry Laptev led one of the parties of the Great Northern Expedition in 1739–42. He described the sea coastline from the mouth of the Lena River to the Cape Bolshoy Baranov east of the mouth of the Kolyma River, the basin and the mouth of the Anadyr River, and the land route from the Anadyr fortress to the Penzhin Bay. In 1741–42, Laptev surveyed the Bolshoy Anyuy River. Named in honor: Laptev Sea. | Laptev Sea |
| Kh.Laptev on a commemorative coin | Khariton Laptev‡ (1700–1763); Russian Navy officer (Malygin, Ovtsyn, Chelyuskin, Kh.Laptev and D.Laptev on a commemorative coin) | A cousin of Dmitry Laptev, Khariton Laptev led one of the parties of the Great Northern Expedition in 1739–42. Together with Semion Chelyuskin, N. Chekin, and G. Medvedev, Laptev described the Taimyr Peninsula from the mouth of the Khatanga River to the mouth of the Pyasina river and discovered several islands. He participated in the creation of the "General Map of the Siberian and Kamchatka Coast". Named in honor: Laptev Sea. | Taimyr Peninsula |
| A.Laxman | Adam Laxman^ (1766–1806?); Russian Army officer, diplomat | Son of Kirill Laxman, Adam Laxman led a diplomatic mission to Japan in 1791–92, with the aim to return Daikokuya Kōdayū and another Japanese castaway in exchange for trade concessions from Tokugawa shogunate. He made valuable observations, but returned to Russia essentially empty-handed, though he possibly obtained the first official Japanese documents granting very limited permission to trade, to a nation other than China or the Netherlands. | Map of Japan by Daikokuya Kōdayū in Japanese and Russian |
| | Kirill Laxman* (1737–1796) clergyman, naturalist | Kirill Laxman became a priest first in St. Petersburg and then in the Siberian town of Barnaul. In 1764–68 he explored Siberia, reaching Irkutsk, Baikal, Kiakhta and the border with China and researching the Siberian flora and fauna. In 1782 he founded the oldest museum in Siberia in Irkutsk, where he had settled earlier and was a business partner of Alexander Baranov (the future governor of Russian America). Laxman was engaged in attempts to establish relationships between Russia and Japan. He brought Daikokuya Kōdayū, a Japanese castaway, to the court of empress Catherine the Great. | |
| Lazarev | Mikhail Lazarev§ (1788–1851) admiral, circumnavigator, hero of the Battle of Navarino, commander of the Russian Black Sea Fleet, tutor of admirals and war heroes Nakhimov, V. Kornilov and V. Istomin | Lazarev thrice circumnavigated the globe. He led the 1813–16 circumnavigation aboard the vessel Suvorov and discovered Suvorov Atoll. He commanded Mirny, the second ship in the Russian circumnavigation of 1819–1821 under the leadership of Fabian Gottlieb von Bellingshausen aboard Vostok – this expedition was the first to discover the continent of Antarctica on January 28, 1820 (New Style). They also discovered and named Peter I Island, Zavodovski, Leskov and Visokoi Islands, the Antarctic Peninsula mainland and Alexander Island (Alexander Coast), and made some discoveries in the tropical waters of the Pacific. In 1822–25 Lazarev sailed around the globe for the third time on his frigate Kreyser. Named in honor: Lazarev Bay, Lazarev atoll, Lazarevskoye (settlement), Novolazarevskaya Station, Lazarev Mountains, Lazarev Ice Shelf, Lazarev Trough, 3660 Lazarev (minor planet). | Lazarev's world cruise on Suvorov Antarctica |
| Leonov | Alexei Leonov (1934–2019) cosmonaut and Soviet Air Force general, twice a Hero of the Soviet Union, painter, writer | On March 18, 1965, connected to the spacecraft Voskhod 2 by a 5.35 meter tether, Leonov became the first person to make a spacewalk, or extra-vehicular activity. He was in open space for 12 min 9 sec. At the end of the spacewalk, Leonov's spacesuit had inflated in the vacuum to the point where he could not reenter the airlock. He opened a valve to allow some of the suit's pressure to bleed off, and was barely able to get back inside the capsule, where his companion Pavel Belyayev assisted him. Subsequently, Leonov made a second spaceflight on the Soyuz 19, a part of the Apollo–Soyuz Test Project in 1975. Thus Leonov participated in the first joint flight of the U.S. and Soviet space programs. He published several books and albums of paintings, some of which he created in space. Named in honor: a fictional spaceship in Arthur C. Clarke's book 2010: Odyssey Two, which was dedicated to Leonov. | |
| | Mikhail Levashov^ (c. 1738–1774/76); Russian Navy officer | In 1766–70 Levashov was second-in-command in the "secret" expedition to the North Pacific led by Pyotr Krenitsyn, as ordered by Catherine the Great. They explored the Aleutian Islands and part of the Alaskan shore, discovering good haven in Unalaska and many features of the Alaskan coast. Levashov also explored and described the Commander Islands. On the basis of their explorations the first general map of the Aleutian Islands was created. | |
| Lisyansky | Yuri Lisyansky^ (1773–1837); Russian Navy officer, circumnavigator | In 1803–06 Lisyansky, aboard the Neva, together with Ivan Krusenstern on the Nadezhda, led the first Russian circumnavigation of the world. The purpose of the expedition was to establish trade with China and Japan and to examine California for a possible colony. The ships split near Hawaii and Lisyanski headed to Russian Alaska, where the Neva became essential in defeating the Tlingit in the Battle of Sitka. Lisyansky was the first to describe the Hawaiian monk seal on the island which now bears his name. He met Krusenstern again in Macau, but they soon separated. Eventually, Lisyansky was the first to return to Kronstadt. Named in honor: Lisianski Island. | Neva in Kodiak Lisianski Island |
| Litke | Friedrich von Lütke^ (1797–1882); Russian admiral, circumnavigator | Litke took part in Vasily Golovnin's world cruise on the ship Kamchatka in 1817–19. In 1821–24, Litke explored the coastline of Novaya Zemlya, the White Sea, and the eastern Barents Sea. In 1826–29, he led the circumnavigation on the ship Senyavin and accompanied Mikhail Staniukovich on the sloop Moller. During this voyage they explored the Bering Sea (including the Pribilof Islands, St. Matthew Island and the Commander Islands), the Bonin Islands off Japan, and the Carolines, discovering 12 new islands. Litke was a co-founder and the president of the Russian Geographic Society in 1845–50 and 1857–72. He was the president of the Russian Academy of Sciences in 1864–82, and occupied a number of major military and state offices. Named in honor: Cape Lutke, Alaska, Litke Strait, Icebreaker Feodor Litke. | Litke's voyage on Senyavin Cape Lutke |
| | Fyodor Luzhin* (?–1727) cartographer, geodesist | In 1719–1721, together with Ivan Yevreinov, Luzhin made the first instrumental mapping of Kamchatka and the first map of the Kuril Islands during the "secret expedition", as ordered by Peter the Great. In 1723–24 he made surveys of different parts of East Siberia near Irkutsk. In 1725–27, Luzhin participated in the first Kamchatka Expedition led by Vitus Bering. Named in honor: Luzhin Strait. | Kuril Islands |
| | Ivan Lyakhov‡ (?–c. 1800) merchant | Lyakhov, a merchant, investigated the New Siberian Islands in three expeditions on dogsleds in 1770, 1773–74 and 1775. He hoped to find mammoth ivory there as he believed the islands were mainly formed by a substratum of bones and tusks of mammoths. He explored the follow-up Lyakhovsky Islands, crossed the Sannikov Strait and discovered Kotelny Island. Named in honor: Lyakhovsky Islands. | New Siberian Islands |
| | Vladimir Lysenko† (born 1955) traveler, scientist, circumnavigator | Dr. Vladimir Lysenko had three globe circumnavigations: (1) in a car (1997–2002), crossed 62 countries; (2) on a bicycle, crossed 29 countries; (3) along the equator, from west to east, deviating no more than two degrees of latitude from the Equator – starting in Libreville (Gabon), Vladimir had successfully crossed (in a car, a motor boat, a yacht, a ship, a kayak, a bicycle, and by foot) Africa, Indian Ocean, Indonesia, Pacific Ocean, South America and Atlantic Ocean with finish in Libreville in 2012. He also completed project titled "From Earth's Bowels to Stratosphere". Vladimir rafted on rivers in 63 countries. He visited all 195 UN member and observer states. | Lysenko's circumnavigations |

=== M ===
| Portrait | Person | Achievements | Image |
|---|---|---|---|
| Makarov | Stepan Makarov‡ (1849–1904); Russian admiral, oceanographer, naval engineer and inventor, hero of the Russo-Turkish War (1877–1878) and Russo-Japanese War, commander of the Russian Pacific Fleet | Makarov built and captained the world's first torpedo boat tender Velikiy Knyaz Konstantin. He was the first in the world to successfully launch torpedoes (against the Turkish armed ship Intibah in 1877). He was one of the developers of the Russian Flag semaphore system and insubmersibility theory. Makarov directed two round-the-world oceanographic expeditions on the Vityaz in 1886–89 and in 1894–96. He built and commanded Yermak, the world's first true icebreaker, which was able to ride over and crash pack ice. Yermak was tested in two Arctic expeditions in 1899 and in 1901. Admiral Makarov was killed in action during the 1904–05 war with Japan after his battleship Petropavlovsk struck a naval mine. Named in honor: Makarov (town), Admiral Makarov State Maritime Academy, Admiral Makarov National University of Shipbuilding, Russian cruiser Admiral Makarov (1906), Icebreaker Admiral Makarov. | Corvette Vityaz Icebreaker Yermak |
| Malygin on a commemorative coin | Stepan Malygin‡ (?–1764); Russian Navy captain, navigator, cartographer (Malygin, Ovtsyn, Chelyuskin, Kh. Laptev and D. Laptev on a commemorative coin) | Malygin was the first to write a manual on navigation in the Russian language in 1733. In early 1736, he was appointed leader of the western unit of the Great Northern Expedition. In 1736–37, two boats Perviy (First) and Vtoroy (Second) under the command of Malygin and A. Skuratov undertook a voyage from the Dolgiy Island in the Barents Sea to the mouth of the Ob River. During this trip, Malygin for the first time described and mapped the part of the Russian Arctic coastline between the Pechora and Ob Rivers. Named in honor: Malygin Strait, Icebreaker Malygin (1912). | Bely Island and Malygin Strait |
| Matisen | Fyodor Matisen‡ (1872–1921); Russian Navy officer, hydrographer | Matisen replaced Nikolai Kolomeitsev as commander of Eduard Toll's Zarya during the Russian Polar Expedition in 1900–03. He was the first to make a thorough geographical survey of the Nordenskiöld Archipelago, exploring it on dogsled and discovering and naming 40 of its islands. Subsequently, Toll and Matisen led Zarya across the Laptev Sea to the New Siberian Islands. The ship was trapped in fast ice, and Toll and three companions went in search of the elusive Sannikov Land on foot and kayaks, and were lost. When Zarya became able to set sail, Matisen made for the Lena River delta. | Nordenskiöld Archipelago |
| Matyushkin | Fyodor Matyushkin‡ (1799–1872); Russian admiral, circumnavigator | Matyushkin studied in Tsarskoselsky College together with Alexander Pushkin. He participated in Vassili Golovnin's world cruise aboard the Kamchatka in 1817–19. In 1820–24 he took part in Ferdinand Wrangel's Arctic expedition to the East Siberian Sea and the Chukchi Sea. They explored and mapped the Medvyezhi Islands. Following this survey, Matyushkin on his own explored a vast tundra area east of the Kolyma River. In 1825–27, he joined Wrangel in his world cruise aboard Krotky. | Kolyma region nature |
| Middendorf | Alexander Middendorf* (1815–1894) zoologist, botanist, geographer, hippologist. agriculturalist | In 1840 Middendorf took part in Karl Baer's expedition to the Kola Peninsula and Lapland. In 1843–45 he pioneered the scientific exploration of the Taimyr Peninsula and discovered the Putorana Plateau on Central Siberian Plateau. Then he traveled along the coast of the Sea of Okhotsk and entered the lower Amur River valley. He studied the ethnography of Siberian peoples, and the climate, animals and plants of Siberia. He was a founder of permafrost science and the Vice President of the Russian Geographical Society. He determined the southern border of the permafrost and explained the high sinuosity of the northern boundary of the taiga zone. In 1870 he accompanied Grand Duke Alexei Alexandrovich to Novaya Zemlya and discovered the North Cape sea current (a part of the Norwegian Current). In 1870 he also explored the Baraba steppe, and in 1878 he travelled in Fergana Valley. Named in honor: Middendorff Bay, Middendorff's grasshopper warbler. | Putorana Plateau location Permafrost in the North Hemisphere |
| Miklouho-Maclay | Nicholas Miklouho-Maclay† (1846–1888) ethnologist, anthropologist, biologist | Miklouho-Maclay visited north-eastern New Guinea, the Philippines, Indonesia and Melanesia on a number of occasions starting in 1870, and for a long time he lived amongst the native Oceanian tribes, studying their way of life and customs. One of the earliest followers of Charles Darwin, he was among the first to refute the then prevailing view that the different 'races' of mankind belonged to different species. He arrived in Sydney in 1878 and organised a zoological centre known as the Marine Biological Station, the first marine biological research institute in Australia. He married a daughter of the Premier of New South Wales, John Robertson, and returned to Russia. Being in poor health after the trip he died, and left his skull to the St. Petersburg Military and Medical Academy. Named in honor: Macleay Museum, N. N. Miklukho-Maklai Institute of Ethnology and Anthropology. | Papua New Guinea Maklay among the Papuans |
| Milescu | Nicolae Milescu* (1636–1708) writer, scientist, traveler, geographer, diplomat | In 1671 Milescu went from Moldavia to Russia, where he became a diplomat. He wrote the first arithmetics textbook in the Russian language, Arithmologion. He led the Russian diplomatic mission to China in 1675–78, for the first time among Russian ambassadors travelling to Beijing through East Siberia rather than through Mongolia. After his assistant Ignatiy Milovanov (sent beforehand) Milescu was the first known European to cross the Amur River from the north and reach Beijing by that route. Milescu made the first detailed description of Lake Baikal and all the rivers feeding the lake, and he was the first to point out Baikal's unfathomable depth. His travel notes also contain valuable descriptions of major Siberian rivers and the first ever orographic scheme of East Siberia. | Milescue and his route from Moscow to China |
| | Fyodor Minin‡ (c. 1709–after 1742); Russian Navy officer | In the 1730s, Minin participated in the Great Northern Expedition. In 1736, he joined the unit led by Dmitry Ovtsyn. In 1738 together with Dmitry Sterlegov he led the group that charted the Arctic coastline east of the Yenisei river for some 250 km. In 1738–42, Minin made several vain attempts to sail around the Taimyr Peninsula. He also mapped and described Dikson Island. Named in honor: Minina Skerries. | Location of the Minina Skerries |
| | Ivan Moskvitin* (?–after 1645); Siberian Cossack leader | Moskvitin came with ataman Dmitry Kopylov from Tomsk to Yakutsk and then to a new fort on the Aldan River in 1638. In 1639 Kopylov sent Moskvitin in command of 20 Tomsk Cossacks and 29 Krasnoyarsk Cossacks to look for silver ore to the east. Leading the party, Moskvitin became the first Russian to reach the Pacific Ocean and to discover the Sea of Okhotsk, building a winter camp on its shore at the Ulya River mouth. In 1640 the Cossacks apparently sailed south, explored the south-eastern shores of the Okhotsk Sea and probably reached the mouth of the Amur River. On their way back they discovered the Shantar Islands. Based on Moskvitin's account, Kurbat Ivanov draw the first Russian map of the Far East in 1642. Moskvitin, presumably a native of Moscow, personally brought the news of the discovery of the eastern ocean to his native city. | Location of the Shantar Islands in the Sea of Okhotsk |
| Müller | Gerhard Friedrich Müller* (1705–1783) historian, ethnologist | Müller came to St. Petersburg in 1725 and became a co-founder of the Russian Academy of Sciences. In 1733–43 he participated in the Academic Squad of the Great Northern Expedition and traveled extensively through Siberia, studying its geography and peoples. Müller is considered to be one of the fathers of ethnography. He collected vernacular stories and archival documents about Russian explorers of Siberia, including Pyanda, Fedot Popov and Semyon Dezhnyov. He was among the first to write a general account of Russian history based on extensive study of documentary sources. He put forth the Normanist theory, a controversial accentuation of the role of Scandinavians and Germans in the history of Russia. | Kunstkamera, the first building of the Russian Academy of Sciences |
| Muravyov-Amursky | Nikolay Muravyov-Amursky* (1809–1881); Russian Army general, statesman, diplomat | In 1847 Muravyov became the governor general of Eastern Siberia. He pursued the Russian exploration and settlement of the territories north of the Amur River. He assisted in the organisation of Gennady Nevelskoy's expeditions, which led to the Russian presence near Amur estuary and on Sakhalin. In 1854 military troops sailed down the Amur, in 1855 the first settlers reached the river mouth, and in 1856 the city of Blagoveshchensk was founded. In 1858, Muravyov concluded the Treaty of Aigun with China, which recognised the Amur River as a border between the two countries and granted Russia easier access to the Pacific Ocean. The new territories acquired by Russia included Priamurye and most of the territories of modern Primorsky and Khabarovsk Krais. For this achievement Muravyov was granted the title of Count Amursky. The Treaty of Aigun was confirmed and expanded the Convention of Peking of 1860, which granted Russia the right to the Ussuri krai and the south of Primorsky Krai. To defend the new lands Muravyov created the Amur Cossacks corps. Named in honor: Muravyov-Amursky Peninsula. | Muravyov's first expedition off Aigun Monument in Khabarovsk (5000 ruble banknote) |
| Mushketov | Ivan Mushketov! (1850–1902) geologist, geographer | In 1873–79 Mushketov traveled extensively in Central Asia, discovering and cataloguing mineral deposits. He produced the first geological map of Turkestan (together with S. Romanovsky). Mushketov also started observations of earthquakes in Kazakhstan, organized regular observation of the glaciers of the Caucasus, and researched the gold mines of the Urals. He led the team that surveyed the territory for the future Circum-Baikal Railway. | Central Asia |

=== N ===
| Portrait | Person | Achievements | Image |
|---|---|---|---|
| Nagurski | Ivan Nagurski‡ (1888–1976) engineer, Russian Navy officer, pioneer of aviation, hero of the First World War and Russian Civil War | Nagurski was among the first pilots of the Russian Navy. In 1914 he was tasked with the difficult mission of locating the expeditions of Georgy Sedov, Georgy Brusilov, and Vladimir Rusanov all lost in the Russian Arctic. He flew five missions, spending more than ten hours in the air and travelling more than a thousand kilometers over land and the Barents Sea reaching as far as the 76th parallel north. He did not find the expeditions, but became the first polar aviator in history. Later he performed the first ever loop with a flying boat. Named in honor: Nagurskoye airfield. | Nagurski's plane in the Arctic off Novaya Zemlya |
| Nevelskoy | Gennady Nevelskoy* (1813–1876); Russian admiral | In 1848 Nevelskoy led the expedition in the Russian Far East, exploring the area of Sakhalin and the Amur Liman (which he found possible to sail through on tall ships). He proved that the Tatar Strait was not a gulf, but indeed a strait, connected to the Amur River's estuary by a narrow section later called Nevelskoy Strait. Not knowing about the efforts of Japanese navigator Mamiya Rinzo who explored the same area earlier, Nevelskoy's report was taken as the first proof that Sakhalin was indeed an island. In 1850 Nevelskoy founded Nikolayevsk-on-Amur, the first Russian settlement in the lower Amur region. He also founded several military posts on Sakhalin. Named in honor: Nevelskoy Strait, Nevelsk. | Nevelskoy Strait is the narrowest part of Tatar Strait |
| Nikitin | Afanasy Nikitin† (?–1472) merchant, writer | In 1466, Nikitin left his hometown of Tver on a commercial trip to India. He traveled down the Volga River, reached Derbent, then Baku and later Persian Empire by crossing the Caspian Sea, where he lived for a year. In 1469 Nikitin arrived in Ormus and then, crossing the Arabian Sea, reached the sultanate of Bahmani, where he lived for 3 years. On his way back, Nikitin visited the African continent (Somalia), Muscat, Trabzon and in 1472 arrived at Feodosiya by crossing the Black Sea. Thus Nikitin became one of the first Europeans to travel to and to document his visit to India. He described his trip in a narrative known as A Journey Beyond the Three Seas, which is a valuable study of the 15th-century India, its social system, government, military (Nikitin witnessed war-games featuring war elephants), its economy, religion and lifestyles. | Persia India |

=== O ===
| Portrait | Person | Achievements | Image |
|---|---|---|---|
| Obruchev | Vladimir Obruchev* (1863–1956) geologist, geographer, science fiction author | Having graduated from the Petersburg Mining Institute in 1886, Obruchev went to Siberia. He studied gold-mining and assisted in constructing the Trans-Siberian and Central Asian Railways. In Central Asia he explored the Kara Kum Desert, the shores of the Amu Darya River, and the old riverbeds of the Uzbois. In 1892–94 Obruchev took part in Grigory Potanin's expedition to Mongolia and North China. He explored the Transbaikal area, Dzhungaria and the Altai Mountains. Having spent half a century in exploring Siberia and Inner Asia, Obruchev summarized his findings in the extensive work The Geology of Siberia. He studied the origins of loess, the ice formation and permafrost, and the tectonics of Siberia. All together, he authored over a thousand scientific works. Obruchev is also known as the author of two popular science fiction novels, Plutonia (1915) and Sannikov Land (1924). These stories, imitating the pattern of Arthur Conan Doyle's The Lost World, depict in vivid detail the discovery of an isolated world of prehistoric animals in hitherto unexplored large islands in the Arctic. Named in honor: Obruchev Hills, Obruchev crater (Moon), 3128 Obruchev (asteroid), Obruchevsky District. | Siberian craton |
| Ovtsyn | Dmitry Ovtsyn‡ (?–after 1757); Russian Navy officer, hydrographer | In 1737–38 Ovtsyn led one of the units of the Great Northern Expedition that charted the coastline of the Kara Sea east of the Ob River, making the first hydrographic description of the large Gydan Peninsula and part of the Taymyr Peninsula. In 1741–42 Ovtsyn took part in Vitus Bering's voyage to the shores of North America. | Gydan Peninsula |

=== P ===
| Portrait | Person | Achievements | Image |
|---|---|---|---|
| Pakhtusov | Pyotr Pakhtusov‡ (1800–1835); Russian Navy officer, hydrographer (a monument in Kronstadt) | A participant of the earlier explorations by Fyodor Litke, Pakhtusov led two expeditions to Novaya Zemlya in 1832 and 1835. He twice wintered on the islands and took detailed meteorological observations. Together with fellow explorer and cartographer Avgust Tsivolko, Pakhtusov made the first reliable maps of Novaya Zemlya's southern shores. | Novaya Zemlya |
| Pallas | Peter Simon Pallas~ (1741–1811) naturalist, zoologist, botanist, geographer | Born in Berlin, Pallas was invited by Catherine the Great to become a professor at the St Petersburg Academy of Sciences. In 1768–74, he led an academic expedition to the Central Russia, Povolzhye, the Caspian Sea, the Urals, and Siberia, reaching as far east as Transbaikal. Pallas sent regular reports to St. Petersburg covering the topics of geology, native peoples, new plants and animals. He became a favourite of Catherine II and was provided with the specimens collected by other naturalists to compile the Flora Rossica (publ. 1784–1815) and Zoographica Rosso-Asiatica (1811–31). He also published an account of Johann Anton Güldenstädt's travels in the Caucasus and the journals of Georg Wilhelm Steller from Kamchatka and Alaska. In 1793–94 Pallas led an expedition to southern Russia, visiting the Crimea and the Black Sea, the Caucasus and the Dnieper. He discovered and described a large number of new species and amassed a vast natural history collection. Named in honor: pallasite (meteorite type), Pallasovka (town), asteroid 21087 Petsimpallas, Pallas's cat, Pallas's squirrel, Pallas's gull and other species. | Krasnojarsk, the first known pallasite meteorite Pallas's cat |
| | Ivan Papanin‡ (1894–1986); Soviet admiral, scientist, twice a Hero of the Soviet Union | In 1931 Papanin took part in the expedition on icebreaker Malygin to Franz Josef Land, where in 1932–33 he was the chief of a polar expedition on the Hooker Island. In 1934–35 he was the head of a polar station on Cape Chelyuskin. In 1937–38 he was the head of the drifting ice station North Pole-1, the world's first expedition of its kind. Together with Ernst Krenkel, Yevgeny Fyodorov and Pyotr Shirshov he landed on the Arctic drifting ice-floes in an airplane flown by Mikhail Vodopyanov. For 234 days the team carried out a wide range of scientific observations in the near-polar zone, until taken back. In 1939–46 Papanin became the head of the Glavsevmorput, an establishment that oversaw operations on the Northern Sea Route. In 1940 he organized the expedition that rescued the ice-trapped icebreaker Sedov. | |
| | Maksim Perfilyev* (?–after 1638); Siberian Cossack leader | In 1618–19 Perfilyev became a co-founder of Yeniseysky ostrog, the first Russian fortress on the central Yenisey River and a major standpoint for further expeditions eastward. In 1618–27 Perfilyev made several journeys on the Angara, Ilim, Lena and Vitim rivers, and built several new ostrogs. In 1631 he founded Bratsky ostrog (follow-up Bratsk). In 1638 he became the first Russian to set foot in Transbaikalia. | Yenisey basin |
| | Yakov Permyakov‡ (?–1712); Siberian Cossack, seafarer, merchant | In 1710, while sailing from the Lena River to the Kolyma River, Permyakov discovered the Medvezhyi Islands, siting them from afar. In 1712, Permyakov and his companion Merkury Vagin crossed the Yana Bay from the mouth of the Yana over the ice and explored Bolshoy Lyakhovsky island, the southernmost of the New Siberian Islands, thus initiating the exploration of the archipelago. On their way back Permyakov and Vagin were murdered by mutineering expedition members. | Medvyezhi Islands |
| | Ivan Petlin! (?–after 1619); Siberian Cossack, diplomat | Petlin was the first Russian to reach China on an official diplomatic mission in 1618–19. His expedition may have been the second European expedition to reach China from the west by an overland route (after that of Bento de Góis) since the fall of the Yuan Dynasty. Together with Andrey Mundov and 10 other men, Petlin went south up the Ob River, crossed the Abakan Range, went south to Tuva and rounding Uvs Nuur reached the court of the Altan Khan of the Khotgoid. Then they passed through Mongolia to the Great Wall of China and Beijing. He was not allowed to see the Wanli Emperor because of not bringing proper tribute. He brought back a letter in Chinese inviting Russians to open trade, but no one in Russia was able to read it until 1675. An account of Petlin's expedition was translated into English and published in Samuel Purchas's Pilgrims in 1625, and then translated into other European languages. | Petlin's expedition established Russia-China relations |
| Polyakov | Valeri Polyakov$ (born 1942) cosmonaut and physician, Hero of the Soviet Union, Hero of Russia | Polyakov holds the world record for the longest continuous spaceflight in history, 437 days 18 hours (more than 14 months), which he spent aboard Soyuz TM-18, Mir space station and Soyuz TM-20 in 1994–95. With his earlier expedition to Mir on Soyuz TM-6 and back on Soyuz TM-7 in 1988–89, his combined space experience is more than 22 months. | Mir SS with Soyuz TM-20 at the top |
| Popov | Fedot Popov^ (?–1648/54) merchant | An agent of Moscow merchant Alexey Usov, Fedot Popov came to Srednekolymsk in Siberia in 1645. There he organized an expedition eastward, and brought in Semyon Dezhnev. In 1648 they sailed down to the Arctic and became the first to pass through the Bering Strait and to discover Chukchi Peninsula and the Bering Sea. All their kochi and most of their men (including Popov himself) were lost in storms and clashes with the natives. A small group led by Dezhnyov reached the Anadyr River. In 1653–54, while fighting with Koryaks near Anadyrsk, Dezhnyov captured Popov's Yakut wife, who confirmed him dead. When Vladimir Atlasov came to conquer Kamchatka in 1697, he heard from the locals about a certain Fedotov, who had lived with his men near Kamchatka River and had married local women – so the Fedotov legend appeared. G. F. Müller thought Fedotov was Fedot's son, while Stepan Krasheninnikov thought he was Fedot himself, thus deeming Popov to be the possible discoverer of Kamchatka. | 1773 map of Chukchi Peninsula, showing the 1648 route of Popov and Dezhnyov |
| Posyet | Konstantin Posyet^ (1819–1899); Russian admiral, military writer, statesman, diplomat | In 1852–54, Posyet journeyed on the frigate Pallada to Japan under the command of admirals Yevfimy Putyatin and Ivan Unkovsky. Accompanied also by novelist Ivan Goncharov and inventor Alexander Mozhaisky, Posyet explored and mapped the northern coastline of the Sea of Japan, including the follow-up Possiet Bay. In 1856 he carried to Japan the news of the ratification of the Treaty of Shimoda. Possiet's journeys and published observations made him an expert on Japan in Russia. Having become Minister of Ways and Communications, he negotiated the Treaty of Saint Petersburg (1875) with Enomoto Takeaki, which brought the entire Sakhalin Island into the Russian fold. He prepared the construction of the Trans-Siberian Railway and was a leading advocate for the restoration of the white-blue-red flag of Russia in 1896. Named in honor: Possiet Bay, Posyet port. | Possiet Bay |
| Potanin | Grigory Potanin! (1835–1920) geographer, ethnographer, botanist | Potanin traveled extensively through Siberia, studying its nature and peoples, once accompanied by Nikolai Yadrintsev. In 1876 and 1879 Potanin led two expeditions into Mongolia. In 1884–86 Potanin explored Northern China and Tibet, returning to Russia through the Qilian Mountains and Mongolia. He encountered the Salar people and made other ethnographic and geographic discoveries, including the first account of the East and West Uighur languages. In 1989 Potanin became one of the founders of Tomsk University, the first university in Asian Russia. In 1892–93 he again explored Northern China and Sichuan accompanied by geologist Vladimir Obruchev. Before reaching Tibet, Potanin was forced to turn back because of the illness and death of his wife Alexandra, who was the first woman member of the Russian Geographical Society. In 1899 Potanin travelled to Greater Khingan. Named in honor: Potanin Glacier, 9915 Potanin (asteroid). | Tibetan Plateau |
| Poyarkov | Vassili Poyarkov* (?–after 1668); Siberian Cossack ataman | In 1643, Poyarkov was sent with 133 men from Yakutsk to explore the new lands south of Stanovoy Ridge. He reached the upper Zeya River in the country of the Daur people, who were paying tribute to the Manchu Chinese. After wintering, in 1644 Poyarkov pushed down the Zeya and became the first Russian to reach the Amur River. He descended to the Nivkh people country and discovered the mouth of the Amur River from land. Since his Cossacks provoked the enmity of the locals they passed, Poyarkov chose a different way back. They built boats and in 1645 sailed along the Sea of Okhotsk coast to the Ulia River and spent the next winter in the huts that had been built by explorer Ivan Moskvitin six years earlier. In 1646 they returned to Yakutsk. | Amur River basin |
| | Gavriil Pribylov^ (?–1796) navigator | Pribylov, commanding the ship St. George, led an expedition funded jointly by Grigory Shelikhov and Pavel Lebedev-Lastochkin with an aim to find the lucrative breeding grounds of fur seals, long sought by Siberian merchants. He discovered St. George Island in the Bering Sea in 1786, by following the sounds of barking northern fur seals and possibly hinted by Aleut people. A year later in 1787, Pribylov discovered St. Paul Island to the north of St. George. Named in honor: Pribilof Islands. | Pribilof Islands |
| Pronchishchev | Vasili Pronchishchev‡ (1702–1736); Russian Navy officer (forensic facial reconstruction) | In 1735–36 Pronchishchev led one of the units of the Great Northern Expedition that discovered and mapped more than 500 miles of the Arctic shore to the west of the mouth of the Lena River. He took his wife Tatiana Pronchishcheva with him aboard the sloop Yakutsk. Despite the difficulties, they reached Taymyr Peninsula in 1736, having discovered the follow-up Faddey Islands, Komsomolskoy Pravdy Islands, Saint Peter Islands, and the east Byrranga Mountains on Taymyr. Pronchishchev and his wife died from illness on the way back and were buried at the mouth of the Olenek River | Location of the Komsomolskaya Pravda Islands |
| Pronchischeva | Tatiana Pronchishcheva‡ (1710–1736) first female Arctic explorer (forensic facial reconstruction) | Tatiana Pronchishcheva accompanied her husband Vasili Pronchishchev in 1735–36, during the Great Northern Expedition, when they explored the coastline west of the mouth of the Lena River, making many discoveries. She is considered to be the first known female explorer of the Arctic. Tatiana died from illness on the way back, only 14 days after the death of her husband Vasili. Named in honor: Pronchishcheva Bay | Location of Pronchishcheva Bay |
| Przhevalsky | Nikolai Przhevalsky! (1839–1888); Russian Army general, geographer, naturalist | In 1867–69 Przhevalsky led an expedition to the basin of the Ussuri River. Subsequently, he made four major journeys to largely unknown parts of Central Asia, in total covering more than 40,000 km in length. In 1870–73 he crossed the Gobi desert to Beijing, explored the upper Yangtze River, and crossed into Tibet, surveying over 18,000 km^{2} and collecting some 5,000 plant species, 1,000 birds, 3,000 insects, 70 reptiles and the skins of 130 different mammals. In 1876–77, travelling through southern Xinjiang and the Tian Shan range, he visited Lake Lop Nor. In 1879–80 he traveled via Hami City and the Qaidam basin to Lake Koko Nor. Passing over Tian Shan into Tibet, he was 260 km from Lhasa before being turned back by Tibetan officials. In 1883–85 Przhevalsky traveled across Gobi to Alashan and Tian Shan, then back to Koko Nor, and westwards to Lake Issyk Kul. His journeys opened a new era for the study of the geography, fauna and flora of Central Asia. He was the first to report on the wild population of Bactrian camels, to describe the Przewalski's gazelle and the Przewalski's horse (the only extant wild horse). Named in honor: Przewalski's gazelle, Przewalski's horse, Przhevalsk (Kyrgyzstan), Przhevalskoye. | Przewalski's horse Monument in St. Petersburg |
| Putyatin | Yevfimy Putyatin^ (1803–1883); Russian admiral, diplomat | In 1822–25 Putyatin sailed with Mikhail Lazarev around the world aboard the Suvorov. Later he led diplomatic missions to Iran and the Caucasus. Together with Admiral Ivan Unkovsky he led a scientific round-the-world expedition on the frigate Pallada to Japan in 1852–55. This expedition contributed many important discoveries in oceanography. One of the results achieved was the Treaty of Shimoda with Japan. In 1857–58 Putyatin twice traveled to both Japan and China and explored Peter the Great Gulf, Russky Island, the Eastern Bosphorus and other features of the Russian shores of the Sea of Japan. | Peter the Great Gulf |
| | Demid Pyanda* (?–after 1637); Siberian Cossack ataman | Coming from Mangazeya, Demid Pyanda was a hunter for Siberian furs. Starting his long journey from Turukhansk, in three and a half years from 1620 to 1624 Pyanda passed a total of 8000 km of hitherto unknown large Siberian rivers. He explored some 2300 km of Lower Tunguska (Nizhnyaya Tunguska in the Russian language) and, having reached the upper part of Tunguska, he discovered the great Siberian river Lena and explored some 2400 km of its length. When doing this, he became the first Russian to reach Yakutia and meet the Yakuts. He returned up Lena until it became too rocky and shallow, and by land reached Angara. On his way, Pyanda became the first Russian to meet the Buryats. He built new boats and explored some 1400 km of the Angara, finally discovering that the Angara (a Buryat name) and the Upper Tunguska (Verkhnyaya Tunguska, as known by Russians) are one and the same river. | Siberian river routes |

=== R ===
| Portrait | Person | Achievements | Image |
|---|---|---|---|
| Remezov | Semyon Remezov* (c. 1642–after 1720) cartographer, geographer, historian (a monument in the Tobolsk Kremlin) | In 1683–1710 Remezov described and mapped the Tobolsk region, where he was born. He wrote the Remezov Chronicle, one of the earliest historical accounts of Siberia and its exploration, a part of the Siberian Chronicles. In 1699–1701 he created the Chart book of Siberia, the first large format cartographic atlas of Siberia. In total, he made more than 200 charts and maps of eastern Russian regions. | Siberian peoples, Remezov Chronicle |
| Rezanov | Nikolai Rezanov^ (1764–1807) statesman, diplomat | Rezanov was one of the founders of the Russian-American Company in 1799, based on the earlier Shelikhov-Golikov Company. In 1803–06, he was made an ambassador to Japan by Alexander I of Russia, and co-led the first Russian circumnavigation of the world, aboard the Nadezhda under the captaincy of Ivan Krusenstern. Rezanov was in command as far as Kamchatka. After his embassy to Japan failed, he was made an inspector of Russian colonies in America. In 1806 he managed to open trade with Spanish California, conclude a treaty, and become engaged with Concepción Argüello, the daughter of the comandante of San Francisco. Rezanov died in Siberia, however, on a journey back to St. Petersburg while carrying the treaty to the capital. Rezanov's love affair with Concepción Argüello inspired a ballad by the San Francisco author, Francis Bret Harte, and a 1937 novel, Rezánov and Doña Concha, by another SF author, Gertrude Atherton, as well as a very successful 1979 Russian rock opera Juno and Avos by the composer Alexei Rybnikov and the poet Andrey Voznesensky. | A replica of Russian trading post in Sitka, Alaska |
| Rimsky-Korsakov | Voin Rimsky-Korsakov* (1822–1871); Russian Navy officer, hydroghafer and geographer | An elder brother of Nikolai Rimsky-Korsakov (the composer and conductor), in the 1850s and 1860s Voin Rimsky-Korsakov explored the area of the Sea of Japan near Ussuri Krai, including Sakhalin Island, the Amur Liman and the Strait of Tartary. Later he also surveyed the shores of Kamchatka and the Kuril Islands. Named in honor: Rimsky-Korsakov Archipelago. | Rimsky-Korsakov Archipelago |
| Roerich | Nicholas Roerich! (1874–1947) painter, philosopher, archeologist, writer, public figure, traveler | Roerich emigrated to the U. S. after the Russian Revolution. By the sale of his paintings and writings, and the gains from the activity of his cultural and enlightener organizations, Roerich was able to collect the finance and lead a major expedition to Central Asia in 1924–28, in which his family, including his wife Helena Roerich, participated. The expedition went through Sikkim, Kashmir, Ladakh, Xinjiang, Siberia, Altai, Mongolia, Tibet, and unstudied areas of the Himalayas. Archeological and ethnographical investigations were conducted, dozens of new mountain peaks and passes were marked on maps, rare manuscripts were found, and some of the best series of Roerich's paintings were created. In 1934–35 Roerich conducted an expedition in Inner Mongolia, Manchuria and China, collecting nearly 300 species of xerophytes, herbs, manuscripts and archeological relics. Roerich was an author and initiator of an international pact for the protection of artistic and academic institutions and historical sites (Roerich’s Pact, 1935) and a founder of an international movement for the defence of culture. He created about 7,000 paintings and founded a number of scientific and cultural institutions in the U. S., Europe and India. Named in honor: Roerich’s Pact, 4426 Roerich. | Peaks and passes named after the Roerichs in the Altai Mountains Institute of Himalayan studies "Urusvati", founded by the Roerichs |
| Alexander Nevsky | Alexander Nevsky! (Rurikid) (1220–1263); Grand Prince of Novgorod and Vladimir, national hero and patron saint of Russia | Prince Alexander Yaroslavich Nevsky traveled to the Mongolian capital Karakorum in Central Asia, between 1247 and 1249, accompanied by his brother Andrey Yaroslavich. They were summoned there by the Genghisid Khans who had conquered Rus' a few years before. Unlike their father Yaroslav II of Vladimir, who had come into Karakorum in 1245–46 and was poisoned by the Mongols, Alexander and Andrey were able to get back to Rus', confirmed in power by their new overlords. Russian princes were among the first known Europeans to travel so far into Asia, making their journey around the same time as the Italian monk Plano Carpini traveled to Mongolia. Named in honor: Order of Alexander Nevsky, numerous Alexander Nevsky Cathedrals, churches, monasteries. | |
| Rusanov | Vladimir Rusanov‡ (1875–1913?) geologist | In 1909–11 Rusanov carried out explorations in the Novaya Zemlya archipelago. In 1912 he commanded a government expedition to Svalbard to investigate its coal reserves. They sailed on the small ship Herkules under Captain Alexander Kuchin, Amundsen's South Pole expedition navigator. Concluding the work, part of the expedition returned to Russia, while the rest, without consultation with the authorities, set off with Rusanov in an incredibly rash attempt at reaching the Pacific via the Northern Sea Route, and disappeared in the Kara Sea. The relics of the expedition were found in 1937 in the Kolosovykh Islands. Soviet coal mining on Svalbard began in 1932. Rusanov and his expedition are among the prototypes for the novel The Two Captains by Veniamin Kaverin, where the search proceedings for fictional captain Tatarinov resemble the search for Rusanov. | Hercules schooner |

=== S ===
| Portrait | Person | Achievements | Image |
|---|---|---|---|
| Sagalevich | Anatoly Sagalevich‡ (born 1938) oceanographer, submersible pilot, Hero of Russia (right in photo with Vladimir Putin) | From 1979 Sagalevich has been the head of the Deepwater Submersibles Laboratory at the Shirshov Institute of Oceanology. He took part in the construction of the Pisces VIII, Pisces IX and MIR Deep Submergence Vehicles and completed more than 300 submersions as the chief pilot of DSVs. He piloted MIRs during expeditions to RMS Titanic, German battleship Bismarck, Soviet and Russian submarines K-278 Komsomolets and K-141 Kursk, and Japanese submarine I-52. Sagalevich holds the world record for the deepest fresh water dive at 1637 m in Lake Baikal aboard a Pisces in 1990. On August 2, 2007, he was the pilot of the MIR-1 DSV that reached the seabed at the North Pole during the Arktika 2007 expedition. | MIR submersible |
| Samoylovich | Rudolf Samoylovich‡ (1881–1940?) geographer | In 1912 Samoylovich took part in Vladimir Rusanov's geological expedition to Spitsbergen. He was one of the initiators and the first director of the Arctic and Antarctic Research Institute. In 1928 he was the head of the rescue party on the Krasin icebreaker, that saved most of the crew of the Airship Italia of Umberto Nobile. He participated in the polar flight of LZ 127 Graf Zeppelin in 1931 and headed expeditions on the icebreakers Vladimir Rusanov (1932), Georgy Sedov (1934), and Sadko (1936 and 1937–38). | |
| | Yakov Sannikov‡ (1780–after 1812) merchant | Exploring the New Siberian Islands, in 1800 Sannikov discovered and charted Stolbovoy Island, and then Faddeyevsky Island in 1805. In 1809–1810, he took part in the expedition led by Matvei Gedenschtrom. He discovered Bunge Land and suggested that there was a vast land north of Kotelny Island, thus introducing a theory about the existence of the legendary Sannikov Land. Named in honor: Sannikov Land, Sannikov Strait. | De Long Islands, beyond which the Sannikov Land was deemed to exist |
| Sarychev | Gavriil Sarychev^ (1763–1831); Russian admiral, cartographer | In 1785–94 Sarychev took part in the expedition sponsored by Catherine the Great and led by Joseph Billings. Commanding the ship Slava Rossii (Glory of Russia), he mapped the coastline of the Sea of Okhotsk from Okhotsk to Aldoma and many of the Aleutian Islands (especially Unalaska). He also described the Pribilof Islands, St. Matthew Island, St. Lawrence Island, Gvozdev, and King Island. He was in charge of hydrographic research in Russia from 1808 and led the compilation of the Atlas of the Northern Part of the Pacific Ocean in 1826. Named in honor: Sarychev Peak, Cape Sarichef Airport, Sarichef Island. | Russian Orthodox Church of the Holy Ascension, Unalaska |
| Savitskaya | Svetlana Savitskaya (born 1948) female cosmonaut, aviator, twice a Hero of the Soviet Union, politician (Savitskaya with her 1982 crew fellows Popov and Serebrov) | Savitskaya was the second woman in space (after Valentina Tereshkova) and the first woman to conduct an extra-vehicular activity. She achieved this during the two successful expeditions to the Salyut 7 space station in 1982 and 1984, making her spacewalk on July 25, 1984. | Model of Salyut 7 with two Soyuz spacecraft, VDNKh, Moscow |
| Schantz | Johan Eberhard von Schantz† (1802–1880) admiral, ship designer, explorer | Finnish-born admiral of the Russian Imperial Navy who circumnavigated the globe as the commander of the Imperial Navy ship America in 1834–1836. He rediscovered the Wotho Atoll, originally discovered by the Spanish expedition of Ruy López de Villalobos in the 1540s. Named in honor: Schantz Islands (now Wotho Atoll). | Wotho Atoll |
| | Otto Schmidt‡ (1891–1956) mathematician, astronomer, geophysicist, statesman, Hero of the Soviet Union | In 1932–39 Schmidt was the head of the Chief Directorate of the Northern Sea Route. In 1929–30, travelling on the icebreaker Sedov, he established the first research station on Franz Josef Land, explored the northwestern Kara Sea and western Severnaya Zemlya, discovering a few islands. In 1932 his expedition on the icebreaker Sibiryakov with Captain Vladimir Voronin made the first non-stop voyage through the Northern Sea Route from Arkhangelsk to the Pacific without wintering. In 1933–34 Schmidt and Voronin led the voyage on the steamship Cheliuskin, that resulted in the loss of the ship and evacuation of the crew. In 1937 Schmidt supervised an airborne expedition that established the first ever drift-ice station, North Pole-1. Named in honor: 2108 Otto Schmidt (minor planet). | Northern Sea Route |
| Schrenck | Leopold von Schrenck* (1826–1894) zoologist, geographer, ethnographer | Schrenck explored the fauna of the Russian Far East, in Amurland between 1853 and 1854, and on Sakhalin in 1854–55, discovering a number of animals. Later he turned to the study of the native peoples of Russia. He coined the term Paleo-Asiatic peoples and was a director of the Peter the Great Museum of Anthropology and Ethnography in St Petersburg. Named in honor: Amur sturgeon, Manchurian black water snake. | Manchurian black water snake |
| Sedov | Georgy Sedov‡ (1877–1914); Russian Navy captain | In 1909 Sedov led the expedition that described the mouth of the Kolyma River. In 1910 he explored the Krestovaya Bay on Novaya Zemlya. He suggested an expedition to the North Pole and found private sponsors. In 1912 Sedov's ship "Svyatoy Muchenik Foka" (Saint Martyr Foka) sailed north but had to stay for the winter near Novaya Zemlya because of impassable ice. Sv. Foka reached Franz Josef Land then, but had to stop for another winter due to lack of coal. In early 1914, Sedov, sick with scurvy, set off with two companions for the North Pole with the draft dogs. Sedov died near Rudolf Island and was buried there, at Cape Auk. On the way back, at Franz Josef Land, the Sv. Foka rescued the two survivors of the Brusilov expedition, Valerian Albanov and Alexander Konrad. Named in honor: Icebreaker Sedov, Sedov (sailing ship). He and his last expedition are among the prototypes for the novel The Two Captains by Veniamin Kaverin, where the fictional captain Tatarinov has Sedov-like appearance and shares his passion for Arctic exploration. | Sedov amid the crew of St. Foka Franz Josef Land |
| Semyonov-Tyan-Shansky | Pyotr Semyonov-Tyan-Shansky! (1827–1914) geographer, statistician, entomologist | In 1856–57 Semyonov passed through the Altay Mountains, visited the Issyk Kul and came to the then largely unknown Tian Shan Mountains. He was the first European to see the peak of Khan Tengri. He disproved Alexander Humboldt's earlier claims about Tian Shan's supposed volcanic origins. In 1858, he published the first systematic description of the Tian Shan. Half a century later Nicholas II of Russia authorized him to add the epithet "Tian-Shansky" to his last name. For many years Semyonov served as chairman of Russia's Central Committee for Statistics, where he organized the first Russian Empire Census held in 1897. Semyonov amassed a large collection of the old Dutch masters, which now belongs to the Hermitage Museum, and an insect collection of c. 700,000 specimens. He was a member of 53 learned societies and headed the Russian Geographical Society for 40 years from 1873 until his death, using this position to encourage the exploration of inland Asia, notably by Nikolai Przhevalsky and Pyotr Kozlov. | Tian Shan and the Silk Road Khan Tengri |
| Senkevich | Yuri Senkevich† (1937–2003) physician, scientist, traveler, TV anchorman | Senkevich participated in the 12th Soviet Antarctic expedition at Vostok station in 1966–67. In 1969 he sailed with Thor Heyerdahl on the Ra papyrus boat, and later on the Ra II across the Atlantic Ocean in 1970. He also sailed with Heyerdahl on another reed boat the Tigris across the Indian Ocean in 1978. In 1973–2003, Senkevich was a host of the "Travelers' Club" show on Soviet Television for a record 30 years, making it into the Guinness Book of Records. He visited more than 200 countries as a journalist and TV anchorman. | Ra II boat in the Thor Heyerdahl Kon-Tiki Museum |
| Severtzov | Nikolai Severtzov! (1827–1885) naturalist | In 1857–58, on an expedition to Syr Darya in Central Asia, Severtzov was captured by Kokand bandits and severely wounded. He was freed after a month by the Russian military and continued his studies. In 1865–68 he explored the Tian Shan and Lake Issyk Kul. In 1877–78 he explored the unknown areas of the Pamir Mountains following a route close to the current Pamir Highway as far as Lake Yashil Kul on the Ghunt River. Severtzov wrote a major study of Turkestan zoology called Vertical and horizontal distribution of Turkestan wildlife (1873), which included the first description of a number of animals. | Argali |
| Shelikhov | Grigory Shelikhov^ (1747–1795) seafarer, merchant | Shelikhov organized commercial trips of merchant ships to the Kuril Islands and the Aleutian Islands starting in 1775. Together with Ivan Golikov, he founded the precursor of the Russian-American Company (the name appeared in 1799 after Shelikhov's death). In 1783–86, he led an expedition to the shores of Russian America, during which he founded the first permanent Russian settlement in North America in Three Saints Bay on Kodiak Island. In 1790 he hired Alexander Baranov to manage fur enterprise in America. Named in honor: Shelikhov Bay, Shelikhov Strait, Shelekhov. | The settlement of Shelikhov on Kodiak |
| Shirshov | Pyotr Shirshov‡ (1905–1953) oceanographer, hydrobiologist, statesman, Hero of the Soviet Union | Shirshov participated in numerous Arctic expeditions, including the ones on the icebreaker Sibiryakov (1932) and steamship Chelyuskin (1934). He was among the crew of the drifting ice station North Pole-1 in 1937–38. In 1942–48, Shirshov was a Maritime Minister of the Soviet Union. In 1946–53, he became the founder and the first director of the Institute of Oceanology of the Soviet Academy of Sciences. He wrote numerous works about plankton in the polar regions and proved that there is life in the high latitudes of the Arctic Ocean. Named in honor: Shirshov Institute of Oceanology | Arctic Ocean |
| Shishmaryov | Gleb Shishmaryov^ (1781–1835); Russian Navy officer, circumnavigator | In 1815–18 Shishmaryov accompanied Otto von Kotzebue on his circumnavigation on Rurik, including the visit to Alaska, when they discovered the Shishmaref Inlet. In 1820 he returned to Alaska accompanied by Lt. Mikhail Vasiliev. They explored the coast of Alaska from Kotzebue Sound to Icy Cape and later from Norton Sound to Cape Newenham. St. Lawrence Island was mapped on the return voyage. Named in honor: Shishmaref, Alaska, Shishmaref Inlet. | St. Lawrence Island near Alaska |
| Shkot | Nikolay Shkot* (1829–1870); Russian Navy officer | After being wounded in the Siege of Sevastopol (1854–1855), Shkot served in the Far East. In 1856–63 he explored Sakhalin, the Moneron Island and the coast of Primorsky Krai in the area of Peter the Great Gulf and Nakhodka Bay, making a number of discoveries. He founded a hydrographic post in what is now modern Nakhodka, and was one of the founders of Vladivostok in 1860. Named in honor: Shkot Island, Shkotovo (village), Shkotovka River. | Vladivostok and Nakhodka in the Russian Far East |
| Shokalsky | Yuly Shokalsky~ (1856–1940); Russian Navy officer, oceanographer, meteorologist, cartographer, geographer | In 1897–1901 Shokalsky researched Lake Ladoga. From 1907 he supervised all oceanographic works in Russia. He coined the term World Ocean. In 1919 he headed the commission that set up time zones in Russia. In 1918–31 he was the head of the Russian Geographical Society and contributed widely to Arctic exploration at this post. Named in honor: Shokalsky Strait, Shokalskogo Island. | A map of the Russian Empire by Shokalsky |
| Solovyev | Anatoly Solovyev (born 1948) cosmonaut, aviator, Hero of the Soviet Union | Solovyev holds the world record for the number of spacewalks (16), and accumulated time spent spacewalking (over 82 hours), which he performed during his five spaceflights. In 1988 he traveled on Soyuz TM-5 to the Mir space station and back on Soyuz TM-4. In 1990 he again traveled to Mir and back on Soyuz TM-9, and in 1990 made a similar journey on Soyuz TM-15. In 1995 he got to Mir on Space Shuttle STS-71 and went back on Soyuz TM-21, and in 1997–98 again traveled to Mir and back on Soyuz TM-26. | Solovyev on a spacewalk |
| Somov | Mikhail Somov§ (1908–1973) geographer, oceanologist, Hero of the Soviet Union | In 1950–51, Somov headed the second drifting ice station, North Pole-2. In 1955–57, he became the leader of the 1st Soviet Antarctic Expedition on the icebreakers Ob and Lena. The expedition established the first Soviet Antarctic station, Mirny, performed some observations and reconnaissance, and researched the oceanography of the Indian Ocean. Somov was also the first Soviet delegate to the international Scientific Committee for Antarctic Research. Named in honor: 3334 Somov (minor planet). | Vostok Station in Antarctica |
| | Mikhail Stadukhin* (?–1666); Siberian Cossack leader | In 1643, accompanied by Semyon Dezhnyov, Stadukhin led a group of Cossacks from Indigirka to the east by the Arctic coast. They discovered the Kolyma River and founded Srednekolymsk there. In 1649 he followed by sea the traces of Dezhnyov's and Fedot Popov's expedition to the east, which started earlier in 1648 (and reached the Bering Strait). He learned from the captive natives that two of Dezhnyov's kochi had been wrecked and the crews killed by the natives. Later Stadukhin found the connection of the Kolyma watershed to that of the Anadyr and thus explored the land way to the Chukchi Peninsula, where he found Dezhnyov in 1650. In 1651 Stadukhin set off south and discovered the Penzhin Bay of the northern Okhotsk Sea. He also may have explored the western shores of Kamchatka. | Kolyma River |
| | Georg Wilhelm Steller^ (1709–1746) botanist, zoologist, physician | In 1734 Steller moved from Bavaria to work at the Saint Petersburg Academy of Sciences. He traveled trough Siberia, researching its nature, and in 1740 reached Okhotsk and Kamchatka. He joined Vitus Bering on the voyage to North America. The expedition landed in Alaska at Kayak Island in 1741, staying only long enough to take on fresh water. During this time Steller became the first European naturalist to describe a number of North American plants and animals, including the Steller's jay. On the return journey the expedition was shipwrecked on Bering Island. Here Bering died, and almost half of the crew perished from scurvy. Despite the hardships, Steller studied the flora and fauna of the island in great detail. He collected the only existing detailed observations of the now extinct Steller sea cow, a large sirenian mammal. In the spring the crew constructed a new vessel and returned to Kamchatka, where Steller continued his research. He died on the journey to St. Petersburg, but his journals were published by Peter Simon Pallas and were later used by other explorers, including Captain Cook. Naned in honor: Steller's sea lion, Steller's eider, Steller's sea ape, Steller's sea eagle, Steller sea cow. | Steller's jay Extinct Steller's sea cow drawn by Steller |

=== T ===
| Portrait | Person | Achievements | Image |
|---|---|---|---|
| Tereshkova | Valentina Tereshkova$ (born 1937) cosmonaut, Hero of the Soviet Union, major general, politician | Aboard Vostok 6 on 16 June 1963 Tereshkova became the first woman as well as the first civilian to travel into space. On this mission, lasting almost three days in space, she performed various tests on herself to collect data on the reaction of the female body to spaceflight. She took photographs of the horizon, which were used to identify aerosol layers in the Earth atmosphere. Named in honor: Tereshkova crater (Moon). 1671 Chaika (minor planet, after Tereshkova's call sign). | Vostok 6 and Tereshkova |
| Tillo | Aleksey Tillo~ (1839–1900) geographer, cartographer, land surveyor, lieutenant general of the Russian Army | Tillo created the first correct relief map of European Russia in 1889. He coined the term Central Russian Upland. He measured the length of the main Russian rivers and the level difference of the Caspian Sea and the Sea of Aral. Named in honor: Tillo Islands. | Central Russian Upland location |
| | Gherman Titov$ (1935–2000) cosmonaut, Hero of the Soviet Union | Aboard Vostok 2 on August 6, 1961, Titov became the second man to orbit the Earth, the first to do it multiple times (a total of 17), the first to spend more than a day in space, and the first person to drive a spaceship manually. He also was the first person to sleep in space and to suffer from space sickness. He made the first manual photographs from orbit, thus setting a record for space photography. A month short of 26 years old at launch, he remains the youngest person to orbit the Earth. Named in honor: Titov (crater) (Moon). | |
| Toll | Eduard Toll‡ (1858–1902) zoologist, paleontologist, geologist | In 1885–86, Baron Toll took part in an expedition to the New Siberian Islands led by Alexander Bunge. In 1893 Toll led an academic expedition to Yakutia and explored the region between the lower Lena and Khatanga Rivers, the basins of the Yana, Indigirka, and Kolyma Rivers, the plateau between the Anabar and Popigay Rivers, and the Vasily Pronchischev mountain ridge (named by Toll) between the Olenek River and the Anabar. In 1899, Toll took part in a voyage of the icebreaker Yermak to Spitsbergen, led by Stepan Makarov. In 1900–02, Toll led an expedition on the ship Zarya to find the legendary Sannikov Land. Due to severe ice conditions the expedition was forced to spend two winters in the Arctic. Toll traveled to Bennett Island by sledge and kayak with three companions, and they were lost. In 1903 the search led by Mikhail Brusnev and Aleksandr Kolchak brought out the diaries and the collections of Toll's party. | Yakutia |
| | Yevgeny Tolstikov§ (1913–1987) geographer, Hero of the Soviet Union | In 1954 Tolstikov was the head of the drifting ice station North Pole-3 in the Arctic. In 1957–59 he led the 3rd Soviet Antarctic Expedition and founded the Sovetskaya and Pole of Inaccessibility Antarctic stations. The expedition discovered the Gamburtsev Mountain Range and other features of Antarctica relief under the ice. Tolstikov was the chief editor of the general atlas of the Antarctic. Named in honor: 3357 Tolstikov (minor planet). | The Pole of Inaccessibility Antarctic station |
| F.Tolstoy | Fyodor Ivanovich Tolstoy^ (1782–1846) nobleman, adventurer | A count from the Tolstoy family, Fyodor Tolstoy was known for his unusual temper, gambling and passion for duels. In 1803 he took part in the first Russian circumnavigation on Nadezhda, captained by Ivan Krusenstern. However, multiple quarrels with the crew and very bad behaviour, including successfully teaching a pet orangutan to cover the captain's longbook in ink, caused Tolstoy to be abandoned on a stop in Kamchatka with the aforementioned ape, whose later fate is unknown. On a different ship Tolstoy managed to get into Sitka, Alaska, where he spent several months among Alaskan natives of the Tlingit tribe and acquired multiple tattoos. Finally he returned to St. Petersburg via Kamchatka and Siberia. His voyage to North America earned him the nickname the American and a legendary celebrity due to the tales and gossip of his adventures. Tolstoy served as a prototype for a number of characters in Russian literature, including the duellist Zaretsky in Eugene Onegin by Aleksandr Pushkin. | An orangutan |
| Tryoshnikov | Alexey Tryoshnikov§ (1914–1991) geographer, oceanologist | Tryoshnikov participated in the 1948 Soviet expedition to the North Pole. In 1954–55, he headed the drifting ice station North Pole-3 in the Arctic. In 1956–58 he led the 2nd and in 1967–69 the 13th Soviet Antarctic Expedition, founding the Bellingshausen Station. He took part in the creation of the general atlas of the Antarctic and was the main editor of the atlas of the Arctic. He was the president of the Soviet Geographical Society in 1977–91 and the director of the Arctic and Antarctic Research Institute in 1960–81. Named in honor: 3339 Treshnikov (minor planet). | Antarctica |
| Tsivolko | Avgust Tsivolko‡ (1810–1839); Russian Navy officer, hydrographer | In 1832–34 Tsivolko made the first reliable maps of Novaya Zemlya's southern shores together with Pyotr Pakhtusov, and was the first to map the Matochkin Strait between the two main islands of the archipelago. In 1837 he commanded the schooner Krotov during Karl Baer's expedition to Novaya Zemlya. In 1838 he died from scurvy while mapping the northern and northeastern shores of Novaya Zemlya. | Matochkin Strait in Novaya Zemlya |
| Tsybikov | Gombojab Tsybikov! (1873–1930) anthropologist, ethnographer, statesmen | A native Buryat, Tsybikov traveled to Tibet in a group of Buryat and Kalmyk Buddhist pilgrims in 1899–1902. He became the first photographer of Tibet, taking pictures in secret. These pictures were widely celebrated throughout the world, printed by the National Geographic in the U. S. In 1904 Tsybikov presented his pictures to Dalai Lama in Urga, Mongolia. He published his travelogue with many valuable translations from Tibetan included. | Potala Palace in Lhasa, Tibet |

=== U ===
| Portrait | Person | Achievements | Image |
|---|---|---|---|
| Unkovsky | Ivan Unkovsky^ (1822–1886); Russian admiral | Unkovsky led an expedition on the frigate Pallada, together with Admiral Yevfimy Putyatin, through the Atlantic, Indian and Pacific Oceans to Japan in 1852–55. This expedition contributed many important discoveries in oceanography. Described in the book by Ivan Goncharov, who also sailed on the Pallada, it was a dangerous voyage since it coincided in time with the Crimean War between Russia and the Franco-British alliance. One of the results achieved was the Treaty of Shimoda with Japan. | Frigate Pallada |
| | Nikolay Urvantsev‡ (1893–1985) geologist | Urvantsev was among the discoverers of a coal basin and a copper-nickel ore region in Norilsk in 1919–22 and was among the founders of Norilsk town. In 1922 he found evidence of the disappeared Roald Amundsen's 1918 Arctic expedition crew members Peter Tessem and Paul Knutsen on the Kara Sea shore. In 1930–32 Urvantsev and Georgy Ushakov explored and completely mapped the Severnaya Zemlya and established that it was an archipelago, discovering a number or major islands. Urvantsev also explored Taymyr Peninsula and the Central Siberian Plateau. In 1933–34 aboard the Steamer Pravda Urvantsev led the first Arctic oil exploration expedition. | Severnaya Zemlya |
| Ushakov | Georgy Ushakov‡ (1901–1963) geographer | In 1926 Ushakov founded the first Soviet settlement on Wrangel Island. In 1930–32 Ushakov and Nikolay Urvantsev explored and completely mapped the Severnaya Zemlya and established that it was an archipelago, the last one on Earth to be explored. In 1935–36 Ushakov led the first Soviet high-latitude expedition on the icebreaker Sadko, examining the last unexplored areas in the northern Kara Sea and discovering Ushakov Island, the last unknown island in the Russian Arctic outside any archipelago. Ushakov died in Moscow, but was buried in Severnaya Zemlya. | Ushakov Island location |
| | Tatyana Ustinova* (1913–2009) geologist | In 1940 Ustinova came to Kronotsky Nature Reserve in Kamchatka. In 1941, with the help of the local guide Anysyfor Krupenin, she discovered the Valley of Geysers, the second largest concentration of geysers in the world. She researched the geysers until 1946 and gave names to the most notable of them. She requested in a testament that her ashes were to be buried in the Valley of Geysers. | Valley of Geysers in Kamchatka |

=== V ===
| Portrait | Person | Achievements | Image |
|---|---|---|---|
| | Merkury Vagin‡ (?–1712); Siberian Cossack, seafarer, merchant | In 1712, Vagin and his companion Yakov Permyakov crossed the Yana Bay over the ice and explored Bolshoy Lyakhovsky island (sited two years earlier by Permyakov), spotting Maly Lyakhovsky island from there. Thus they initiated the exploration of the large New Siberian archipelago. On the way back they were murdered by mutineering expedition members. | New Siberian Islands location |
| Vavilov | Nikolai Vavilov† (1887–1943) botanist and geneticist | In 1924–35 Vavilov was the director of the Institute of Plant Industry. He organized a series of botanical-agronomic expeditions, collected seeds from every corner of the globe, and created the world's largest collection of plant seeds in Leningrad. As a result of his explorations he identified the centres of origin of main cultivated plants. Named in honor: Vavilov Institute of Plant Industry, Vavilovian mimicry; 2862 Vavilov (minor planet), Vavilov crater (Moon) (named also after Vavilov's brother, physicist Sergey Vavilov). | Vavilov Centers: the origin of cultivated plants |
| Vilkitsky | Boris Vilkitsky‡ (1885–1961); Russian Navy captain, hydrographer | In 1913–15 Vilkitsky led the Arctic hydrographic expedition on the icebreakers Taimyr and Vaigach, exploring parts of the Northern Sea Route. In 1913, the expedition discovered Severnaya Zemlya, the last archipelago on Earth to be explored. Vilkitsky Island was also discovered, as well as Maly Taymyr and Starokadomsky Islands. In 1914–15, another Vilkitsky's expedition made the first through voyage from Vladivostok to Arkhangelsk, discovered Zhokhova Island and described the southern coast of Severnaya Zemlya. Named in honor: Vilkitsky Strait, Vilkitsky Island (Kara Sea), Vilkitsky Island (East Siberian Sea) | Severnaya Zemlya |
| Vize | Vladimir Vize‡ (1886–1954) oceanographer | In 1912–14 Vize took part in Georgiy Sedov's expedition to Novaya Zemlya and Franz Josef Land. In 1924 he studied the drift of Georgy Brusilov's ill-fated ship St. Anna, trapped on pack ice. As a result of this study he predicted the location of the yet unseen Vize Island, based on the analysis of ice movement in the Kara Sea. He took part in the first successful crossing of the Northern Sea Route in a single navigation on the icebreaker Sibiryakov in 1932. In 1938–40 he conducted scientific research on the ice-captured icebreaker Sedov, turned into a drifting ice station. Named in honor: Vize Island | Vize Island in the Kara Sea |
| Voronin | Vladimir Voronin‡ (1890–1952); Soviet Navy captain | In 1932 Voronin commanded the expedition of the icebreaker Sibiryakov which made the first successful crossing of the Northern Sea Route in a single navigation without wintering, in 65 days from Arkhangelsk to Yokohama in Japan. In 1933–34 he commanded the Chelyuskin steamship with the scientific expedition of Otto Schmidt aboard. The ship became ice-bound in the Chukchi Sea, but almost all the crew was rescued by planes from their camp on the ice. Named in honor: Voronina Island. | Icebreaker Sibiryakov |

=== W ===
| Portrait | Person | Achievements | Image |
|---|---|---|---|
| Wrangel | Ferdinand von Wrangel‡ (1797–1870); Russian admiral, colonial administrator | Ferdinand Wrangel took part in Vasily Golovnin's world cruise on the ship Kamchatka in 1817–19. In 1820–24 Wrangel sailed north of the Kolyma River and established that there was an open sea, not dry land, as was previously thought. Together with Fyodor Matyushkin and P. Kuzmin, he described the Medvyezhi Islands and the Arctic coastline from the Indigirka River to the Kolyuchinskaya Bay. After noticing swarms of birds flying north and questioning the native population, he determined that there must be an undiscovered island in the Arctic Ocean. Even though his search for it was unsuccessful the island was later named Wrangel Island. Wrangel led the circumnavigation on the ship Krotky in 1825–27. He was the governor of Russian America in 1829–35, the president of the Russian-American Company in 1840–49 and the Minister of the Navy in 1855–57. In 1845 he became one of the founders of the Russian Geographic Society. Named in honor: Wrangel Island (Chukchi Sea), Wrangell Island in Alexander Archipelago; Wrangell, Alaska; Wrangell Narrows Cape Wrangell, Mount Wrangell. | Medvyezhi Islands location Wrangel Island in the Arctic |

=== Y ===
| Portrait | Person | Achievements | Image |
|---|---|---|---|
| Yadrintsev | Nikolai Yadrintsev! (1842–1894) public figure, archaeologist, turkologist | In 1889 Yadrintsev located the remains of the medieval city Hara-Balgas and Genghis Khan's capital Karakorum in Mongolia. In the valley of the Orkhon River he discovered the Orkhon script of the ancient Türks on two petroglyphic monuments with runiform writing, later decoded by the Danish scientist Vilhelm Thomsen. In 1891 Yadrintsev together with Vasily Radlov found more monuments of Türkic runiform writing. | A stone turtle in Karakorum, Mongolia |
| Yermak | Yermak Timofeyevich* (1532/42–1585); Cossack ataman, folk hero | Around 1577, the merchants Stroganovs, who were the main colonisers of the Urals, hired Yermak to protect their lands from attacks by the Siberian Khan Kuchum. The Russians planned to attack Kuchum in his own land, and in 1581 Yermak penetrated into Siberia. After a few victories over the khan's army, Yermak's Cossacks defeated Kuchum's main forces on the Irtysh River in a 3-day Battle of Chuvash Cape in 1582, forcing them to retreat to the steppes. Thus Yermak captured the Siberia Khanate, including its capital Qashliq near modern Tobolsk. Kuchum was still strong and suddenly attacked Yermak in 1585 in the dead of night, killing most of his people. Yermak was wounded and tried to swim across the Wagay River (Irtysh's tributary), but drowned under the weight of his own chain mail armor. The Cossacks had to withdraw from Siberia completely, but thanks to Yermak's having explored the main river routes of West Siberian Plain, the Russians successfully recaptured all Yermak's conquests just a few years later. Named in honor: Icebreaker Yermak, Yermak Stone. | Yermak Timofeyevich the Conqueror of Siberia, lubok Ob'-Irtysh basin |

=== Z ===
| Portrait | Person | Achievements | Image |
|---|---|---|---|
| Zagoskin | Lavrenty Zagoskin^ (1808–1890); Russian Navy officer, naturalist | Commissioned by the Russian America Company, in 1842–44 Zagoskin traveled extensively in Alaska, covering more than 3300 miles. He explored and mapped the Yukon, Kuskokwim, Innoko and Koyukuk Rivers, and researched the native peoples and nature of the region. He published the first detailed description of the inner areas of Alaska. | Yukon River basin |
| Zavoyko | Vasily Zavoyko* (1809–1898); Russian admiral | In 1835–38 Zavoyko twice circumnavigated the globe. After 1840, during his service for the Russian-American Company in the Okhotsk Sea, Zavoyko explored the estuary of the Amur River. His reports led to further expeditions and ultimately the incorporation of Primorsky Krai into Russia. In 1854, at the time of Crimean War, Zavoyko led the successful defence of Kamchatka during the Siege of Petropavlovsk. He repelled the superior allied British-French forces and even captured the Union Jack. In 1855, making his way through the frozen seas and successfully avoiding the large enemy fleet, he supervised the transfer of the Russian Pacific Fleet from Petropavlovsk to Nikolayevsk-on-Amur. | Petropavlovsk-Kamchatsky |

== See also ==
- 1966 Soviet submarine global circumnavigation
- Arctic policy of Russia
- Category:Russian explorers
- First Russian circumnavigation
- Geography of Russia
- Great Northern Expedition
- List of explorers
- Northern Sea Route
- Russian Geographical Society
- Siberian River Routes
- Soviet Antarctic Expeditions
- Zemleprokhodtsy
