= Aldoma =

Rural locality in Ayano-Maysky District, Khabarovsk Krai, Russia

Coordinates: 56°47′N 138°26′E

Aldoma (Russian: Алдома) is a rural locality (an electric utility post) in Ayano-Maysky District of Khabarovsk Krai, Russia, located at the western entrance of Aldoma Bay in the western Sea of Okhotsk.
