= Dokuchayev =

Dokuchayev or Dokuchaev (feminine: Dokuchayeva or Dokuchaeva) is a Russian language surname. Notable people with the surname include:

- Artyom Dokuchayev (born 2001), Russian football player
- Aleksandr Dokuchayev, Russian early aircraft designer
- Vasily Dokuchaev (1846–1903), Russian soil scientist, geologist and geographer.
