= Aldoma Bay =

Small bay in Sea of Okhotsk, Russia

Coordinates: 56°48′N 138°30′E

Aldoma Bay (Russian: Zaliv Aldoma) is a small bay in the western Sea of Okhotsk. It is 8 km (5 mi) east to west and 14.5 km (9 mi) north to south. The Aldoma River flows into it from the west; to its east lies the Nurki Peninsula. It is considered the best anchorage in the northwestern part of the sea as it offers shelter from northeast winds.

== History ==
American and Russian whaleships hunted bowhead whales in the bay in the 1850s and 1860s. They also anchored in the bay to get wood and water.
