= Pyanda =

Pyanda Пянда
- Village
- Location within Arkhangelsk Oblast Location within Russia
- Coordinates: 62°56′N 42°34′E
- Country: Russia
- Region: Arkhangelsk Oblast
- District: Vinogradovsky District
- Time zone: UTC+3:00 (CET)

Pyanda (Russian: Пянда) is a rural locality (a village) in Bereznikovskoye Rural Settlement of Vinogradovsky District, Arkhangelsk Oblast, Russia. The population is 103 as of 2010.

== Geography ==
It is located on the Severnaya Dvina River.
