= Chkalov (disambiguation) =

Valery Chkalov (1904–1938) was a Soviet aircraft test pilot. His name was given to multiple objects in the former Soviet Union, including

- Chkalov (Tashkent Metro), a station of the Tashkent Metro, now Do'stlik
- Chkalov, Armenia, a town
- Chkalov, Kyrgyzstan, a village in Jalal-Abad Region, Kyrgyzstan
- Chkalov, Allaikhovsky District, Sakha Republic, a village in Russia
- Chkalov, Khangalassky District, Sakha Republic, a village in Russia
- Chkalov, Nyurbinsky District, Sakha Republic, a village in Russia
- Chkalov, former name of the town Buston, Sughd Region, Tajikistan
- Chkalov Island, in the Sea of Okhotsk
- Orenburg, named Chkalov from 1938 to 1957, a city in Russia and the capital of Orenburg Oblast
  - Orenburg Oblast, formerly Chkalov Oblast
- Chkalov, a Soviet Chapayev-class cruiser completed in 1950

== See also ==
- Chkalovka
- Chkalovsk (disambiguation)
- Chkalovsky (disambiguation)
- Valery Chkalov (film), a 1941 film
