= Polar route =

Flight path over Earth's axis

A map animation that shows the difference between the rhumb line and the great circle from Miami to Stockholm by warping the projection, showing that the great circle (shortest path) is curved towards the North Pole when mapped on the Mercator Projection.

A polar route is an aircraft route across the uninhabited polar ice cap regions. The term "polar route" was originally applied to great circle navigation routes between Europe and the west coast of North America which began to be routine in the 1950s. After several pioneering flights in the 1930s and 1940s, the first commercial polar route crossing was made by an SAS aircraft in 1954.

== The Arctic ==
=== Early years ===
In August 1935, the Soviet aviator Sigizmund Levanevsky and his two crewmen attempted a transpolar flight from Moscow, Russian SFSR, Soviet Union to San Francisco, California. The flight was aborted because of technical issues before they reached the North Pole. In 1936, Levanevsky and navigator Victor Levchenko completed a more-than-19,000-kilometre (11,800 mi) multistage flight from Los Angeles to Moscow in a Vultee V-1A floatplane, thus proving the possibility of an air route between the United States and the Soviet Union via the Bering Strait.

Another Soviet pilot Valery Chkalov and his crew were the first to fly non-stop from Europe to the American Pacific Coast. Their flight from Moscow to Vancouver, Washington, United States, via the North Pole on a Tupolev ANT-25 single-engine plane (June 18–20, 1937) took 63 hours to complete. The distance covered was 8,811 kilometres (5,475 mi). The following month, another Soviet crew led by Mikhail Gromov retraced the transpolar route, extending the distance to the world record-breaking 10,148 kilometers (6,302 miles), landing near San Jacinto, California, in the United States. In August of the same year, another Soviet crew led by Sigizmund Levanevsky started its long distance transpolar flight from Moscow to Fairbanks, Alaska; the radio communication with the aircraft broke off beyond the North Pole, and all subsequent search missions failed.

In October 1946, a modified B-29 flew 15,163 kilometres (9,422 mi) nonstop from Oahu, Hawaii, to Cairo, Egypt, in less than 40 hours, further proving the capability of routing airlines over the polar icecap.

=== The Cold War ===
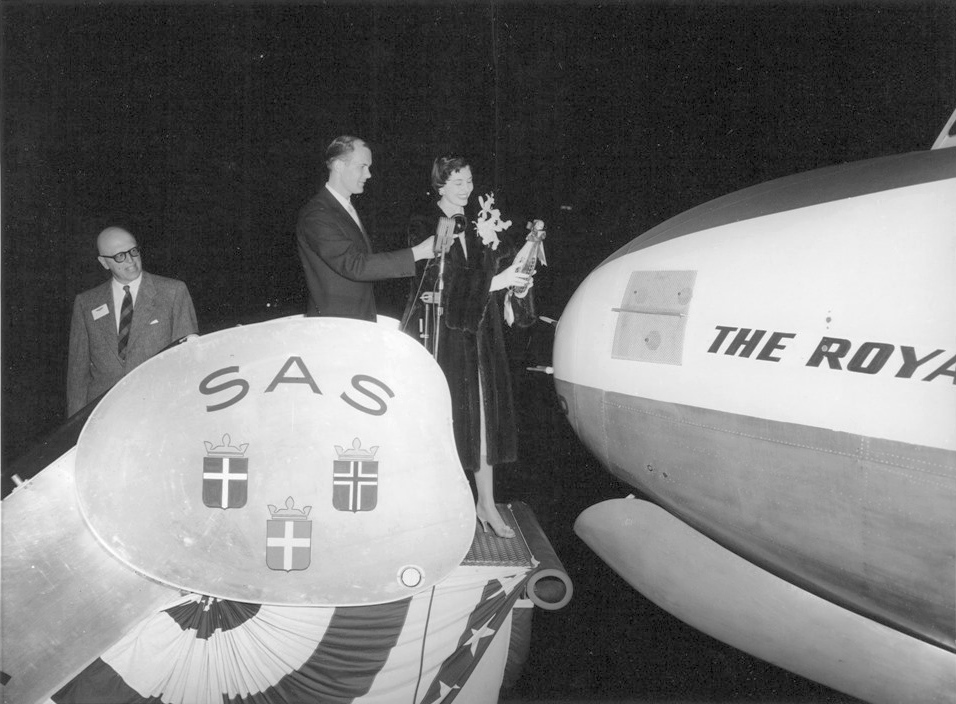
Leif Viking (LN-LMP) from SAS was the first aircraft to use the polar route for regular flights. Here Leif Viking becomes christened by Cyd Charisse on 18 November 1954.

Of the commercial airlines, SAS was first: their Douglas DC-6B flights between Los Angeles and Copenhagen, via Kangerlussuaq and Winnipeg, started on November 15, 1954. Canadian Pacific DC-6Bs started Vancouver–Amsterdam in 1955, then Pan Am and TWA started West Coast to Paris/London in 1957. SAS was first again, flying Europe to Tokyo via Anchorage with Douglas DC-7Cs in February 1957; Air France Lockheed L-1649 Starliner (which was the final version of the Lockheed Constellation) and KLM DC-7C aircraft followed in 1958. Air France was the first to operate commercial jet service over the North Pole on the routing Tokyo – Anchorage – Hamburg – Paris on 18 February 1960 using Boeing 707-328 Intercontinental equipment.

During the Cold War, the Arctic region was a buffer zone between the Soviet Union and North America. Civilian flights from Europe to the Asian Far East were prohibited from crossing the Eastern Bloc countries, Soviet Union or China, and had to fly either via the Middle East or across Arctic North America and Greenland with a refueling stop in Anchorage. These Cold War tracks extended from the northern Alaskan coast across Greenland to Europe. In 1978, Korean Air Lines Flight 902 operated with a Boeing 707 was shot down over the USSR by a Soviet Air Force fighter aircraft after the flight crew made gross navigational errors attempting to fly the assigned polar route.

In April 1967 Japan Air Lines (JAL) began an experimental service between Tokyo and Europe via Moscow across Siberia. This service used an Aeroflot Tupolev Tu-114, with one JAL flight crew and mixed JAL and Aeroflot cabin crew. However, Japan Air Lines dropped the service in 1969.

During the Cold War, Anchorage International Airport (ANC) in Alaska was a technical stop for a number of airlines flying the polar route between western Europe and Tokyo. According to the July 1, 1983 edition of the Worldwide Official Airline Guide (OAG), Air France, British Airways, Japan Air Lines (JAL), KLM Royal Dutch Airlines, Lufthansa, Sabena and Scandinavian Airlines (SAS) were all operating flights between Japan and western Europe which included a stop in Anchorage. Most of these international airlines were operating earlier model Boeing 747 aircraft on the route at this time, although Sabena and SAS were instead operating McDonnell Douglas DC-10-30 aircraft on their respective polar route services via Anchorage. U.S. based air carrier Western Airlines also flew a polar route during the early 1980s between London Gatwick Airport and Honolulu using DC-10-30 aircraft, with these flights also making a stop in Anchorage.

The only airline that still flies this type of route between Europe and Anchorage is Condor Airlines, seasonal service between Frankfurt (EDDF) and Anchorage. This will soon be joined by a flight by Eurowings, also from Frankfurt, using an Airbus A330.

Finnair was the first airline to fly non-stop via the polar route without a technical stop. This service began in 1983 and was flown with a McDonnell Douglas DC-10-30ER wide body jetliner between Tokyo and Helsinki.

United States Boeing B-52 aircraft operated in the Arctic Ocean region almost continuously in the 1960s as part of Operation Chrome Dome and in later decades as part of readiness exercises. A number of Western reconnaissance aircraft also conducted missions regularly along the Soviet Union's northern coast. Russian Long-Range Aviation now perform some of the same types of training flights, testing the readiness of Alaskan Command and Royal Canadian Air Force interceptors.

=== After the Cold War ===
Starting 1 May 1992, Aeroflot began regular flights between Moscow and San Francisco via Anchorage in both directions. These flights were operated by IL-62 aircraft which didn't have long enough range to fly nonstop between Moscow and San Francisco. The Moscow-Anchorage and Anchorage-Moscow legs were, at the time, the scheduled passenger airline routes that came closest to the North Pole. Flights between Moscow and Los Angeles, also via Anchorage and operated by IL-62 aircraft, were added in 1994. The Anchorage stop was eliminated later in May 1994 when the IL-62 was replaced on this route by the longer-range IL-96.

Immediately after the Cold War, a number of direct southern routes had opened up between Europe and Asia over the Black Sea and southern former Soviet republics across Afghanistan, and by the mid-1990s, over China. In Russia's eastern and Arctic regions there were significant problems with lack of English-speaking controllers, lack of radio facilities, poor radar coverage, poor ATC capacity, and a lack of funds. To solve these issues, RACGAT (Russian-American Coordinating Group for Air Traffic) was formed in 1993. By summer 1998, the Russian government worked through these problems and gave permission to open four cross-polar routes, named Polar 1, 2, 3 and 4. Additional routes were opened in subsequent years.

Cathay Pacific Flight 889 from New York John F. Kennedy International Airport, piloted by Captain Paul Horsting on 7 July 1998—the first arrival to the new Hong Kong International Airport at Chek Lap Kok west of Hong Kong—appears to be the first non-stop flight over the Arctic polar region and over Russian airspace by a non-Russian airline. It was the world's first nonstop transpolar flight from New York to Hong Kong, dubbed Polar One. It took 16 hours to complete, and it was and still is one of the longest flights that Cathay Pacific operates.

=== Current flight operations ===
The American Federal Aviation Administration now defines the North Polar area of operations as the area north of 78° north latitude, which is north of Alaska and most of Siberia.

Aircraft like the Boeing 747-400, 747-8, 777-200ER, 777-200LR, 777-300ER, 777X, 787-8, 787-9, and 787-10, as well as certain variants of the Airbus A330, A340, A350, and A380, with ranges of around 13,000 kilometres (8,100 mi; 7,000 nmi) or more, are required in order to travel the long distances nonstop between suitable airports.

Arctic polar routes are now common on airlines connecting Asian cities to North American cities. Emirates and Qatar Airways fly nonstop from Dubai and Doha to the US West Coast (San Francisco, Seattle, and Los Angeles), coming within a few degrees of latitude of the North Pole.

The 2022 Russian invasion of Ukraine led the United Kingdom, the United States and the European Union to ban Russian airlines from entering their airspace; they consequently received bans from operating in Russian airspace. (Note: Attributed to multiple references:) The bans have led airlines to avoid Russian airspace when flying to certain destinations, including Eastern Asian cities from the US and Europe and vice versa. One instance includes Japan Airlines, whose Heathrow Airport-Haneda Airport route now flies over the Outer Hebrides of Scotland, Iceland, Greenland, Canada, the Arctic Ocean, and Alaska, crossing the International Date Line in the process. (An alternative route from London to Tokyo flies south of Russia and over Turkey, Central Asia, Mongolia and China). While this route uses a Boeing 777, which can cover the route without refuelling, its flight time increased by an additional four hours because of the longer new route. The airspace bans also forced cargo airlines to change their course, with some changing their polar routes.

== Antarctica ==
Few airlines fly between cities having a great circle route over Antarctica. Hypothetically, flights between South Africa and New Zealand, or between either Western Australia or Western Southeast Asia and southern South America, would fly over Antarctica, but no airline currently operates such flights.

Flights between Australia and South America and between Australia and South Africa pass near the Antarctic coastline. Depending on the winds, the Qantas flight QFA63 from Sydney to Johannesburg – O. R. Tambo, or the return flight QFA64, sometimes flies over the Antarctic Circle to 71° latitude as well and allowing views of the ice sheet. Qantas QFA27 and QFA28 and LATAM LA809 and LA810 fly nonstop between Sydney and Santiago de Chile, the most southerly polar route. Depending on winds, this flight may reach 70° south latitude. From July 2012 until 2014, Aerolíneas Argentinas flew nonstop between Sydney and Buenos Aires. Previously, Qantas also operated QFA17 and QFA18 between Sydney and Buenos Aires. Nowadays, LATAM operates LAN804 and LAN805 between Melbourne, Australia, and Santiago, Chile, and Air New Zealand, until 2020, operated ANZ30 and ANZ31 between Auckland and Buenos Aires all with similarly south-running routes.

The polar route across the remote southern Pacific Ocean between South America and Oceania was pioneered by LAN Chile (now LATAM), with a special flight from Santiago to Sydney operated with a Boeing 707 in 1974, with a stop in Punta Arenas (Chile). Commercial flights began with Aerolíneas Argentinas, with service from Buenos Aires via Rio Gallegos to Auckland in the 1980s flown with a Boeing 747-200 aircraft. Aerolíneas Argentinas later extended its service to Sydney via Auckland and Rio Gallegos with return flights to Buenos Aires not making a stop in Rio Gallegos, but then ended its flights to New Zealand and Australia in 2014.

Previously, because of ETOPS limitations on twin-engined aircraft—the maximum distance the aircraft can operate from an airport for emergency landings—only four-engined aircraft such as the Boeing 747, Airbus A340, and Airbus A380 could operate routes near Antarctica. Twin-engined aircraft had to fly further north, closer to potential diversion airports; for example, when Virgin Australia operated their VA 15 and VA 16 flights between Melbourne and Johannesburg on twin-engined Boeing 777 aircraft with a 180-minute ETOPS rating, the flight was two hours longer than a Qantas flight from Sydney to Johannesburg. In 2015, government regulators approved Air New Zealand's twin-engined Boeing 777-200ER aircraft for a 330-minute ETOPS rating (i.e. its 777 aircraft can fly a maximum 330 minutes away from the nearest diversion airport), an increase from its previous 240-minute ETOPS rating, to operate their new route between Auckland and Buenos Aires-Ezeiza which ended in 2020. LATAM Airlines began their LAN800 and LAN801 nonstop flights between Santiago de Chile and Sydney via Auckland in April 2015 with twin-engined Boeing 787 aircraft with a 330-minute ETOPS rating. LATAM has announced a nonstop flight between Santiago de Chile and Melbourne (LAN804/LAN805) to begin in October 2017. In late 2019, LATAM began direct flights between Santiago and Sydney (LA802/LAN803) competing with the existing Qantas (QFA27/QFA28) flights on the same route.

The southernmost flight route with plausible airports would be between Buenos Aires and Perth. With a 175° (S) heading, the route's great circle exceeds 85° S and would be within 500 kilometres (310 mi) of the South Pole. Currently, no commercial airline operates this 12,600-kilometre (7,800 mi; 6,800 nmi) route. However, in February 2018, it was stated that Norwegian Air Argentina is considering this "less than 15 hours" trans-polar flight between South America and Southeast Asia, with a stop-over in Perth en route to Singapore. They will not fly over the South Pole, but around Antarctica taking advantage of the strong winds which circle that continent in an easterly direction. Hence, the "westbound" flight from Buenos Aires would actually travel south-east south of Cape Town, over the southern Indian Ocean and on to Perth, while the true "eastbound" flight would also head south-east south of Tasmania and New Zealand, over the South Pacific and on to South America. If this route becomes operational, a Buenos Aires – Singapore return flight would possibly be the fastest circumnavigation available with commercial airliners, although Perth – Buenos Aires return would be faster but without passing the Equator.

== Operational considerations ==
The FAA's policy letter Guidance for Polar Operations (March 5, 2001) outlines a number of special requirements for polar flight, which includes two cold-weather suits, special communication capability, designation of Arctic diversion airports and firm recovery plans for stranded passengers, and fuel freeze strategy and monitoring requirements.

Jet fuel freeze temperatures range between −40 and −50 °C (−40 and −58 °F). These temperatures are frequently encountered at cruise altitude throughout the world with no effect since the fuel retains heat from lower elevations, but the intense cold and extended duration of polar flights may cause fuel temperature to approach its freezing point. Jet A grade with a maximum freeze point of −40 °C (−40 °F) is used in the U.S., while Jet A1 grade with a maximum freeze point of −47 °C (−53 °F) is used elsewhere. Modern long-distance airliners are equipped to alert flight crew when fuel temperatures reach 3 °C (5.4 °F) above these levels. The crew must then change altitude, though in some cases due to the low stratosphere over polar regions and its inversion properties the air may actually be somewhat warmer at higher altitudes.

The alerts are typically set at 3 °C (5.4 °F) above the specified maximum freeze point. This provides a 3 °C (5.4 °F) safety margin from the solidification temperature. However, fuels produced at the refineries are often better than the spec values; for example, it is not uncommon to find Jet A fuels that have measured freeze point better (colder) than the specified maximum of −40 °C (−40 °F). In that way, the safety margin is even larger than 3 °C (5.4 °F). On the other hand, the temperature probe that delivers fuel temperature information to the flight deck is not located in the coldest part of the fuel tanks. The difference between the recorded and the coldest fuel temperature varies depending on a variety of factors, especially the circulation of fuel in the tanks and duration of cold soak. It is, therefore, prudent to have a safety margin.

For polar flights, FAA allows, under certain conditions, the measured freeze point be used instead of assuming the spec value in ASTM D1655. This gives the airlines more flexibility in flight planning.

== See also ==
- Longest flights
- Great circle
- Antarctica
