= Chkalov Transpolar flight =

The Chkalov transpolar flight was a non-stop flight made by Soviet aviators on 18–20 June 1937 in a ANT-25 aircraft. The crew consisted of commander Valery Chkalov, co-pilot Georgy Baydukov, and navigator Alexander Belyakov. It was the first non-stop flight from the Soviet Union to the United States.

== History ==
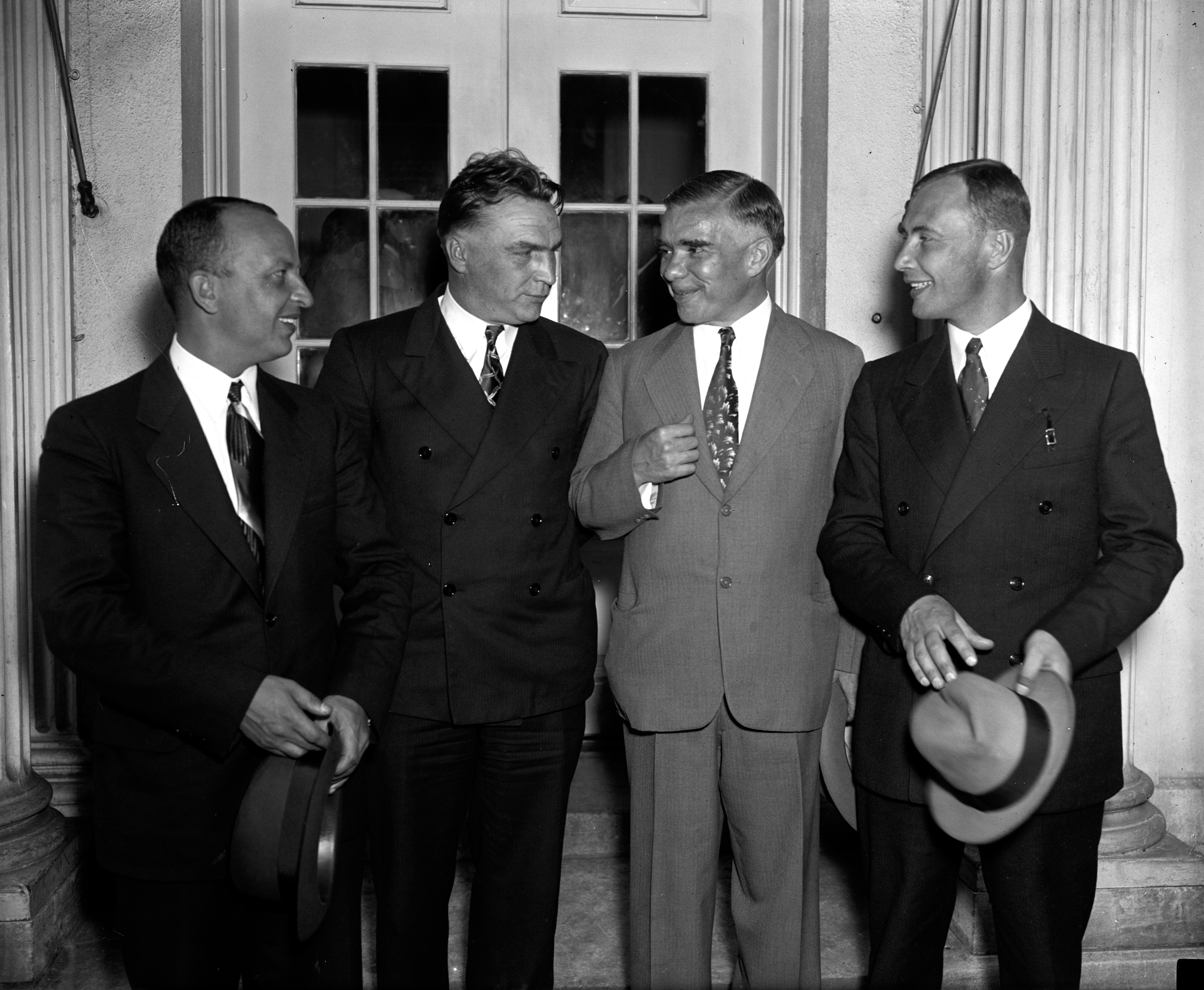
The flight crew with Soviet ambassador Alexander Troyanovsky (wearing the light-colored suit), 1937

Following the unsuccessful August 1935 attempt by Sigizmund Levanevsky, Georgy Baydukov and Viktor Levchenko to fly from the Soviet Union to the United States via the North Pole, which was abandoned because of an aircraft malfunction, the crew carried out a preparatory flight from Moscow to Udd Island in July 1936.

At 04:05 on 18 June 1937, Valery Chkalov, Georgy Baydukov and Alexander Belyakov took off in an ANT-25 from an airfield near Shchyolkovo, outside Moscow, and headed towards the North Pole. The flight was intended to break the world record for straight-line flight distance, which then stood at 9,104.7 km (5,657.4 mi).

The aircraft carried barographs sealed by official observers, whose readings were intended to verify that the plane had made no intermediate landings. The fuel-tank filler caps were also sealed to rule out undisclosed aerial refueling, a technique that was already in use at the time.

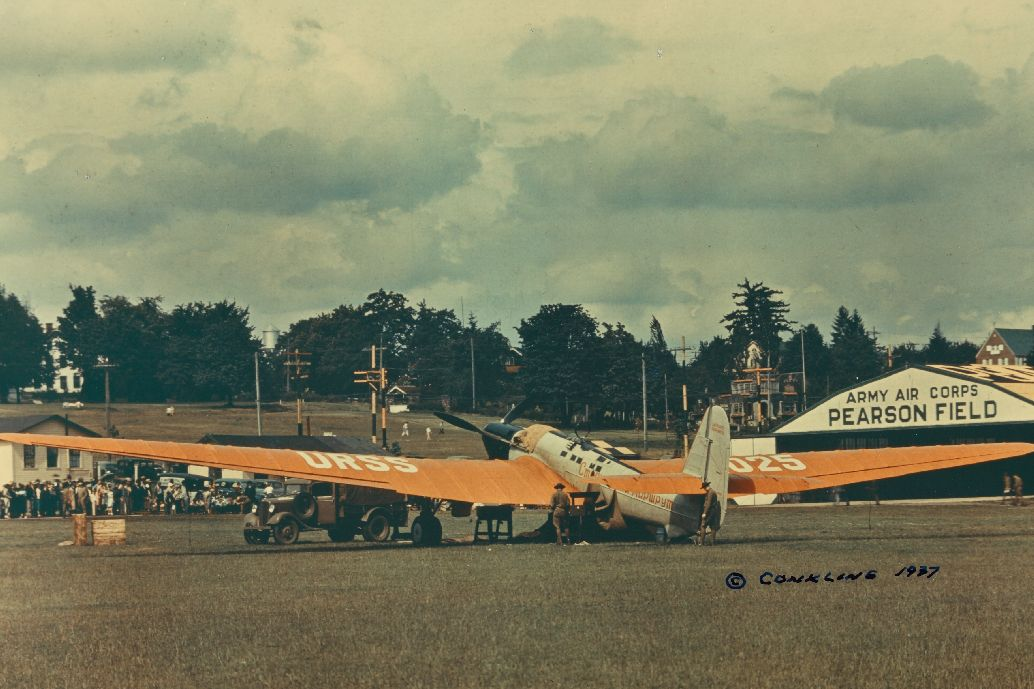
ANT-25 at Pearson Field, 1937

At 19:30 Moscow time on 20 June, the aircraft landed safely at Pearson Field, part of the Vancouver Barracks, in Vancouver, Washington, United States. After landing, only 100 kg (220 lb) of the original 6,100 kg (13,400 lb) fuel load remained.

According to Belyakov's calculations, the aircraft's actual ground track, “including all deviations and diversions”, was 9,130 km (5,670 mi). Under the rules of the Fédération Aéronautique Internationale, however, the distance credited for record purposes was the shortest distance over the Earth's surface between the take-off and landing points. The officially credited distance for the Moscow–North Pole–Vancouver flight was 8,582.96 km (5,333.20 mi).

The crew received a warm public welcome in the United States. Among those who greeted them were the Soviet ambassador, Alexander Troyanovsky, and General George C. Marshall, who was then stationed at Vancouver Barracks and hosted the crew at his home. In Washington, D.C., the aviators were received by President Franklin D. Roosevelt in the Oval Office of the White House. The crew also met the noted Arctic explorer Vilhjalmur Stefansson.

The crew returned from the United States to Europe aboard the ocean liner Normandie.

Later in 1937, the ANT-25 used for the flight was dismantled and transported from Le Havre to Leningrad aboard the Soviet cargo ship Kooperatsiya. One account suggests that Normandie had previously carried the dismantled aircraft from the United States to Le Havre.

American polar explorer and aviator Richard E. Byrd later praised the transpolar flights by the crews of Valery Chkalov and Mikhail Gromov, describing them as important achievements that could contribute to improved Soviet–American relations.

A trapezoidal monument dedicated to the flight stands near Pearson Air Museum at Fort Vancouver National Historic Site.

== Coverage in the Soviet press ==
The flight did not achieve its original objective of setting a world distance record. The 1933 French record remained unbeaten until July 1937, when Mikhail Gromov's crew surpassed it during the Moscow–North Pole–San Jacinto flight.

Contemporary Soviet coverage generally did not discuss the credited distance or the failure to break the record. Instead, the flight was presented as a demonstration of the feasibility of a future air route between the Soviet Union and the United States. On 21 June, Soviet Air Force commander Yakov Alksnis wrote in Pravda that the purpose had been to test the possibility of regular communications along the shortest route between the two countries, across the North Pole.

The Soviet press emphasized that it was the first intercontinental flight across the North Pole and portrayed it as a major historical and technological achievement. Mikhail Vodopyanov described it as proof that an air route to North America had been opened. A Pravda editorial similarly celebrated the crew as national heroes and presented the flight as evidence of Soviet technological progress.

== Awards ==
All three crew members were awarded the Order of the Red Banner for the flight.

== See also ==
- Transpolar flight of Gromov, Yumashev and Danilin
- Non-stop flight from Moscow to Udd Island
