= Shchastya Bay =

Bay in the Nikolayevsky District of Khabarovsk Krai, Russian Federation

- Залив Счастья (Russian)
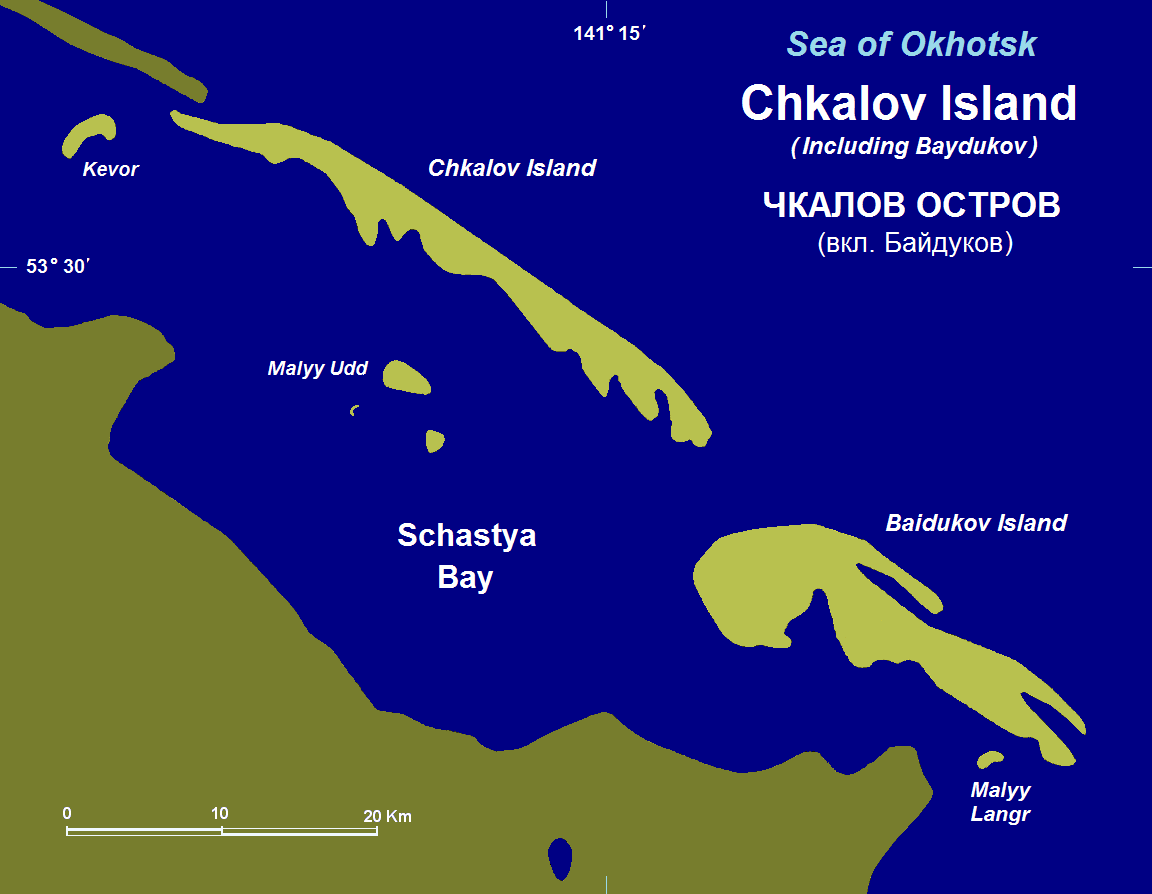
- Location of Shchastya Bay south and west of Chkalov and Baydukov Islands

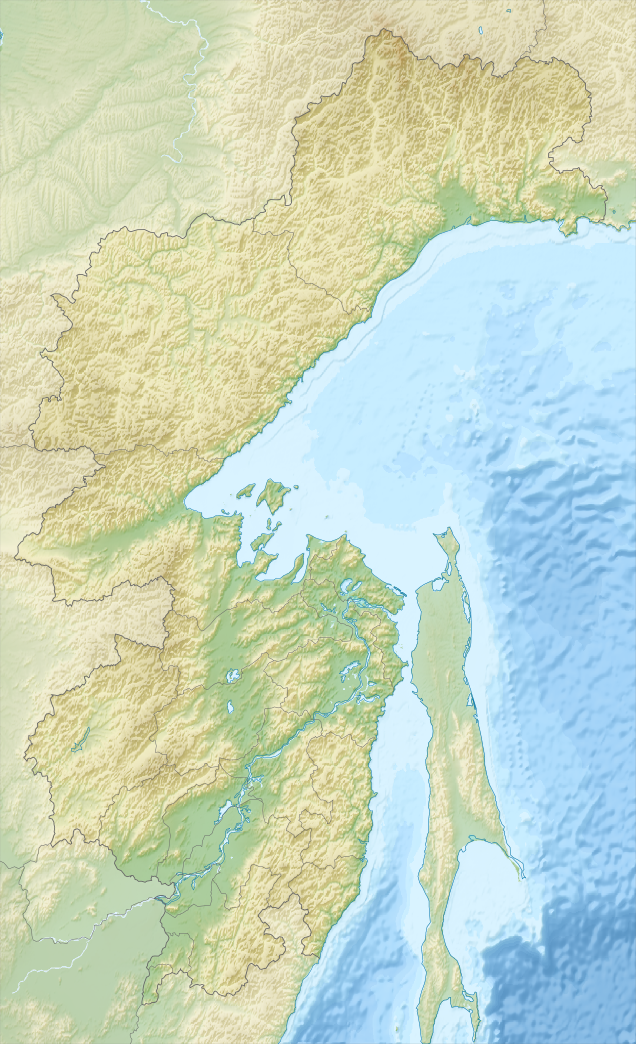
- Location in Khabarovsk Krai
- Location: Russian Far East
- Coordinates: 53°24′N 141°08′E
- Ocean/sea sources: Sea of Okhotsk
- Basin countries: Russia
- Max. length: 7 km (4.3 mi)
- Max. width: 37 km (23 mi)
- Average depth: 3 m (9.8 ft)

Shchastya Bay (Russian: Залив Счастья; Zaliv Shchast'ya, meaning 'Bay of Happiness') is a bay in the Nikolayevsky District of Khabarovsk Krai, Russian Federation.

== Geography ==
Shchastya Bay is a long coastal lagoon on the western side of the Sea of Okhotsk facing the northwestern tip of Sakhalin. It is limited in the north by the Petrovskaya Kosa landspit, Chkalov Island and Baydukov Island.

The bay is shallow, with many shoals; it is about 40 km wide and has an average length of 7 km. There are three passes, the broadest of which is between Chkalov and Baydukov Islands.

== History ==
The Shchastya Bay area was populated by Russians who built winter settlements in the area in centuries past. Nowadays there are three settlements around Shchastya Bay: Men'shikovo, Vlas'evo and Khaburs. Administratively this lagoon belongs to the Khabarovsk Krai of the Russian Federation.

This bay became briefly the center of attention of the press in 1936 when Soviet pilot Valery Pavlovich Chkalov flew on an Antonov ANT-25 plane from Moscow through Franz Joseph Land, Severnaya Zemlya, Petropavlovsk-Kamchatsky and Khabarovsk. The plane landed 56 hours and 20 minutes later in Udd Island (now Chkalov Island) after having covered 9,374 km.

Shchastya Bay is the title of a 1987 Soviet movie, "Zaliv Shchastya".

== Ecology ==
This lagoon is a bird sanctuary and a great variety of shorebirds occur in the area.
