= Valery Chkalov (film) =

Valery Chkalov (Валерий Чкалов)
- Directed by: Mikhail Kalatozov
- Starring: Vladimir Belokurov; Mikheil Gelovani
- Cinematography: Aleksandr Gintsburg
- Edited by: A. Goldburg, D. Lander
- Production company: Lenfilm
- Release date: 1941
- Running time: 89 minutes
- Country: Soviet Union
- Language: Russian

Valery Chkalov (Russian: Валерий Чкалов, UK title - The Red Flyer, United States title - Wings of Victory) is a Soviet biopic about the life of Valery Chkalov, directed by Mikhail Kalatozov. The screenplay was written by Georgy Baidukov, Boris Chirskov and Dmitri Tarasov. The film was produced by Lenfilm and distributed in the United States by Artkino Pictures (1941), and later by Top1Video (1999).

== Plot ==
Valery Chkalov, the best military pilot, grows bored of flying within the constraints of regulations and instructions. He seeks thrilling maneuvers, such as steep turns, low-altitude flights, and aerobatic stunts. When his commander, Alyoshin (known as Batya), speaks with Chkalov's beloved on a bridge over the Neva River in Leningrad, seeking her help to rein in the reckless pilot, Chkalov misinterprets their conversation and boldly flies his plane under the bridge. As a result, he is dismissed from the service.

For several years, the great pilot works as a cargo pilot, spending time with his family (his beloved eventually becomes his wife) and raising their children. One day, Batya visits him, understanding that Chkalov's reckless behavior is not pointless but a pursuit of maximum flying skills in preparation for potential warfare. Batya invites Chkalov to test aircraft at an aviation factory, where young designer Mukhine (based on real-life designer Nikolai Polikarpov, whose planes Chkalov had tested) is developing a new model of monoplane fighter. Chkalov proves the merits of Mukhine's aircraft during a demonstration aerial duel at an airshow. Although he struggles to land the plane due to a malfunctioning landing gear, Chkalov refuses to eject and, through skilled aerobatics, manages to get the gear to function. His persistence impresses the chief spectator of the parade—Joseph Stalin. The leader advises Chkalov that one should not risk one's life recklessly, but that such risks should be justified by a great purpose.

Chkalov reconsiders the meaning of his life and work. Meanwhile, he loses his close friend, Batya, who dies from a fatal wound sustained during an experimental flight, where he followed instructions to the detriment of his safety.

Finally, Chkalov is entrusted with a monumental task—an intercontinental flight over the Arctic to the United States. Leading a crew of three pilots, he courageously flies over the North Pole and, despite numerous challenges, successfully lands in America. Chkalov greets the gathered American crowd, signs autographs, and tells an American journalist about the size of his wealth—not in dollars, but in the 170 million Soviet people who support him.

The film concludes with a conversation between Chkalov and his loyal mechanic, Pal Palych, in front of a new, powerful aircraft. The celebrated pilot shares his hopes for the future—to fly to places only human thought can reach.

== Cast ==
- Vladimir Belokurov as Valery Chkalov
- Mikheil Gelovani as Joseph Stalin
- Semyon Mezhinsky as Sergo Ordzhonikidze
- Kseniya Tarasova as Olga Chkalova
- Vasili Vanin as Pasha Palic
- Serafima Birman
- Pyotr Berezov as Georgiy Baidukov
- Boris Zhukovsky as Cmdr. Alyoshin
- Fyodor Bogdanov as Grandfather
- Irina Zarubina
- Sergei Yarov as Alexander Belyakov
- I. Smyslovsky
- Mikhail Kalatozov
- Boris Andreyev
- Arkady Raikin as American journalist
