= Chkalov Transpolar Flight Monument =

Monument in Vancouver, Washington, U.S.

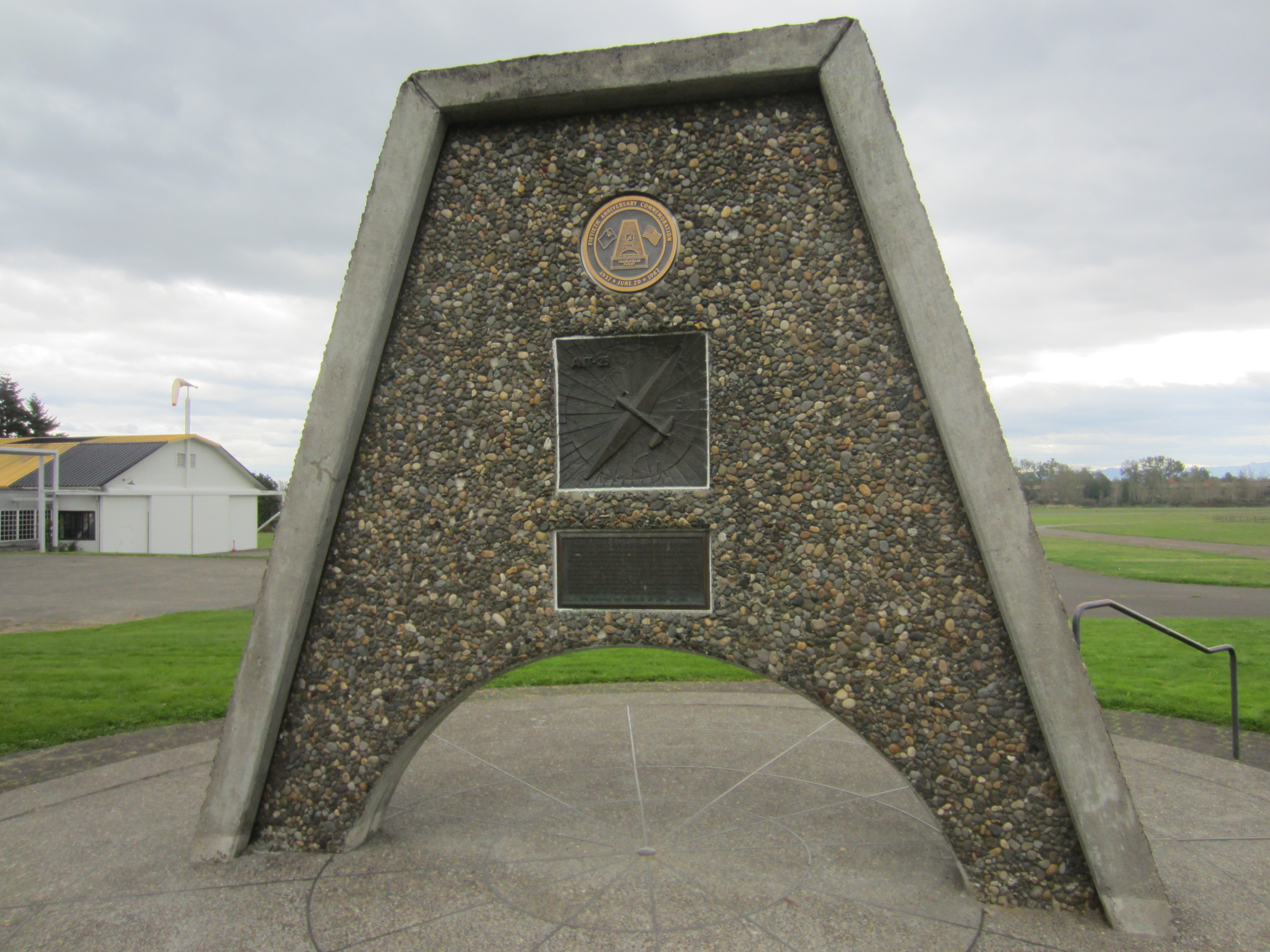
- The monument in 2020
- Location: Pearson Air Museum, Fort Vancouver National Historic Site, Vancouver, Washington, U.S.
- Coordinates: 45°37′27.1″N 122°39′25.6″W

The Chkalov Transpolar Flight Monument, or simply Chkalov Monument, is a monument located at Pearson Field, in Vancouver, Washington near the Fort Vancouver National Historic Site. The monument commemorates the 1937 first transpolar flight, and was dedicated on June 20, 1975 with copilot Georgy Baidukov and navigator Alexander Belyakov in attendance; pilot Valery Chkalov was killed during a test flight in 1938, the year after the flight. The monument was the first ever erected in the United States to commemorate an achievement of the Soviet Union. The monument was originally erected on the south side of the airfield, along Washington State Route 14. When SR 14 was widened and rebuilt in the 1980s, the monument was moved to its current location on the north side of the field, adjacent to the Pearson Air Museum on East 5th Street.

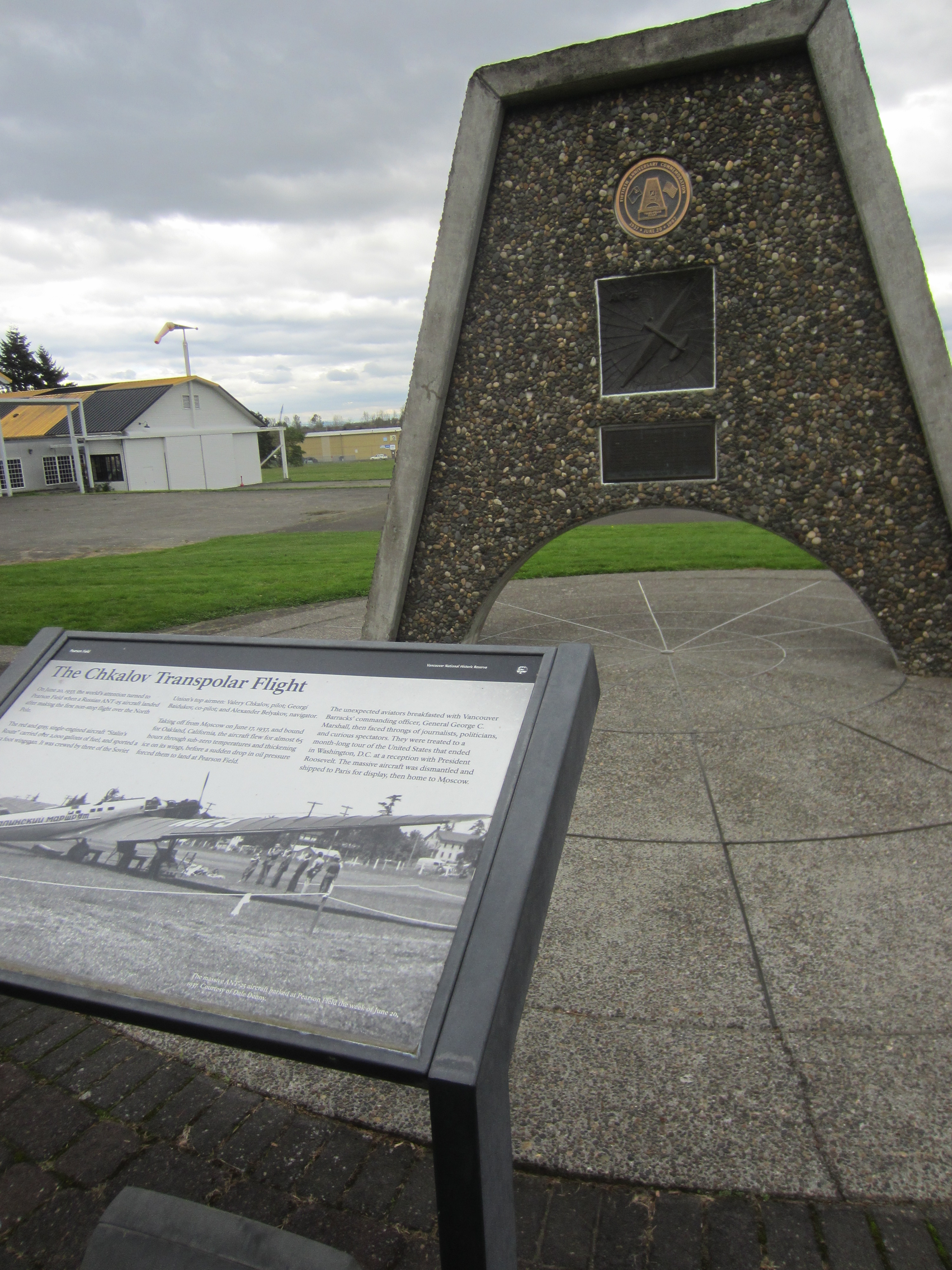

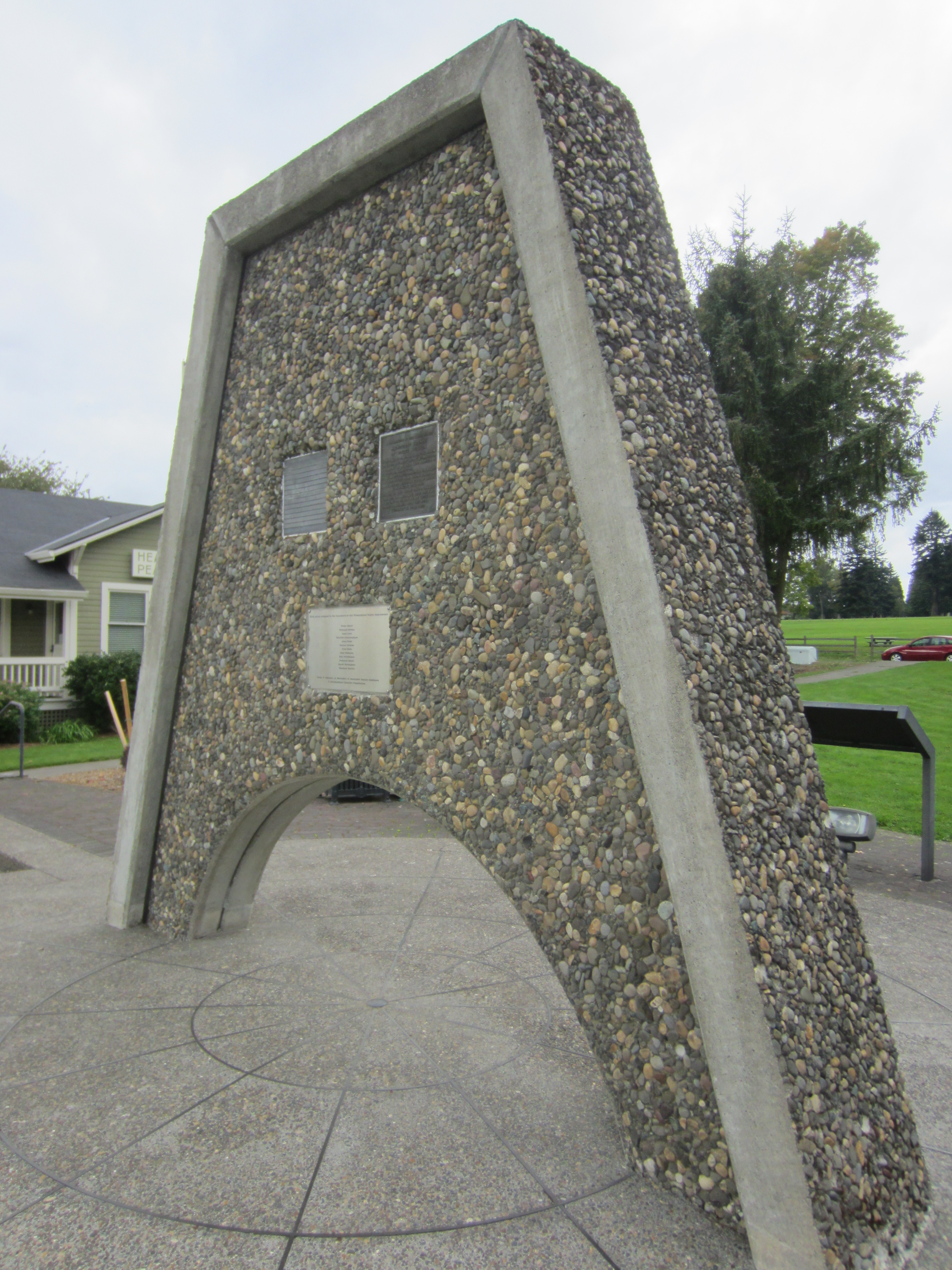
