= Chkalovsky =

Chkalovsky (masculine), Chkalovskaya (feminine), or Chkalovskoye (neuter) may refer to:

- Chkalovsky District, name of several districts and city districts in Russia
- Chkalovsky (air base), an airport near Moscow serving the Russian space program
- Chkalovsky (rural locality) (Chkalovskaya, Chkalovskoye), name of several rural localities in Russia
- Chkalovskaya metro station (disambiguation), name of several metro stations in Russia
- Chkalovskoye Municipal Okrug, a municipal okrug of Petrogradsky District of St. Petersburg, Russia

== See also ==
- Chkalov (disambiguation)
- Chkalovsk (disambiguation)
- Valery Chkalov
