= Alexander Pearson Jr. =

American aviator (1895-1924)

- Born: November 12, 1895; Sterling, Kansas, U.S.
- Died: September 2, 1924 (aged 28); Fairfield, Ohio, U.S.
- Cause of death: Aircrash
- Resting place: Section D Site 2795, Arlington National Cemetery
- Education: University of Oregon, Engineering School, McCook Field
- Occupation: Aviator
- Employer: United States Army
- Title: First Lieutenant

Lieutenant Alexander Pearson Jr. (November 12, 1895 – September 2, 1924) was a prominent aviation figure in the Army Air Service from 1919 until his death in 1924. He is credited with setting the world speed record in March 1923. Pearson Field in Vancouver, Washington was dedicated in his honor on by order of the Secretary of War Major General John L. Hines on May 7, 1925.

== Biography ==
Pearson was born in Sterling, Kansas on November 12, 1895 and graduated high school in Hutchinson, Kansas. Pearson then moved to Eugene, Oregon where he enrolled at the University of Oregon.

Pearson joined the Army when the United States entered the war in 1917 and later in served the Air Service. .

Pearson served as an Army test pilot and held numerous flight records, including the transcontinental speed record. He lost his life while preparing for the Pulitzer race in Ohio. Flying the Curtiss R-8, a wing strut failed as Pearson attempted to recover from a dive and his plane crashed into the ground at 260 miles per hour (418 km/h) near Fairfield, Ohio, killing him instantly.

== Legacy ==
Pearson Field was officially dedicated on September 16, 1925, and to mark the occasion Lt. Oakley G. Kelly organized a large air show. Fifty-six aircraft from across the West converged on Pearson Field, providing the audience of 20,000 a spectacular show of precision flying and parachute drops.

Alexander Pearson Marker located at 45°37.455′N 122°39.437′W. Marker is in Vancouver, Washington, in Clark County. Marker is on E. 5th Street, on the left when traveling west. Marker is at the Pearson Air Museum Headquarters Building. Marker created by A. H. Clark in 1938. Made by L. C. Blouhard, J. F. Mahaney.
