= Pearson Field Education Center =

Education Center on Pearson Field
- Established: 2013
- Location: 201B E Reserve St, Vancouver, WA 98661
- Coordinates: 45.6225°N 122.6545°W
- Type: Science, technology, engineering, and mathematics
- Director: Julia Cannell
- Public transit access: C-Tran
- Website: Pearson Field Education Center

The Education Center on Pearson Field, formerly Pearson Field Education Center (PFEC) is an educational facility for young people ages kindergarten through 12th grade (K-12). It is located in Pearson Field, Vancouver, Washington. The center provides programs in aviation-based science, technology, engineering, and math (STEM).

== History ==
PFEC was founded during the spring of 2013 as a program of the Fort Vancouver National Trust.

Pearson Field is the oldest continuously operating airfield in the Pacific Northwest and one of the two oldest continuously operating airfields in the United States. In 2012, it received recognition as an American Institute of Aeronautics and Astronautics Historic Aerospace Site. In 1905, Pearson Field was used as a spruce mill for aircraft parts during WWI by the US Army. The site was home to regular army flights after it was established as a forest patrol base in 1921. Reserve fliers from the region began training with the 321st Observation Squadron from 1923 until the squadron was placed on active service in 1941. In 1937, first non-stop transpolar flight by the Russian ANT-25 touched down on Pearson Field due to an engine oil leak.

In September 2022, The Education Center on Pearson Field began operation under Airway Science for Kids.

== Programs ==
Programs include school-age field trips, educational outreach, scout merit badge programs, open cockpit day, college and career fairs, and aviation connected summer camps. Annually updated summer camp options have included model rocketry builds and launches, model R/C aircraft builds and flights, model glider builds and flights, and supervised flight time in an aircraft.

Regular celebrations of historic Pearson aviators and aviatrixes including Leah Hing, Edith "Eddie" Foltz Sterns and others are held to foster an empowering and motivational spirit amongst young people participating in PFEC programs.

== Facility ==
Programs of PFEC are delivered in a 5,700 square foot hangar, on adjacent outdoor grass areas, on and above Pearson Field, on nearby Officers Row, in classrooms of schools in the area, and at partner organizations. The PFEC hangar includes: historic aircraft and artifacts supporting curriculum, a simulator lab, hands-on skill building, tool and materials areas, and a classroom.

Summer camp programs may include tours of the Western Antique Aeroplane & Automobile Museum in Hood River, Oregon.
