= Chkalovsky District =

Chkalovsky District is the name of several districts in Russia. The districts are generally named for Valery Chkalov, a Soviet aircraft test pilot.

== City divisions ==
- Chkalovsky City District, Yekaterinburg, a city district of Yekaterinburg, the administrative center of Sverdlovsk Oblast
Location of Yekaterinburg in Russia

== Historical districts ==
- Chkalovsky District, Nizhny Novgorod Oblast (1936–2015), a former district of Nizhny Novgorod Oblast

== See also ==
- Chkalovsky (disambiguation)
