= Aleksandr Belyakov (navigator) =

Soviet lieutenant general (1897–1982)

Alexander Belyakov
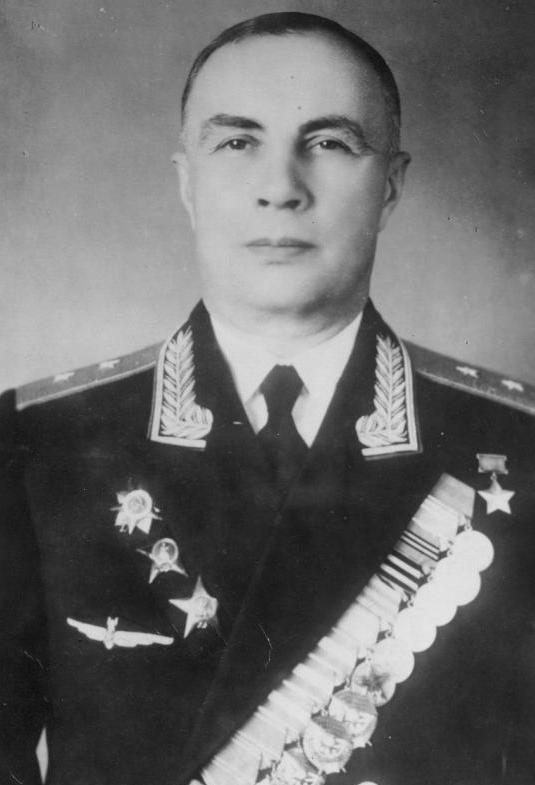
- Born: Alexander Vasilyevich Belyakov; 21 December 1897; Bezzubovo, Bogorodsky Uyezd, Moscow Governorate, Russian Empire
- Died: 28 October 1982 (aged 85); Moscow, Russian SFSR, Soviet Union
- Military career
- Allegiance: Russian Empire; Soviet Russia; Soviet Union
- Branch: Imperial Russian Army; Red Army; Soviet Air Force
- Rank: Lieutenant-general
- Conflicts: World War I; Russian Civil War; World War II; Battle of Berlin
- Awards: Hero of the Soviet Union; Order of Lenin (2); Order of the Red Banner (3); Order of the Patriotic War, 1st class Order of the Red Banner of Labour; Order of the Red Star (3)
- Other work: Deputy of the Supreme Soviet of the Soviet Union (1937-1946) Professor, Moscow Institute of Physics and Technology

Alexander Vasilyevich Belyakov (Russian: Алекса́ндр Васи́льевич Беляко́в; 21 December 1897 [O.S. 9 December] – 28 November 1982) was a Soviet flight navigator who, together with command pilot Valery Chkalov and co-pilot Georgy Baydukov, set a record for the longest uninterrupted flight in 1936 and made the first non-stop flight across the North Pole, flying from Moscow to Vancouver, Washington.

He was elected to the Supreme Soviet of the Soviet Union and served as a lieutenant general of the Soviet Air Forces.

== Biography ==
=== Early life and training ===
Alexander Belyakov was born in 1897 in the village of Bezzubovo, Moscow Governorate (now Orekhovo-Zuyevsky District, Moscow Oblast) and grew up in Ryazan. He studied forestry in 1915-1916 after finishing his gymnasium studies and began serving in the infantry of the Imperial Russian Army in 1916.

He fought in the Soviet Russian Red Army's 25th Rifle Division during the Russian Civil War. He graduated from the Moscow Aerophotogrammetry School of the Red Air Fleet in 1921 and subsequently taught there and at the A.E.Zhukovsky Air Force Academy until 1935.

He graduated from the Kachinskoye Military Aviation School for Pilots and joined the Communist Party in 1936.

=== 1930s records ===
==== Flight to Udd Island ====
Belyakov joined commanding pilot Valery Chkalov and co-pilot Georgy Baydukov to navigate a Tupolev ANT-25 plane on a non-stop flight from Moscow to Udd Island (now Chkalov Island) off the coast of Kamchatka in a 56-hour flight on 20–22 July 1936. Their flight, covering more than 9,374 kilometers across nearly the entire width of the Union of Soviet Socialist Republics, set a record for the longest non-stop flight, preparing the way for a flight across the North Pole.

The three aviation heroes were awarded the title Hero of the Soviet Union and decorated with the Order of Lenin for the record-breaking flight.

==== Across the North Pole to America ====
Flying the same ANT-25 plane, Chkalov, Baydukov, and Belyakov completed an 8,504-kilometer flight from Moscow to the United States, crossing the North Pole and landing in Vancouver, Washington. The fliers set another record by performing the first non-stop polar flight and establishing a new route from the Soviet Union to the United States.

=== Later career ===
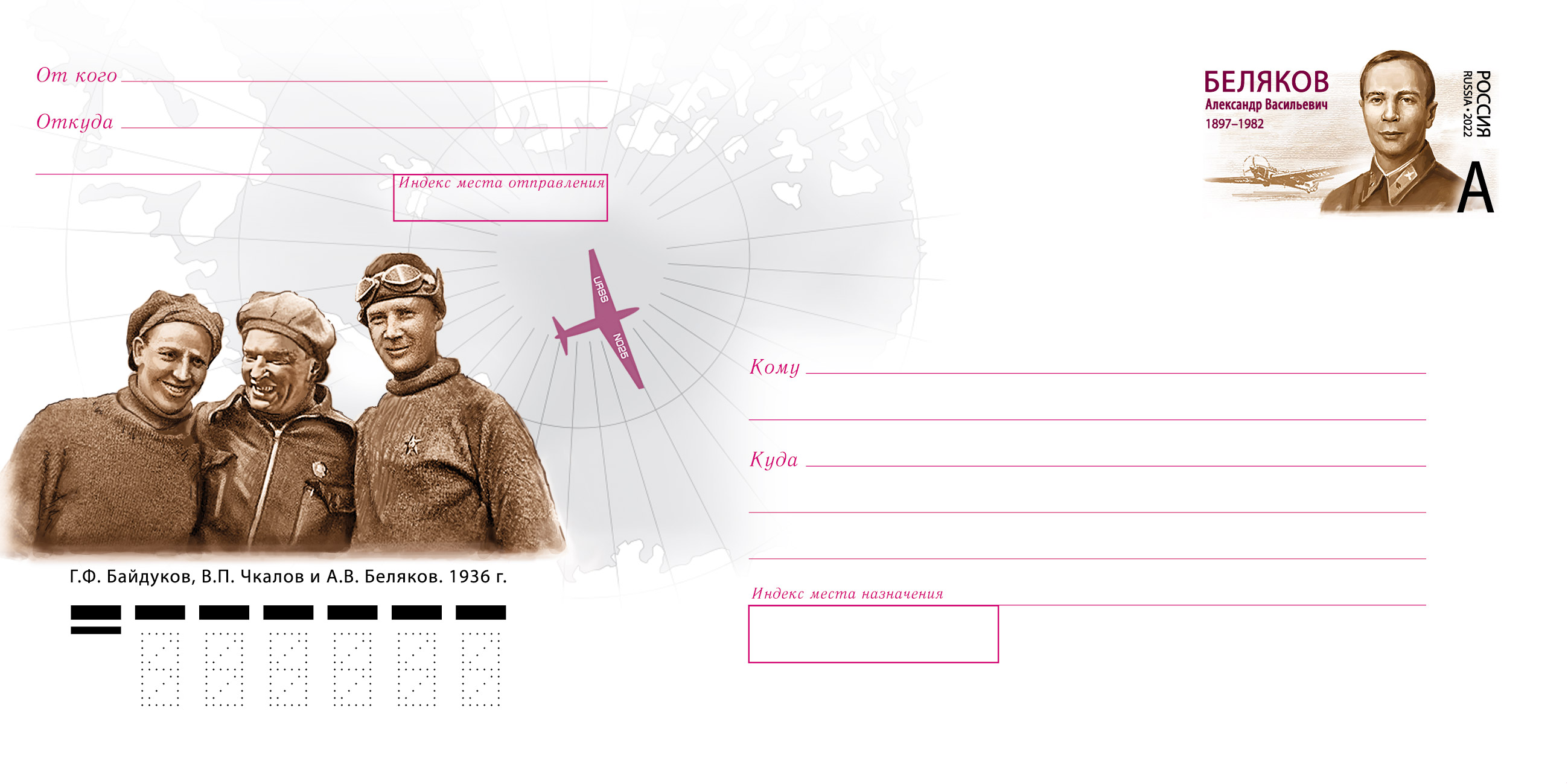
Top-right: Belyakov; bottom-left: Valery Chkalov (center) with Georgy Baydukov (left) and Belyakov (right) on a Soviet postal cover issued to commemorate their non-stop flight to the United States in 1937.

The domestic and international press coverage of the Trans-Polar flight immediately catapulted to worldwide fame and ultimate acclaim for the three aviators, who had already been regarded as Soviet heroes after their successful flight to Udd Island in 1936. The aviators' portraits were featured on a postage stamp issued to commemorate the flight. The three were elected to the Supreme Soviet of the Soviet Union in 1937.

Alexander Belyakov was appointed head of the Ryazan Supreme School of Navigators of the Soviet Air Force in the 1940s and took part in the fighting against Nazi Germany as the 16th Air Army's chief navigator during the Battle of Berlin. Promoted to lieutenant-general during the war, he continued to serve in the Air Force and became a professor at the Moscow Institute of Physics and Technology upon his retirement from the service in 1960.

He joined Georgy Baydukov to attend the unveiling of a Vancouver monument commemorating their transpolar flight in 1975.

Belyakov died in Moscow on 28 November 1982 and was interred at Moscow's Novodevichy Cemetery.

== Honors and legacy ==
Aside from the Order of Lenin awarded together with the title Hero of the Soviet Union on 24 July 1936 (subsequently Gold Star No. 9 was also added), Belyakov was awarded another Lenin Order and was a recipient of three Orders of the Red Banner, an Order of the Patriotic War 1st class, Order of the Red Banner of Labour twice, three Orders of the Red Star, and additional medals.

He received the degree of Doctor of Geography in 1938.

An island off Kamchatka in the Sea of Okhotsk was given the name Belyakov Island (Ostrov Belyakova) in honor of Alexander Belyakov.
