= Chkalovsk =

Chkalovsk may refer to:

- Chkalovsk, Russia, a town in Chkalovsky District of Nizhny Novgorod Oblast, Russia
- Chkalovsk Urban Okrug, a municipal formation into which the town of oblast significance of Chkalovsk in Nizhny Novgorod Oblast, Russia is incorporated
- Chkalovsk Urban Settlement, a former municipal formation into which the former town of district significance of Chkalovsk in former Chkalovsky District of Nizhny Novgorod Oblast, Russia was incorporated
- Chkalovsk, former name of Buston, a town in Sughd Province, Tajikistan
- Chkalovsk Microdistrict, a part of the city of Kaliningrad, Russia
- Kaliningrad Chkalovsk, a naval air base in Kaliningrad Oblast, Russia
- Omsk Chkalovsk, an airport in Omsk, Russia

== See also ==
- Chkalov (disambiguation)
- Chkalovsky (disambiguation)
