= Tupolev DB-1 =

DB-1
- Side view of the precursor, the first ANT-25.

General information
- Type: Long-range bomber
- National origin: Soviet Union
- Manufacturer: Tupolev
- Primary user: Soviet Air Forces
- Number built: 18

History
- First flight: 1934
- Retired: 1937
- Developed from: Tupolev ANT-25

The Tupolev DB-1 (ANT-36) was a Soviet long-range bomber developed in the 1930s. It was developed from the Tupolev ANT-25 distance record-breaking aircraft. Development was prolonged and it was recognized as obsolete by the time it was in production. Only eighteen were built and all were withdrawn from service in 1937.

== Development ==
The possibilities of exchanging some of the fuel of the ANT-25 for bombs and/or cameras was recognized early in its development, and the Soviet Air Forces (VVS) issued a requirement for an aircraft to carry 1,000 kg (2,200 lb) over an operational radius of 2,000 km (1,200 mi) at a speed of 200 km/h (120 mph). The Tupolev Design Bureau had prepared a design and built a mockup by August 1933, using the internal designation of ANT-36, and the VVS approved both. Series production of a first batch of 24, out of a planned total of 50, was initiated in the new Factory No. 18 at Voronezh in 1934, but only 18 were built before the program was canceled.

The airframe, engine and crew compartments were retained from the ANT-25 almost unchanged, although the co-pilot's and navigator's positions were each given one 7.62 mm (0.3 in) DA machine gun for defense. The DB-1 (long-range bomber model 1), as it was designated in VVS service, was given a smooth skin and a bomb bay was built in the wing center section that carried ten 100 kg (220 lb) FAB-100 bombs nose-up. An AFA-14 camera was mounted in the rear cockpit, but other cameras could be carried instead of the bombs.

== Operational history ==
The DB-1's first flight was in 1934, but the first production aircraft was not tested until late 1935. It was rejected by the VVS because of poor manufacturing quality. Only ten aircraft were placed into service which equipped one regiment based near the factory at Voronezh. All of these were retired in 1937.

The remainder of these aircraft were used for a variety of tasks. One was fitted with the first flight-cleared Charomskii AN-1 diesel engine for evaluation. The change in the center of gravity caused many problems and the undercarriage had to be made non-retractable. Two others were selected in 1938 for distance record attempts with all-female crews, but an Ilyushin DB-3 was ultimately chosen instead.

== Specifications (ANT-36 / DB-1) ==
Data from OKB Tupolev: A History of the Design Bureau and its Aircraft

General characteristics

- Crew: 3
- Length: 13.4 m (44 ft 0 in)
- Wingspan: 34 m (111 ft 7 in)
- Wing area: 88.2 m^{2} (949 sq ft)
- Airfoil: TsAGI-6 (20%)
- Gross weight: 7,806 kg (17,209 lb)
- Powerplant: 1 × Mikulin AM-34R V-12 liquid-cooled piston engine, 610 kW (820 hp)

Performance

- Maximum speed: 200 km/h (120 mph, 110 kn)
- Range: 4,000 km (2,500 mi, 2,200 nmi)
- Service ceiling: 3,000 m (9,800 ft)

Armament

- Guns: 4 × 7.62 mm (0.3 in) DA machine guns
- Bombs: 1,000 kg (2,205 lb) (up to ten 100 kg (220 lb) FAB-100 bombs)

== See also ==
Related development

- Tupolev ANT-25

Aircraft of comparable role, configuration, and era

- Vickers Wellesley

== Bibliography ==
- Gordon, Yefim & Rigamant, Vladimir (2005). OKB Tupolev: A History of the Design Bureau and its Aircraft. Hinckley, UK: Midland Publishing. ISBN 1-85780-214-4.
- Gunston, Bill (1995). Tupolev Aircraft since 1922. Annapolis, Maryland: Naval Institute Press. ISBN 1-55750-882-8.
