= Chkalovsky (rural locality) =

Chkalovsky (Russian: Чка́ловский; masculine), Chkalovskaya (Чка́ловская; feminine), or Chkalovskoye (Чка́ловское; neuter) is the name of several rural localities in Russia:

- Chkalovsky, Republic of Kalmykia, a settlement in Chkalovskaya Rural Administration of Ketchenerovsky District of the Republic of Kalmykia
- Chkalovsky, Republic of Karelia, a settlement in Loukhsky District of the Republic of Karelia
- Chkalovsky, Kemerovo Oblast, a settlement in Chkalovskaya Rural Territory of Leninsk-Kuznetsky District of Kemerovo Oblast
- Chkalovsky, Asekeyevsky District, Orenburg Oblast, a settlement in Chkalovsky Selsoviet of Asekeyevsky District of Orenburg Oblast
- Chkalovsky, Sol-Iletsky District, Orenburg Oblast, a khutor in Boyevogorsky Selsoviet of Sol-Iletsky District of Orenburg Oblast
- Chkalovsky, Stavropol Krai, a settlement in Novozhiznensky Selsoviet of Budyonnovsky District of Stavropol Krai
- Chkalovskoye, Republic of Bashkortostan, a village in Kaltovsky Selsoviet of Iglinsky District of the Republic of Bashkortostan
- Chkalovskoye, Primorsky Krai, a selo in Spassky District of Primorsky Krai
- Chkalovskoye, Saratov Oblast, a selo in Rovensky District of Saratov Oblast
