= Baydukov Island =

Island in the southern end of the Sea of Okhotsk

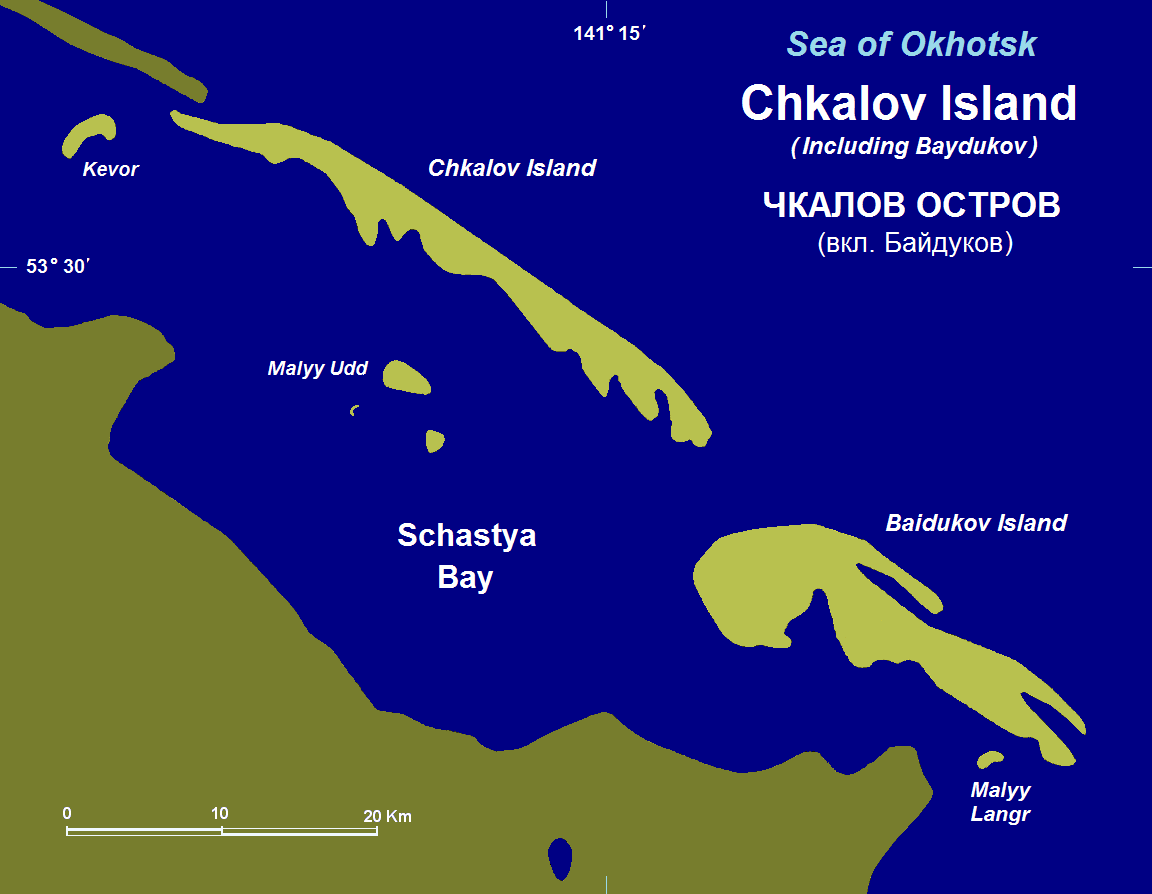
Baydukov island is on the lower right side of the map.

Baydukov Island (Остров Байдуков; Ostrov Baydukov), formerly Langr Island or Bol'shoy Langr Island, is a coastal island in the southern end of the Sea of Okhotsk. It is located southeast of Chkalov Island, off Schastya Bay, facing the northwestern tip of Sakhalin.

Baydukov Island is 12 km long and has a maximum width of less than 3 km in its west-northwest end area.

This island is one of the few areas in Russia where the murrelets (long-billed and marbled) are considered common.

Administratively this island belongs to the Khabarovsk Krai of the Russian Federation.

== History ==
This island was named after Soviet pilot Georgy Baydukov, co-pilot on the Antonov ANT-25 plane that flew on July 20, 1936 from Moscow through Franz Joseph Land, Severnaya Zemlya, Petropavlovsk-Kamchatsky and Khabarovsk. The plane landed 56 hours and 20 minutes later in nearby Udd Island after having covered 9,374 km.

== Adjacent Islands ==
- Belyakov Island (Ostrov Belyakova) 53°14′N 141°25′E lies 11 km south of Baydukov Island's southern coast. It is 0.7 km long and about 500 m wide. This small island was named after Soviet lieutenant Alexander V. Belyakov, navigator of the record-breaking ANT-25 flight.
