= Chizhevski BOK-1 =

BOK-1 ("SS")
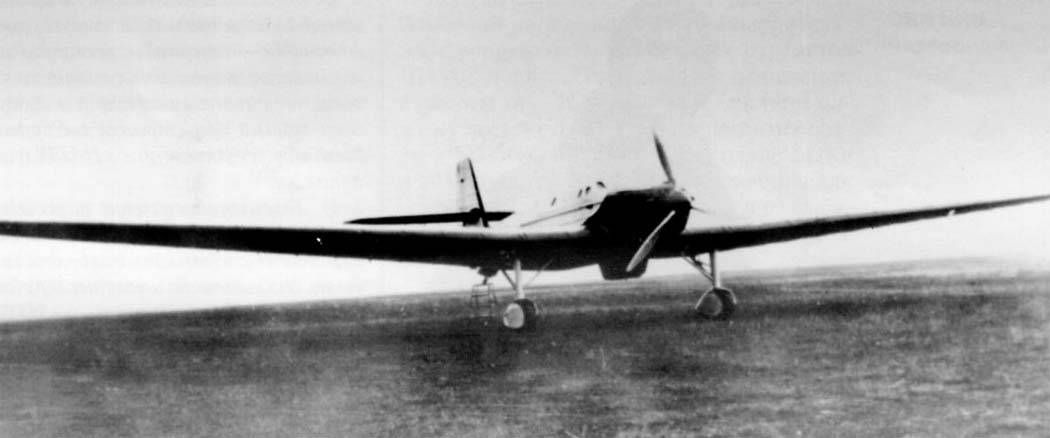
- BOK-1 undergoing state trials, 1936

General information
- Type: High-Altitude research aircraft
- National origin: Soviet Union
- Designer: Bureau of Special Designs Vladimir Chizhevsky (Designer)
- Built by: Plant № 39 (Moscow) (1932–1934); Plant № 35 (Smolensk) (1935)
- Status: Retired
- Number built: 1

History
- First flight: December 13, 1935
- Developed from: Tupolev ANT-25
- Developed into: BOK-7
- Fate: Unknown

The BOK-1, where "BOK" stands for Byuro Osobyh Konstrukcij (Russian: Бюро Особых Конструкций) meaning "Bureau of Special Designs", also known as "SS" — Stratosfernyj Samolyot (Russian: "СС" — Стратосферный Самолёт) meaning "Stratospheric Plane", was a 2-seat, single-engine, low-wing monoplane, designed as an experimental high-altitude aircraft to study the feasibility of performing flights at altitudes above 11,000 metres (36,000 ft). It was the first Soviet plane to implement a pressurized cabin.

== Development ==
The BOK was formed as part of TsAGI (aka. Central Aerohydrodynamic Institute) on the orders of the Soviet Revolutionary Military Council in Dec 1930. One of the first tasks of BOK was to design and build the hermetically sealed gondola of the SSSR-1 high-altitude balloon. BOK engineers were sent to the Junkers factory at Dessau to study the Junkers Ju 49, which was the first aircraft designed from scratch to be equipped with a pressurized cabin for high-altitude flight. The gondola for the SSSR-1 was designed, built and flown successfully to an altitude of 19,000 metres (62,000 ft) on September 30, 1933. BOK was then assigned the task of applying the 'hermetic' cabin to an aircraft with the Tupolev RD chosen as the basis of the BOK-1. A sealed 1.8 m^{3} cylindrical cabin constructed from 1.8–2 mm (0.071–0.079 in) D1 light alloy was fitted to a modified RD airframe.

The cabin had convex bulkheads front and rear with the main entry hatch in the roof and emergency exit through a porthole at the rear. Seven portholes gave sufficient vision with five for the pilot and two for the radio operator/observer. A maximum design pressure differential of 0.22 kg/cm^{2} (3.2 lb/in^{2}) held the cabin altitude at 8,000 m (26,000 ft) up to the aircraft ceiling of 14,000 m (46,000 ft). With the cabin structure sealed, cabin air was dumped overboard at a controlled rate through a dump valve and replaced with oxygen, from storage bottles, maintaining oxygen levels roughly constant. Heating was supplied through radiators in the engine cooling circuit, to keep the cabin between 15 and 18 °C.

The RD airframe was modified with reduced span wings, restressed structure for lower gross weight, fixed spatted single mainwheels, an M-34RN engine and three-bladed propeller, and later an M-34RNV engine and four-bladed propeller. Built at GAZ-35 the BOK-1 was first flown by I.F. Petrov in the summer of 1936 and reached a maximum altitude of 14,000 m in 1938.

== Variants ==
- BOK-7 – A development of the BOK-1, powered by an M-34FRN+2 turbochargers, with an integral pressure cabin (GK) with thicker skins and slimmer profile, pressurised to 0.28 kg/cm^3 by engine driven blower. Two aircraft built using RD airframe with full span wings, dorsal domes with portholes in the roof of the cabin to give adequate vision for pilot and observer. Tests carried out with the armament for the BOK-8.
- BOK-8 – The second BOK-7 aircraft was modified as the BOK-8 high-altitude reconnaissance bomber. The defensive armament of a remote controlled barbette with a ShKAS machine-gun aimed by a Rezunov optical sight, linked electro-mechanically with synchro feedback, in the rear dome of the pressure cabin. Flight trials were carried out circa 1939.
- BOK-11 – Believed to be a reconnaissance aircraft using a BOK-8 airframe powered by a Charomskii M-40 (Ach-30) diesel engine.
- BOK-15 – Two extremely long-range high-altitude research aircraft powered by ACh-30 diesel engines, with retractable undercarriage for minimum drag. Flying at 10,000 m (33,000 ft) the range was to be 20,000 km (12,000 mi). The aircraft were built during 1938–1939 with the first aircraft flown on March 12, 1940, by A.B. Yumashyev and the second by G.F. Baidyukov.

== Specifications (BOK-1 M-34RNV) ==
Data from Gunston, Bill. "The Osprey Encyclopedia of Russian Aircraft 1875–1995". London, Osprey. 1995. ISBN 1-85532-405-9

General characteristics

- Crew: 2
- Length: 12.86 m (42 ft 2 in)
- Wingspan: 30 m (98 ft 5 in)
- Wing area: 78.8 m^{2} (848 sq ft)
- Empty weight: 3,600 kg (7,937 lb)
- Gross weight: 4,800 kg (10,582 lb)
- Powerplant: 1 × M-34 RNV , 619 kW (830 hp)

Performance

- Maximum speed: 260 km/h (160 mph, 140 kn)
- Endurance: 4 hours
- Service ceiling: 14,100 m (46,300 ft)

== See also ==
Aircraft of comparable role, configuration, and era

- Bristol Type 138A
- Junkers Ju 49

Related lists

- List of aircraft
