= Chkalovskaya metro station =

Chkalovskaya metro station may refer to:

- Chkalovskaya (Moscow Metro), a metro station of the Moscow Metro, Moscow, Russia
- Chkalovskaya (Nizhny Novgorod Metro), a station of the Nizhny Novgorod Metro, Nizhny Novgorod, Russia
- Chkalovskaya (Saint Petersburg Metro), a station of the Saint Petersburg Metro, Saint Petersburg, Russia
- Chkalovskaya (Yekaterinburg Metro), a station of the Yekaterinburg Metro, Yekaterinburg, Russia

== See also ==
- Chkalovsky (disambiguation)
