= Chkalovskoye, Republic of Bashkortostan =

Chkalovskoye Чкаловское
- Village
- Location within Bashkortostan Location within Russia
- Coordinates: 54°39′N 56°32′E
- Country: Russia
- Region: Bashkortostan
- District: Iglinsky District
- Time zone: UTC+5:00

Chkalovskoye (Russian: Чкаловское) is a rural locality (a village) in Kaltovsky Selsoviet, Iglinsky District, Bashkortostan, Russia. The population was 134 as of 2010. There are three streets.

== Geography ==
Chkalovskoye is located 37 km southeast of Iglino (the district's administrative centre) by road. Leninskoye is the nearest rural locality.
