= Georgy Baydukov =

Russian-Soviet air officer, test pilot, writer and hunter

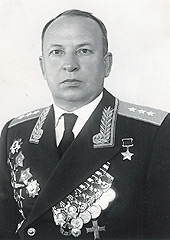
- Born: 13 May 1907; Taryshta, Tomsk Governorate, Russian Empire
- Died: 28 December 1994 (aged 87); Moscow, Russia
- Military career
- Allegiance: Soviet Union
- Branch: Soviet Air Force
- Service years: 1926–1988
- Rank: Colonel-general of Aviation
- Other work: Writer

Georgy Filippovich Baydukov (Russian: Гео́ргий Фили́ппович Байдуко́в; 13 May [O.S. 30 April] 1907 – 28 December 1994) was a Soviet test pilot, Hero of the Soviet Union (1936), writer and hunter. He was one of the leaders in the creation of the Soviet air defense system in the 1950s–1970s. Full holder of the Order “For Service to the Homeland in the Armed Forces of the USSR” (May 25, 1987), laureate of the USSR State Prize (1970), and recipient of the largest number of Soviet orders (21 orders).

== Early years ==
Baydukov was born at the Taryshta railway station in the Tomsk Governorate of the Russian Empire (now Novosibirsk Oblast, Russia) in family of a railway worker. He became an orphan at the age of 9 and was homeless for some time. Baydukov was taken to an orphanage and worked in railway construction for some time.

In March 1926 he enlisted in the Red Army as a volunteer. In 1926 he graduated from the Leningrad Air Force School.

In 1928 he graduated from the Kacha school for military pilots and served as a fighter pilot from 1928 to 1931.

== Test pilot ==
Georgy Baydukov was transferred to the Air Force's Testing institute and became an aircraft test pilot in 1931. He tested a number of fighter planes from 1931 to 1934 and was instrumental in developing instrument flight rules for the Soviet Air Force.

== Ultra-long distance flights ==
Georgy Baydukov became a student at the Air Force Academy in 1934. During that time, he became involved with a number of ultra-long-distance flights conducted by the Soviet Union.

He tried to reach San Francisco flying from Moscow via the North Pole in August 1935 as a member of Levanevsky's crew, flying the ANT-25. The flight was terminated because of technical problems. Baydukov continued to participate in the testing of the ANT-25 from 1935 to 1936.

He was a member of the Communist Party from 1936.

Valery Chkalov, Georgy Baydukov and Alexander Belyakov flew an improved ANT-25 via the North Pole to Udd Island, in the Sea of Okhotsk (distance 9,374 km, flight time 56 h 20 min) from July 20, 1936, to July 22, 1936. Georgy Baydukov was awarded the title of Hero of the Soviet Union for this deed on July 24, 1936.

The same crew piloted an ANT-25 from Moscow to Vancouver, Washington via the North Pole from June 18, 1937, to June 20, 1937 (distance 8,504 km).

Georgy Baydukov resumed his work as a test pilot in 1937. He tested PE-2 and SB bombers, and also participated in tests of the DB-A bomber.

== Second World War ==
In 1939–1940, Baydukov participated in the Soviet-Finnish War. He served in the 85th Bomber Regiment.

In August 1941, Baydukov was sent to meet with US president Franklin D. Roosevelt to secure the purchase of warplanes. He managed to arrange the sale of several P-39 Airacobra fighter planes to the Soviet Union. He returned to the front lines in January 1942.

Baydukov served as deputy commander of the 31st Mixed Aviation Division from December 1941. In February, he assumed command of the division. In March 1942, he became commander of the Air Force of the 4th Shock Army. In May 1942, Baydukov was appointed commander of the 211th Mixed Aviation Division. In June 1942, he became commander of the 212th Assault Aviation Division. In May 1943, the division became the 4th Guards Assault Aviation Division. In January 1944, Baydukov became commander of the 4th Assault Aviation Corps.

== Post-war years ==
In December 1945, Baydukov became deputy commander of the 13th Air Army. In July 1946, he became deputy head of the State Red Banner Air Force Research and Testing Institute for flight testing. Baydukov participated in the Tupolev Tu-70 tests in fall 1947.

From December 1947 until December 1949, he was a head of the Main Department of the Civil Air Fleet (GVF).

In September 1949, Baydukov entered the Higher Military Academy, graduating in December 1951.

Baydukov was a colonel-general of aviation from May 1961.

In the 1980s, he was a consultant of the Ministry of Defense.

Georgy Baydukov served with the Soviet Air Force in various capacities until May 1988, when he retired with the rank of colonel general.

== Honours and awards ==
=== USSR ===
- Hero of the Soviet Union (July 1936)
- Two Orders of Lenin (July 1936, November 1950)
- Order of the October Revolution (December 1972)
- Four Orders of the Red Banner
- Order of Kutuzov 1st class (May 1945)
- Two Orders of Suvorov 2nd class (1944, 1944)
- Order of Kutuzov 2nd class (April 1945)
- Order of the Patriotic War 1st class
- Order of the Patriotic War 2nd class
- Order of the Red Banner of Labour (May 1977)
- Four Orders of the Red Star
- Order for Service to the Homeland 1st, 2nd, and 3rd class
- campaign and jubilee medals

- Medal "For the Capture of Königsberg"
- Medal "For the Victory over Germany in the Great Patriotic War 1941–1945"
- Medal "Veteran of the Armed Forces of the USSR"

- USSR State Prize (1970)
- honorary citizen of Nikolayevsk-on-Amur (since August 1981)

=== Russian Federation ===
- Order of Friendship (April 1994)

=== Foreign awards ===
- Officer of the Legion of Merit (USA)
- Army Distinguished Service Medal (USA)
- Distinguished Flying Cross (USA)
- Medal for Odra, Nisso and the Baltic (Poland)
- Medal for Warsaw (Poland)
- Order of the Grunwald Cross 2nd class (Polish People's Republic, 1946)
- Order of Polonia Restituta 2nd and 3rd classes (Poland)
- Order of Sukhbaatar (Mongolia)
- Order of the Red Banner (Mongolia)
- Czechoslovak War Cross (Czechoslovakia)
- Order of the White Lion 1st class (Czechoslovakia)
- Order of the White Lion 1st class For Victory

== See also ==
- Baydukov Island
- Picture of Pilots Valery Chkalov, Georgy Baydukov and Alexander Belyakov sitting next to their plane on Udd Island
- Anatoliy Kvochur's Su-30 Airplane Lands at Zhukovskiy
