= Chkalov Island =

Island in the southern end of the Sea of Okhotsk

Coordinates: 53°24′N 141°13′E

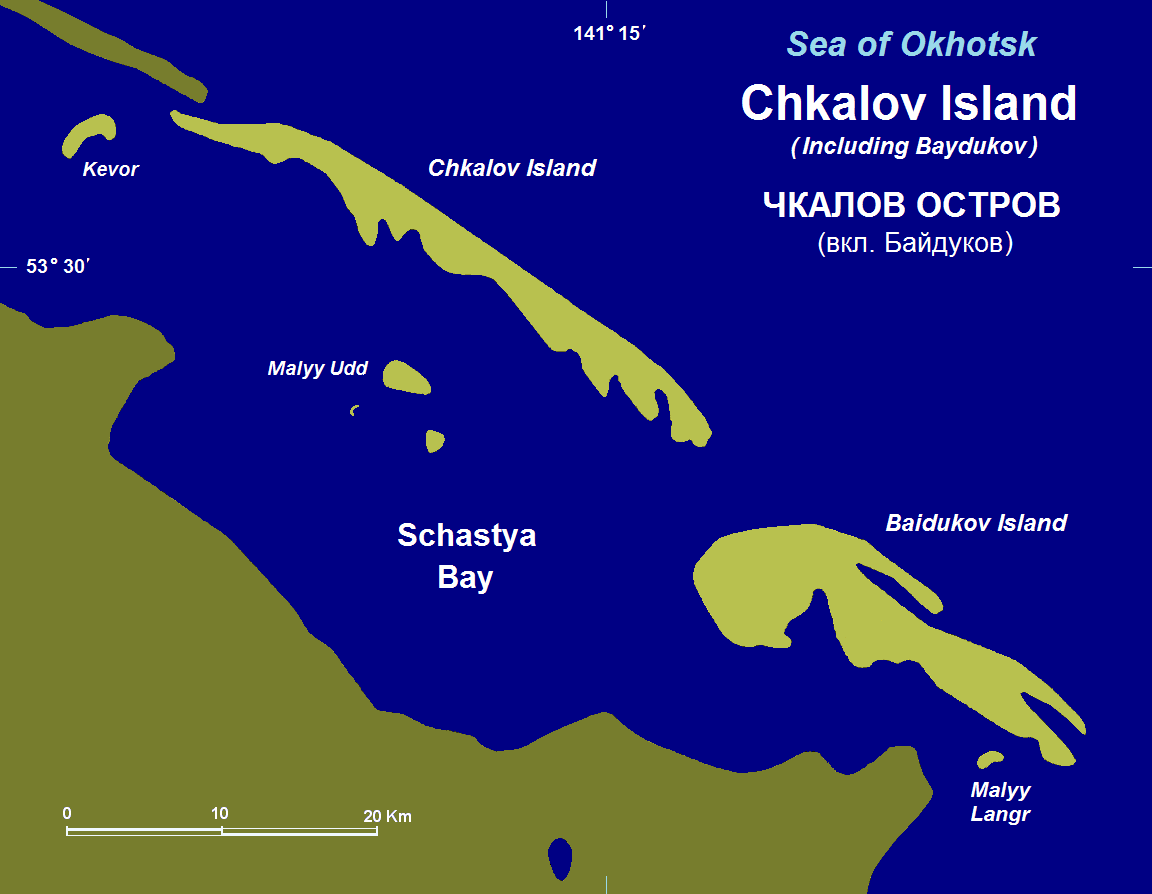

Chkalov Island (Остров Чкалова; Ostrov Chkalova), formerly Udd Island (Остров Удд), is a coastal island in the southern end of the Sea of Okhotsk. It is located off Schastya Bay, between the shorebound lagoon and the sea. Baydukov Island lies only 2 km off its east-southeast tip.

Chkalov Island is long and narrow. It is 20.5 km long and has an average width of 1 km.

This island is a natural habitat for many birds, like the great knot, red-necked stint, dunlin, whimbrel, bar-tailed godwit and the common sandpiper. Beluga whales are common off its northern waters.

Administratively Chkalov Island belongs to the Khabarovsk Krai of the Russian Federation.

== History ==
Chkalov Island is named after Soviet pilot Valery Pavlovich Chkalov (1904–1938), the commander on the Antonov ANT-25 plane that flew on July 20, 1936, from Moscow through Franz Joseph Land, Severnaya Zemlya, Petropavlovsk and Khabarovsk. The plane landed 56 hours and 20 minutes later in the evening twilight, in thick fog, on a coastal strip in Udd Island after having covered 9,374 kilometres (5,825 miles). The three-man crew remained overnight on this island at the home of a local resident, Fetin'ya Andreevna Smirnova. In order to take off a 500-metre-long (1,600-foot) wooden runway had to be built. Udd Island was renamed Chkalov Island by Stalin in commemoration of the record-breaking event. In 2006, this historical flight was recreated on a Sukhoi Su-30 to mark the 70th anniversary of Chkalov's prowess.
