= Chkalov, Armenia =

Chkalov Չկալով
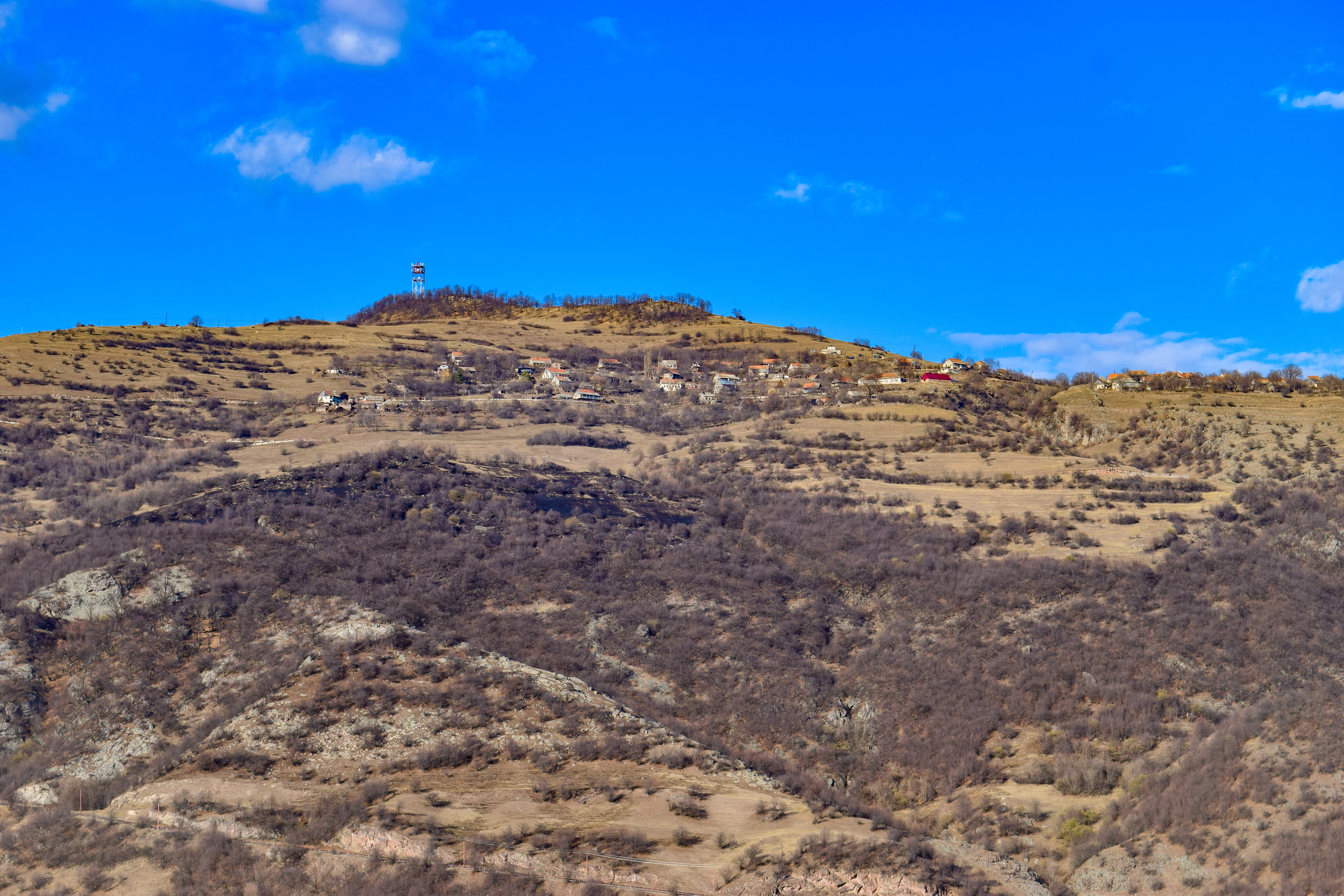

- Location within Armenia
- Coordinates: 40°56′04″N 44°39′12″E
- Country: Armenia
- Marz (Province): Lori

Population (2011)
  - Total: 144
- Time zone: UTC+4 ( )
  - Summer (DST): UTC+5 ( )

Chkalov (Armenian: Չկալով, also Romanized as Ch’kalov) is a village in the Lori Province of Armenia.
