= Pearson Field =

Airport in Vancouver, Washington

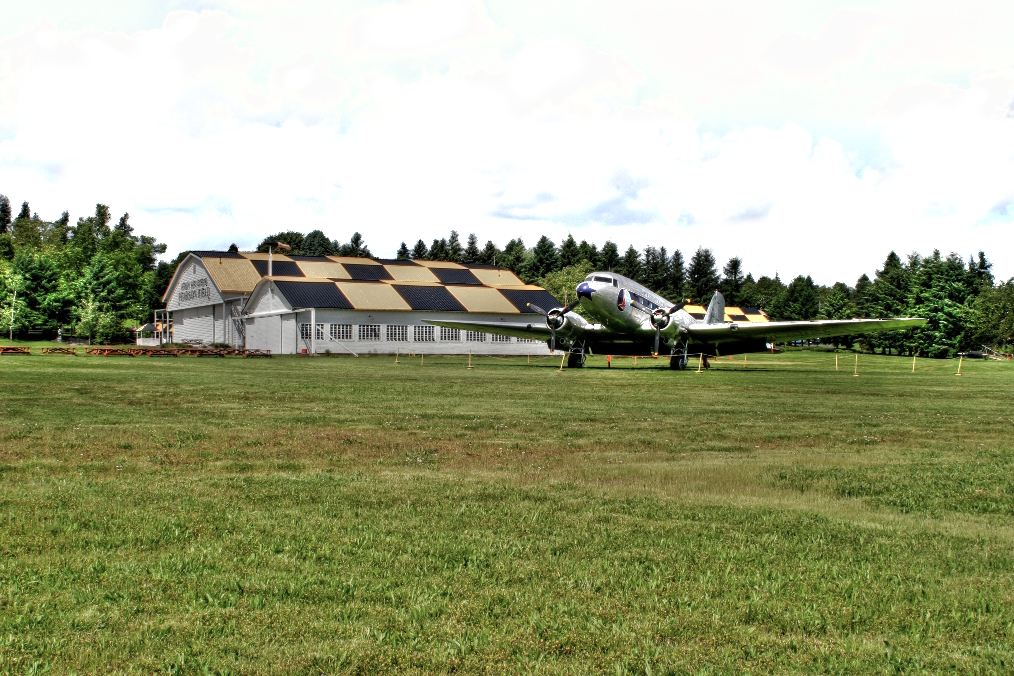
- IATA: none; ICAO: KVUO; FAA LID: VUO

Summary
- Airport type: Public
- Owner: City of Vancouver
- Serves: Vancouver, Washington
- Elevation AMSL: 29 ft (8.8 m)
- Coordinates: 45°37′14″N 122°39′23″W
- Interactive map of Pearson Field

Runways
Direction	Length		Surface
Direction	ft	m	Surface
8/26	3,275	998	Asphalt

Statistics (2022)
- Aircraft operations: 52,700
- Based aircraft: 151
- Source: Federal Aviation Administration

Pearson Field (ICAO: KVUO, FAA LID: VUO) also once known as Pearson Airpark, is a city-owned municipal airport located one mile (2 km) southeast of the central business district of Vancouver, a city in Clark County, Washington, United States.

Pearson Field is the oldest continuously operating airfield in the Pacific Northwest and one of the two oldest continuously operating airfields in the United States, receiving recognition in 2012 as an American Institute of Aeronautics and Astronautics historic aerospace site. Pearson Field's history began with the landing of a Baldwin airship, piloted by Lincoln Beachey, upon the polo grounds of the Vancouver Barracks in 1905. It is located in the Fort Vancouver National Historic Site immediately to the east of the reconstructed fort. Primarily used for general aviation, the airfield's lone runway is located directly beneath the final approach to runway 10L at nearby Portland International Airport. The airport lies adjacent to Washington State Route 14 and the Columbia River.

== History ==
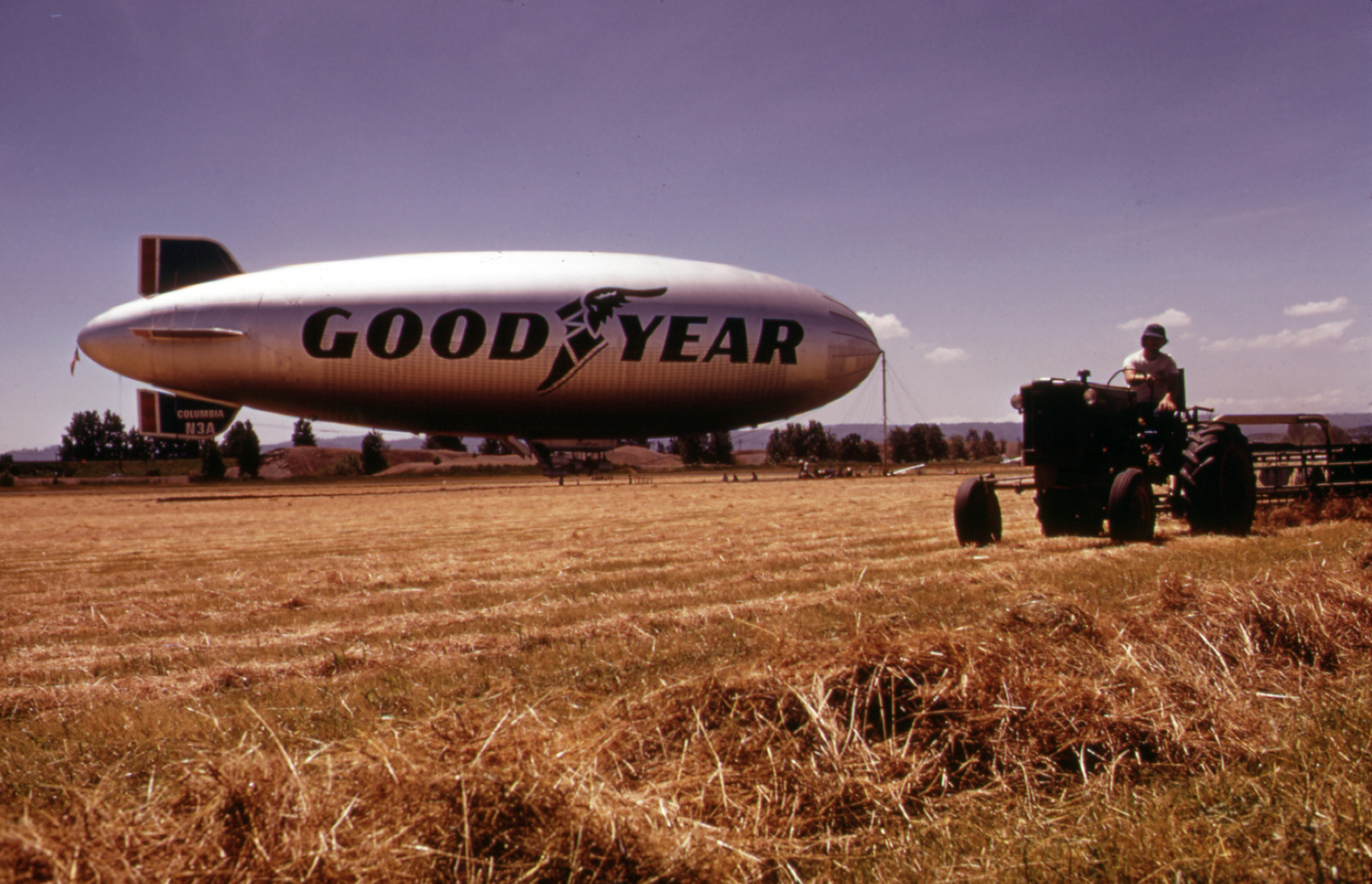
The Goodyear Blimp Columbia N3A, moored at Pearson, June 1973.

Pearson Field's history dates back to the early 1900s and is named for local resident First Lieutenant Alexander Pearson Jr. of the United States Army.

1905
Lincoln Beachey pilots his Baldwin airship from the grounds of the 1905 Lewis and Clark Centennial Exposition on the shores of Guild's Lake in Portland, Oregon, to Vancouver Barracks, a distance of approximately 8 miles, in the first aerial crossing of the Columbia River. Beachey also set an endurance record for flight at the time. Carrying a letter from Theodore Hardee, an official of the fair, to the commandant of the Vancouver Barracks, General Constant Williams, the flight is also recognized as the first time an airship is used to deliver a letter.
1911
First airplane lands at Pearson Field.
1912
A homebuilt aircraft built onsite becomes the first aircraft departure.
1923–1941
Pearson Field is home to the US Army Air Service.
1923
Commander Lt. Oakley G. Kelly makes the first non-stop transcontinental flight.
1924
Pearson Field is a stopover point on the army's first round-the-world flight.
1925
Pearson Field is named after Lt. Alexander Pearson by order of Major General John L. Hines. On 16 September 1925, during the inauguration of Pearson Field, in front of 20,000 spectators and against 53 competitor pilots, Edith Foltz won the dead-stick landing competition.
1937
Soviet aviator Valery Chkalov lands at the end of the first non-stop transpolar flight.
1975
Chkalov monument dedicated.
1994
City of Vancouver and National Park Service enter into agreement governing the future of Pearson Field.
2005
Pearson Field celebrates its 100-year anniversary.
2012
Pearson Field receives AIAA historic aerospace site designation.
2015
AIAA monument placed.
2016
Former State Representative John McKibbin, along with Irene Mustain, depart from the field; their plane crashes in the Columbia River.

== Facilities and aircraft ==
Pearson Field covers an area of 82 acres (33 ha) which contains one runway designated 8/26 with a 3,275 ft × 60 ft (998 m × 18 m) asphalt pavement. For the 12-month period ending December 31, 2022, the airport had 52,700 aircraft operations, an average of 144 per day: 100% general aviation, <1% military and <1% air taxi. At that time there were 151 aircraft based at this airport: 144 single-engine, 4 multi-engine, 2 helicopter, and 1 glider.

The airfield has a 150 T-hangars and tiedown facilities, with capacity for 175 light aircraft.

Located adjacent to the airfield are the Pearson Air Museum and Aero Maintenance Flight Center, a full service FBO, maintenance station, avionics station, and part 61 and part 141 approved flight school, and the Pearson Field Education Center.

== Economic impact ==
The state of Washington provides economic impact studies of airports within the state. In the 2001 report, Pearson Field contributed about 600 jobs to the area. Salaries drawn in relation to business at Pearson total about US$11 million. The total economic activity related to Pearson totals about US$38 million. There was an updated report in 2012.

== Accidents and incidents ==
- On 28 June 2022, a Beechcraft Bonanza V35B registered N444PM crashed on landing at the airport. The pilot, the sole occupant of the plane, was killed in the crash. The NTSB determined the probable cause to be an aerodynamic stall caused by the pilot continuing on approach and executing a steep turn despite improper positioning of the aircraft in relation to typical approach procedures.

== See also ==
- Grove Field
- Hillsboro Airport
- List of airports in Washington
- Portland International Airport
- Portland-Troutdale Airport
- Swan Island Municipal Airport
