= Sigizmund Levanevsky =

Soviet aviator (1902–1937)

- Russian: Сигизмунд Александрович Леваневский; Polish: Zygmunt Lewoniewski
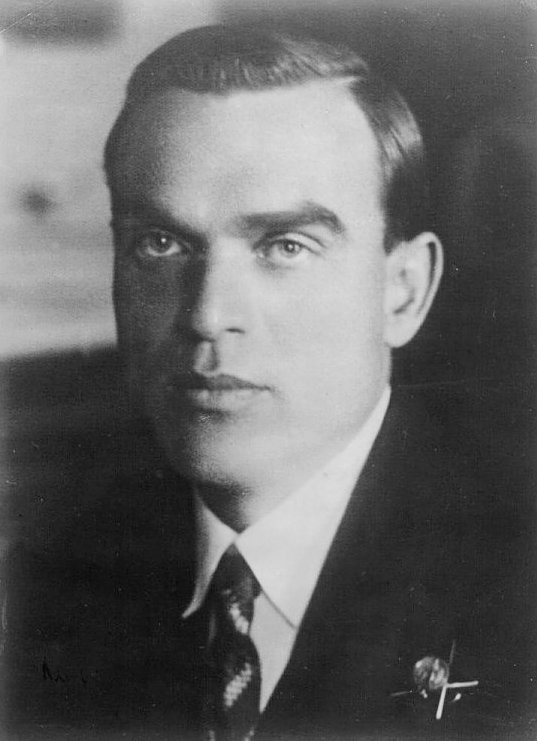
- Born: 15 May [O.S. 2 May] 1902; St. Petersburg, Russian Empire
- Died: 13 August 1937 (aged 35); Arctic Ocean
- Military career
- Allegiance: Soviet Union
- Branch: Soviet Army before 1925; Soviet Air Force since 1925
- Service years: 1917–1930
- Conflicts: October Revolution; Russian Civil War
- Awards: Hero of the Soviet Union

Sigizmund Aleksandrovich Levanevsky (Russian: Сигизмунд Александрович Леваневский, Polish: Zygmunt Lewoniewski; 15 May [O.S. 2 May] 1902 – 13 August 1937) was a Soviet pioneer of long-range flight who was awarded the title Hero of the Soviet Union in 1934 for his role in the SS Chelyuskin rescue.

== Life and career ==
Sigizmund Levanevsky was born to a Polish family in Saint Petersburg on 15 May [O.S. 2 May] 1902. His brother Józef Lewoniewski (1899-1933) was a Polish military and sports pilot. Sigizmund took part in the October Revolution on the Bolshevik side and later participated in the Russian Civil War, serving in the Red Army since 1918. In 1925 he graduated from the Sevastopol Naval Aviation School and became a military pilot. In 1930 he was withdrawn to reserve. From 1932 to 1933 he was head of flight and training unit of All-Ukraine Pilot School.

In 1933 Levanevsky became a pilot for the Glavsevmorput' (Main Northern Maritime Route's Administration) - providing ice reconnaissance for shipping convoys in the eastern part of the northeast passage. At July 20, 1933 he achieved his first international fame, evacuating from Anadyr to Nome the American pilot Jimmie Mattern who had crash landed to the west of Anadyr during his attempt to break the record for a solo flight around the world.

The following year Levanevsky and fellow-pilot Mavriky Slepnyov traveled to Alaska to obtain a pair of Consolidated Fleetster 17AF transport planes for use in the aerial rescue efforts for the passengers of the crushed steamship Chelyuskin. During the March 24th flight from Nome, Levanevsky's plane was forced down at Kolyuchin Bay on the north Chukotka coast and during landing its skis were ripped off. Slepnyov evacuated him to the operations base at Vankarem but without a plane Levanevsky did not participate in the rescue efforts. However, he would later shuttle a doctor from Uelen to Saint Lawrence Bay at Chukotka for emergency attention for Bobrov, deputy head of the expedition, who suffered from appendicitis - for which he was awarded the title of the Hero of the Soviet Union. In 1934 he became member of the Communist Party.

== North Pole flights ==
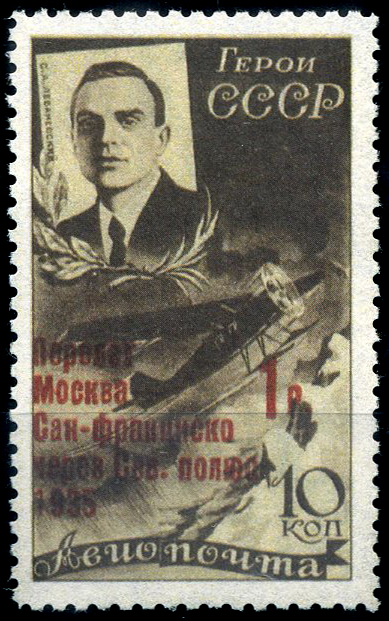
Postage stamp, USSR, 1935: Sigizmund Levanevsky stamp with commemorative red overprint for "Moscow - San Francisco flight via the North Pole", August 1935.

On 3 August 1935 Levanevsky and a two-man crew (co-pilot Georgy Baydukov and navigator Viktor Levchenko) attempted a transpolar flight from Moscow to San Francisco in a prototype single engine Tupolev ANT-25 long-range bomber. A thousand miles into the flight (just north of the Kola Peninsula) the oil tank developed an oil-leak, being overfilled, and Levanevsky chose to abort the mission.

In the summer of 1936, Levanevsky and Viktor Levchenko evaluated the air route from Santa Monica, California to Moscow, via Alaska and Siberia. The 10,000 mile flight was made in a Vultee V-1AS, though the floats were replaced with wheel landing gear. For this flight Levanevsky was awarded with Order of Red Banner of Labour.

On 12 August 1937 a type Bolkhovitinov DB-A (no. N-209, a Dalniy Bombardirovshik-Academy, i.e. Long-range Bomber) aircraft with 6-men crew under captaincy of Levanevsky started its long distance flight from Moscow to the United States (to Fairbanks) via the North Pole. The radio communications with the crew broke off the next day, on the 13th of August, at 17:58 Moscow time after the North Pole, when the aircraft encountered adverse weather conditions and suffered failure of its end right engine. The Soviet Government financed two aerial searches for the missing aircraft using purchased US aircraft under the command of Canadian bush and Antarctic pilot Herbert Hollick-Kenyon in 1937 and 1938. Jimmie Mattern flew a Lockheed 12, "The Texan" from California to assist in the search for his former rescuer in the initial search. After the unsuccessful search attempts all the members of the crew were presumed dead.

In March 1999, Dennis Thurston of the Minerals Management Service in Anchorage located what appeared to be wreckage in the shallows of Camden Bay, between Prudhoe Bay and Kaktovik. There was conjecture in the media that it was Levanevsky's aircraft, but a subsequent attempt to locate the object again proved unsuccessful.

== See also ==
- List of people who disappeared mysteriously at sea
