= Tupolev ANT-25 =

1930s Soviet experimental long-range aircraft

ANT-25
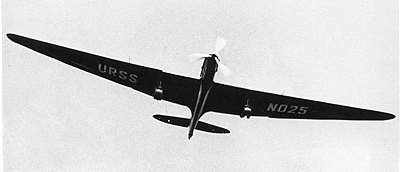
- RD N025 in flight

General information
- Type: Experimental long-range aircraft (bomber)
- Manufacturer: Voronezh Aircraft Production Association
- Designer: Pavel Sukhoi
- Primary user: Soviet Air Force
- Number built: 2

History
- First flight: 22 June 1933
- Variant: Tupolev DB-1

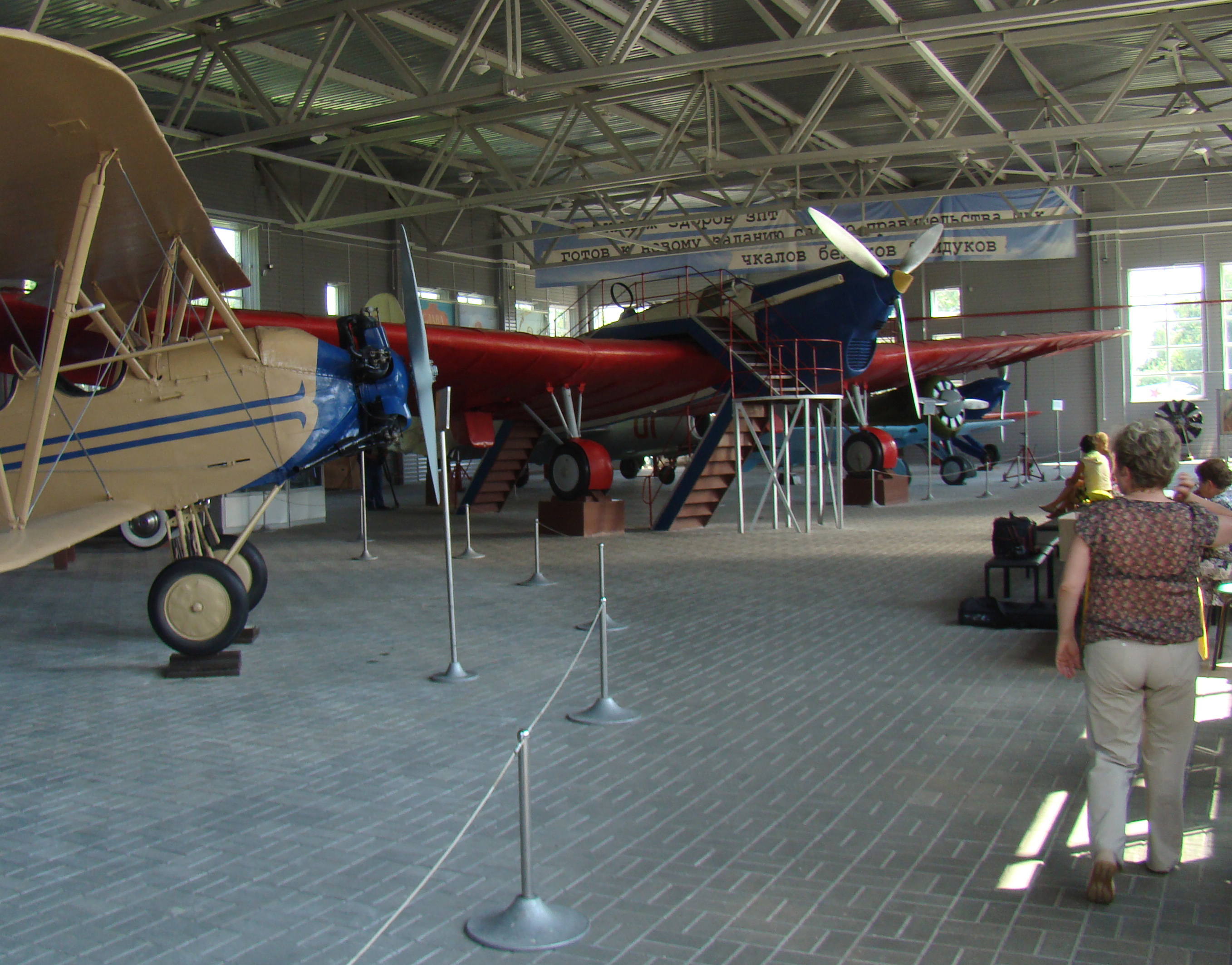
ANT-25 in Chkalov Museum, Chkalovsk

The Tupolev ANT-25 was a Soviet long-range experimental aircraft which was also tried as a bomber. First constructed in 1933, it was used by the Soviet Union for a number of record-breaking flights.

== Development ==
The ANT-25 was designed as the result of a recommendation by Kliment Voroshilov to the Revolutionary Military Council Revvoyensovyet on 7 December 1931, to build an aircraft for long-range flights.

The aircraft was designed by the brigade of the Experimental Aircraft Design Department of TsAGI led by Pavel Sukhoi under the overall supervision of Andrei Tupolev. The first prototype, designated Experimental Airplane RD-1, (also designated TsAGI-25, ANT-25), RD standing for Rekord Dalnosty, i.e. "Range Record") made its maiden flight on 22 June 1933, piloted by Mikhail Gromov, using a direct-drive M-34 engine.

== Flights ==
The first crew, Gromov, Filin and Spirin, began with a long-range test flight in September 1934 on the second prototype, the RD-2. The RD-2 used a geared M-34R engine, which substantially increased its range. They spent 75 hours in the air, covering 12,411 kilometres (7,712 mi) in a single trip, (Moscow–Ryazan–Tula–Dnepropetrovsk–Kharkov). The aircraft was unable to return to Moscow because of a fuel shortage. Gromov was made a Hero of the Soviet Union. The flight was not recognised as a world record as it could not complete the circuit to Moscow, and so could not claim the closed-circuit record, while the direct distance between Moscow and Kharkov was too short for the distance in a straight-line record.

Gromov and Andrey Yumashev decided to make their next long-range flight an attempt at the straight-line record. They wanted to fly the traditional long-range route via Africa and the Atlantic Ocean to South America. A crewman, Sigizmund Levanevsky, on studying some maps, suggested they fly in a completely different direction – to the north. Polar aviators were extremely popular at that time, so his plan was considered plausible. The flight was cancelled in the spring of 1935 when he fell seriously ill.

The next long-range flight planned was from Moscow to the US via the North Pole. A sloping concrete runway, 4 kilometres (2.5 mi) in length, was built at Schelkovo air base near Moscow. In the early morning of 3 August 1935, Levanevsky, Baydukov and Levchenko climbed aboard their RD and took to the air. For the first 50 kilometres (31 mi), the aircraft ascended to only 500 metres (1,600 ft). They then steadily increased their altitude to 5,000 metres (16,000 ft), maintaining an average speed of 165 kilometres per hour (103 mph). After approximately 2,000 kilometres (1,200 mi), an oil leak was discovered, but the aircraft was able to make an emergency landing at Krechevits near Novgorod. Levanevsky was called to a Politburo meeting, where he blamed Tupolev, declaring that his single-engined ANT-25 was underpowered. It seemed to be the end for the aircraft.

His second pilot, Georgy Baydukov, who was also an aviation engineer, disagreed and proposed Valery Chkalov for a second attempt. Chkalov was at first sceptical about his selection, as he was a fighter pilot with little navigational knowledge. Baydukov briefed Chkalov on the finer points of flying the ANT-25 and proposed Alexander Belyakov, who was the chief instructor of their flight academy, as their third crewman. Chkalov's authority was enough to convince Joseph Stalin.

In July 1936, the record was broken by Chkalov, Georgy Baydukov and Belyakov flying the same aircraft from Moscow to the Far East (Stalin's Route) in 56 hours 20 minutes, a distance of 9,374 kilometres (5,825 mi). They passed Franz Josef Land–Severnaya Zemlya–Tiksi–Yakutia–Petropavlovsk-Kamchatsky–Khabarovsk–Okhotsk Sea and landed on a beach at Udd Island (now called Chkalov Island), near the Amur River.

The next day, the Pravda newspaper published a leading article "Glory to Stalin's Falcons!" («Слава сталинским соколам!»). A wooden runway was constructed on Udd island, and on 2 August the ANT-25 departed for Moscow. The trip back lasted a week, with stops at Khabarovsk, Chita, Krasnoyarsk and Omsk, with a grand welcome at each. Chkalov's trio each became a Heroes of the Soviet Union. Two islands nearby were renamed after Baydukov and Belyakov.

Chkalov's achievement became world-famous; however, the Politburo still wanted the publicity of a direct flight. Gromov was ordered to fly to Brazil on 14 August 1936 in a second ANT-25, but as he prepared for the start on 25 September, Brazilian officials denied access to the Soviet plane, and the flight was cancelled.

Both Chkalov's and Gromov's crews were now destined to fly north from Moscow to San Francisco. Over 18–20 June 1937 – the same crew of pilot Valery Chkalov, co-pilot Georgi Baidukov and navigator Alexander Belyakov made a non-stop flight from Moscow to Portland, United States, in bad weather. At the 60-hour point they passed Seattle, and after two more hours they passed the Portland lighthouse on the Columbia River and headed deeper into US territory. Over the city of Eugene they found they were short of fuel and turned back for the army airbase at Fort Vancouver Barracks at Vancouver, landing at Pearson Airfield. The 9,130-kilometre (5,670 mi) trip took 63 hours and 25 minutes. In 1975, an obelisk was erected on the airfield to commemorate this event.

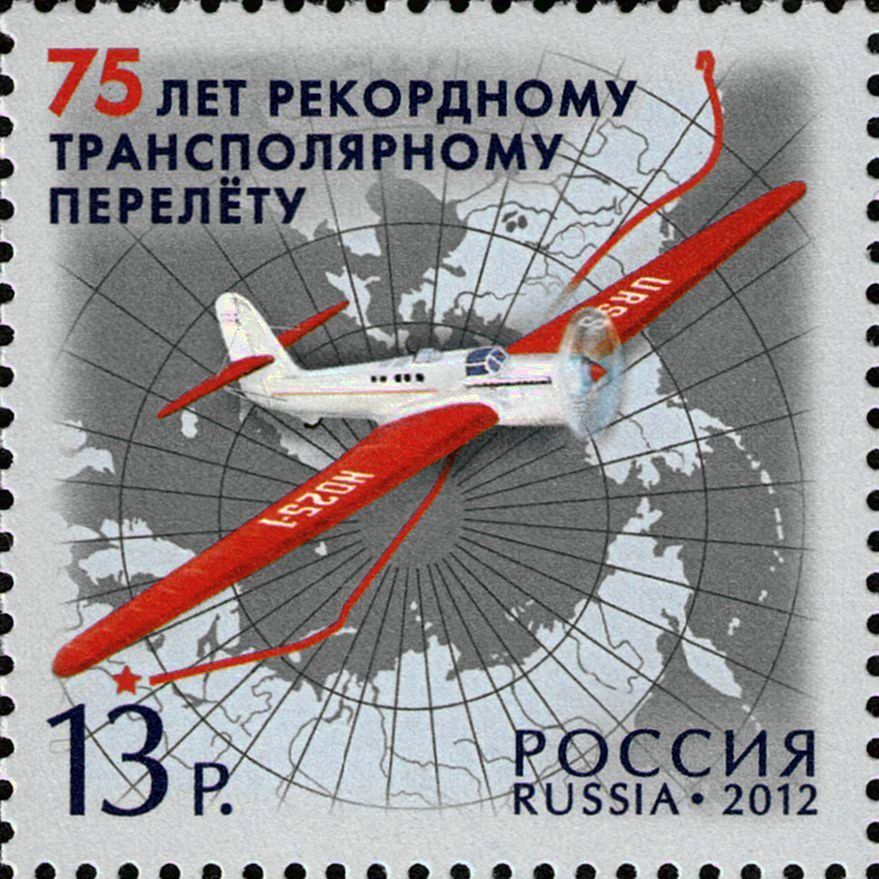
Commemorative stamp illustration of the Moscow-San Jacinto transpolar flight

Another widely publicized feat was the Moscow–San Jacinto non-stop flight in a backup aircraft just three weeks after Chkalov's. This journey, via the North Pole, covered 11,500 kilometres (7,100 mi) and ended in a dairy pasture outside of San Jacinto, California, after they had encountered fog conditions in San Diego and as far inland as March Air Force base in Riverside. The landing site is marked by California State Historical Landmark Number 989. The crew, still composed of Gromov, Yumashev, and Sergey Danilin, flew for 62 hours and 17 minutes between 12 and 14 July 1937. After landing, the aircraft still had sufficient fuel for approximately 1,500 kilometres (930 mi), enough to reach Panama. This would have involved crossing the Mexican border without the permission of FAI sporting officials.

== After retirement ==
Gromov became an unofficial Soviet Pilot No. 1, though Chkalov remained the favourite pilot of the Soviet people. Joy at the achievements were tempered by Levanevsky crashing on the same route in a brand-new four-engined DB-A.

The record set by the Soviets was broken by two British Vickers Wellesley bombers which flew from Egypt to Australia in November 1938; a distance of 11,523.9 kilometres (7,160.6 mi). The USSR did not continue the race as aviation design bureau work was stalled by repression: Tupolev was jailed, and Gromov was also on the brink of arrest. Chkalov crashed while testing a new fighter on 15 December 1938.

After Chkalov's death, Usachyov, the Chief of the Aviation Industry Directorate, Belyaikin, the director of the plant where Chkalov's machine had been built, and Tomashevich, the designer, all came under suspicion of sabotage. Nikolai Polikarpov escaped arrest.

The Soviets displayed the ANT-25 flown by Chkalov from Moscow to Vancouver at their pavilion at the 1939 New York World's Fair.

== Design ==
The main reason for the aircraft's success was its wing design. The wide-span wings gave the aircraft good range and fuel-efficiency, and they could also house large fuel tanks. The proportion of the wingspan to the chord was more than a factor of 13. Fuel was 52% of the takeoff weight, the tanks had been moved from the fuselage – this allowed the wings to tension as fuel weight opposed the aerodynamics forces.

Research was conducted into special forms of vibration of the aircraft because of the longer wings and at a speed greater than some critical point – the so-called flutter effect.

To stay afloat after ditching, the ANT-25 used air-filled bags made of rubberised fabric.

According to the archives, the idea of a military variant of the RD first came to the engineer Zhemchuzhin of the 7th sector of the Soviet Air Force Scientific Research Institute. However, its slow speed, low altitude, poor maneuverability and large wingspan made it a perfect target for fighters and anti-aircraft guns.

Only two aircraft were manufactured, which were followed by the Tupolev DB-1. In 1934 the aviation plant in Voronezh received an order to construct 50 DB-1 aircraft (designated ANT-36) for the Air Force. The Tupolev design bureau built an exact replica of an ANT-25 in 1989 for Monino aviation museum.

== Variants ==
DB-1
Unsuccessful bomber. Few built. Max speed 210 kilometres per hour (130 mph).

== Operators ==
Soviet Union

- Soviet Air Force

== Specifications (ANT-25 No.1) ==
Data from The Osprey Encyclopaedia of Russian Aircraft 1875 – 1995

General characteristics

- Crew: three
- Length: 13.4 m (44 ft 0 in)
- Wingspan: 34 m (111 ft 7 in)
- Height: 5.5 m (18 ft 1 in)
- Wing area: 87.1 m^{2} (938 sq ft)
- Empty weight: 3,700 kg (8,157 lb)
- Gross weight: 8,000 kg (17,637 lb)
- Fuel capacity: dubler (1936) – 5,880 kg (12,963 lb) + 350 kg (772 lb)
- Powerplant: 1 × Mikulin M-34 V-12 liquid-cooled piston engine, 560 kW (750 hp)

Performance

- Maximum speed: 246 km/h (153 mph, 133 kn)
- Range: 7,200 km (4,500 mi, 3,900 nmi)
- Endurance: 48 hours
- Service ceiling: 2,100 m (6,900 ft) fully loaded
  - 7,850 m (25,755 ft) lightly loaded

== See also ==
Related development

- Tupolev DB-1 - Military version of ANT-25
- BOK-1 - Altitude record plane that inherited a number of components from ANT-25

Aircraft of comparable role, configuration, and era

- Blériot 110
- Dewoitine D.33
- Fairey Long-range Monoplane
- Gasuden Koken

== Bibliography ==
- Gunston, Bill (1995). The Osprey Encyclopaedia of Russian Aircraft 1875 – 1995. London: Osprey. ISBN 1-85532-405-9.
