= Pearson Air Museum =

Aviation museum in Vancouver, Washington, US

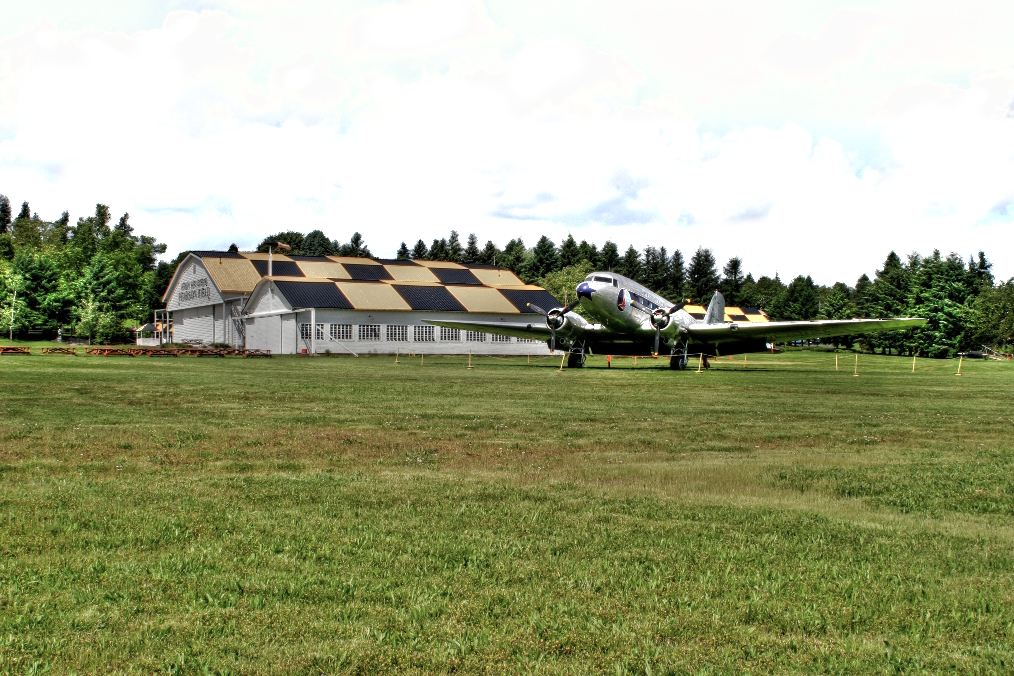
- Pearson Air Museum
- Location: 1115 E 5th Street, Vancouver, WA 98661
- Coordinates: 45.6240°N 122.6564°W
- Type: Aviation museum
- Website: Pearson Air Museum

The Pearson Air Museum is a place-based aviation museum at Pearson Field in Vancouver, Washington, USA. Managed by the National Park Service as part of the Fort Vancouver National Historic Site, museum exhibits provide an opportunity for visitors to explore aviation history tied to Pearson Field and Vancouver Barracks. Objects and artifacts from the National Park Service collections and on loan from members of the community and other museums depict history of aviation in the Pacific Northwest. The museum notably houses the first plane flown by Leah Hing, the first Chinese American woman to earn a pilot's license.

== Exhibits ==
The "Straight-Grained Soldiers" exhibit includes interpretive panels, displays of artifacts, a large diorama, and participatory elements tied to the aviation history of World War I in the Pacific Northwest. As military aviation transformed methods of warfare during the First World War, spruce lumber to build combat, reconnaissance, and training airplanes was in high demand. The Pacific Northwest was home to one of the world's best supplies of spruce, and so the U.S. Military created the Spruce Production Division, headquartered at Vancouver Barracks, to ensure that the allies would have enough spruce to produce aircraft. At its peak, the Spruce Mill, once located on the plain where Fort Vancouver and Pearson Air Museum are located today, operated 24 hours a day, 7 days a week, and produced 1 million board feet of lumber daily. The exhibit takes visitors from the entry of the United States into the war in 1917, through the creation of the Spruce Production Division and the home-front efforts undertaken in Vancouver, up to the end of the war and the birth of the Army Air Service.

== Change in management ==
The Pearson Air Museum has always been owned by the National Park Service, but was formerly managed under an agreement with the City of Vancouver, with a sub-agreement with the non-profit Fort Vancouver National Site Trust. On January 1, 2013, the City of Vancouver terminated their agreement with the National Park Service to continue operating the museum. On February 5, 2013, without a direct agreement with the Fort Vancouver National Site Trust, the National Park Service notified the Fort Vancouver National Site Trust that they could no longer manage the museum. In response the Trust removed all privately owned artifacts from the museum (except for two aircraft that were suspended from the ceiling). The National Park Service then began to directly staff the museum.
