= Valery Chkalov =

Soviet test pilot (1904–1938)

- Валерий Чкалов
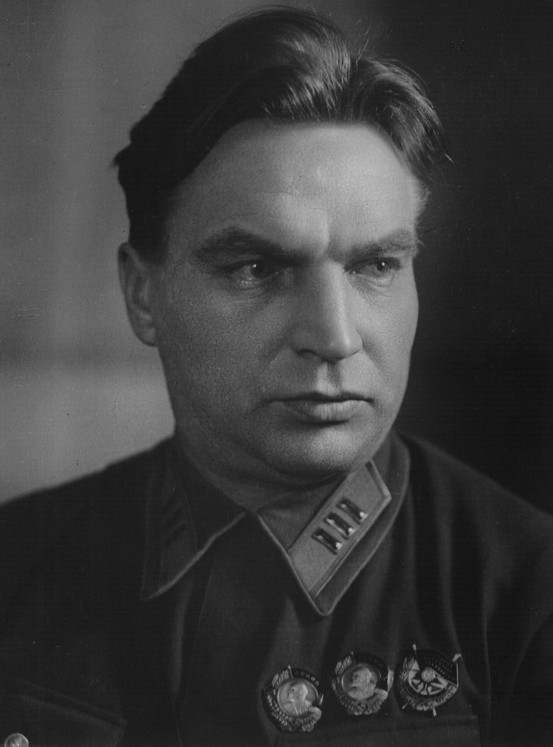
- Chkalov in 1938
- Born: 2 February 1904; Vasilyevo, Nizhny Novgorod Governorate, Russian Empire
- Died: 15 December 1938 (aged 34); Moscow, Russian SFSR, Soviet Union
- Burial place: Kremlin Wall Necropolis
- Military career
- Allegiance: Soviet Union
- Branch: Soviet Air Force
- Service years: 1921–1938
- Rank: Combrig (Brigadier)
- Awards: Hero of the Soviet Union; Order of Lenin (2); Order of the Red Banner

Valery Pavlovich Chkalov (Note: In this name that follows East Slavic naming customs, the patronymic is Pavlovich and the family name is Chkalov.) (Russian: Валерий Павлович Чкалов; IPA: [vɐˈlʲerʲɪj ˈpavləvʲɪtɕ ˈtɕkaləf]; 2 February [O.S. 20 January] 1904 – 15 December 1938) was a Russian and Soviet test pilot awarded the title Hero of the Soviet Union (1936).

== Early life ==
Chkalov was born to a Russian family in 1904 in the upper Volga region, the town of Vasilyevo (the town is now named Chkalovsk in his honour), which lies near Nizhny Novgorod.

He was the son of a ship boiler-maker at the Vasselyevo Ship Yard on the River Volga. His mother died when he was six years old. Chkalov studied in the technical school in Cherepovets but later returned to his home town to work as an apprentice in the shipyard alongside his father. He then got a job as a stoker on a river dredger: the Bayan (later renamed the Mikhail Kalinin).

He saw his first plane in 1919 and decided to join the Red Army's air force, joining first at age 16 as a mechanic. He trained as a pilot at the Yegoryevsk Training School and graduated in 1924 joining a fighter squadron.

Chkalov married Olga Orekhova, a schoolteacher from Leningrad, in 1927. In the early 1930s he became a test pilot. His feats included doing 250 loop-the-loops in 45 minutes. His youngest daughter was a posthumous child.

== Achievements ==
From 1935 he led the stunt section of the Soviet air force, used in public displays. This included the 1 May celebrations over Red Square at which point he met Stalin for the first time.

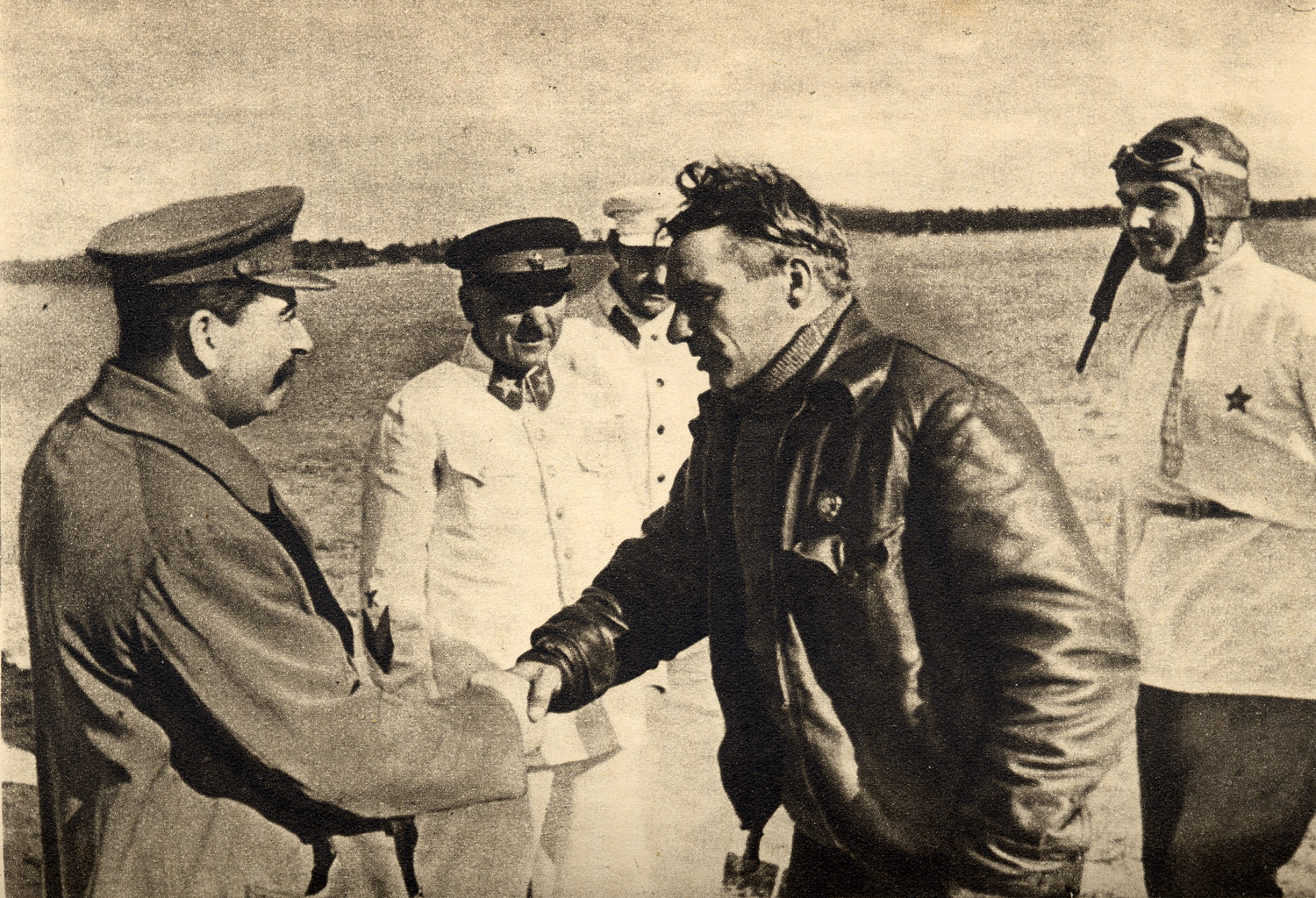
Chkalov meets with Joseph Stalin.

Chkalov achieved several milestones in aviation. In 1936 and 1937, he participated in several ultra long flights, including a 63-hour flight from Moscow, Soviet Union to Vancouver, Washington, United States via the North Pole in a Tupolev ANT-25 airplane (18–20 June 1937), a non-stop distance of 8,811 kilometres (5,475 mi). The flight pioneered the polar air route from Europe to the American Pacific Coast.

He was planning the world's first non-stop flight around the planet when he died.

== Death ==
Chkalov died on 15 December 1938 while piloting a prototype of the Polikarpov I-180 fighter, which crashed during its maiden test flight. The series of events leading up to the crash is not entirely clear. Neither of the aircraft's two chief designers, Nikolai Polikarpov and Dmitry Tomashevich, approved the flight, and no one had signed a form releasing the prototype from the factory.

In any case, Chkalov took off and made a low altitude circuit around the airfield. For the second circuit, Chkalov flew farther away, climbing to over 2,000 m (6,560 ft) even though the flight plan specifically forbade exceeding 600 m (1,970 ft). Chkalov apparently miscalculated his landing approach and came in short of the airfield; when he attempted to correct his approach, the engine cut out. Chkalov was able to avoid several buildings, but struck an overhead powerline. He was thrown from the cockpit, sustaining severe injuries, and died two hours later. His ashes are interred in the Kremlin Wall.

The official government investigation concluded that the engine cut out because it became too cold in the absence of the cowl flaps. Others hypothesised that Chkalov had advanced the throttle too fast and thus flooded the engine. As a result of the crash, Tomashevich and several other officials who had urged the first flight were immediately arrested.

Years later, fellow test pilot Mikhail Gromov blamed the designers for flawed engine cooling and Chkalov himself for deviating from the flight plan. Chkalov's son claimed that a plan to assassinate his father had been in the works in the months preceding his death, but the circumstances of the crash make foul play unlikely. Despite the opinion of some, after Chkalov's death Polikarpov's reputation with Stalin was left intact, and Polikarpov continued to design aircraft.

== Commemoration ==
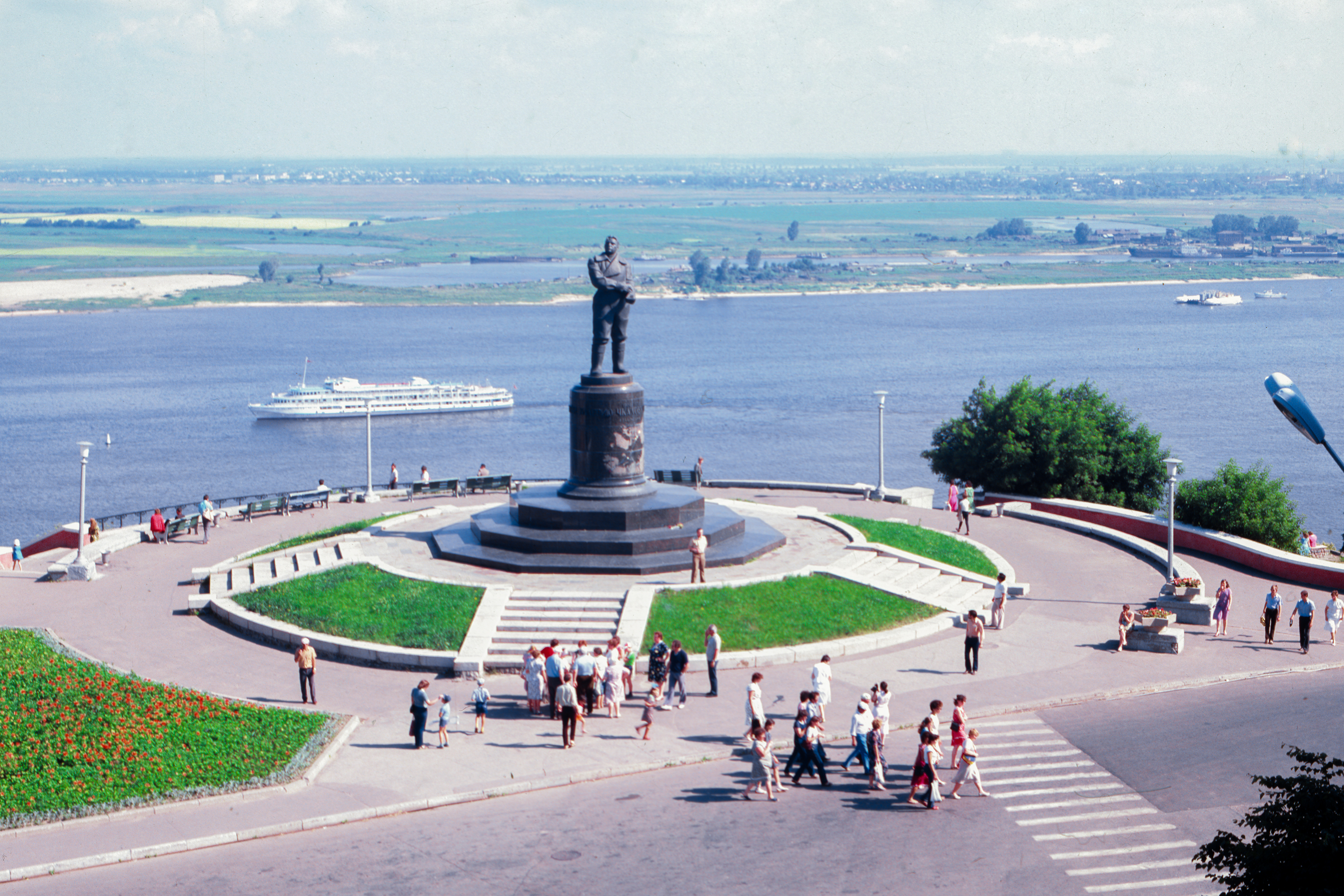
Monument to Valery Chkalov in Nizhny Novgorod, 1986

The village of Vasilyevo where Chkalov was born is now the town of Chkalovsk (Nizhny Novgorod Oblast). The city of Orenburg bore the name Chkalov from 1938 to 1957. There was a Chkalov Street in Moscow (part of Moscow's Garden Ring), now renamed Zemlyanoy Val; its namesakes in Nizhny Novgorod and several other Russian cities still exist. Nizhny Novgorod also has a staircase down to the Volga named after him with a statue of him at the top of it. In 1975, a monument to Chkalov's 1937 polar flight was dedicated at Pearson Airpark in Vancouver, Washington and a street in east Vancouver was named Chkalov Drive.

The Khatayevich Park in Dnipropetrovsk, Ukrainian SSR, was named after Chkalov from 1937 to 1992. Chkalov had no personal connection with the city.

A Chapayev-class cruiser was named Chkalov but was renamed Komsomolets in 1958.

The metro rail systems of Moscow, Saint Petersburg, and Nizhny Novgorod each have a Chkalovskaya station. Yekaterinburg Metro also opened one in 2012.

A Russian Tupolev Tu-160 bomber was named after Valery Chkalov.

A musical duet, Отряд имени Валерия Чкалова ("Detachment named after Valery Chkalov"), recorded their first album in 1983.

A monument to Chkalov in (former Dnipropetrovsk) Dnipro, Ukraine was dismantled in December 2022. The monument had been erected in 1981. In February 2023 a monument to Chkalov in Kyiv, Ukraine was dismantled. It was dismantled as soon as the Ministry of Culture and Information Policy had revoked the monument cultural heritage site status. On 13 July 2023 Valery Chkalov Park in Kyiv was renamed Literature Park.

Moldova is also home to streets named after the pilot. One of them located in the city of Chișinău, is most well known for its comically short length of 41 meters making it the shortest street in the country. However at least 3 more streets all over the country bear the pilot's name, from Găgăuzia to Lipcani and Iargara.

== See also ==
- Anatoly Serov
- Chkalov Island
