= De la Vaulx Medal =

FAI award for holders of absolute world aviation and space records

The De la Vaulx Medal is an award of the Fédération Aéronautique Internationale (FAI) presented to holders of recognized absolute world records in aeronautics and astronautics. The medal was established in 1933 in memory of Comte Henry de la Vaulx, a founder-member and former president of the FAI.

Under the FAI statutes, De la Vaulx Medals are awarded automatically to all holders of recognized absolute world records established during the preceding year, with no restriction on the number of medals that may be awarded. FAI medals and diplomas are normally presented at the opening ceremony of the organization's annual General Conference.

== History and criteria ==
The medal commemorates Comte Henry de la Vaulx, one of the founders of the FAI and a former president of the organization. De la Vaulx was killed in an aircraft accident while on a mission promoting aviation. The FAI established the medal in his memory in 1933.

Unlike FAI awards that require nominations and selection, the De la Vaulx Medal is conferred automatically when an absolute world record is recognized by the FAI. The statutes place no limit on the number of medals that may be awarded in a year.

The medal is not limited to conventional aircraft records. It has also been awarded for astronautic records, including accumulated spaceflight time and the assembled mass of spacecraft linked in flight,

== Selected recipients ==
The following is an incomplete list of recipients. The table is ordered by the year in which the qualifying absolute world record was established rather than by the year in which the medal was presented.

Record year	Recipient(s)	Record
1933	Francesco Agello	Absolute speed record of 682.08 km/h (423.82 mph) over a 3 km course, set on 10 April 1933 in a Macchi M.C.72.
1934	Francesco Agello	Absolute speed record of 709.21 km/h (440.68 mph) over a 3 km course, set on 23 October 1934 in a Macchi M.C.72.
1937	Mikhail Gromov, Andrey Yumashev and Sergey Danilin	The nonstop transpolar flight from Moscow to San Jacinto, California, which established a straight-line distance record of 10,148.5 km (6,306.0 mi).
1951	Fred Ascani	World speed record over a 100 km closed course in a North American F-86E Sabre, at approximately 635.7 mph (1,023.1 km/h).
1961	Yuri Gagarin	Three FAI-ratified world records during Vostok 1: flight duration of 1 h 48 min, altitude of 327 km (203 mi), and 4,725 kg (10,417 lb) lifted to that altitude.
1965	Robert L. Stephens	Absolute speed and altitude records in a Lockheed YF-12: 3,331.507 km/h (2,070.102 mph) over a straight 15/25 km course and 24,463 m (80,259 ft) in horizontal flight, set on 1 May 1965.
1969	Rusty Schweickart	Absolute record for duration outside a spacecraft, 47 min 1 sec, during Apollo 9.
1971	David Scott	Absolute record for total time outside a spacecraft by one crewman while on the lunar surface, 18 h 18 min 26 sec, during Apollo 15.
1974	Gerald Carr, Edward Gibson, William Pogue	Absolute spaceflight duration record of 84 d 1 h 15 min 30.8 sec and absolute distance record of 55,127,747 km (34,254,794 mi), set during Skylab 4.
1975	Vance D. Brand	Absolute records for duration, distance and altitude in group flight during the Apollo–Soyuz Test Project.
1982	Vance D. Brand	Absolute record for greatest mass lifted to altitude, 106,889 kg (235,650 lb), set by the STS-5 crew on 11 November 1982.
1986	Dick Rutan and Jeana Yeager	Absolute distance record of 40,212.14 km (24,986.67 mi) during the first nonstop, non-refuelled circumnavigation of the world by aircraft, flying the Rutan Voyager.
1994	Robert D. Cabana, Leroy Chiao	Absolute spaceflight duration record of 14 d 17 h 54 min 50 sec, set by the STS-65 crew on 23 July 1994.
1996	William F. Readdy	Absolute record for assembled mass of spacecraft linked in flight, 234,800 kg (517,600 lb), set by STS-79 and Mir 22 on 26 September 1996.
2002	Crews of STS-112 and the International Space Station	Absolute astronautic record for assembled mass of spacecraft linked in flight, 264,432.8 kg (582,975 lb), established on 18 October 2002.
2015	Alberto Porto	Absolute speed record of 323.82 km/h (201.21 mph) over a straight course, set on 16 December 2015 in a Risen, together with Sara Della Moretta.
2015	Gennady Padalka	Absolute record for accumulated spaceflight time of 878 days, 11 hours, 29 minutes and 24 seconds, reached on 12 September 2015.
2018	James M. Payne and Timothy Gardner	Absolute altitude record of 22,657 m (74,334 ft), set on 2 September 2018.
2021	Airbus Zephyr Programme	Absolute unmanned-aircraft endurance record of 454 hours and 30 minutes, set on 13 September 2021.

== See also ==
- List of aviation awards
- List of flight airspeed records
- List of flight distance records
- Louis Blériot Medal
