= Edoardo Sanguineti =

Italian writer (1930–2010)

The Honourable Edoardo Sanguineti
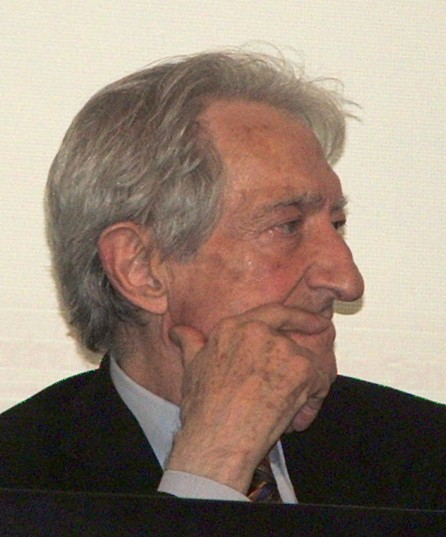
- Edoardo Sanguineti at a meeting in Genoa on lexicon and open source publications.

Member of the Italian Chamber of Deputies
- In office 15 June 1979 – 11 July 1983
- Constituency: Genoa

Personal details
- Born: 9 December 1930 Genoa, Kingdom of Italy
- Died: 18 May 2010 (aged 79) Genoa, Italian Republic
- Resting place: Monumental Cemetery of Staglieno
- Party: Italian Communist Party
- Occupation: Poet, novelist, essayist, translator
- Writing career
- Language: Italian
- Genre: Poetry, essay, short story, novel
- Literary movement: Neoavanguardia
- Notable works: Laborintus

Edoardo Sanguineti (9 December 1930 – 18 May 2010) was a Genoese poet, writer and academic, universally considered one of the major Italian authors of the second half of the twentieth century.

== Biography ==
In 1956, Sanguineti published his first poetry collection, Laborintus. The author adopted a “labyrinthine” structure in these poems, preceding the poetic sperimentalism that characterized the 1960s.

During the 1960s, he was a leader of the neo-avant-garde Gruppo 63 movement, founded in 1963 at Solunto. His work was published in the first issue of 0 to 9 magazine in 1967. He was also an active translator of Joyce, Molière, Shakespeare, Bertolt Brecht, and select Greek and Latin authors.

From 1979 until 1983, Sanguineti was a member of the Chamber of Deputies of the Italian Parliament. He was elected as an independent on the list of the Italian Communist Party.

He was an atheist.

== Death ==
Sanguineti died on 18 May 2010 at Villa Scassi Hospital in Genoa following emergency surgery for an abdominal aneurysm. He was 79.

== Works ==
- Capriccio italiano, Feltrinelli, Milano, 1963
- Il Giuoco dell'Oca, Feltrinelli, Milano, 1967
- Laborintus, Magenta, Varese, 1956
- Opus metricum, Rusconi e Paolazzi, Milano, 1960 (contains Laborintus ed Erotopaegnia)
- Triperuno, Feltrinelli, Milano, 1964 (contains Opus metricum e Purgatorio de l'Inferno)
- Natural Stories # 1 (Drama Series 16), Guernica, Toronto, 1998. Translated from: Storie Naturali #1, Feltrinelli, Milano, 1971.
- Re-spira (Breathe) poem for Antonio Papasso, 1983, MoMA, New York City
- Il colore è mio - Antonio Papasso -Retrospettiva 1999, Palazzo Comunale di Bracciano.
- Il Sonetto del foglio Volante, poem for Antonio Papasso, 2006 - Italian Air Force Museum, Vigna di Valle

== Translations ==
- J. Joyce, Poesie, Mondadori, Milano, 1961
