= Fiat AS.6 =

1920s Italian piston aircraft engine

AS.6
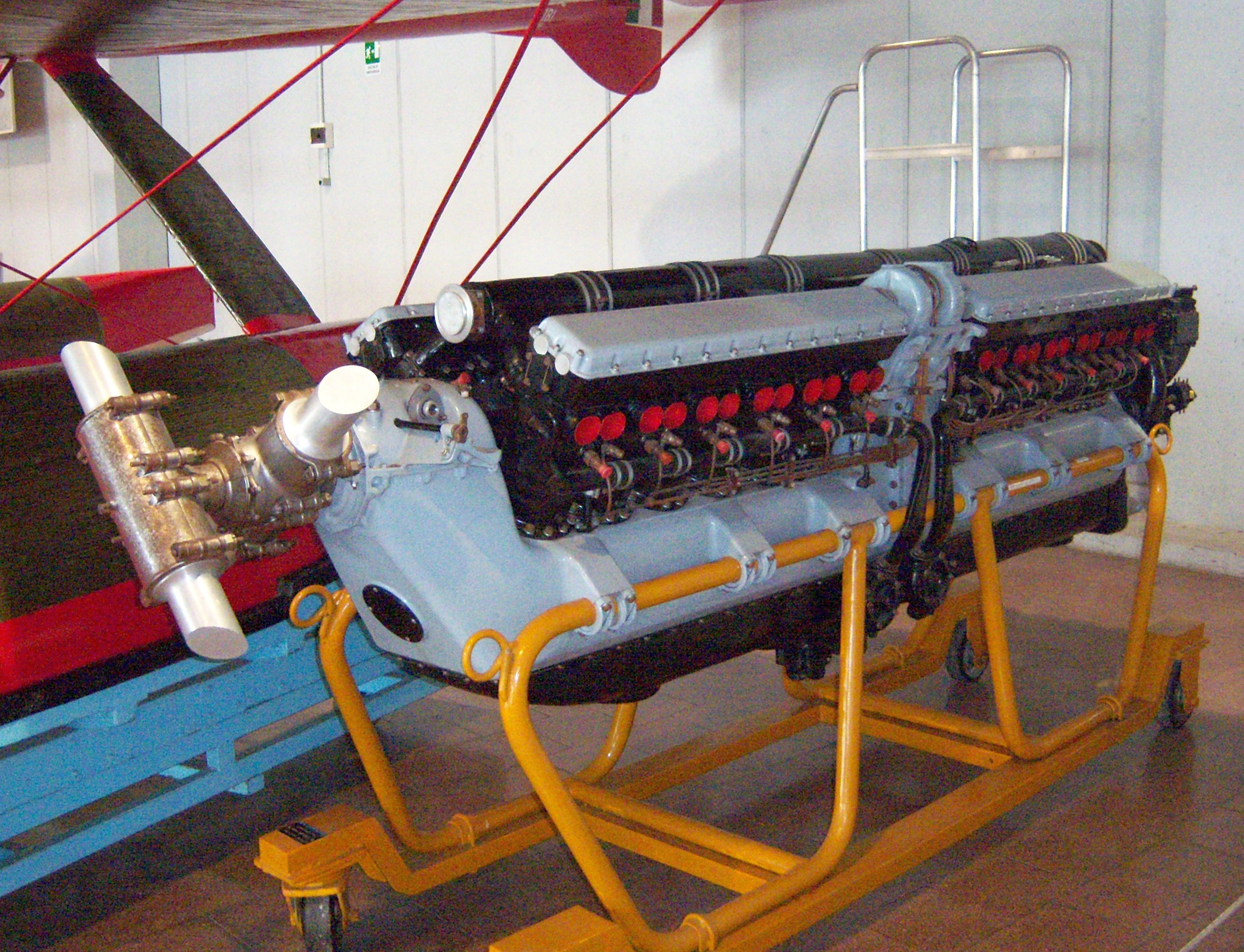
- Preserved Fiat AS.6 engine
- Type: Piston V-24 aero engine
- Manufacturer: Fiat
- First run: c. 1930
- Major applications: Macchi M.C.72
- Developed from: Fiat AS.5
- Developed into: Fiat AS.8

The Fiat AS.6 was an unusual Italian 24-cylinder, liquid-cooled V configured aircraft racing engine designed and built in the late-1920s by Fiat especially for the Schneider Trophy air races, but development and running problems meant that it was never able to compete. Although the engine suffered from technical problems, it was later used to set a speed record for piston-powered seaplanes that still stands today.

== Design and development ==
The Italian 1931 Schneider Trophy entrant, the Macchi M.C.72, required an engine of 2,300 horsepower (1,700 kW) with the capability of producing up to 2,800 horsepower (2,090 kW) while having a weight of not more than 840 kilograms (1,850 lb). The contract was awarded to Fiat, but as their most powerful V engine to that date was the 1,000-horsepower (750 kW) 12-cylinder Fiat AS.5 that had also been used for Schneider Trophy racing, the company faced a difficult challenge.

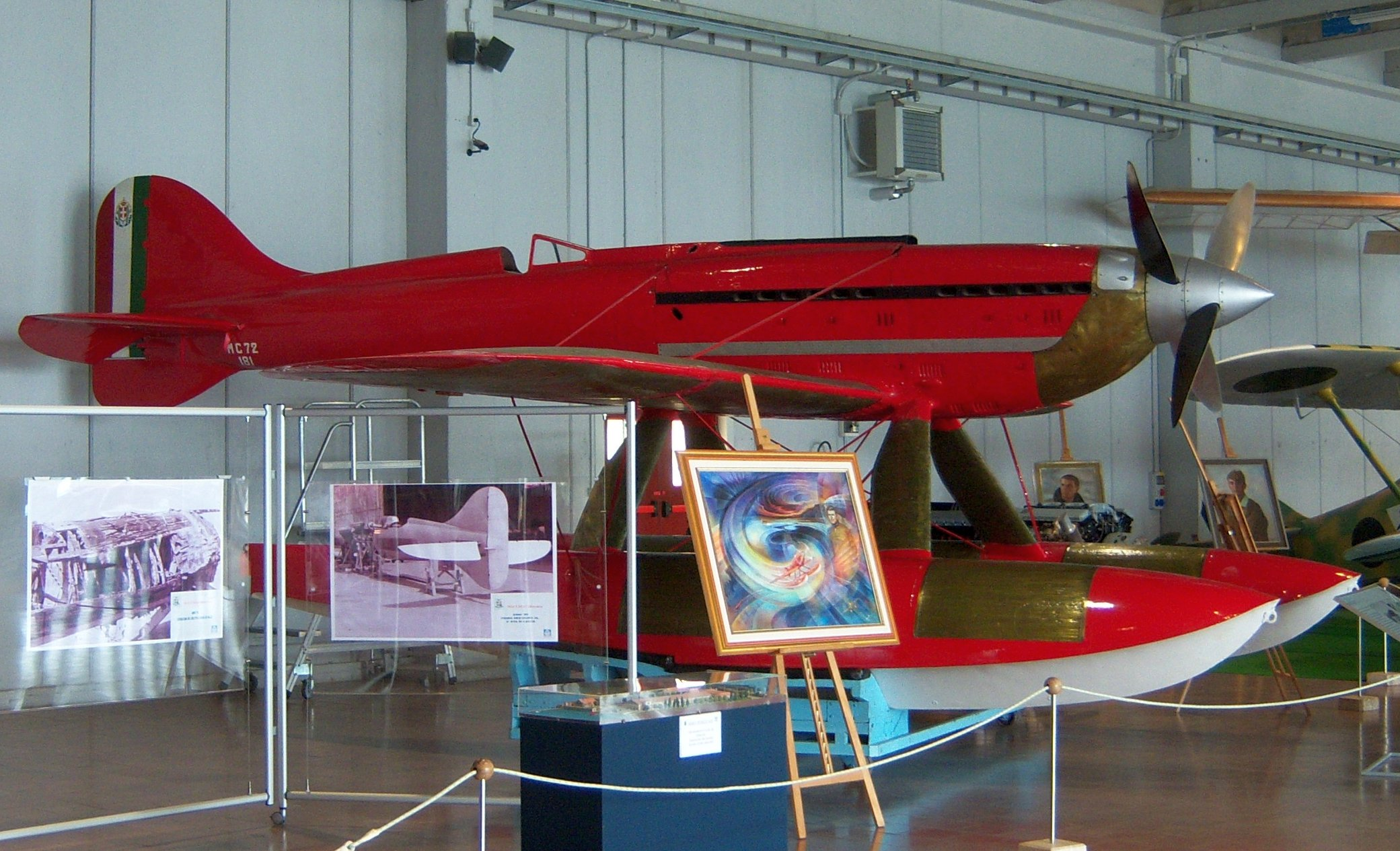
The Macchi M.C.72

The novel solution was to couple two AS.5 V12 engines in tandem to produce a V-24 with each engine independently driving one of a pair of contra-rotating propellers through co-axial shafts. Except for sharing a common mechanical supercharger, the unit was more a "tandem V12" than a true V24, which would require all cylinders to power a single crankshaft, rather than dual crankshafts rotating in opposite directions with independent crank and driveshafts, or at least to have both cranks geared together to drive a single output. The rear engine drove the front propeller through a reduction gearbox, located between the two engines, up to a shaft that passed between the cylinder banks of the reverse-mounted forward engine. The latter's crankshaft drive faced rearwards and drove the rearmost propeller in a likewise manner, but instead via a hollow shaft passing between the cylinder banks through which the rear engine driveshaft passed. A large rear-mounted mechanical centrifugal supercharger was used to boost the engine, with the fuel/air mixture being delivered to the cylinders through a manifold that was centrally mounted between the cylinder banks of both engines.

The apparent advantages were that this configuration maintained a small frontal area, and that Fiat already had previous experience with the AS.5, while having a combined displacement of 50 litres (3,066 cu in) it was thought that the power requirement would be easily met.

In practice the engine was plagued with technical problems that led to the Italian team being unable to compete in the 1931 Schneider Trophy event. On 23 October 1934 however, after backfiring problems had been solved with the assistance of the British engineer "Rod" Banks, the AS.6 was used by Francesco Agello to set a new airspeed record for piston-powered seaplanes at 709.2 kilometres per hour (440.6 mph), a record that still stands today.

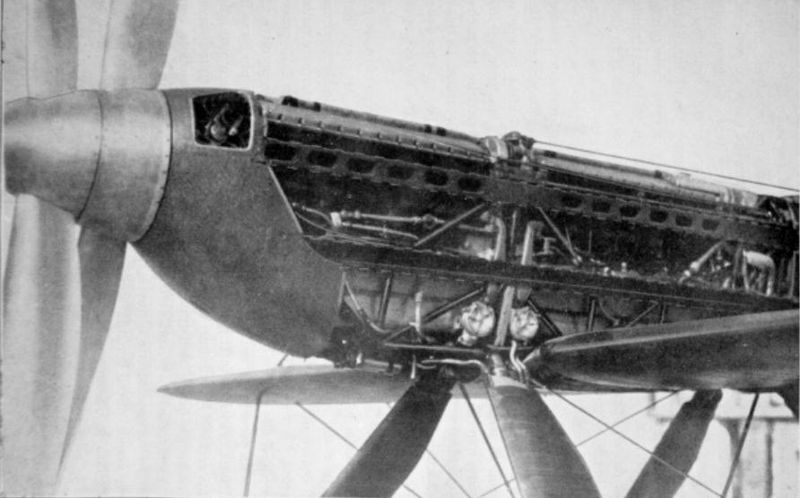
AS.6 installed in Macchi M.C.72

== Applications ==
- Macchi M.C.72

== Engines on display ==
- A Fiat AS.6 engine is on public display at the Italian Air Force Museum.
- Another AS.6 engine is on display at the Centro Storico Fiat in Turin, Italy.

== Specifications (AS.6) ==
Data from Gunston

=== General characteristics ===
- Type: 24-cylinder V-engine
- Bore: 138 mm (5.4 in)
- Stroke: 140 mm (5.5 in)
- Displacement: 50.25 L (3,066 cu in)
- Dry weight: 930 kg (2,050 lb)

=== Components ===
- Valvetrain: Two intake and two exhaust valves per cylinder
- Supercharger: Single-stage, centrifugal running at up to 19,000 rpm. Boost pressure 1.82 bar.
- Fuel system: Carburettor
- Cooling system: Liquid-cooled

=== Performance ===
- Power output: 3,100 hp (2,300 kW) at 3,300 rpm
- Compression ratio: 7:1
- Power-to-weight ratio: 2.47 kW/kg (1.5 hp/lb)

== See also ==
Comparable engines

- Rolls-Royce R

Related lists

- List of aircraft engines
