= Swiss Excellence Airplanes =

Swiss aircraft manufacturer founded in 2014

Swiss Excellence Airplanes S.A.
- Company type: Private company
- Industry: Aerospace
- Founded: 2014
- Founder: Alberto Porto
- Headquarters: Lugano, Switzerland
- Products: Ultralight aircraft
- Website: sea-avio.com

Swiss Excellence Airplanes (SEA) is a Swiss aircraft manufacturer that was founded in 2014 by Italian-Argentine aeronautical engineer Alberto Porto and is based in Lugano. The operations site is located in Pavullo nel Frignano close to the Pavullo nel Frignano Airport.

== History ==
SEA was formed by Porto Ricerca, Porto's consulting company for engineering and fluid dynamics research that has done work in the fields of aerospace, sports cars and racing sailboats.

SEA developed the Swiss Excellence Risen ultralight aircraft in 2012. The prototype was presented at the AERO Friedrichshafen show in April 2015 and it entered production in mid-2015.

In 2016 CEO Alberto Porto was awarded the Fédération Aéronautique Internationale De la Vaulx Medal for setting a speed record with the Risen. He also received an Oscar from the VFR magazine for this record.

== Aircraft ==
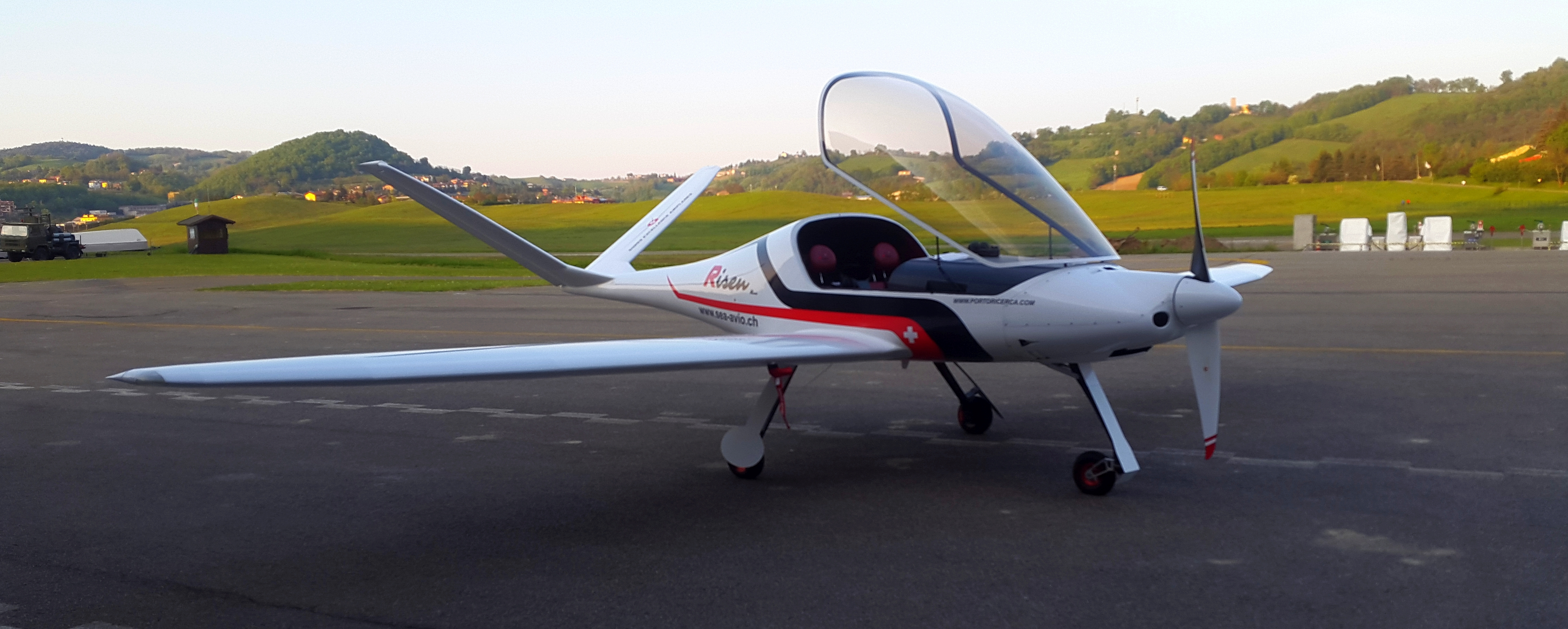
Swiss Excellence Risen

- Swiss Excellence Risen - retractable gear version
- Swiss Excellence Siren - fixed gear version
