= Fiat C.29 =

Italian racing seaplane

C.29
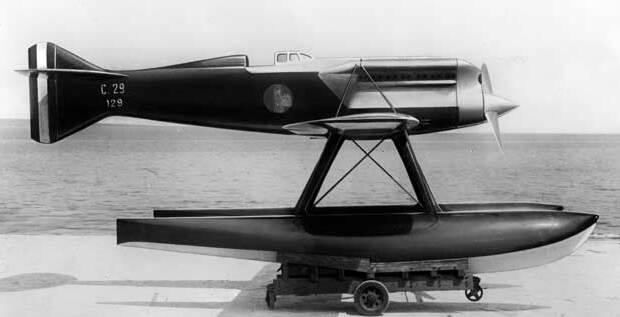

General information
- Type: Racing seaplane
- National origin: Italy
- Manufacturer: Fiat Aviazione
- Designer: Celestino Rosatelli
- Primary user: Regia Aeronautica
- Number built: 3

History
- First flight: June 1929

The Fiat C.29 was an Italian racing seaplane designed by Celestino Rosatelli and built in the late-1920s by Fiat Aviazione especially for the 1929 Schneider Trophy air race. Unused in the race, of the three aircraft built, two were destroyed in flying accidents while the third is on display in a museum.

== Design and development ==
First flown by Francesco Agello at Desenzano del Garda in early June 1929, this twin-float monoplane racer was noted to be laterally unstable. Unusually, the wing structure featured a wooden spar but was skinned with aluminium alloy sheeting. The aircraft used the Fiat AS.5 V-12 engine, specifically designed for this aircraft to minimise frontal area. On 12 June 1929, Agello hit the wash of a boat on landing which caused the first prototype, works number 129, to bounce in the air, stall and dive vertically into the water. Agello was rescued unharmed after being thrown out of the cockpit. The second prototype, 130, was quickly completed, this aircraft having larger tail surfaces to correct the stability problems.

On 12 August 1929, whilst demonstrating the aircraft to a British aviation magazine representative, the second prototype was written off after sinking back onto the water on its third attempt at a takeoff, again Agello was relatively unscathed but the aircraft was destroyed, the engine sinking 300 ft (90 m) to the bottom of Lake Garda and was never recovered. Italo Balbo ordered a third aircraft to be built, 130bis, and sent directly to England without being test-flown for the approaching Schneider Trophy competition. The C.29 did appear at RAF Calshot but did not fly during the competition, the Italian team placing second, fourth and sixth using Macchi M.52 and M.67 racers.

== Aircraft on display ==
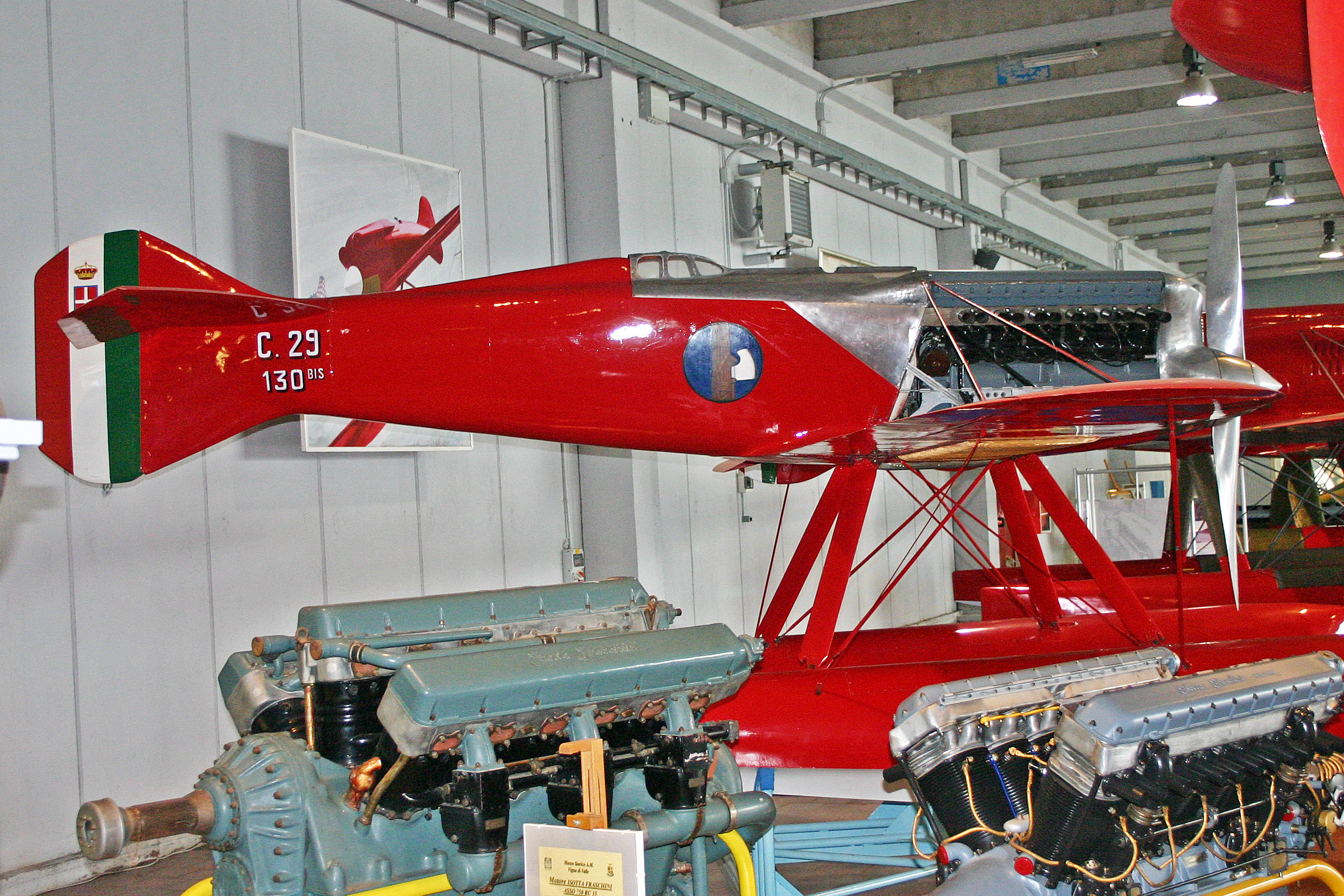
C.29 MM.130 on display at the Italian Air Force Museum

The third and sole remaining C.29 is on display at the Italian Air Force Museum.

== Operators ==
Kingdom of Italy

- Regia Aeronautica

== Specifications (C.29) ==
Data from Eves

General characteristics

- Crew: 1
- Length: 5.45 m (17 ft 11 in)
- Wingspan: 6.6 m (21 ft 8 in)
- Height: 2.75 m (9 ft 0 in)
- Wing area: 8 m^{2} (86 sq ft)
- Max takeoff weight: 1,160 kg (2,557 lb)
- Powerplant: 1 × Fiat AS.5 V-12 liquid-cooled piston engine, 750 kW (1,010 hp)
- Propellers: 2-bladed fixed-pitch propeller

Performance

- Maximum speed: 560 km/h (350 mph, 300 kn)

== See also ==
Aircraft of comparable role, configuration, and era

- Gloster IV
- Macchi M.52
- Supermarine S.5
- Supermarine S.6
