= Francis Rodwell Banks =

British automotive engineer

Air Commodore Francis Rodwell "Rod" Banks CB, OBE, Hon. CGIA., Hon. FRAeS, Hon. FAIAA., FlMechE., Flnst Pet., FRSA, CEng., MSAE, (22 March 1898 – 12 May 1985) was a British engineer who was involved in the development of the internal combustion engine, as well as special fuels for the engine, and was one of the people responsible for the development of higher-octane fuels.

== Early life ==
Francis Rodwell Banks was born on 22 March 1898, son of Bernard Rodwell and Frances Emily Banks. He married Christine Constance Grant Langlands in 1925, the couple having two daughters.

Banks entered the Royal Navy at the age of sixteen in 1914. After promotion, he commanded several coastal motor boats, his navy service ending in 1919 while on service in the Caspian Sea during the Russian Revolution.

== Interwar years ==
Between the First World War and the subsequent world conflict, Banks was involved in the development of marine diesel engines, later leading to involvement as a consultant on the problems of various car, airship, and aircraft piston engines. In 1925 he became chief experimental engineer at Peter Hooker Limited, working to develop the 1500HP 178 litre ELS 'Stromboli' airship engine. Before long, having recognised the inadequacy of existing fuels, Banks began working on development of improved fuels. His work concentrated on increasing the octane rating, which allowed the use of higher compression ratios, in particular the fuel additive tetraethyllead. In 1928, he joined the Anglo-American Oil Company and by 1930, had joined Ethyl Gasoline Corporation (export division), which, in 1931, became the Ethyl Export Corporation. This work embraced the principal aero engine and automobile manufacturers in the U.K. and Europe, including the military air forces and commercial airlines. In addition the work covered motor racing fuels. His status was such that he was invited to develop the fuels used in the UK's Schneider Trophy entrants, his fuel blends contributing to the success of the British entries in 1929 and 1931. At this time, he was also involved in developing the fuels used by Henry Segrave and John Cobb in their land and water speed record attempts. He was also instrumental in solving the problems with the Fiat AS.6 engine, enabling the world records set by the Macchi M.C.72.

In 1934 Banks presented a paper on ethyl to the Royal Aeronautical Society, for which he received the Taylor Gold Medal.

== World War II ==
With the coming of war, Banks entered the Royal Air Force Volunteer Reserve as a junior officer, being sent to work at the Aeroplane and Armament Experimental Establishment (A&AEE) at Boscombe Down. His previous work having attracted the attention of Lord Beaverbrook, Banks was accredited as a "troubleshooter" and given special powers. Banks was later promoted to air commodore and was made successively, director general of engine production (DGofEP), and director of engine research and development (DofER&D), with the objective to plan the post-war future of the aero gas turbine for both military use and commercial applications.

== Post war ==
In 1946 Banks rejoined the Ethyl Corporation (Associated Ethyl, at the time), also taking a number of directorships: loaned back as principal director of engine research and development at the Ministry of Supply in 1952, also in 1955 as a director of the Bristol Aeroplane Company, and after the merging of Bristol Aero Engines with Armstrong Siddeley, their overall director of sales in 1959. With the later mergers within the British aircraft industry, Banks became involved with the Hawker Siddeley company, in 1963 becoming assistant managing director and chief executive (civil aircraft) at Hatfield, the former home of the de Havilland Company.

By 1969 he had become the president of the Royal Aeronautical Society.

== Retirement ==
Banks retired at the age of 70, taking posts as consultants with a number of American aviation firms, with which he was still active at the age of 80.

He died in 1985, at the age of 87.

== Honours ==
- Commander of Legion of Honour (France)
- Commander of the Legion of Merit (USA)
- Military Order of St. Stanislaus (Imperial Russia),

== See also ==
- Harry Ricardo
- Octane rating
- Frank Halford
- Samuel Dalziel Heron

== Publications ==
- Air Commodore F. R. "Rod" Banks (1978). I Kept No Diary. Airlife. ISBN 0-9504543-9-7.
- Fuels and Engines – a 1939 Flight article by F. R. Banks
- Six of the Best a 1969 Flight article by F. R. Banks
- - "Air of Authority: F.R. Banks"

Professional and academic associations
Preceded by Prof David Keith-Lucas	President of the Royal Aeronautical Society; 1969-70	Succeeded by Stuart Davies
