= Andrey Yumashev =

Soviet test pilot (1902–1988)

- Андрей Борисович Юмашев
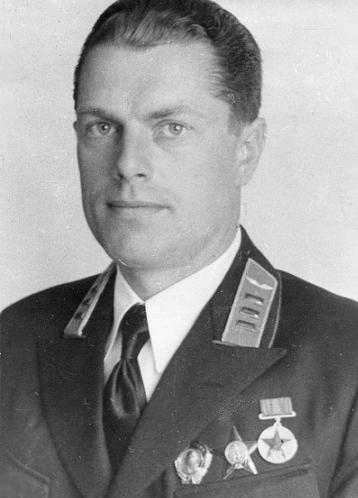
- Born: 31 March [O.S. 18 March] 1902; Saint Petersburg, Russian Empire
- Died: 20 May 1988 (aged 86); Moscow, USSR
- Military career
- Allegiance: Soviet Union
- Branch: Soviet Air Force
- Service years: 1918–1946
- Rank: General-major of Aviation
- Conflicts: Russian Civil War; World War II; Winter War; Eastern Front
- Awards: Hero of the Soviet Union

Andrey Borisovich Yumashev (Russian: Андрей Борисович Юмашев; 31 March [O.S. 18 March] 1902 – 20 May 1988) was the co-pilot of the historic Moscow-North Pole-San Jacinto flight, for which he was awarded the title Hero of the Soviet Union in 1937. Before the historic flight he worked as a test pilot, and during World War II he became a general.

== Early life ==
Yumashev was born on 31 March [O.S. 18 March] 1902 in Saint Petersburg. After graduating from school he went on to attend art school, and briefly worked as a land surveyor in summer 1918 before joining the Red Army in August that year. Before entering combat of the Russian Civil War he trained as a cadet at the 2nd Petrograd Artillery Course, and in October 1920 he was deployed to the front of the war as part of an artillery division on the Southern Front, where he participated in battles against the forces of Pyotr Wrangel and Nestor Makhno. In February 1921 he departed from the frontlines to attend additional artillery courses in Sevastopol; after graduating he was briefly being stationed in the Kharkhov Military District.

== Aviation career ==
Having transferred to the air force in 1922, he went on to graduate from the Yegorievsk Theoretical School of Pilots in 1923, followed by the 2nd Borisoglebsk Military School of Pilots and the Serpukhov School of Air Combat in 1924. During his studies he developed an interest in gliding and built a glider of his own design, the Yu-1, which he won an award for at the 3rd All-Union glider competition in Koktebel. Starting in 1926 he worked as an instructor at the Serpukhov School where he had previously attended, but in 1927 he transferred to working as a test pilot at the Air Force Research Institute, where continued to fly gliders in addition to other aircraft, setting two glider records in 1928. Having quickly worked his way up to squadron commander at the research institute, he went on to participate in several flights breaking payload records in 1936 and became a military representative in the Central Aerohydrodynamic Institute. During his work as a test pilot he participated in tests on various aircraft including the I-3, I-4, I-7, R-3, R-6, R-7, TB-1, TB-3, Stal-7, Pe-8, and ANT-9.

=== Moscow-San Jacinto flight ===
On 12 July 1937 he took off from Moscow in an ANT-25 as co-pilot alongside Mikhail Gromov and navigator Sergey Danilin for what became the record-breaking Moscow-San Jacinto flight, replacing Gromov as pilot during a portion of the flight. Despite encountering a variety of difficulties, such as having to fly blind at various points and having difficulty finding a place to land since the San Diego Airport was experiencing poor weather, they managed to safely land in a pasture near the city of San Jacinto on 14 July. In total, the flight lasted 62 hours and 17 minutes, covering 10,148 kilometers. After landing the crew went on a three-week tour of the United States, being given the status of honorary citizens of the city of Los Angeles by the mayor and meeting with president Franklin Delano Roosevelt in Washington DC.

=== Return to USSR ===
On 1 September 1937 he as well as Gromov and Danilin were awarded the title Hero of the Soviet Union. They also received the De la Vaulx Medal from the FAI. He was also elected to the Supreme Soviet of the USSR of the 1st convocation. When he returned to his work as a test pilot, he participated in the testing of the BOK-7 and BOK-15 experimental high-altitude aircraft. Later he became deputy head of the flight technical group of the People's Commissariat of Aviation Industry. During the Winter War he commanded the crew of a DB-1 bomber in the 85th Special Purpose Aviation Regiment, but few only six sorties.

=== World War II ===
At the time of the German invasion of the Soviet Union, Yumashev commanded the 2nd Fighter Squadron of Moscow Air Defense. However, he soon left the country in August on an official trip to in United States to help the purchase of aircraft and aviation equipment for the USSR. Having returned to the USSR, he went on to briefly serve as commander of the 237th Fighter Aviation Regiment in January 1942 before moving on to serve as deputy commander of the air force on the Kalinin Front. In May he became the deputy commander of the 3rd Air Army, and in September 1942 he was posted as deputy commander of the air forces of the Western Front. Made commander of the 2nd Fighter Aviation Corps in February 1943, the next month he was promoted to the rank of general-major. In that capacity, he participated in the battles for Voroshilovgrad and Kharkov, but in July he was transferred to be commander of fighter aviation of the Eastern Air Defense Front. In April 1944 he was assigned to the same post on the Western Front, where he remained until February 1945. He then headed the Fighter Aviation Directorate and later the Frontline Aviation Combat Training Directorate of the Air Force Main Combat Training Directorate. During the war he led projects to give air cover to important military sites, and participated in the preparations for the offensives on Königsberg and Berlin.

== Later life ==
Having retired from the military in October 1946 for health reasons, Yumashev lived in Moscow but spent a lot of his time at a dacha in Alupka, and soon began his art career, joining the Union of Artists that year. Later on he made several trips to Central Asia with Robert Falk to do paintings of historic monuments in Samarkand and Bukhara. Exhibitions of his paintings were held in Moscow, Alupka, Obninsk, and San Jacinto. He died in Moscow on 20 May 1988 and was buried in the Vagankovo Cemetery.

== Awards ==
- Hero of the Soviet Union (1 September 1937)
- Two Order of Lenin (1 September 1937 and 21 February 1945)
- Five Order of the Red Banner (21 March 1940, 29 March 1944, 3 November 1944, 18 August 1945, 30 August 1945)
- Order of the Patriotic War 1st class (11 March 1985)
- Order of the Red Star (17 August 1933)
- Medal "For Military Merit" (28 October 1967)
- FAI De la Vaulx Medal (1937)
- campaign and jubilee medals
