= Italian Air Force Museum =

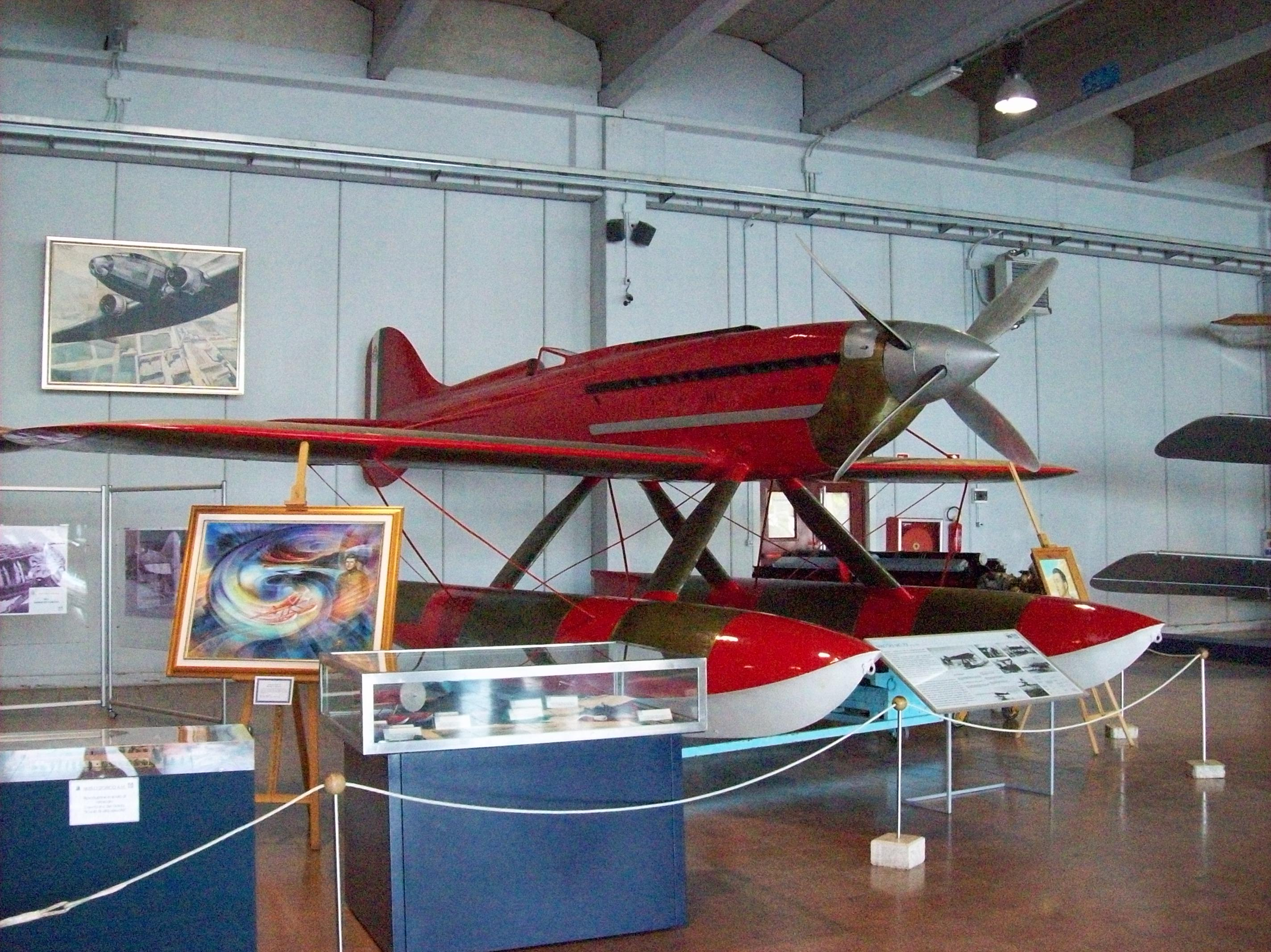
- Established: 1977
- Location: Bracciano
- Coordinates: 42.085049°N 12.217108°E
- Type: Aviation museum
- Director: Ten. Col. Pierluigi Poletti
- Website: Italian Air Force Museum

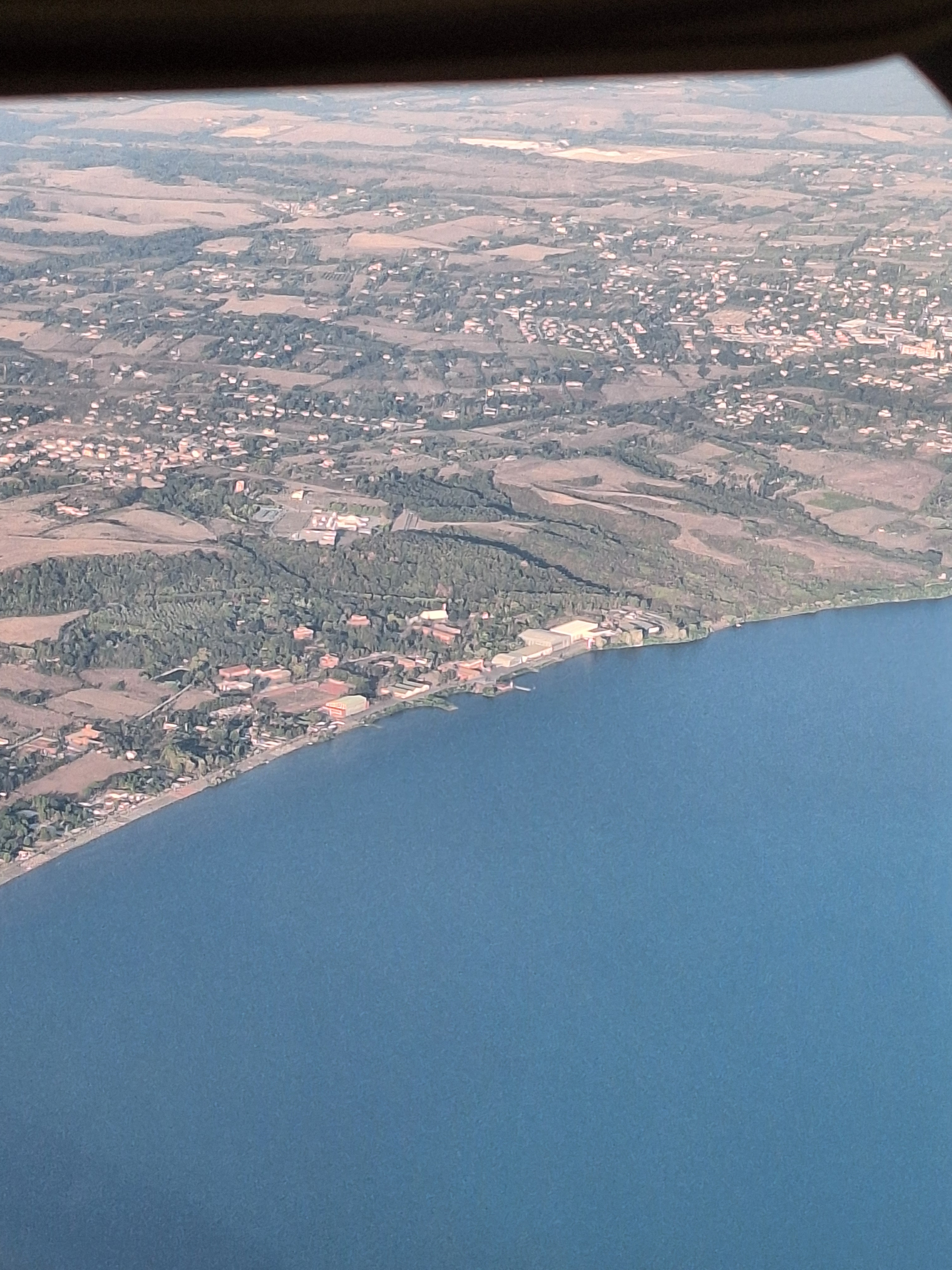
Aerial view of museum

The Italian Air Force Museum is an aircraft museum at Vigna di Valle, on Lake Bracciano (Lazio), in central Italy. It is operated by the Aeronautica Militare. The museum's collection has an emphasis on Italian machines and seaplanes. While maintaining the technical and historical aspects, the museum is also dedicated to the influence aviation has had on Italian art, featuring works by Futurist painters Pietro Annigoni, Giacomo Balla, and Tato; and contemporary art such as Flight: Papiers froissés (literally crumpled paper) by Antonio Papasso.

== Collection ==
=== Propeller aircraft ===
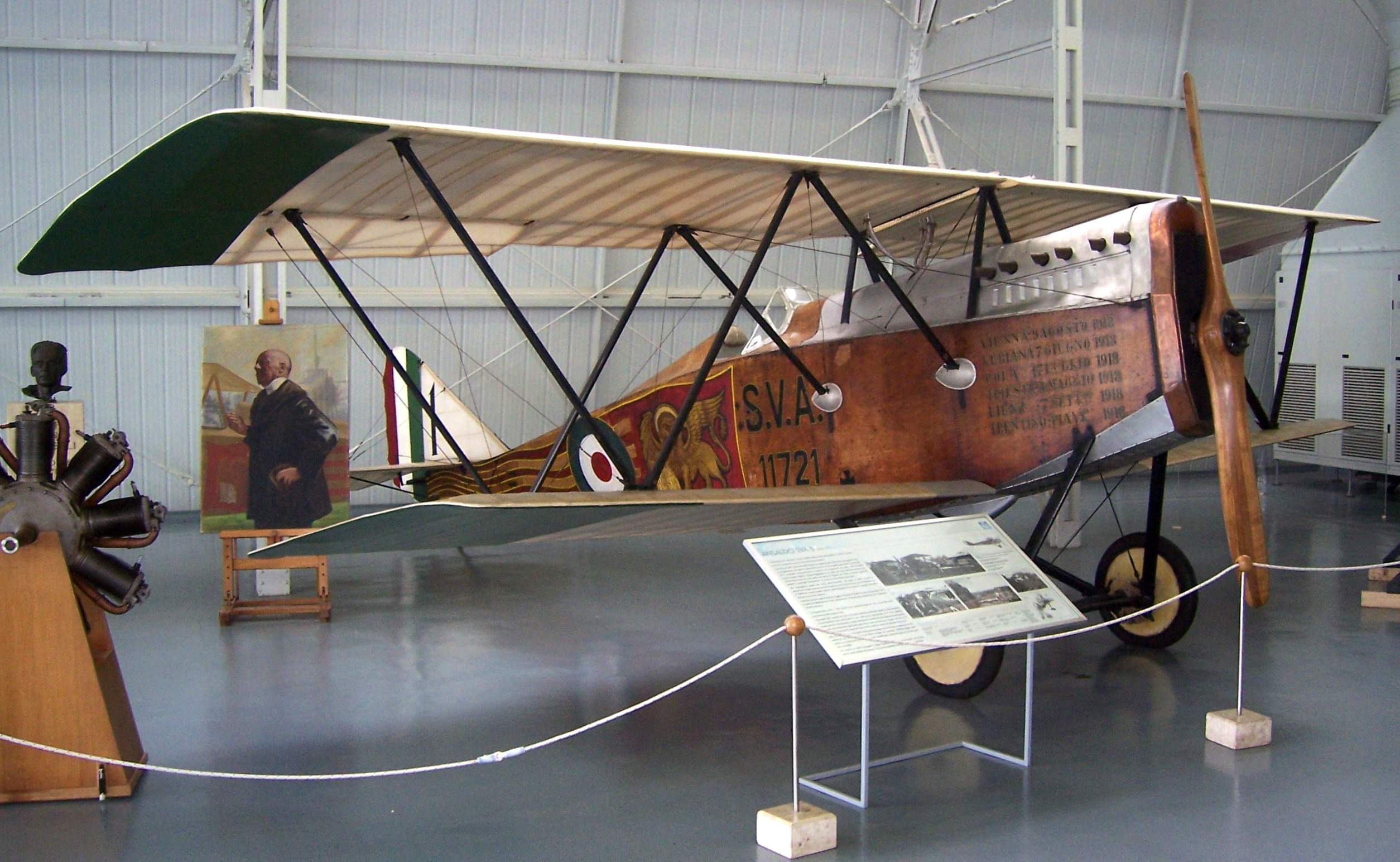
Ansaldo SVA 5

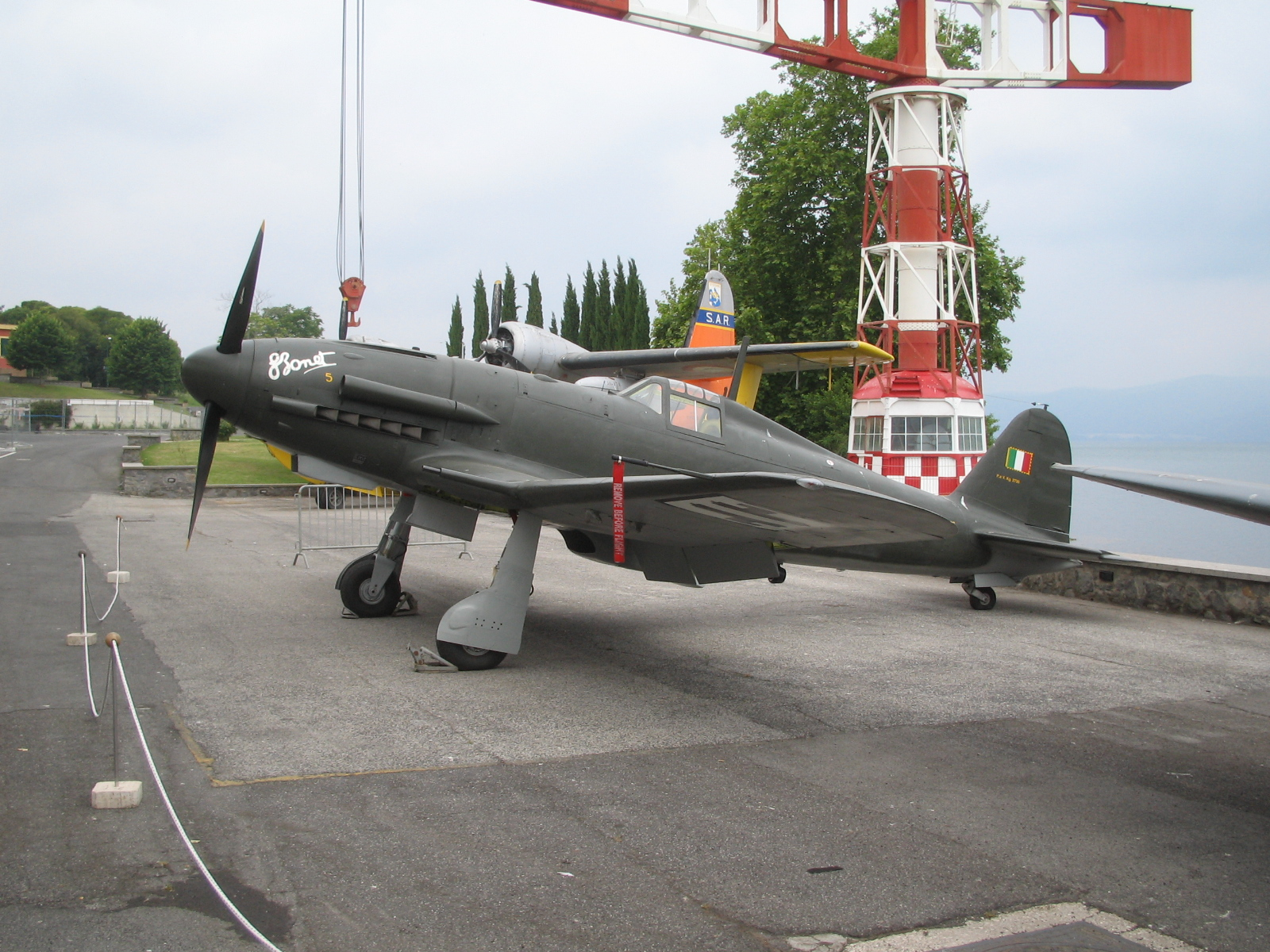
Fiat G.55 of ANR (background with lake Bracciano)

- Ansaldo AC.2
- Ansaldo SVA 5
- Blériot XI
- Caproni Ca.3
- Caproni Ca.100
- Cant Z.506S Airone
- Douglas C47A Skytrain
- Reggiane Re.2002 Ariete
- Fiat C.29
- Fiat CR.32
- Fiat CR.42 Falco
- Fiat G.49
- Fiat G.55
- Fiat G.59 4B
- Fiat G.212
- Fieseler Fi 156
- Grumman HU-16A Albatross
- Grumman S2F-1 Tracker
- IMAM Ro.37 bis
- IMAM Ro.41 (under restoration)
- IMAM Ro.43
- Junkers J.I (fuselage only)
- Lohner L
- Macchi M.B.308
- Macchi MB.323
- Macchi M.39
- Macchi M.67
- Macchi M.416
- Macchi-Castoldi MC.72
- Macchi-Hanriot HD.1
- Macchi MC.200
- Macchi MC.202
- Macchi MC.205
- Nardi FN.305
- North American P-51D
- North American T-6J
- Piaggio P.166 ML-1
- SAI Ambrosini S.7
- Savoia-Marchetti S.56
- Savoia-Marchetti SM.79
- Savoia-Marchetti SM.82
- SIAI Marchetti SF.260M
- Spad VII
- Stinson L-5 Sentinel
- Supermarine Spitfire Mk IX
- Wright N°4 (1960s built airworthy replica)

=== Gliders ===
- Libratore Allievo Cantù
- CVV-6 Canguro Pallas

=== Jet aircraft ===
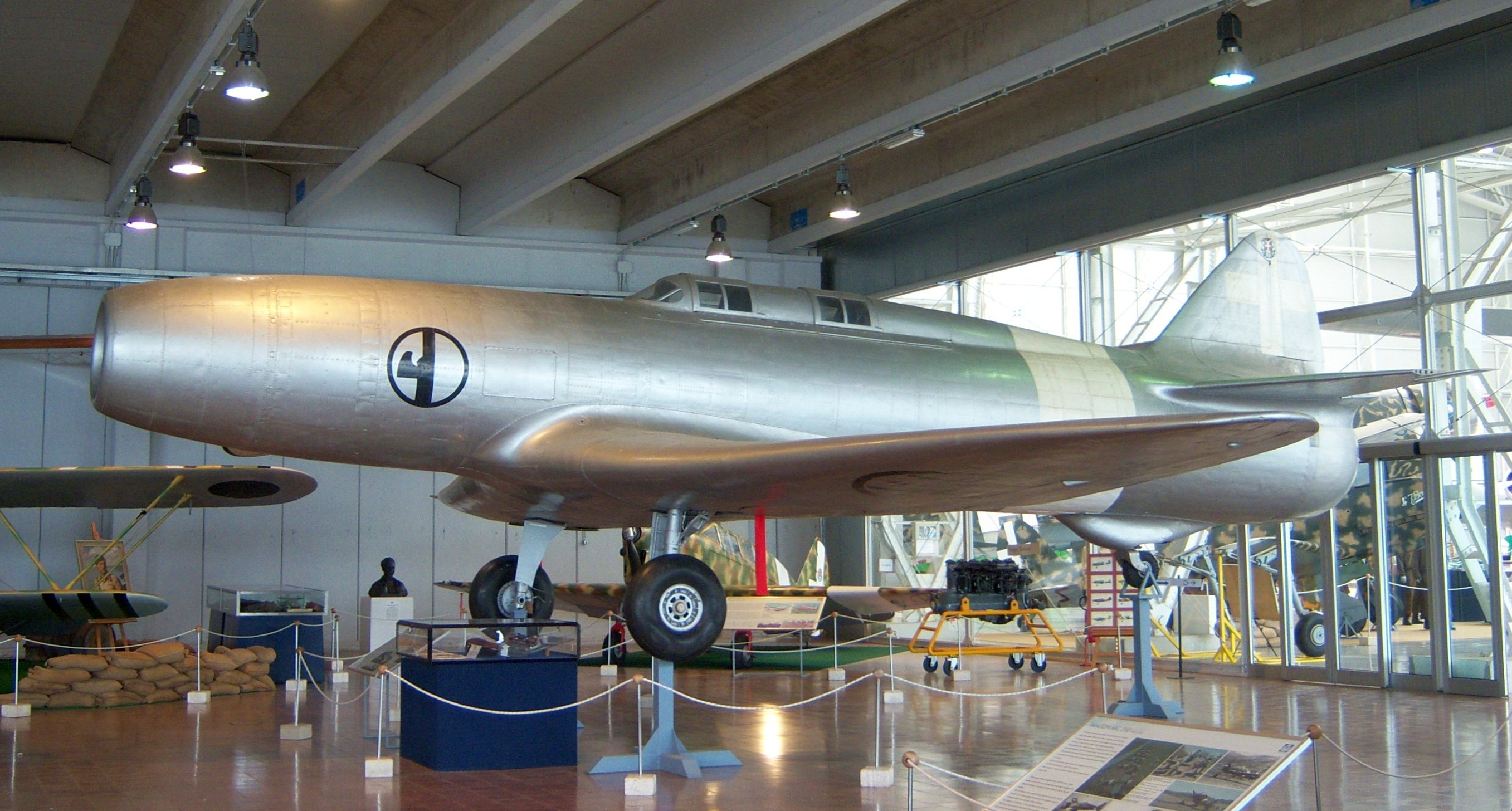
Campini-Caproni C.C.2

- Aerfer Ariete
- Aerfer Sagittario 2
- Aermacchi MB-326
- Aermacchi MB-339PAN
- Canadair CL-13 Sabre
- Campini-Caproni C.C.2
- de Havilland DH-113 Vampire NF54
- Fiat G.80-3B
- Fiat G.91 PAN (Frecce Tricolori)
- Fiat G.91 R
- Fiat G.91 T
- Fiat G.91 Y
- Lockheed (Fiat) F-104G Starfighter
- Lockheed RT-33
- North American-Fiat F-86K Sabre
- Panavia Tornado F3
- Panavia Tornado IDS
- Eurofighter Typhoon
- AMX A-11
- Piaggio PD.808
- Republic F-84F Thunderstreak
- Republic F-84G Thunderjet
- Republic RF-84F Thunderflash (under restoration)
- Saab J29 Tunnan (only included plane never operated by Italian Air Force)

=== Helicopters ===
- Aer Lualdi L.59
- Agusta Bell AB.204 B
- Agusta Bell AB.47 G2
- Agusta Bell AB.47J Ranger
- Agusta Sikorsky SH-3D/TS "Pope Helicopter"

=== Engines ===
==== Piston engines ====
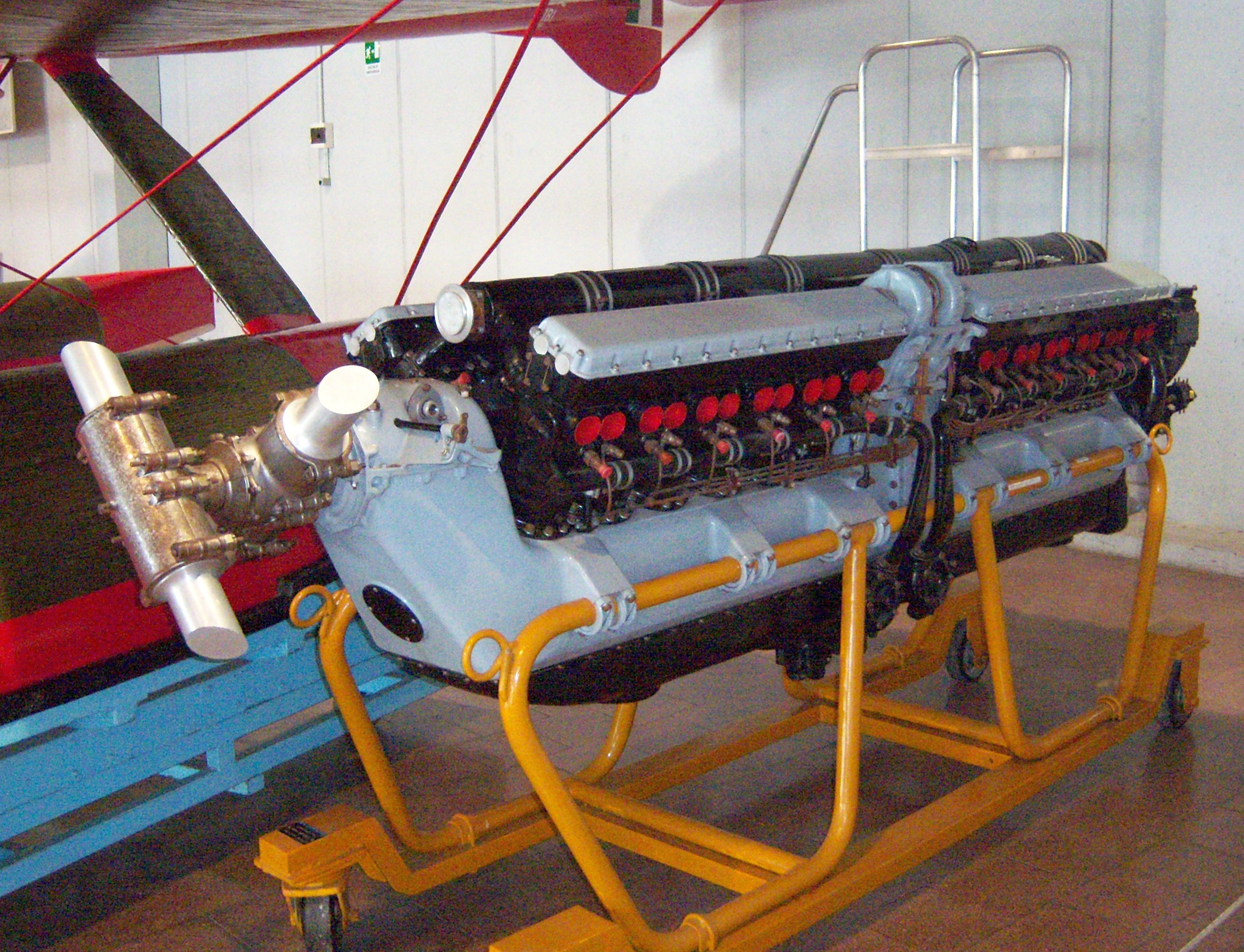
Fiat AS.6

- Alfa Romeo 126 RC.34
- Allison V-1710
- Argus As10C
- Daimler-Benz DB 605
- Fiat A.20
- Fiat A.22T
- Fiat A.24
- Fiat A.54
- Fiat AS.6
- Fiat AS.8
- Hispano-Suiza 8
- Isotta Fraschini 12 DB
- Isotta Fraschini Asso 750 RC 35
- Maybach-Zeppelin Luftschiffmotor
- Rolls-Royce Merlin
- SPA 6A
- SPA Faccioli
- Wright "Type 4"

==== Jet engines ====
- General Electric J47
- Junkers Jumo 004
- Wright J65

== See also ==
- List of aerospace museums

== Sources ==
- Italian Air Force Museum
