= Swiss Excellence Risen =

Swiss ultralight aircraft

Risen
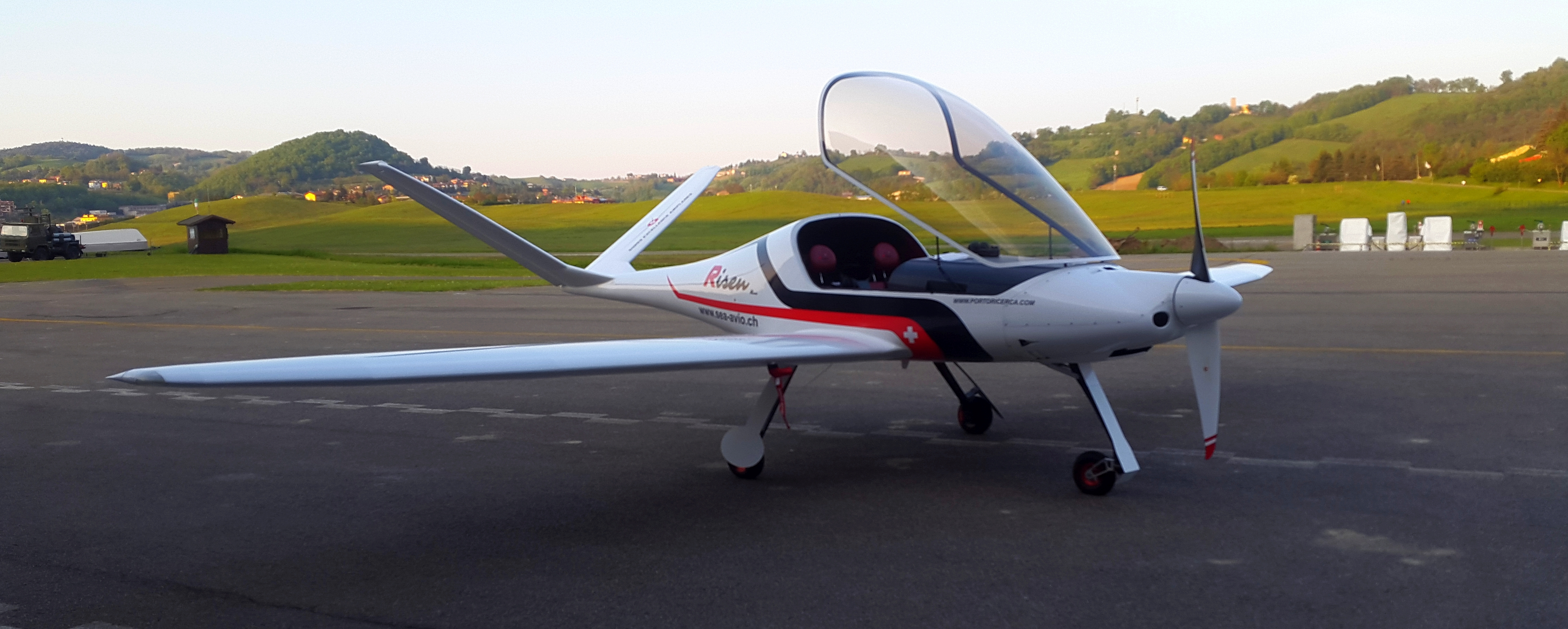

General information
- Type: Ultralight aircraft
- National origin: Switzerland
- Manufacturer: Swiss Excellence Airplanes
- Designer: Alberto Porto
- Status: In production

History
- Manufactured: mid-2015-present
- Introduction date: 2015
- First flight: 2012

The Swiss Excellence Risen is a Swiss two-seat in side-by-side configuration, low wing ultralight aircraft, designed by Italian-Argentine aeronautical engineer Alberto Porto and produced by Swiss Excellence Airplanes. The aircraft was introduced at the 2015 AERO Friedrichshafen show. It is supplied ready-to-fly.

== Design and development ==
The prototype was completed in 2012 and tested over the next three years before being publicly shown in 2015. The design entered production in mid-2015.

The aircraft has a glass cockpit, motorized canopy, autopilot, retractable landing gear and a ballistic parachute. The main structure is made from carbon fibre. Available engines are 75 kW (100 hp) Rotax 912 ULS and Rotax 912 iS and the 86 kW (115 hp) Rotax 914 turbocharged powerplant.

In 2020 the aircraft's gross weight was increased from 472.5 to 600 kg (1,041.7 to 1,322.8 lb).

== Operational history ==
In 2016 the design set an FAI Class R (Microlights and paramotors) world speed record for absolute speed of 323.82 km/h (201 mph) with a standard Rotax 912 engine. For this record the pilot Alberto Porto, who is also the CEO of Swiss Excellence Airplanes, received an Oscar from VFR Magazine and the De la Vaulx Medal by the FAI.

The FAI records table lists the Risen as having flown at the speed of 428.18 km/h (266 mph) over a straight course on Jan 22, 2023.

== Variants ==
Swiss Excellence Risen
Model with retractable landing gear
Swiss Excellence Siren
Model with fixed landing gear and revised cockpit arrangement.

== Specifications (Risen 915iSV) ==
Data from manufacturer

General characteristics

- Crew: one
- Capacity: one passenger
- Length: 6.80 m (22 ft 4 in)
- Wingspan: 8.20 m (26 ft 11 in)
- Wing area: 8.50 m^{2} (91.5 sq ft)
- Empty weight: 350 kg (772 lb)
- Max takeoff weight: 625 kg (1,378 lb)
- Fuel capacity: two 60 L (16 US gal; 13 imp gal) fuel tanks
- Powerplant: 1 × Rotax 915 4-cylinder horizontally-opposed air-cooled piston engine, 105 kW (141 hp)

Performance

- Maximum speed: 390 km/h (240 mph, 210 kn) at 9000 ft, true airspeed
- Cruise speed: 365 km/h (227 mph, 197 kn) at 75% power, 9000 ft, true airspeed
- Stall speed: 78 km/h (48 mph, 42 kn)
- Never exceed speed: 380 km/h (240 mph, 210 kn) indicated airspeed
- Range: 1,550 km (960 mi, 840 nmi)
- g limits: +5.o g / -3.0 g
- Maximum glide ratio: 20:1
- Rate of climb: 10 m/s (2,000 ft/min)

Avionics

- three Dynon Avionics touch monitors
