= Antonio Papasso =

Italian painter and engraver (1932–2024)

Antonio Papasso (11 July 1932 – 8 February 2014) was an Italian painter and engraver.

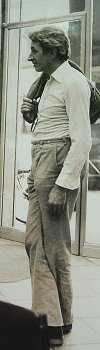
Antonio Papasso

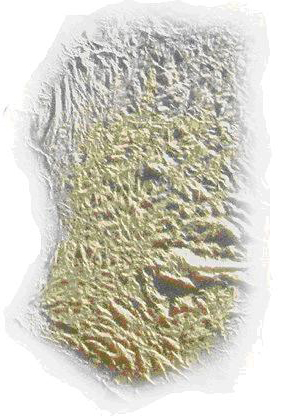
PAPIER froissé 1975-collection BNF

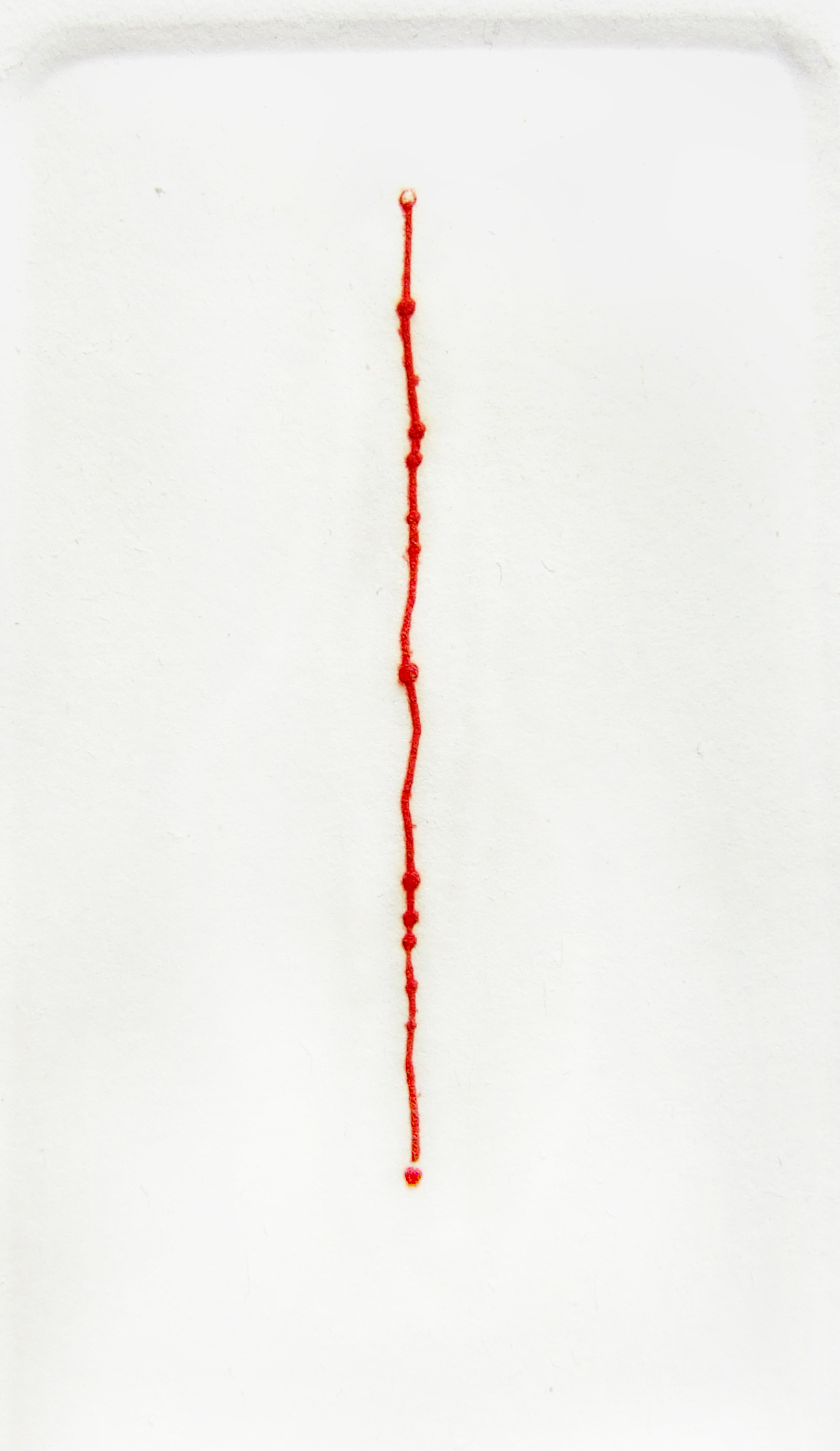
folio n°2-rhythm- of Re/spira (Breathe) 1982 etching in color-collection MoMA

== Biography ==
Papasso was born in Florence on 11 July 1932, as the second son of Giovanni and Aldina Lollini. He had a sister, Giovanna. In 1939–1940, the family moved to Viareggio. After the war Papasso worked for an electric utility.

In the second half of the 1950s, he set up an appliance store in Viareggio. His interest in painting started at the beginning of 1968. He then attended evening classes on art history and decided to become a painter.

In 1970, he moved to Pisa and rented a farm-house, to work on action painting. He then met members of the new literary avant-garde Gruppo 63 and worked with Edoardo Sanguineti and Alfredo Giuliani.

In 1971–1972, he decided to undergo a test inspired by the aphorism "I’ve never seen colors fighting each other" by Picasso. He painted watercolors and figurative etchings, employing contrasting and harsh colors and signed them with the pseudonym of ANTIGONE. Some of these works are now in the collections of the Bibliothèque nationale de France (BNF) – Paris.

Papasso became frustrated with his work and stopped painting after producing a collection of five etchings called Genealogia.

In 1975, while he was printing Genealogia, he chanced on some crumpled paper (papier froissé).

...Papasso), starting from scratch, with a thin sheet of tissue paper crumpled repeatedly with the warmth of the hands, pursues a mode of germinal matter. He would like to add to his work the energy that erupts from its nature ...

In 1978, the first papiers froissé were presented by Claudio Di Scalzo at Galleria 9 colonne in Trento. In 1979, they were exhibited and introduced by an essay by Roberto Sanesi at Galleria Zarathustra in Milan and again in 1980 at the art gallery Greminger in Genoa. Alongside etchings and prints, Papasso continued to experience papiers froissé. In 1981, the historian Gillo Dorfles presented the last papiers froissés in Milan at Galleria Zarathustra together with the collection of original prints entitled Sing,

In the same year he moved to Anguillara Sabazia, on Lake Bracciano, in Rome's north area.

In 1982, Papasso issued a collection of seven color etchings called Respira (Breath) (Metropolitan Museum of Modern Art (MoMA)) accompanied by a triple acrostic by Edoardo Sanguineti, with credits by Riccardo Barletta, Fausto Curi, Luigi Ferrarino and a letter by MoMA. In 1983, this work was acquired by MoMA.

In 1983, the artist issued three color etchings called Storia (invecchiamento) written by Alfredo Giuliani. In the same year he produced six etchings Forma Naturae (Archetipi & C) with an essay by Giulio Carlo Argan. In 1986, he published the collection called Una "mina" nella memoria (A “mine" in the memory) accompanied by the poem Videogramma volteggio (“Videogram-vaulting") by Elio Filippo Accrocca. In 1989 he exhibited his works at the Charlton gallery in Rome with catalog presented for the second time by Gillo Dorfles.

Later he exhibited his works of art at Toninelli-Arte-Moderna in Rome and in 1993 Foire Internationale d'art Contemporain (FIAC) held at the Grand Palais in Paris.

In 1992, he published a collection of color etchings Promemoria-Pro/memoria accompanied by an essay by Edoardo Sanguineti.

In 1999, he exhibited a retrospective entitled Il colore è mio (The color is mine) in Bracciano.

In 2004, Tommaso Lisa, member of the Italian Studies Department of the University of Florence, introduced Papasso in the book Pretesti Ecfrastici, collaborating with Sanguineti and other artists.

In 2005, Papasso was invited to exhibit a retrospective of his works at the Museo d'Arte Contemporanea La Sapienza University of Rome. The exhibition was accompanied by an essay, Antonio Papasso – il tutto e il niente (“Antonio Papasso – everything and nothing") edited by Claudio Di Scalzo. In 2006, Papasso was invited to exhibit all of his works from 1975 to 2006 at the Italian Air Force Museum (MUSAM – Vigna di Valle) in Bracciano. The exhibition was accompanied by Papasso's essay, Elogio del leggero (In praise of lightness), together with an appendix and a movie directed by Riccardo Barletta. Sanguineti contributed a poem dedicated to Papasso called Sonetto del foglio volante (Sonnet loose sheet).

Papasso died on 8 February 2014, at the age of 81.

== Public collections ==
=== Original prints, etchings and collected papiers froissés ===
- Papier froissé 1975 – BNF – Paris
- Genealogi 1975 – 5 etchings – Text by Aldo Cairola – Siena
- Cant 1981 – 6 color etchings in color, afterword by Dorfles – Gabinetto Disegni e Stampe, Rome – Stedelijk Museum, Amsterdam
- Respira (Breath) 1982 – 7 etchings in color and triple acrostic by Edoardo Sanguineti – BNF, Paris; MoMA, New York• "RACCONTO" 1983 – 3 etchings taken from a poem by Alfredo Giuliani BNF – Paris
- Forma Naturae (Archetipi & C), 1984 – 6 etchings in color – text by Giulio Carlo Argan – BNF – Paris
- Una "mina" nella memoria 1986 – folder with 3 small papiers froissés – Poetry by Elio Filippo Accrocca – BNF – Paris
- Promemoria/Pro-Memoria 1987 –3 etchings in color – Acrostic Edoardo Sanguineti short – BNF – Paris
- Volo 2006-PAPIER FROISSÉ – Italian Air Force Museum – MUSAM – Vigna di Valle, -Bracciano, (RM)
- Effervescenza – (s.d.) – etching + papier froissé - BNF – Paris
- Volo 2006 – etching-acquatint + collage – BNF – Paris
- Volo (s.d.) – etching + acquatint + papier froissé – BNF – Paris

=== Prints of original figurative Antigone (pseudonim of Antonio papasso) ===
- Cavallo 1970/1975 – color etching and aquatint – BNF – Paris.
- Cavalli In Corsa 1992 – color etching and aquatint – BNF – Paris.
- Mucche Al Pascolo 1970/1975 – color etching and aquatint – BNF – Paris.
- Tra Le Dune 1975 – color etching and aquatint – BNF – Paris.
- Cavallo 1976 – color etching and aquatint – BNF – Paris.
- Cavalli 1980 – color etching and aquatint – BNF – Paris.
- Cavalli A Lago 1970/1997 – color etching and aquatint – BNF – Paris.

=== Selected exhibitions ===
- 1975, Gallery "il Salotto", Como.
- 1976, "Municipal schools", Vecchiano (Pisa).1977, Gallery "Metastasio", Prato (Firenze).
- 1978, Gallery "9 Colonne", Trento.
- 1979, Gallery "Zarathustra", Milan. •1980, Gallery "Greminger", Genova.
- 1981, "City of Montignoso", Massa
- 1981, "Alternative Museum Remo Brindisi", Spina (Ferrara).
- 1982, "Gallery Zarathustra", Milan.
- 1984, "European Triennale of Engraving", Grado, Friuli-Venezia Giulia.
- 1985, "International Biennial of Engraving ", Ljubljana.
- 1988, Gallery "Forum", Hamburg; Gallery "Vigadò", Budapest.
- 1989, Gallery "Charlton", Rome.
- 1992, "Toninelli Modern Art", Rome
- 1992, "Toninelli Modern Art"; FIAC, Grand Palais, Parigi.
- 1993, "Toninelli Arte Moderna", Rome; SAGA Grand Palais, Parigi.
- 1994, "Palais des Festivals", Cannes.
- 1995, "Arte Jonction", Cannes. •1999, "Town Hall", Bracciano (Rome).
- 2004, "University of Florence" – Department of Italian Art
- 2005, "Museo Contemporary Art (MLAC) of the La Sapienza", Rome;
- 2006, "Italian Air Force Museum", Vigna di Valle, Bracciano (Rome).

== Bibliography ==
- Aldo Cairola: 1976 essay for ”GENEALOGIA”, Gall. Metastasio, Prato.• Miklos N. Varga: “GENEALOGIA of Papasso”, Gala, Milan 1978.
- Roberto Sanesi in 1979 presents the PAPIER crumpled in Milan at the gallery Zarathustra, with an engraving entitled "Stultifera" and in 1980 in Genoa, at the gallery Greminger.
- Mario Perazzi, "out of the shell of the Egg" The Day, Milan, 1981.
- Germano Beringheli: essay for, "THE FLOW OF CONSCIOUSNESS ", Genova 1980.
- Luigi Ferrarino: for Papasso, "THE CONCEPT OF LABORATORY", Pisa 1983.
- Giulio Carlo Argan: essay for "FORMA NATURAE (Archetipi & C.)", Rome. 1986.• 1984 (invited)three-year European engraving, Grado, Friuli-Venezia Giulia
- (invited)International Engraving Biennial, Ljubljana
- Remo Brindisi: essay for exhibition at the Museum Remo Brindisi, Spina, (Ferrara), 1978.
- Edoardo Sanguineti: Publications and dedications of poetry readings of the images: "PRO-MEMORIA PROMEMORIA"; *"PENSIERINI PER PAPASSO ANTONIO" accompanying the exhibition "The color is my" the city of Bracciano and printmaking collections: the literary part published in Volume “Il gatto lupesco” pagg.147, 1982–166, 1987–431, 1998 Feltrinelli editore, Milan ISBN 88-07-53005-8.
- Edoardo Sanguineti: collection of engravings of 7 original prints "RE/SPIRA" (Breath) by Antonio Papasso accompanied by a triple acrostic (reading of poetic images) by E. Sanguineti, Feltrinelli, Milan, 1982 ISBN 88-07-53005-8
- Gillo Dorfles three essays (PAPIER Froissé): Milan 1981 for the collection of engravings "CANTA" (afterword); personal Gallery Zarathustra Milan 1981.
- Once upon a time Lucio Fontana... Once upon a time Giorgio Morandi ... They say that history, even that art does not repeat itself ...... Magic, charm, amazement, three feelings translated into aesthetic form Signed: Corriere della Sera, 14 June 1981
- CIMAISE, Parigi 1982; Volume 29, N ° 156/157 Février- Mars-Avril 1982. Riccardo Barletta:"Du stile à la recherche libre à l'archetipo", pag 12–14: Carmelo Strano: "a propos de Antonio Papasso Il "comportamentismo" di sensibilità, da pag 81 a pag. 88
- Exhibition Gall. Charlton, Rome 1989.
- Solo exhibition Gall. Zarathustra Milan 1981
- Lettere dal MoMA: It was accepted at the Committee's 25 May meeting ... The members of the Committee were unanimously enthusiastic about your etchings....The members of the Committee were delighted to acquire this intimate book. This gift a welcome one and broadens our knowledge of contemporary Italia printmaking. The trustees join me extending warmest thanks for your generosity and interest in the Museum. Janet Stern chairman Ft. MoMA-N. Y. 1983
- Exhibition Charlton Gallery, Rome 1989.
- Carlo Madrignani: essay “ CIRCULARITY”, Pisa, 1988.
- Elio Filippo Accrocca: Papasso poem "VIDEO-RECORDING-VAULTING" to "UNA MINA NELLA MEMORIA", Rome 1986; essay on Antigone (pseudonym), 1989;
- Gillo Dorfles, The essay "A legend personal and secret", Rome 1989
- Claudio Di Scalzo:essay, "RUMPLING PAPASSO", Trento 1979 and ” EVERYTHING AND ANYTHING", Rome, Gangemi Editor,ISBN 88-492-0930-4, 2005

Tommaso Lisa: "PRETESTI ECFRASTICI", University of Florence, Department of Italian Studies, 2004, pp. 34, 196.197, 198 – Soc Ed Fiorentina ISBN 88-87048-93-2

- Antonio Papasso, Nouvelles de l'estampe – Edizioni 193–198 – Page 81, Bibliothèque nationale de France.
- Cinzia Di Bari (BNF): curator of exhibitions and monograph "IL TUTTO E IL NIENTE" of Claudio di Scalzo 2005/6: Sapienza University of Rome, Rome
- Italian Air Force Museum di Vigna di Valle, (Rome) Barletta Riccardo, 2006 a film auteur and monograph "IN PRAISE OF LIGHT" for his retrospective at the Italian Air Force Museum, Vigna di Valle (Rome).

== Images ==
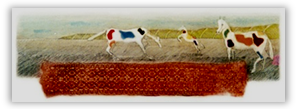
Painting esperimentation early years 1970.

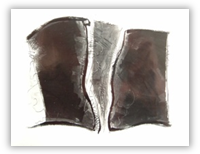
Action painting in early years 1970.

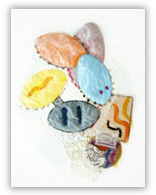
PAPIERS froissés

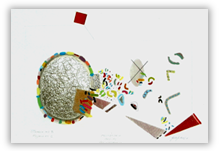
Graphic work 1975 to 2013

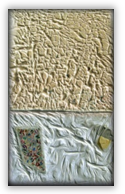
PAPIERS' froissés by Antonio Papasso (early 70s)

== Books ==
- (in Italian) Per essere nuova creatura (PDF) (Italien)
- Works about Papasso
