= Fiat AS.5 =

1920s Italian piston aircraft engine

AS.5
- Type: Piston V-12 aero engine
- Manufacturer: Fiat
- First run: c. 1929
- Major applications: Fiat C.29
- Developed into: Fiat AS.6

The Fiat AS.5 was an Italian liquid-cooled V12 engine designed and built in the late-1920s by Fiat especially for the 1929 Schneider Trophy air race.

== Design and development ==
For the 1929 Schneider Trophy contest Fiat planned a new seaplane to counter the British challengers from Gloster and Supermarine. To minimise frontal area they chose a compact V-12 engine design that set new size standards for a 1,000-horsepower (750 kW) class engine. This unsupercharged engine had a high power-to-weight ratio due to the use of a high compression ratio and a special fuel blend containing a 50/50 mix of petrol and benzole.

A problem encountered with the AS.5 was that it developed maximum power at high crankshaft speeds (3,000 rpm) but lacked output gearing, so that great care had to be taken with the choice of propellers. The production version did feature a reduction gear. The AS.5 was developed into the AS.6, essentially a tandem-coupled combination of two AS.5 units.

== Applications ==
- Fiat C.29

== Specifications (AS.5) ==
Data from Gunston

=== General characteristics ===
- Type: 12-cylinder V-engine
- Bore: 138 mm (5.4 in)
- Stroke: 140 mm (5.5 in)
- Displacement: 25.13 L (1534 cu in)
- Dry weight: 348 kg (767 lb)

=== Components ===
- Valvetrain: Two intake and two exhaust valves per cylinder
- Fuel system: Carburettor
- Cooling system: Liquid-cooled

=== Performance ===
- Power output: 1,000 hp (750 kW) at 3,200 rpm
- Compression ratio: 8:1
- Power-to-weight ratio: 2.15 kW/kg (1.3 hp/lb)

== See also ==
Related development

- Fiat AS.6

Comparable engines

- Curtiss D-12
- Fairey Prince (V-12)
- Packard 1A-1500
- Rolls-Royce Kestrel

Related lists

- List of aircraft engines
