= Sergey Danilin (aviator) =

Navigator for the Moscow-North Pole-San Jacinto flight

- Сергей Алексеевич Данилин
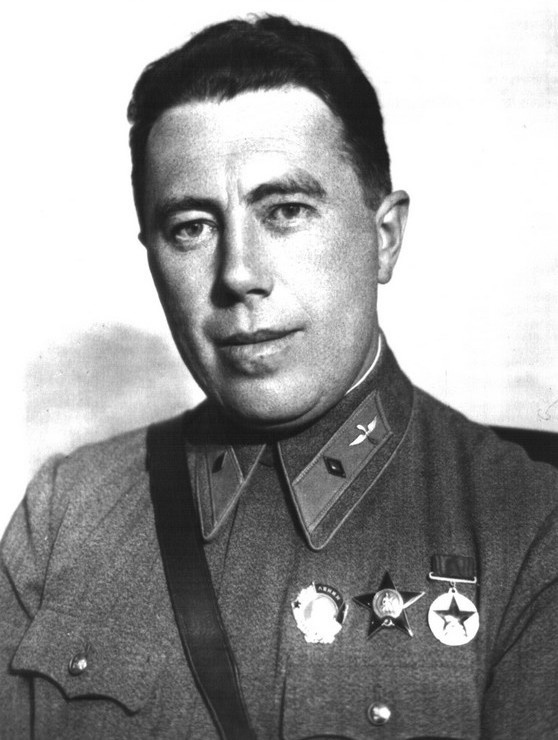
- Born: 21 October [O.S. 8 October] 1901; Moscow, Russian Empire
- Died: 28 December 1978 (aged 77); Moscow, USSR
- Military career
- Allegiance: Soviet Union
- Branch: Soviet Air Force
- Service years: 1919—1960
- Rank: General-lieutenant
- Conflicts: World War II; Winter War; Eastern Front
- Awards: Hero of the Soviet Union

Sergey Alekseevich Danilin (Russian: Сергей Алексеевич Данилин; 21 October [O.S. 8 October] 1901 — 28 December 1978) was the navigator of the historic Moscow-North Pole-San Jacinto flight, for which he was awarded the title Hero of the Soviet Union.

== Early life and education ==
Danilin was born on 21 October [O.S. 8 October] 1901 to a Russian family in Moscow, and spent his youth in Khimki. After graduating from commercial school he joined the Red Army in 1919, and subsequently attended the Moscow Aerial Photogrammetric School, graduating in 1921. From then to 1924 he studied at Moscow State University in addition to his military service.

== Aviation career ==
Starting in 1922 he began his career at the Scientific Testing Institute of the Air Force, starting off as a timekeeper, then an aerologist, before moving on to being an observer pilot, before finally becoming a test navigator. There, worked in the development of aerial navigation methods. Having headed the aircraft equipment department of the research institute since 1929, he went on to participate in the designing of devices for photo reconnaissance in combat and improving flight methods in intense weather conditions, including "blind" flights. He authored the first Soviet manual for instrument piloting, and in 1935 he wrote a textbook on navigation.

=== Moscow-San Jacinto flight ===
On 12 July 1937 he took off from Moscow in an ANT-25 as navigator under the command of pilot Mikhail Gromov and co-pilot Andrey Yumashev for what became the record-breaking Moscow-San Jacinto flight. Despite encountering a variety of difficulties, such as having to fly blind at various points and having difficulty finding a place to land since the San Diego Airport was experiencing poor weather, they managed to safely land in a pasture near the city of San Jacinto on 14 July. In total, the flight lasted 62 hours and 17 minutes, covering 10,148 kilometers. After landing the crew went on a three-week tour of the United States, being given the status of honorary citizens of the city of Los Angeles by the mayor and meeting with president Franklin Delano Roosevelt in Washington DC.

=== Return to the USSR ===
On 1 September 1937 he as well as Gromov and Yumashev were awarded the title Hero of the Soviet Union. They also received the De la Vaulx Medal from the FAI. He was also elected to the Supreme Soviet of the USSR of the 1st convocation. In 1938 he was appointed head of a special services department group and deputy head of the Air Force Research Institute. During the Winter War, he flew in combat as a navigator on a bomber. During the war, having observed the operation of Redut ground-based radar, he proposed developing airborne radar for detecting and attacking enemy aircraft regardless of visibility conditions. The idea was addressed at a meeting with leading engineers of the Air Force in mid 1940, then in 1941 a laboratory prototype was created, and by December 1942 the Gneiss-2 radar system was used by Soviet aircraft in the battles for Moscow and Stalingrad.

Starting in 1943, Danilin was a member of the Radar Council of the State Defense Committee, which engaged in the development of the radar equipment industry in the USSR. From 1943 to 1944 he served as head of the Scientific Testing Institute of the Air Force Special Services, and from 1944 to 1951 he served as deputy head of the Scientific Testing Institute of the Air Force and headed one of the Scientific Directorates of the Air Force. From 1951 to 1953 he worked as assistant to the Commander-in-Chief of the Air Force Radio Engineering Service, and from 1953 to 1959 he went back to the Scientific Testing Institute of the Air Force to head the institution. He then briefly worked in a science group under the Commander-in-Chief of the Air Force before retiring with the rank of Lieutenant-General in 1960. He lived in Moscow for the remainder of his life, where he died on 28 December 1978 and was buried in the Kuntsevo Cemetery.

== Awards ==
- Hero of the Soviet Union (1 September 1937)
- Two Order of Lenin (1 September 1937, 30 April 1945)
- Two Order of the Red Banner (3 November 1944, 15 November 1950)
- Order of Suvorov 2nd class (18 August 1945)
- Order of the Patriotic War 1st class (1 July 1944)
- Two Order of the Red Star (25 May 1936, 17 June 1943)
- campaign and jubilee medals
