= Mikhail Gromov (aviator) =

Russian-Soviet test pilot, aviator, researcher

- Михаил Громов
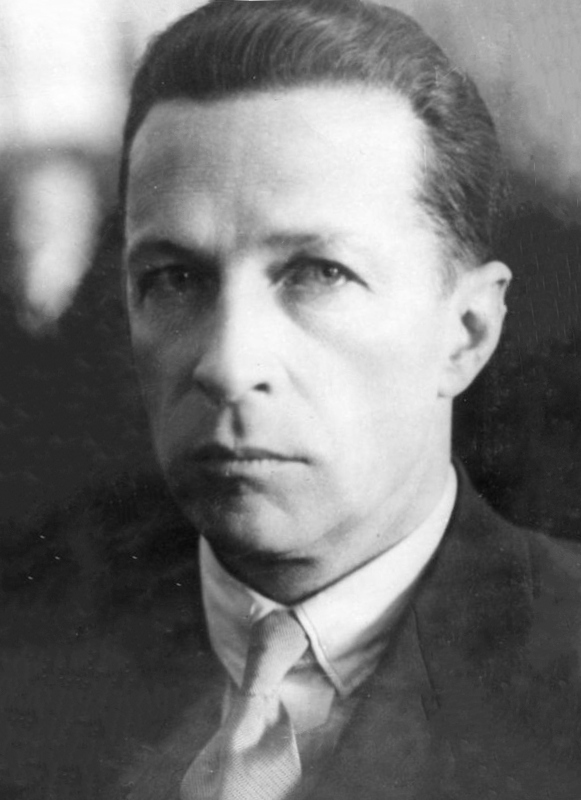
- Gromov in 1937
- Born: 24 February [O.S. 12 February] 1899; Tver, Russian Empire
- Died: 22 January 1985 (aged 85); Moscow, Russian SFSR, Soviet Union
- Resting place: Novodevichy Cemetery, Moscow
- Monuments: Zhukovsky, Russia at the headquarters of the Gromov Flight Research Institute
- Known for: Establishing a new non-stop flight distance record of 12411 kilometers (6,306 mi) from Moscow to San Jacinto, California, U.S
- Awards: Hero of the Soviet Union; National Order of the Legion of Honour
- Aviation career
- First flight: 1917; Farman IV
- Famous flights: Moscow-Beijing-Tokyo; Moscow-Königsberg-Berlin-Paris-Rome; -Vienna-Prague-Warsaw-Moscow: Moscow-San Jacinto
- Flight license: 1918; Moscow
- Air force: Imperial Russian Army→ Soviet Air Forces
- Rank: General-Polkovnik of aviation (1944)

Mikhail Mikhailovich Gromov (Russian: Михаи́л Миха́йлович Гро́мов; 24 February [O.S. 12 February] 1899 – 22 January 1985) was a Soviet military aviator, test pilot, and Hero of the Soviet Union.

== Early life ==
Gromov's father, Mikhail Konstantinovich Gromov, was of noble intelligentsia and served as military medic. His mother, Lyubov Ignatyevna Andreeva, was from peasant family and received training as an obstetrician. Gromov spent his childhood in Kaluga, Rzhev, Myza-Raevo (near Moscow). He graduated from Voskresensky Real School in Moscow, and went on to study at the IMTS from 1916 to 1917. In 1917, Gromov graduated from aviation theoretical courses at IMTS and started his army service.

== Career ==
=== Institutional positions ===
Upon graduation, Gromov served as a flight instructor and military pilot. In 1923, he won the Soviet championship in weightlifting. In 1925, he started working as a test pilot for the Air Force Research Institute testing the planes designed by Andrei Tupolev and Nikolai Polikarpov. From 1930 to 1941, Gromov then worked at the Central Aerohydrodynamic Institute and became chief-pilot.

From March to August 1941, Gromov was the first director of the Flight Research Institute, a flight research and testing centre in Zhukovsky. The name of M. M. Gromov was awarded to the institute in 1991 to celebrate the Institute's 50th anniversary.

After the war, Gromov was deputy commander of the Long-Range Aviation from 1946 to 1949. Later, till 1955, he was head of Department of flight service of Ministry of Aviation Industry. In 1955 he was discharged.

From 1937 to 1946, Gromov was deputy of the Supreme Soviet of the USSR (1st convocation).

In late 1940, he initiated the establishment of the Fedotov Test Pilot School.

=== Testing history ===
Gromov was involved in extensive testing and promotion of Russian airplanes throughout Europe and Asia. For example, from June to September 1925, Gromov flew the Polikarpov R-1 in the long-haul group flight of nine aeroplanes on the route Moscow-Beijing-Tokyo. A year later, in 1926, Gromov completed a 7,150 kilometers (4,440 mi) European promotional flight in a Tupolev ANT-3 on the route Moscow-Königsberg-Berlin-Paris-Rome-Vienna-Prague-Warsaw-Moscow. Notably, on 25 April 1927, he made the first Soviet parachute jump out of a Polikarpov I-1 in a testing that involved the plane having entered into an unrecoverable spin.

From 10 to 12 September 1934, Gromov, A. I. Filin, and I. T. Spirin made a record closed-circle non-stop flight on the route Moscow-Ryazan-Kharkov in a Tupolev ANT-25, flying 12,411 kilometers (7,712 mi) in 75 hours. Gromov was subsequently awarded the title of Hero of the Soviet Union for this feat.

In July 1937, Gromov, Andrey Yumashev, and Sergey Danilin established a new non-stop flight distance record of 10,148 kilometers (6,306 mi) from Moscow to San Jacinto, California, via the North Pole in a Tupolev ANT-25.

=== Service in World War II ===
During World War II, Gromov took command of several units:

- From December 1941 to February 1942, Gromov was commander of 31st Mixed Aviation Division (Kalinin Front).
- From February to May 1942, he was commander of the Air Force of Kalinin Front.
- From May 1942 to May 1943, he took command of the 3rd Air Army.
- From May 1943 to June 1944, he was commander of the 1st Air Army.
- From 1944 to 1946, Gromov was head of the Main Department of combat training of frontline aviation of the Air Force.

== Miscellaneous ==
From 1959 to 1961, Gromov headed the Weightlifting Federation of USSR.

Gromov used his influence and renown to attain reconsideration of Sergei Korolev's case, which resulted in Korolev's transfer from the prison camp at Kolyma to TsKB-29.

Gromov lived in Moscow. Gromov's wife, Nina Georgievna Gromova (1922–2019), was an equestrian sportswoman.

Gromov died on 22 January 1985 in Moscow. He is buried at Novodevichy Cemetery.

== Commemorations ==
=== Monuments ===
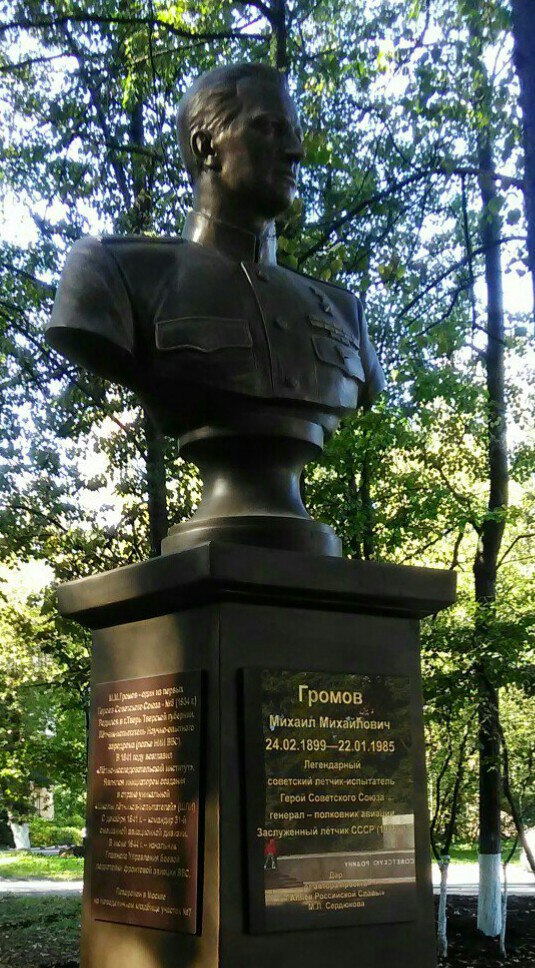
Monument in Shchyolkovo near Chkalovsky, Russia

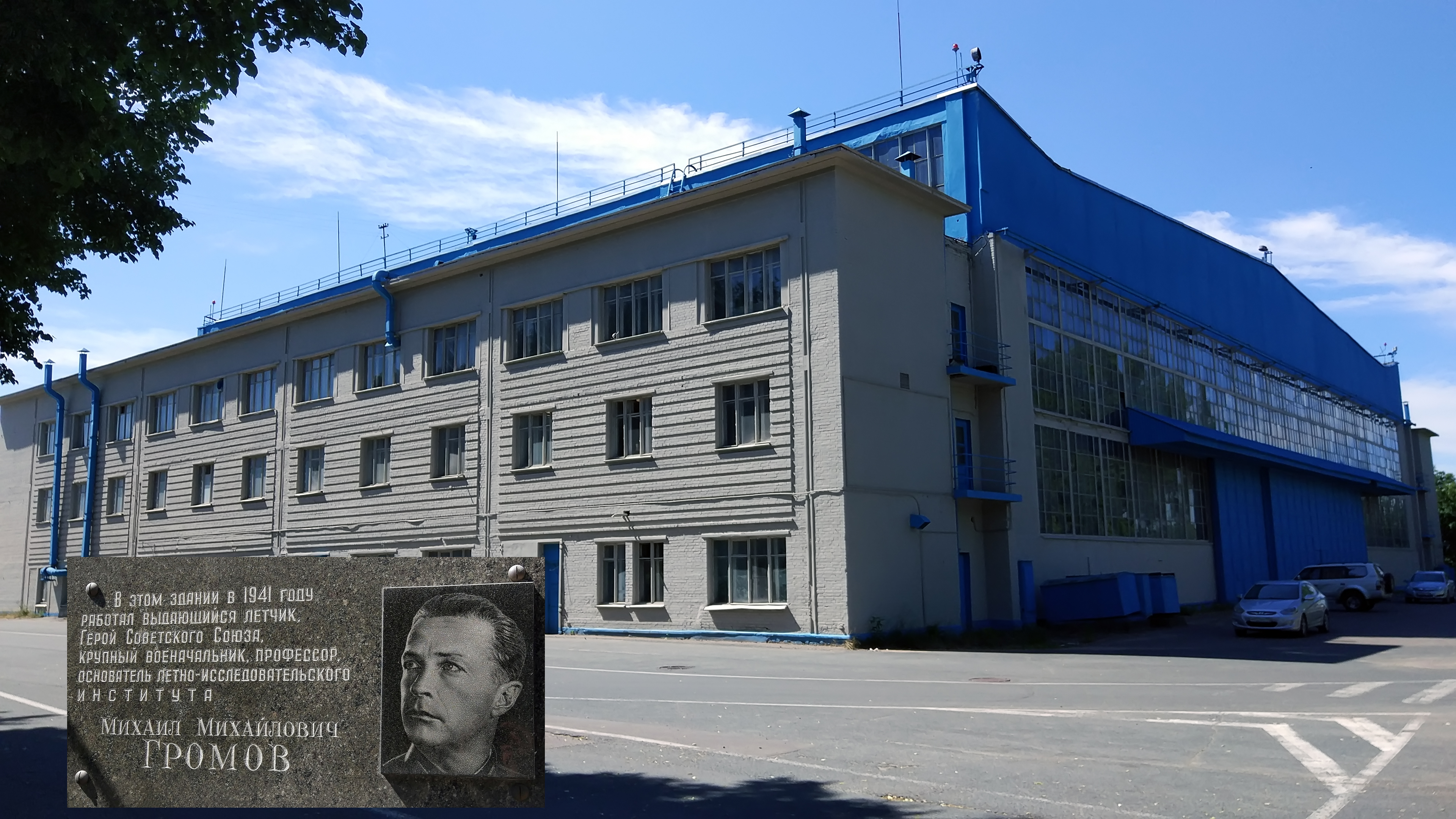
Mikhail Gromov commemorative plaque on the Gromov Flight Research Institute hangar 1

=== In philately ===
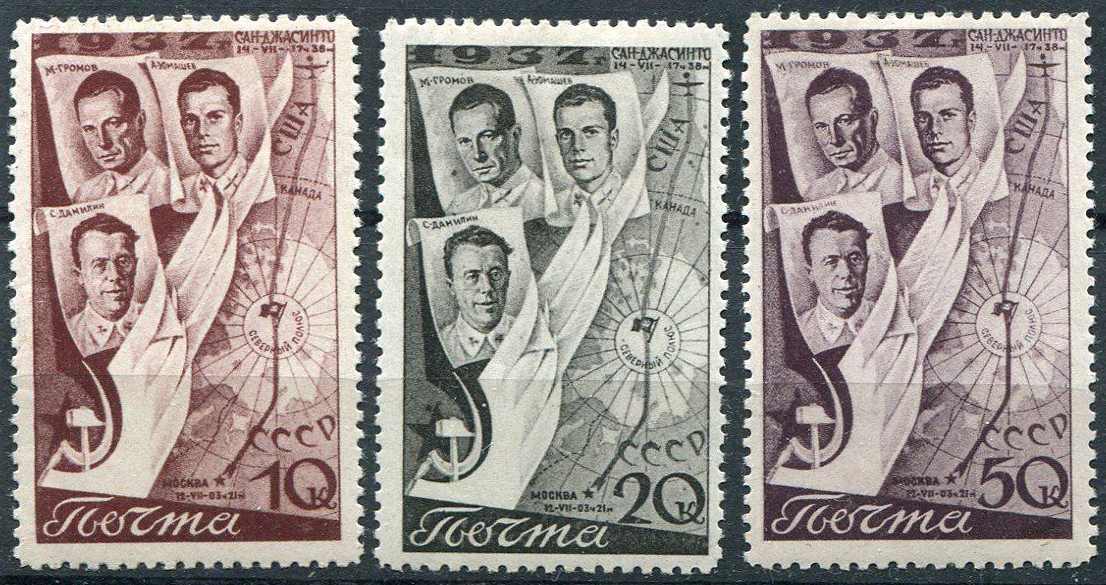
Danilin, Gromov and Yumashev on the USSR postage stamps (1937)

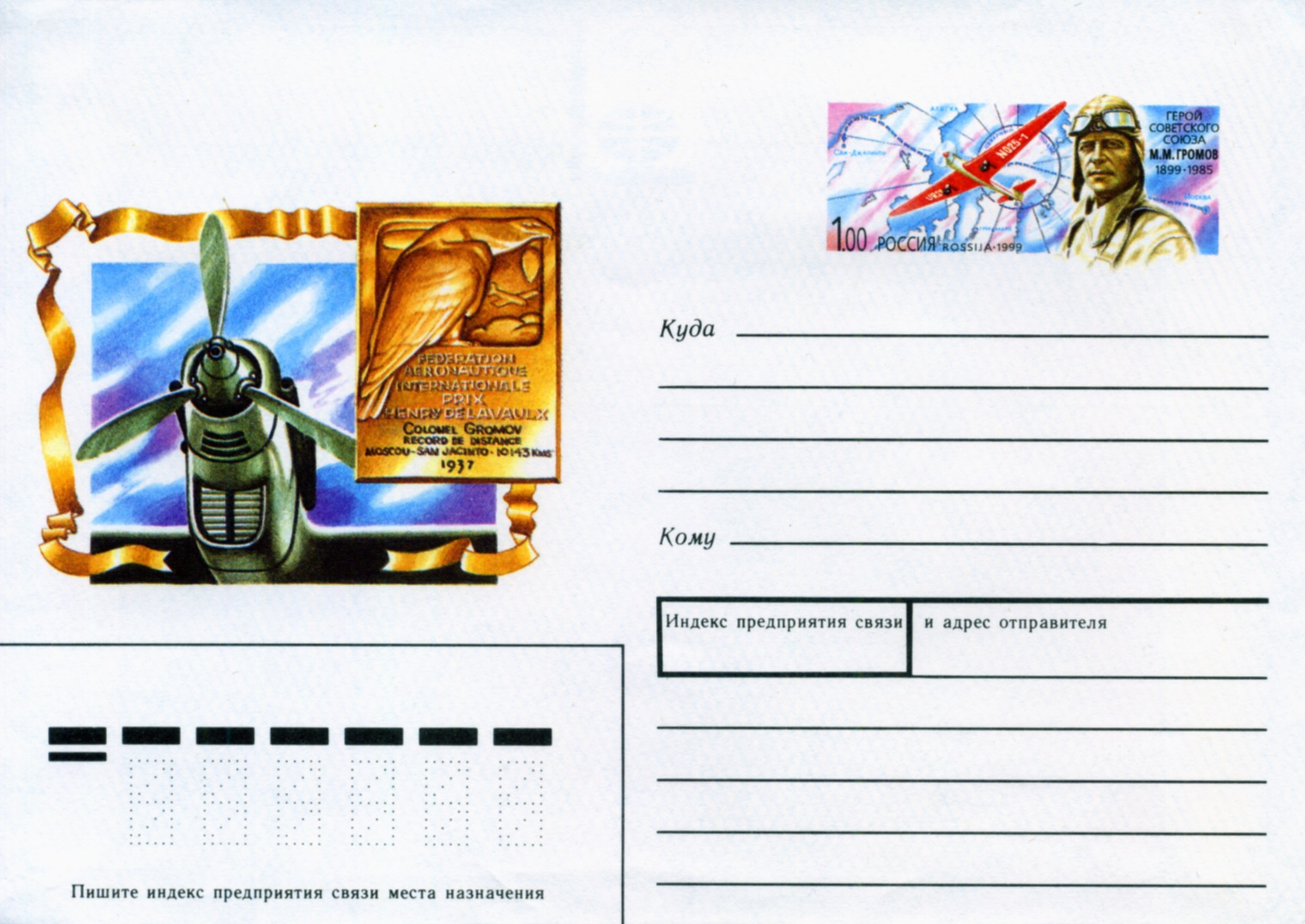
Russian post envelope with commemorative stamp on M. M. Gromov 100-years anniversary (1999)

=== In phaleristics ===
The Gromov Medal was established in March 2011 by the Gromov Flight Research Institute as a highest corporate award in memory of the founder of the institute.

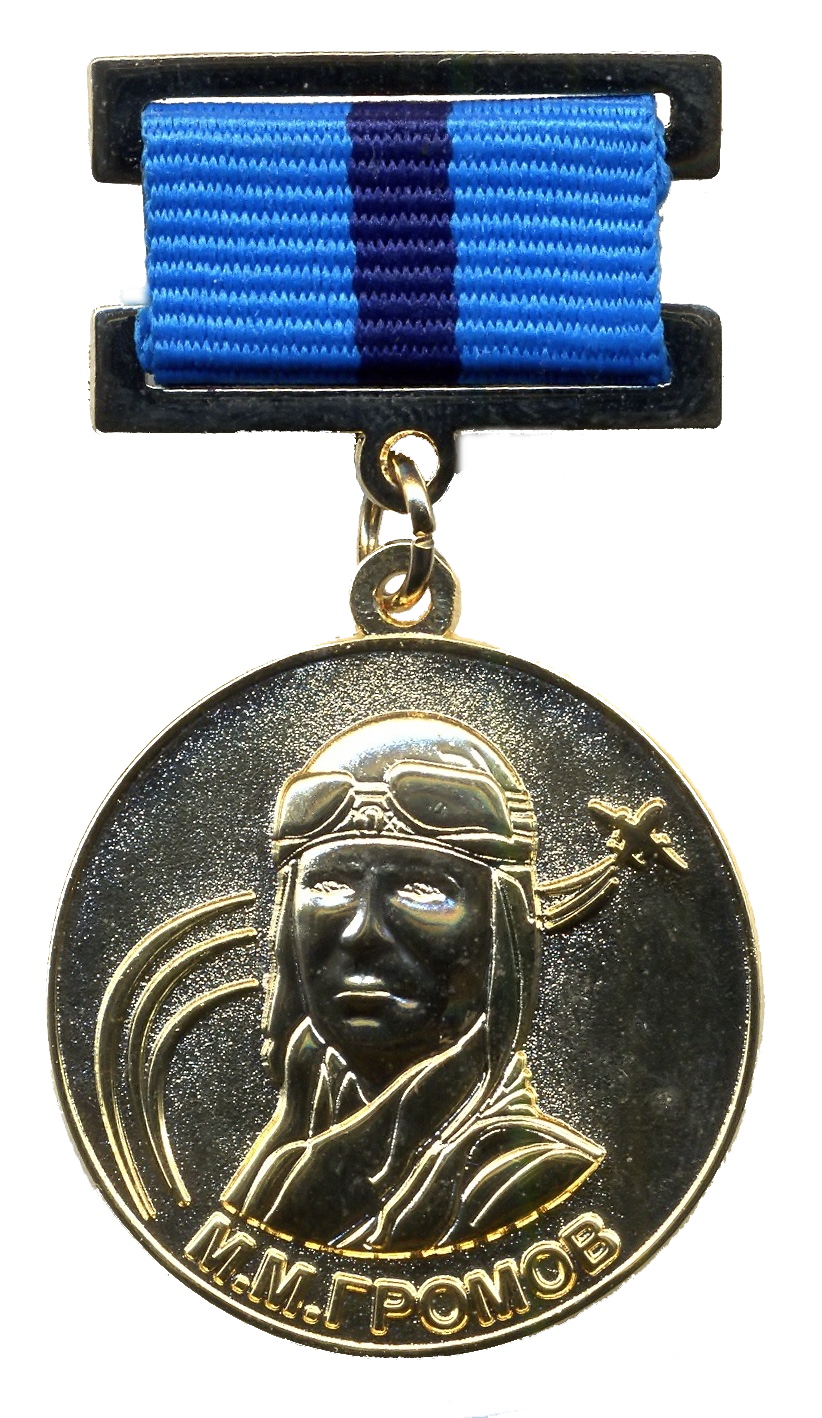
Obverse

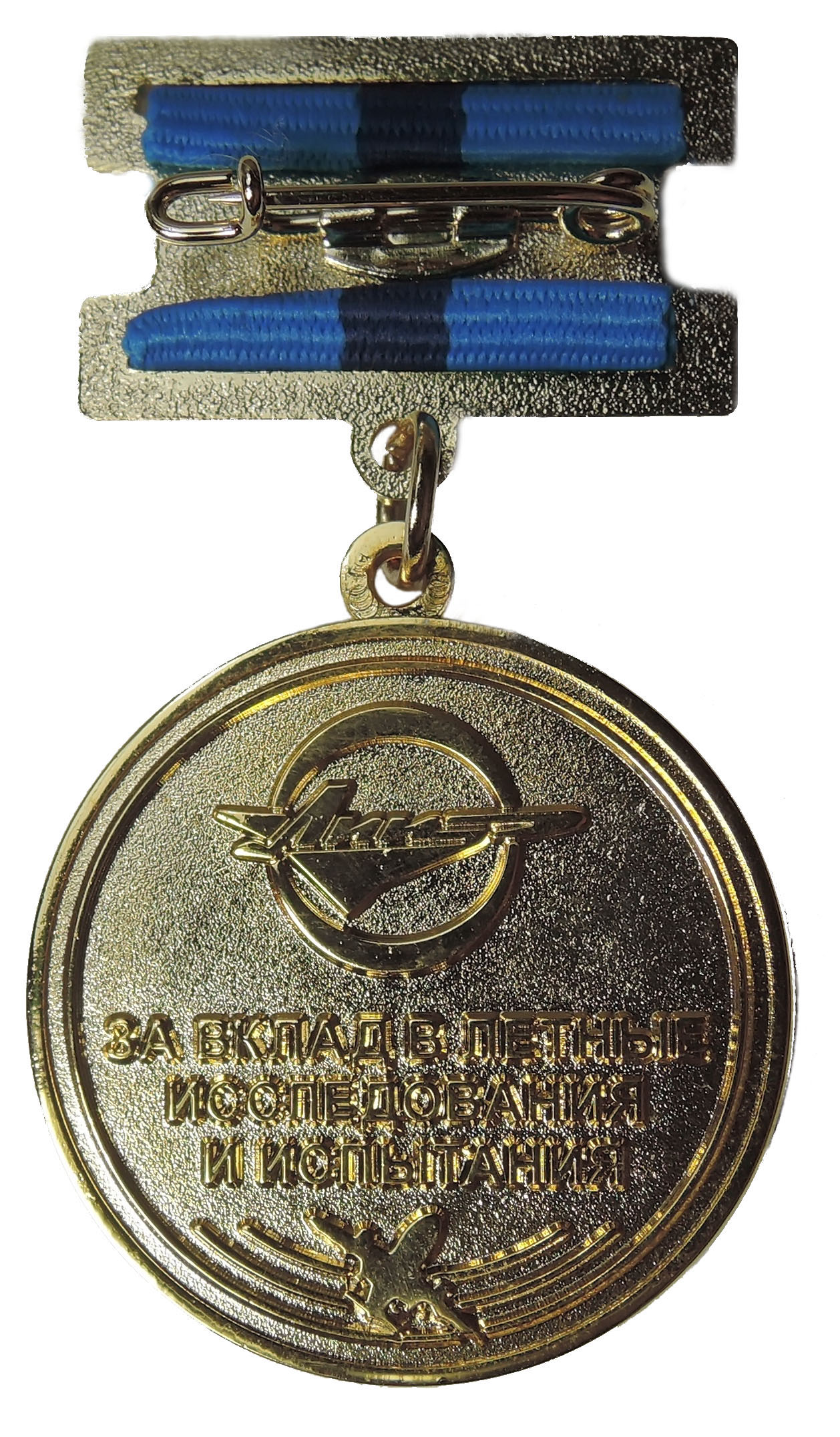
Reverse
