= Fiat AS.8 =

1940s Italian piston aircraft engine

AS.8
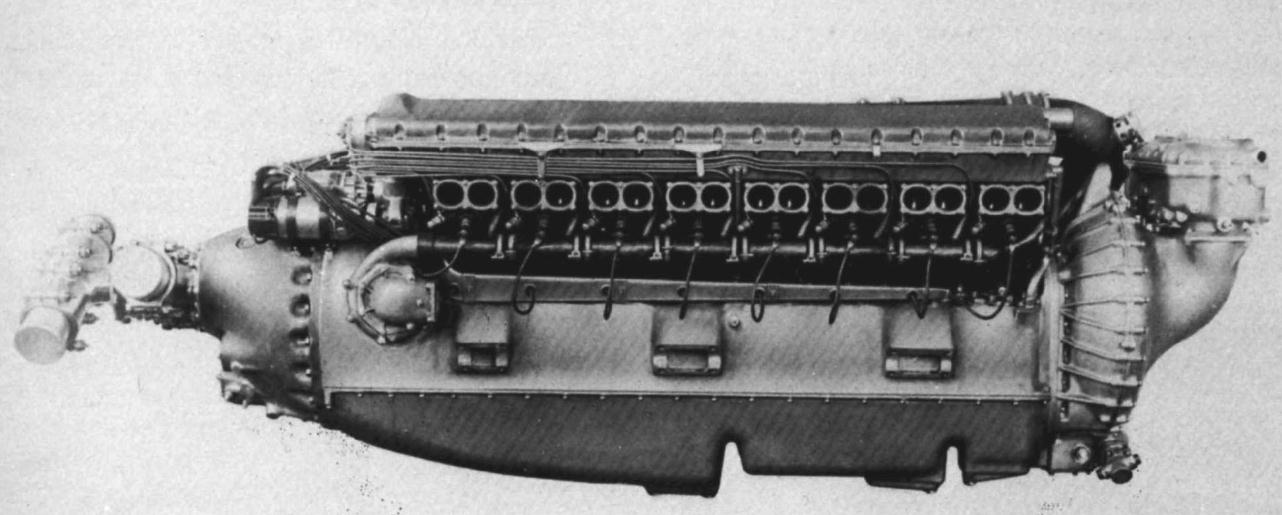
- Type: Piston V16 aero engine
- Manufacturer: Fiat Aviazione
- First run: c. 1940
- Developed from: Fiat AS.6

The Fiat AS.8 was a large Italian V16, liquid-cooled aircraft racing engine designed and built in the late-1930s by Fiat for an attempt to capture the air speed record. Another reason for the design was to provide the Regia Aeronautica with high performance fighter aircraft engines.

Production problems caused the project to be abandoned when Italy entered World War II in June 1940, power for the fighter designs moved to licensed-built Daimler-Benz DB 605 V12 engines as the Fiat RA.1050.

== Design and development ==
This V16 engine used a supercharger similar to that used on the Fiat AS.6 capable of delivering air at a boost pressure of 1,350 mmHg (53.15 inHg). The unusually long crankshaft was supported by nine main bearings to prevent torsional vibration. A propeller speed reduction unit was used to drive contra-rotating propellers.

During dynamometer testing in the early 1940s the engine produced 1,680 kW (2,250 hp) and ran reliably for over 100 hours, where the AS.6 had been limited to one hour running.

Work on the speed record aircraft, the Fiat C.S.15, progressed slowly but by June 1940 a static test airframe was ready for wind tunnel analysis, it was predicted to have a top speed of 850 km/h (530 mph). The aircraft suffered damage from air raids and the factory was taken over in 1943 during the German occupation of Italy.

== Applications ==
- Fiat C.S.15 (intended)

== Specifications ==
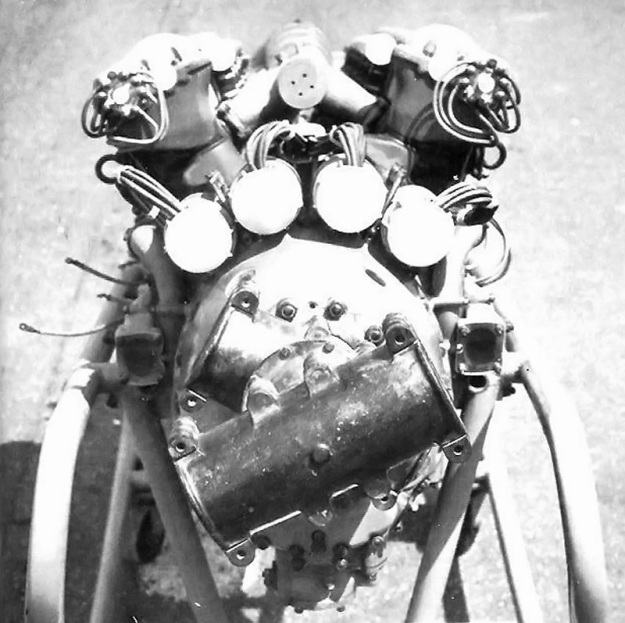
Front view showing the ignition system distributors and propeller hubs

Data from Montalbano.

=== General characteristics ===
- Type: 45° V16
- Bore: 140 mm (5.51 in)
- Stroke: 140 mm (5.51 in)
- Displacement: 34.482 L (2,104.2 cu in)
- Dry weight: 715 kg (1,576 lb), 790 kg (1,740 lb) with coolant/oil

=== Components ===
- Valvetrain: Double overhead camshaft (DOHC), two intake and two exhaust valves per cylinder
- Supercharger: Single-stage, centrifugal
- Fuel system: Carburettor
- Cooling system: Liquid-cooled

=== Performance ===
- Power output: 1,680 kW (2,250 hp) at 3,200 rpm
- Compression ratio: 6.5:1

== See also ==
Related development

- Fiat AS.6

Comparable engines

- Rolls-Royce R

Related lists

- List of aircraft engines
