= Transpolar flight of Gromov, Yumashev and Danilin =

1937 Soviet transpolar record flight

Soviet poster, 1937

The transpolar flight of Gromov, Yumashev and Danilin was a nonstop flight from Moscow to San Jacinto, California, via the North Pole, carried out on 12–14 July 1937 by a Soviet crew flying a Tupolev ANT-25. The crew consisted of commander Mikhail Gromov, co-pilot Andrey Yumashev, and navigator Sergey Danilin. The flight established a world record for nonstop straight-line flight distance of 10,148.5 km (6,306.0 mi).

== History ==
It was the second nonstop flight from the Soviet Union to the United States over the North Pole, following the flight of Valery Chkalov, Georgy Baydukov, and Alexander Belyakov the previous month.

Preparations for Gromov's flight incorporated experience gained from Chkalov's crossing. Belyakov later wrote that Chkalov's crew had encountered an oxygen shortage while flying at high altitude over Canada, and that Gromov's ANT-25 was consequently equipped with a larger supply of liquid oxygen, allowing the crew to remain at high altitude for longer.

Gromov later wrote that his crew carried about 500 kg more fuel than Chkalov's aircraft and removed approximately 250 kg of equipment and supplies in order to increase its range.

The crew flew from Moscow across the North Pole to southern California, setting a world record for nonstop flight distance. The recognized straight-line distance was 10,148.5 km (6,306.0 mi). According to the Soviet government commission, the aircraft covered approximately 11,500 km (7,100 mi) along its actual route, of which more than 5,500 km (3,400 mi) was over oceans, seas and ice. The flight lasted 62 hours and 17 minutes.

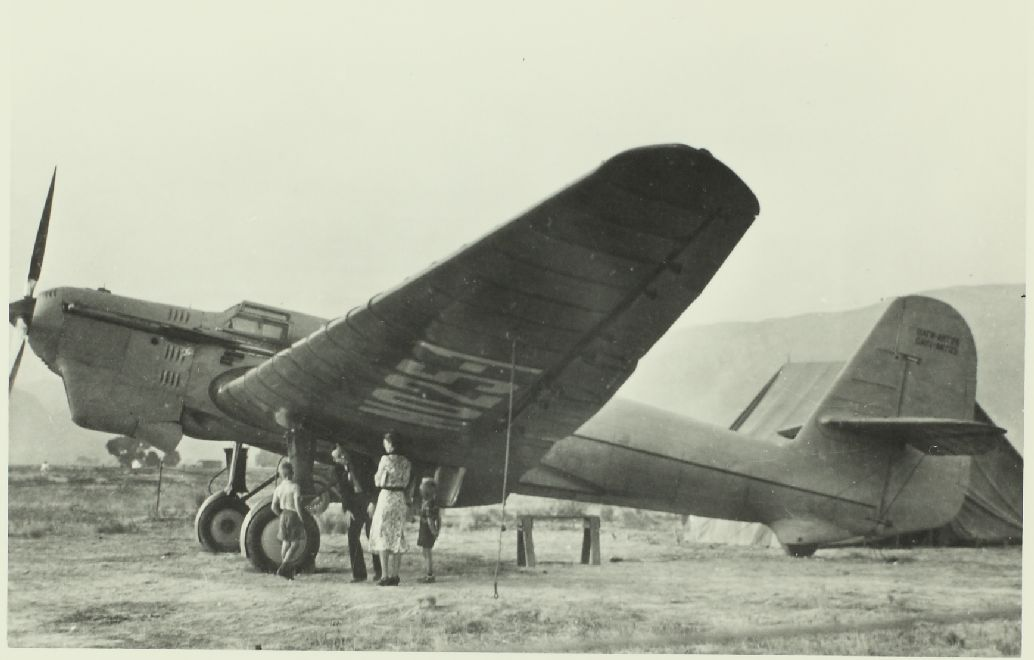
Gromov's ANT-25 at San Jacinto

The crew had intended to continue to San Diego, but fog prevented them from landing there. They instead found a suitable pasture near San Jacinto and landed the ANT-25 there on 14 July.

Following the landing, the crew received a congratulatory telegram from Joseph Stalin, Vyacheslav Molotov, Kliment Voroshilov and other members of the Soviet leadership, praising the completion of the flight and the establishment of a new world straight-line distance record.

During their subsequent tour of the United States, the aviators visited Washington, D.C., where they met President Franklin D. Roosevelt at the White House.

On 5 August, the aviators departed New York for Europe aboard the ocean liner SS Normandie. They returned to Moscow on 23 August and received a ceremonial welcome. A reception was subsequently held for the crew in the St George Hall of the Grand Kremlin Palace, attended by members of the Soviet leadership including Joseph Stalin.

== Awards ==
For the flight, by decree of the Central Executive Committee of the Soviet Union dated 1 September 1937, Mikhail Gromov was awarded the Order of the Red Banner, while Andrey Yumashev and Sergey Danilin were awarded the title Hero of the Soviet Union.

The Fédération Aéronautique Internationale (FAI) homologated the distance record. After objections to the record were investigated by the Royal Aero Club, its committee concluded that the Soviet crew had fulfilled the requirements of the FAI sporting code, and the FAI retained the record. Gromov, Yumashev and Danilin were awarded the De la Vaulx Medal for the achievement.

== Commemoration ==
The flight was commemorated by a series of three Soviet postage stamps issued in 1938, depicting Gromov, Yumashev and Danilin and the route of the flight.

The landing area near San Jacinto was registered as California Historical Landmark No. 989 on 20 October 1989.
