= Macchi M.C.72 =

Italian experimental seaplane

M.C.72
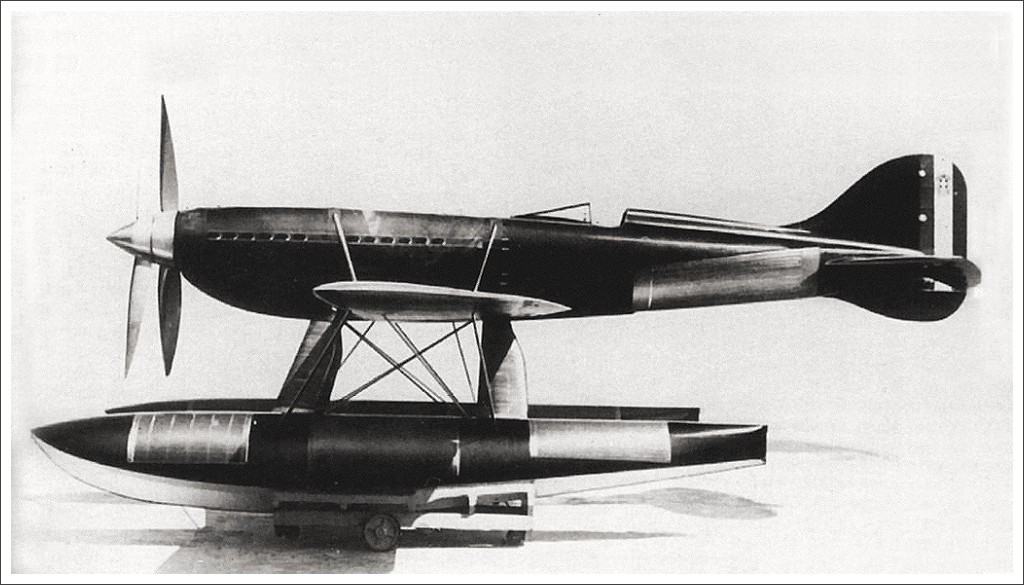

General information
- Type: Seaplane racing aircraft
- Manufacturer: Aeronautica Macchi
- Designer: Mario Castoldi
- Primary user: Kingdom of Italy
- Number built: 5

History
- First flight: July 1931
- Retired: 23 October 1934 (last flight)

The Macchi M.C. 72 is an experimental floatplane designed and built by the Italian aircraft company Macchi Aeronautica. The M.C. 72 held the world speed record for all aircraft for five years. In 1933 and 1934 it set world speed records for piston engine-powered seaplanes; the latter still stands.

== Design and development ==
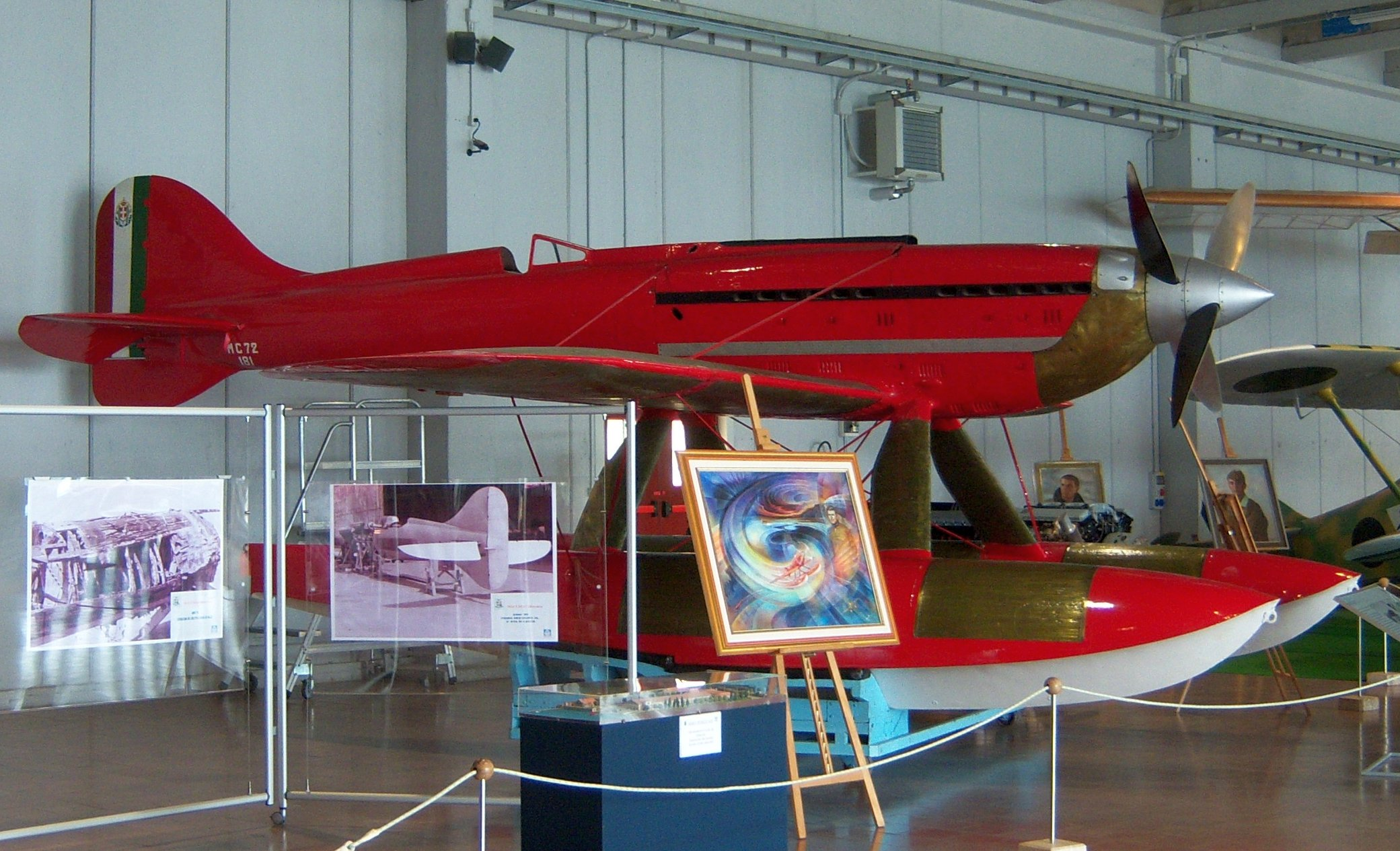
Preserved Macchi M.C.72 in Italy at the Museo storico dell'Aeronautica Militare di Vigna di Valle

The Macchi M.C. 72 was one of a series of seaplanes developed by Macchi Aeronautica. In the 1920s, Macchi focused on speed and on winning the Schneider Trophy. In 1922 the company hired aircraft designer Mario Castoldi to design high-speed aircraft.

In 1926 the company won the trophy with the M.39, which attained a top speed of 396 km/h (246 mph). Further aircraft, the M.52, M.52R and the M.67, were designed and built but victory in the Schneider races kept eluding the Italians. Castoldi then designed the M.C. 72, a single-seater aircraft with two floats powered by a modified FIAT AS.6 supercharged V24 engine, generating around 1,900-2,300 kW (2,500-3,100 hp), driving contra-rotating propellers.

The forward part of the M.C. 72's fuselage is constructed of metal; aft of the cockpit it is of wood, with a wood skin over a structure of bulkheads and longerons attached to the front section with four bolts. The nose enclosed an oil tank with its outside wall exposed to the airstream. The wing was all metal, with flat tubular water radiators faired into the wings. The twin floats had three radiators on the outer surfaces, the forward radiator for water and the centre and rear radiators for oil cooling. The float struts also had water radiators and another radiator was fitted during hot conditions under the fuselage running from cockpit to tail.

The M.C. 72 was built in 1931 for what turned out to be the final Schneider Trophy race, but due to engine problems was unable to compete.

Instead of halting development, Macchi continued work on the M.C. 72. Benito Mussolini personally took an interest in seeing development of the M.C. 72 continue and directed state funds to the company.

== Operational history ==
For two years, the M.C. 72 suffered from many mechanical defects, as well as the loss of two test pilots who died trying to coax world class speed out of the M.C. 72 (first Giovanni Monti and then Stanislao Bellini).

After 35 flights the engines were overhauled in preparation for a record attempt. Rod Banks, a British engineer who worked on the Supermarine seaplane racers, developed special high octane fuel. With this fuel, the aircraft finally lived up to expectations when it set a new world speed record (over water) on 10 April 1933, with a speed of 682 km/h (424 mph). It was piloted by Warrant Officer Francesco Agello (the last qualified test pilot). Not satisfied, development continued as the aircraft's designers thought they could surpass 700 km/h (430 mph) with the M.C. 72. This was achieved on 23 October 1934, when Agello piloted the M.C. 72 at an average speed of 709.207 km/h (440.681 mph) over three passes. This record remains (as of 2026) the highest speed ever attained by a piston-engined seaplane. After this success the M.C.72 was never flown again.

=== Speed record ===
The M.C. 72 held the world speed record for all aircraft for five years. For comparison, the record holder for a land-based aircraft was held (for a time) by the Hughes H-1 Racer with a top speed of only 566 km/h (352 mph). Then, in 1939, two German racing aircraft surpassed the M.C. 72. The first was a Heinkel prototype fighter which reached the speed of 746 km/h (464 mph). The second was the Messerschmitt Me 209, built by Messerschmitt solely for the purpose of setting a new world speed record, which it achieved with a speed of 756 km/h (470 mph) on April 26 – less than 5 months before the start of World War II. The current world speed record for a piston-engined aircraft is 531.53 mph (855.41 km/h) set by a modified P-51 Mustang named Voodoo over three km in 2017. However, the M.C. 72 record still stands as the world's fastest propeller-driven seaplane.

== Surviving aircraft ==
One M.C. 72, the aircraft that took the world record, survives. It is on display at the Italian Air Force Museum, near Rome.

== Specifications ==
Macchi-Castoldi M.C.72

Data from Flying-boats and Seaplanes since 1910.

General characteristics

- Crew: 1
- Length: 8.32 m (27 ft 4 in)
- Wingspan: 9.48 m (31 ft 1 in)
- Width: 3.3 m (10 ft 10 in)
- Wing area: 15 m^{2} (160 sq ft)
- Airfoil: Biconvex
- Empty weight: 2,505 kg (5,523 lb)
- Gross weight: 2,907 kg (6,409 lb)
- Max takeoff weight: 3,031 kg (6,682 lb)
- Powerplant: 1 × Fiat AS.6 24-cylinder coupled V-12 liquid-cooled piston engine, 2,126 kW (2,851 hp)
- Propellers: 4-bladed contra-rotating fixed-pitch propeller

Performance

- Maximum speed: 709.209 km/h (440.682 mph, 382.942 kn) (world speed record)

== See also ==
Aircraft of comparable role, configuration, and era

- Supermarine S.6B

Related lists

- List of seaplanes and flying boats
- List of Schneider Trophy aircraft
