= Francesco Agello =

Italian test pilot

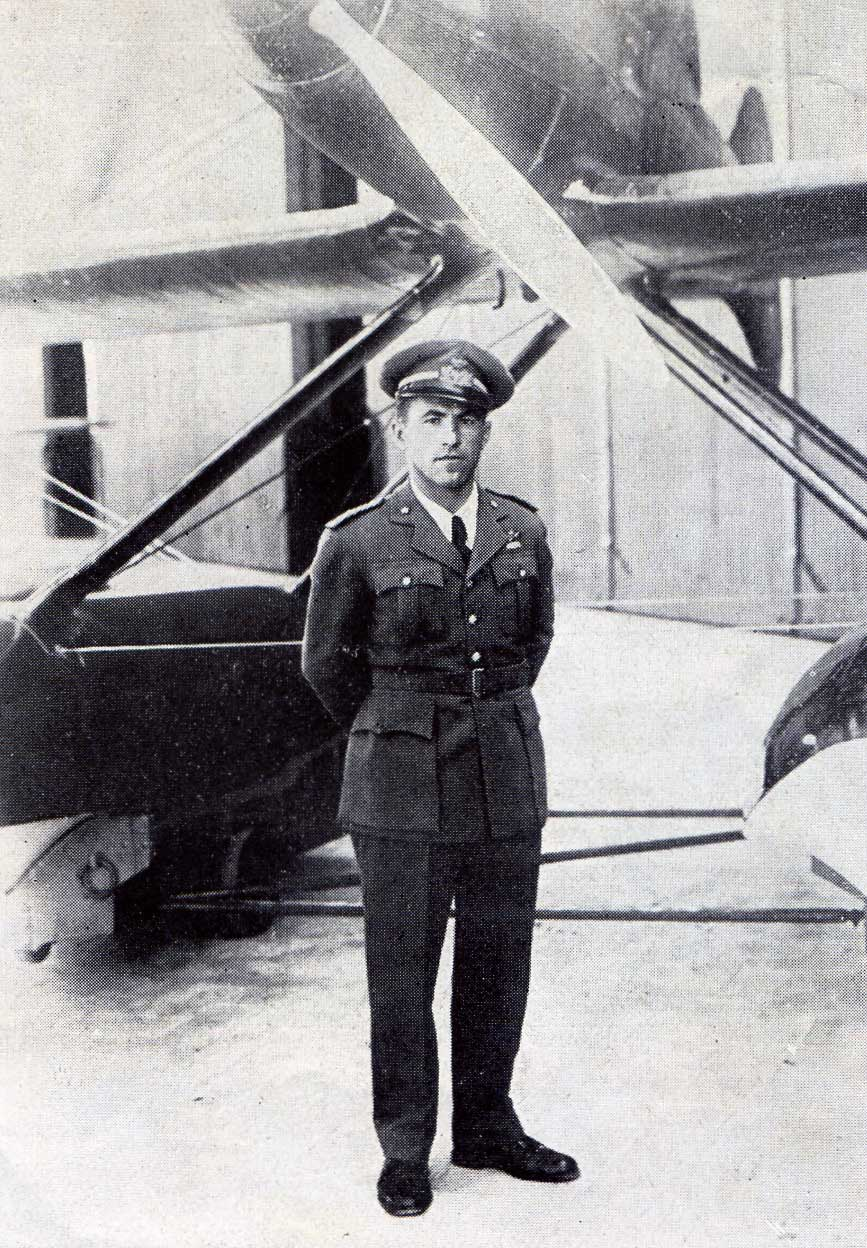
- Francesco Agello poses with his Macchi M.C.72
- Born: 27 December 1902; Casalpusterlengo, Lombardy, Kingdom of Italy
- Died: 24 November 1942 (aged 39); Milan, Kingdom of Italy
- Military career
- Allegiance: Italy
- Awards: De la Vaulx Medal (twice); Gold Medal of Aeronautic Valor

Francesco Agello (27 December 1902 – 24 November 1942) was an Italian test pilot.

== Biography and flight achievements ==
Born at Casalpusterlengo, Lombardy, Italy, Agello graduated from pilot school in 1924 and soon became a test pilot. He was the fourth of four test pilots who tried to set a speed record with the Macchi M.C.72. However, one after the other, the test pilots ahead of Agello died (first Monti and then Bellini flying the M.C. 72, Neri died flying a CR-20 in 1933). Agello became famous when he succeeded in piloting the plane to a new speed record (over water) on 10 April 1933. He attained an average speed of 683 km/h (424 mph). More than a year later he flew the M.C. 72 to a new speed record of more than 700 km/h (709 km/h or 440 mph) on 23 October 1934. Both records, while obtained in a seaplane, also were absolute flight airspeed record. No one has ever flown a piston-engine seaplane faster since that date.

== Awards ==
Agello was awarded the De la Vaulx Medal twice for his speed records, once in 1933 and again in 1934. In 1934 he was also awarded the Medal of Aeronautic Valor.

== Later career ==
In 1935 Agello joined the Italian government's airplane test center.

== Death ==
Agello died during World War II testing the new Macchi C.202 fighter at Bresso, near Milan, when his aircraft collided with another C.202 piloted by World War I flying ace and fellow test pilot Guido Masiero in heavy fog on 24 November 1942. Masiero also was killed.

== Sources ==
- De la Vaulx Medal
