= List of flight distance records =

This list of flight distance records contains only those set without any mid-air refueling.

== Non-commercial powered aircraft ==
Sortable table
Year	Date	Distance	Pilot	Aircraft	Notes
2006	February 8–12, 2006	41,467.46 km	Steve Fossett	GlobalFlyer	Single pilot (Steve Fossett) flight.
1986	December 14–23, 1986	40,212.14 km	Richard Glenn Rutan and Jeana Yeager	Rutan Voyager	Circumnavigation. Fédération Aéronautique Internationale record holder up to 2006 (current class holder).
1962	January 10–11, 1962	20,168.78 km (12532.3 mi)	Major Clyde P. Evely and crew	Boeing B-52H Stratofortress	From Kadena AB, Okinawa, to Torrejon AB, Spain, via Tokyo, Seattle, Fort Worth, Washington and the Azores
1946	September 29 – October 2, 1946	18,083.6 km	CDR Tom Davies pilot, Cdr. Eugene Rankin (co-pilot) and two crew	P2V-1 Neptune	From Perth, Australia to Columbus, Ohio, US
1944	July 2, 1944	16,435 km	Imperial Japanese Army Air Service (Omata, Tanaka, Shimazaki, Sakamoto, Motimatsu, Habiro)	Tachikawa Ki-77	From Xinjing to Baicheng, China (closed circuit)
1939	August 1, 1939	12,936 km (8,038 mi)	Regia Aeronautica: Angelo Tondi, Riccardo Dogasso, Ferruccio Vignoni, Aldo Staiano	Savoia-Marchetti SM.82	Closed-circuit world record
1945	November 20, 1945	12,739.6 km	U.S. Army Air Forces; C. S. Irvine + crew of 9	Boeing B-29 Superfortress	From Guam to Washington
1938	November 5–7, 1938	11,526 km (7,162 mi)	Royal Air Force Long Range Development Unit; R. Kellett, H.A.V. Hogan and A. N. Combe (first pilots) + crew of two (also qualified pilots) in each aircraft	Vickers Wellesley	From Ismailia, Egypt, to Darwin, Northern Territory, in Australia; three aircraft flew in formation, Hogan landed to refuel at Koepang (500 miles short of Darwin, Australia), the other two landed at Darwin, Northern Territory.
1938	May 13–15, 1938	11,651.011 km	Yuzoh Fujita + crew (Japan)	Koken-ki	Three-corner course over Japan. Closed-circuit record.
1937	July 12–14, 1937	10,148 km (6,306 mi)	Mikhail Gromov + crew (Soviet Union)	Tupolev ANT-25	From Moscow to San Jacinto, California, US
1933	August 5–7, 1933	9,104 km (5,657 mi)	Maurice Rossi and Paul Codos (France)	Blériot 110 F-ALCC	From Floyd Bennett Field, New York to Rayak, Syria
1933	February 6–8	8,544 km (5,309 mi)	Royal Air Force Long Range Development Unit; O. R. Gayford and Gilbert Nicholetts	Fairey Long-range Monoplane K1991	From Cranwell, UK, to Walvis Bay, South Africa
1931	October 5	8,851 km	Clyde Pangborn and Hugh Herndon	Bellanca CH-400 or Bellanca J-300 Long Distance Special Miss Veedol	From Wenatchee Washington to Misawa Japan
1931	July 28–31	8,066 km	Russell Boardman and John Polando	Bellanca J-300 Special Cape Cod NR761W	From Floyd Bennett Field to Yeşilköy Airport -present day Atatürk Airport-, Istanbul
1929	December 15–19, 1929	8,029.44 km	Dieudonné Costes and P. Codas	Breguet 19 Super Bidon Point d'Interrogation	Closed-circuit record.
1929	September 27–29, 1929	7,905.140 km	Dieudonne Costes and Maurice Bellonte	Breguet 19 Super Bidon Point d'Interrogation	Paris to Qiqihar, China.
1928	July 3–5, 1928	7,188.26 km	Arturo Ferrarin and Carlo del Prete	Savoia Marchetti S.64	From Montecelio (Italy) to Touros (Brasil). Distance in a straight line. FAI Database ID#9108
1927	June 28–29	3,862.43 km	Albert Francis Hegenberger and Lester Maitland	Fokker F.VII	From California to Hawaii, the longest open sea flight up to that date, in the "Bird of Paradise". They received the Mackey Trophy and the Distinguished Flying Cross from President Calvin Coolidge for this achievement.
1927	May 20–21, 1927	5,809 km	Charles Lindbergh	Ryan NYP, Spirit of St. Louis	Single pilot flight, New York to Paris
1926	October 28–29, 1926	5,396 km (3,353 mi)	Dieudonné Costes and Jean Rignot	Breguet 19 GR	From Paris–Le Bourget Airport to Djask, Iran
1926	August 31 – September 1, 1926	5,174 km	Léon Challe and René Weiser	Breguet 19 GR	From Paris–Le Bourget Airport to Bandar Abbas
1926	July 14–15, 1926	4715.90 km	André Girier and François Dordilly	Breguet 19 GR	From Paris to Omsk
1926	June 26–27, 1926	4313 km	Ludovic Arrachart and Paul Arrachart	Potez 28	From Paris to Basrah, Iraq
1925	August 30–31, 1925	3,206 km	CDR John Rodgers (USN)	PN-9 Flying Boat	From San Francisco and Honolulu by Seaplane over open water without visual navigational aides.
1925	August 7–9, 1925	4,400 km	Maurice Drouhin and Jules Landry	Farman F.62 Goliath	Closed circuit Chartres–Étampes–Toussus–Chartres.
1925	February 3–4, 1925	3,166.30 km	Ludovic Arrachart and Henry Lemaitre	Breguet 19	Distance in a straight line record. Étampes–Villa Cisneros.
1923	April 16–17, 1923	4,050 km	Oakley G. Kelly and John A. Macready	Fokker T.2	Closed circuit around Dayton, Ohio
1920	June 3–4, 1920	1,915.2 km	L Boussoutrot and J Bernard	Farman Goliath	Closed-circuit record
1919	June 14–15, 1919	3,040 km	John Alcock and Arthur Brown	Vickers Vimy	Flew non-stop from St. John's, Newfoundland, to Clifden, Connemara, in 15 hours 57 minutes
1914	February 7, 1914	1,699 km	Karl Ingold	Mercedes Aviatik-Pfeil	He flew continuously from 7:35 am until 11:55 pm covering 1,056 miles in 16 hours and 20 minutes.
1903	December 17, 1903	279 m	Wilbur Wright	Wright Flyer	59 seconds
1903	December 17, 1903	39 m	Orville Wright	Wright Flyer	12 seconds
1852	September 24, 1852	27.36 km (17 miles)	Henri Giffard	The Giffard airship	Over an hour

== Commercial aircraft ==
Year	Date	Distance	Pilot	Aircraft	Reference
2005	November 9, 2005	21,601 km	Suzanna Darcy-Henneman, Richard Austin, John Cashman, Mathew Mathew, Frank P. Santoni Jr, Philip Schultz, Rodney Skaar	Boeing 777-200LR	Hong Kong International Airport to London Heathrow Airport the long way round taking 22 hours, 22 minutes
1997	April 2, 1997	20,045 km	Frank P. Santoni Jr, Richard Austin, John Cashman, Charles Hovlano, Joseph McDonald, James McRoberts, Rodney Skaar	Boeing 777-200ER	Malaysia Airlines delivery flight from Boeing Field, Seattle to Kuala Lumpur International Airport in 21 hours and 23 minutes.
1993	June 16 to 18, 1993	19,246 km	Pierre Baud, Gérard Guyot, Nicholas "Nick" Warner, Bernard Ziegler	Airbus A340-200	Set two new records as it flew an around the world route. First flying 19,089 kilometres (11,861 mi; 10,307 nmi) from Paris-Le Bourget Airport to Auckland, New Zealand in 21 hours and 32 minutes. After a 5 hour layover, the flight continued east-bound on a slightly longer route back to Paris-Le Bourget flying 19,246 kilometres (11,959 mi; 10,392 nmi), covering a great circle distance of 18,541 kilometres (11,521 mi; 10,011 nmi) in 21 hours and 46 minutes.
2011	December 6, 2011	19,142 km	Michael Carriker, Chad Lundy, Gregory McCann, William Roberson, Rodney Skaar, Christine Walsh	Boeing 787-8	Boeing Field to Shahjalal International Airport, Dhaka, Bangladesh in 21 hours and 43 minutes on a trans-atlantic eastward route.
2020	April 14 to 15, 2020	18,209 km		Boeing 777-300ER	Virgin Australia ferry flight from Charles de Gaulle Airport to Brisbane Airport in 19 hours and 45 minutes; returning after evacuating French citizens from New Zealand due to the COVID-19 pandemic.
2019	November 14 to 15, 2019	17,750 km		Boeing 787-9	Qantas Between London Heathrow and Sydney in 19 hours and 19 minutes.
2013	June 6, 2013	17,312 km		Airbus A330-200	Delta Air Lines ferry flight between Singapore and Atlanta in 18 hours and 34 minutes; returning from extensive cabin renovations.
1989	August 16 to 17, 1989	17,039 km	David Massy-Greene	Boeing 747-400	Qantas delivery flight from London Heathrow to Sydney in 20 hours and 9 minutes.
2002	December 24, 2002	16,901 km	Bruce Simpson, David Collier, Bruce Van Eyle, James Peach	Airbus A330-200	Qantas between Toulouse and Melbourne in 20 hours 4 minutes.
2004	June 28, 2004	16,467 km		Airbus A340-500	Singapore Airlines between Singapore and Newark, New Jersey, in a scheduled time of 18 hours 20 minutes covering approximately 16,600 km. It was the longest regularly scheduled commercial flight except until termination on November 23, 2013, and relaunch on October 18, 2018 until being surpassed in 2020.
2019	October 18 to 20, 2019	16,200 km		Boeing 787-9	Qantas between New York and Sydney in 19 hours 16 minutes.
2003	November 5, 2003	15,300 km		Boeing 777-300ER	Boeing Company between Sydney and Recife, Brazil in 18 hours 25 minutes. ETOPS test flight.
2017	February 5, 2017	14,535 km		Boeing 777-200LR	Qatar Airways between Doha and Auckland in 16 hours 10 minutes, formerly the world's longest commercial flight.
2004	February 3, 2004	14,093 km		Airbus A340-500	Singapore Airlines between Singapore and Los Angeles in 14 hours 42 minutes.
1988	September 17, 1988	14,042 km		Boeing 767-200ER	Air Mauritius between Halifax and Mauritius in 16 hours and 27 minutes.
2026	July 27–28, 2026	23,075 km	3 Airbus Test Pilots (Xavier Pepin as captain and two unknown) and 2 Qantas Pilots (Andrew Coull, David Summergreene)	Airbus A350-1000ULR	Nonstop test flight for Qantas' Project Sunrise from Melbourne eastwards across North America to Toulouse, taking 24 hours and 24 minutes.

=== Shortest distance ===
The Loganair Westray to Papa Westray route and its return flight make up the shortest flight distance for any scheduled air carrier service. The route is 2.8 km (1.7 miles), and travel time, including taxi, is usually less than two minutes. The route is served by Loganair airlines' Britten-Norman Islander aircraft and links the island of Westray and the town of Kirkwall, on the Orkney Islands in Scotland. This record was established when service began in 1967, and the route is contracted to continue until March 2029.

== Other types of aircraft ==
Date	Measurement	Person	Aircraft	Reference
January 21, 2003	3,008.8 km	Klaus Ohlmann and Karl Rabeder	Schempp-Hirth Nimbus-4	The gliding flight consisted of four legs along the eastern side of the Andes mountain range. The flight time of 15h 8m giving an average speed of almost exactly 200 km/h.
March 21, 1999	40,814 km	Bertrand Piccard and Brian Jones	Breitling Orbiter	Distance record for a balloon
January 31, 2015	10,711 km	Troy Bradley and Leonid Tiukhtyaev	Two Eagles Balloon	Distance record for a straight gas balloon
April 23, 1988	115.11 km	Kanellos Kanellopoulos	Daedalus 88	Straight distance record for Humanpowered aeroplane. This record was achieved by flying from Heraklion to Santorini Island for 3 h 54 min 59 sec.

== See also ==
- Flight length
- Flight endurance record
- Cross-America flight air speed record
- Aerial circumnavigation
- Longest flights
