= Virgin Atlantic GlobalFlyer =

Airplane

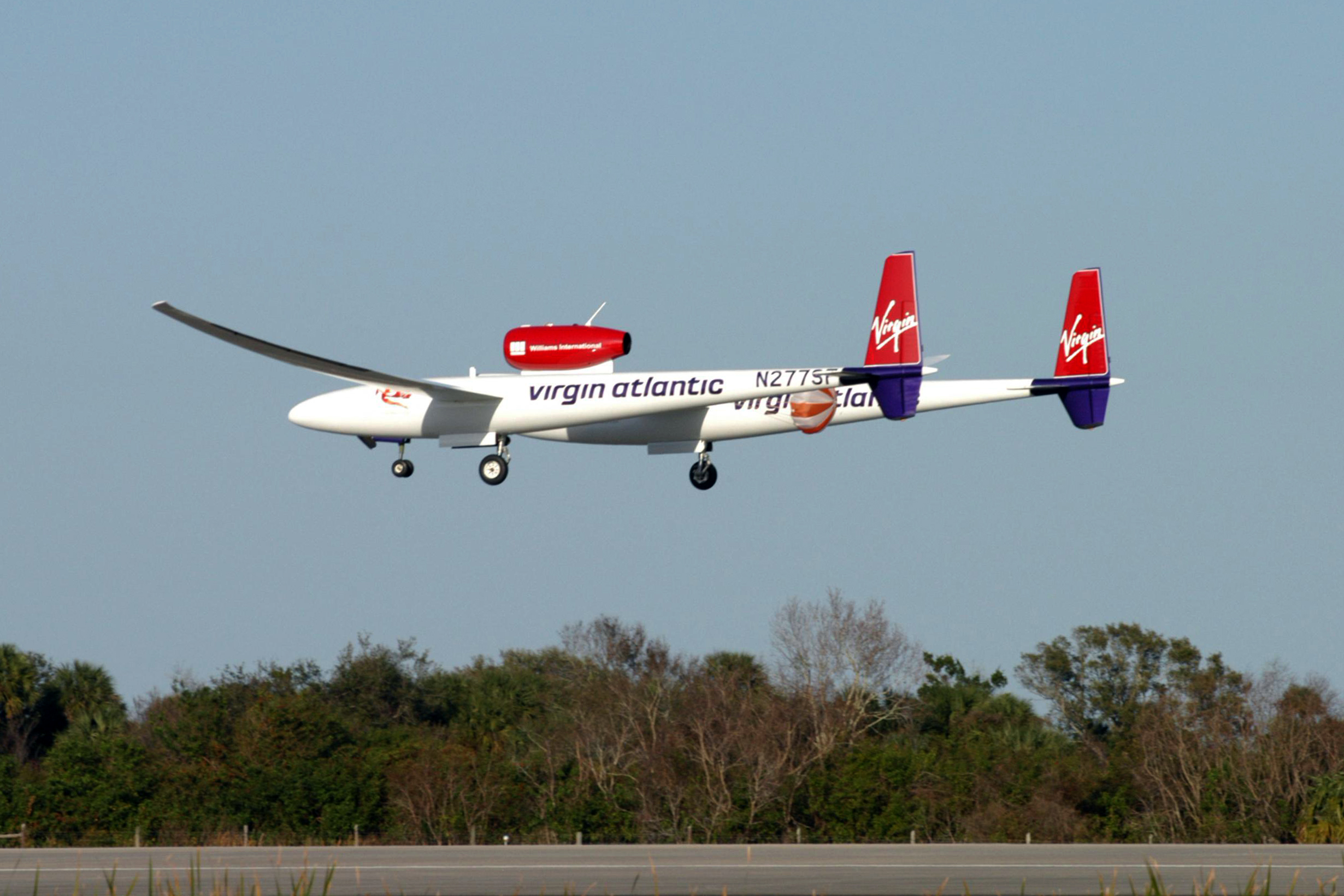
- GlobalFlyer arriving at the Kennedy Space Center

General information
- Type: Long-range aircraft for record attempt
- Manufacturer: Scaled Composites
- Designer: Burt Rutan
- Status: retired
- Primary user: Steve Fossett
- Number built: 1
- Registration: N277SF

History
- First flight: 2005
- Retired: March 17, 2006
- Preserved at: National Air and Space Museum Steven F. Udvar-Hazy Center

The Scaled Composites Model 311 Virgin Atlantic GlobalFlyer (registered N277SF) is an aircraft designed by Burt Rutan in which Steve Fossett first flew a solo nonstop airplane flight around the world in slightly more than 67 hours (2 days 19 hours) in 2005. The flight speed of 342 miles per hour (550 km/h) set the world record for the fastest nonstop non-refueled circumnavigation, beating the mark set by the previous Rutan-designed Voyager aircraft at 9 days 3 minutes with an average speed of 116 miles per hour (187 km/h).

The aircraft was owned by the pilot Steve Fossett, sponsored by Richard Branson's Virgin Atlantic airline, and built by Burt Rutan's company, Scaled Composites. The two companies subsequently worked together on Virgin Galactic.

In February 2006, Fossett flew the GlobalFlyer for the longest aircraft flight distance in history: 25,766 miles (41,466 km).

== Design and construction ==
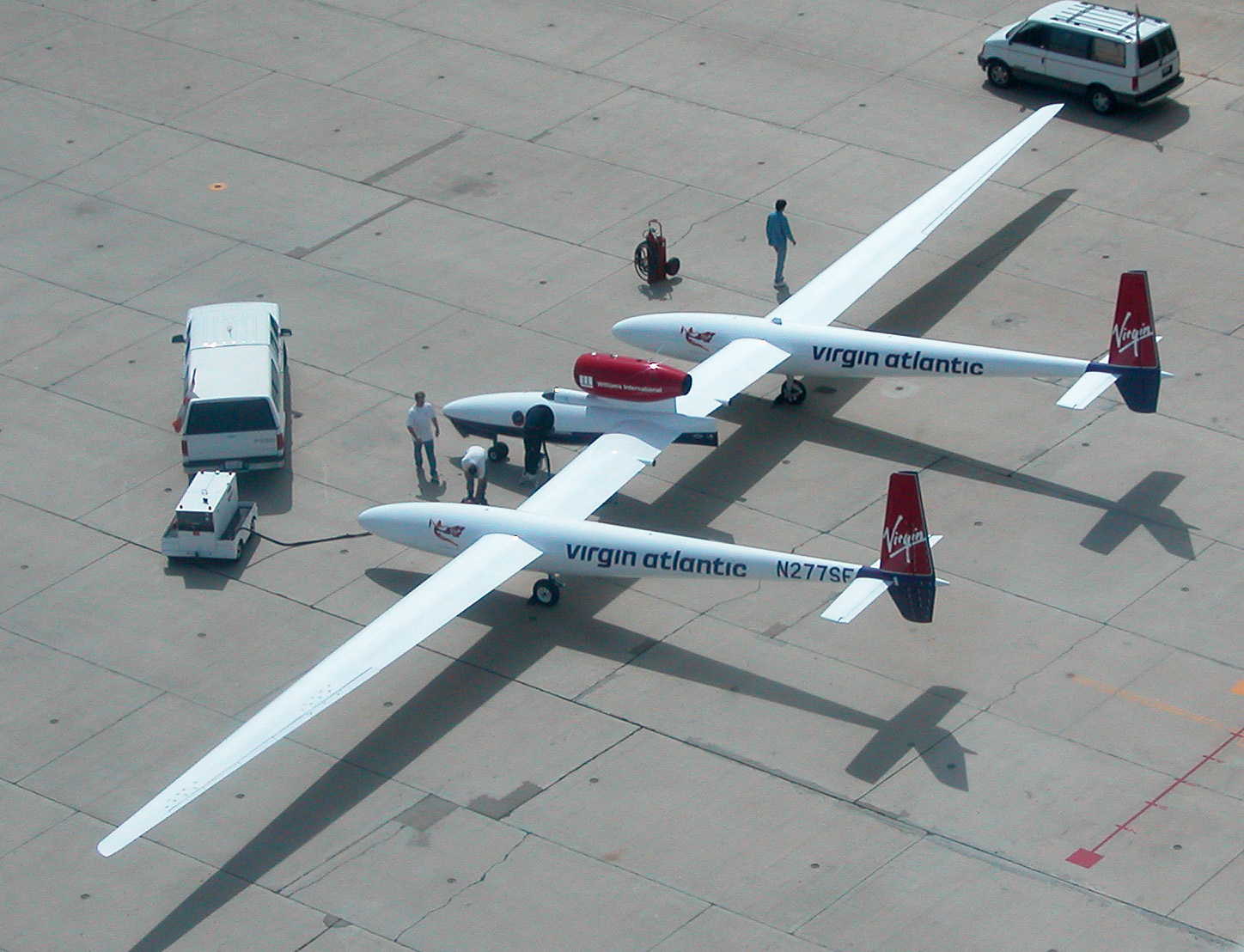
The GlobalFlyer has twin tail booms and a single FJ44 jet over the short fuselage.

The GlobalFlyer was specifically designed to make an uninterrupted (non-refueled) circumnavigation of the globe with a single pilot. Unusual for a modern civil aircraft, the GlobalFlyer has only a single jet engine.

The GlobalFlyer has twin tail booms mounted outboard of a shorter central fuselage nacelle. The pressurized cockpit is located in the front of the fuselage and provides 7 feet (2.1 m) of space in which the pilot sits. The single turbofan engine is mounted in an unusual position above the fuselage at a point several feet behind the cockpit, a similar arrangement to that on the Heinkel He 162 and Cirrus Vision SF50. The outboard booms contain large fuel tanks and end in tail surfaces, which are not cross-connected.

The aircraft is constructed of carbon fiber reinforced plastic, the main structural member being a high-aspect-ratio single-spar wing of 114-foot (35 m) span. The wings are made of high-strength composite materials with the skin of the aircraft being a graphite/epoxy and Aramid honeycomb. The use of lightweight materials permits the fuel (in 13 tanks) to compose 83% of the take-off weight.

The aircraft had an estimated lift-to-drag ratio of 37. The aerodynamic drag is so low that, even with the engine idling, the aircraft can only descend at a maximum of 700 feet per minute (3.6 m/s). Twin drogue parachutes were used to slow the GlobalFlyer to landing speeds.

The earlier Voyager aircraft structure had been by necessity built so lightly that it significantly deflected under aerodynamic loading. Learning from this experience, Rutan designed the GlobalFlyer to have greater stiffness. A design using a single jet engine was chosen for the GlobalFlyer for increased reliability over piston engines and faster circumnavigation for the solo pilot.

The GlobalFlyer is designed to operate at high altitudes, where the air is colder, yet in-tank fuel heaters were not included in its design. There was some concern that the fuel might freeze if the aircraft used standard jet fuel. Therefore, the GlobalFlyer's Williams International FJ44-3 ATW turbofan (which normally takes Jet-A fuel), was re-calibrated to burn JP-4, which has a substantially lower freezing point.

== First solo nonstop circumnavigation ==
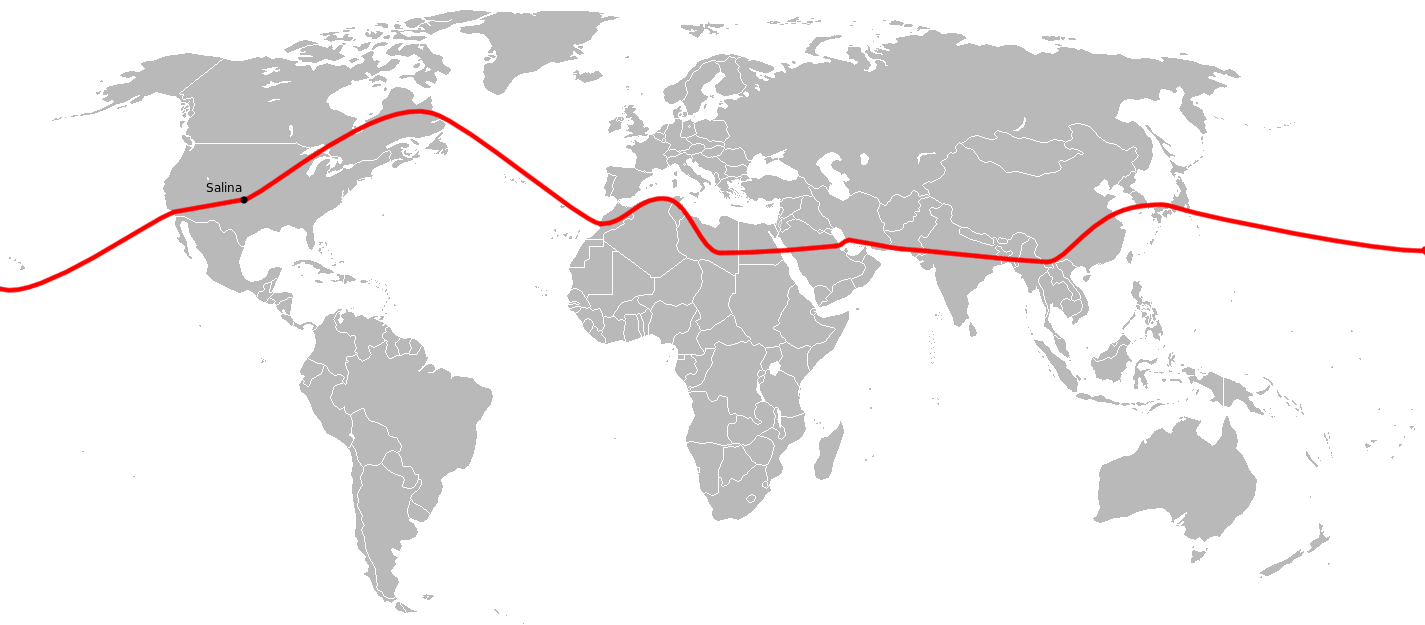
First solo non-stop round-the-world route

In January 2005, following solo test flights at Mojave, California, by Chief Engineer Jon Karkow and pilot Steve Fossett, Fossett moved the GlobalFlyer to the Salina Municipal Airport in Salina, Kansas, where a recently resurfaced runway of 12,300 feet (3,700 m) would accommodate the anticipated long takeoff roll. The circumnavigation attempt was delayed until 28 February 2005 to obtain a weather forecast with low turbulence for the fragile GlobalFlyer and good tailwinds.

Mission Control was at the Salina campus of Kansas State University, located adjacent to the Salina Municipal Airport.

A tailwind was essential to making the 22,858.729 miles (36,787.559 km) that it needed to fly to meet the FAI’s definition of circumnavigation, the length of the Tropic of Cancer. The GlobalFlyer was designed to complete the circumnavigation with minimal reserves of fuel. As it turned out, a design flaw in the fuel venting system resulted in the loss of about 2,600 lb (1,200 kg) of fuel early in the flight. This forced Fossett and Mission Control to consider terminating the flight as it reached the Pacific Ocean near Japan. Fossett chose to delay the final decision until he reached Hawaii. By that time, favorable winds encouraged the mission team to attempt to complete the circumnavigation.

GlobalFlyer landed at Salina at 19:50 UTC (13:50 CST) on 3 March 2005, having completed its circumnavigation in 2 days, 19 hours, 1 minute and 46 seconds. As of 2019, this is the fastest world trip in its class at a speed of 342 miles per hour (550 km/h). The distance flown was determined to be 22,936 miles (36,912 km), only 78 miles (125 km) above the minimum distance required.

== Longest distance aircraft flight (2006) ==
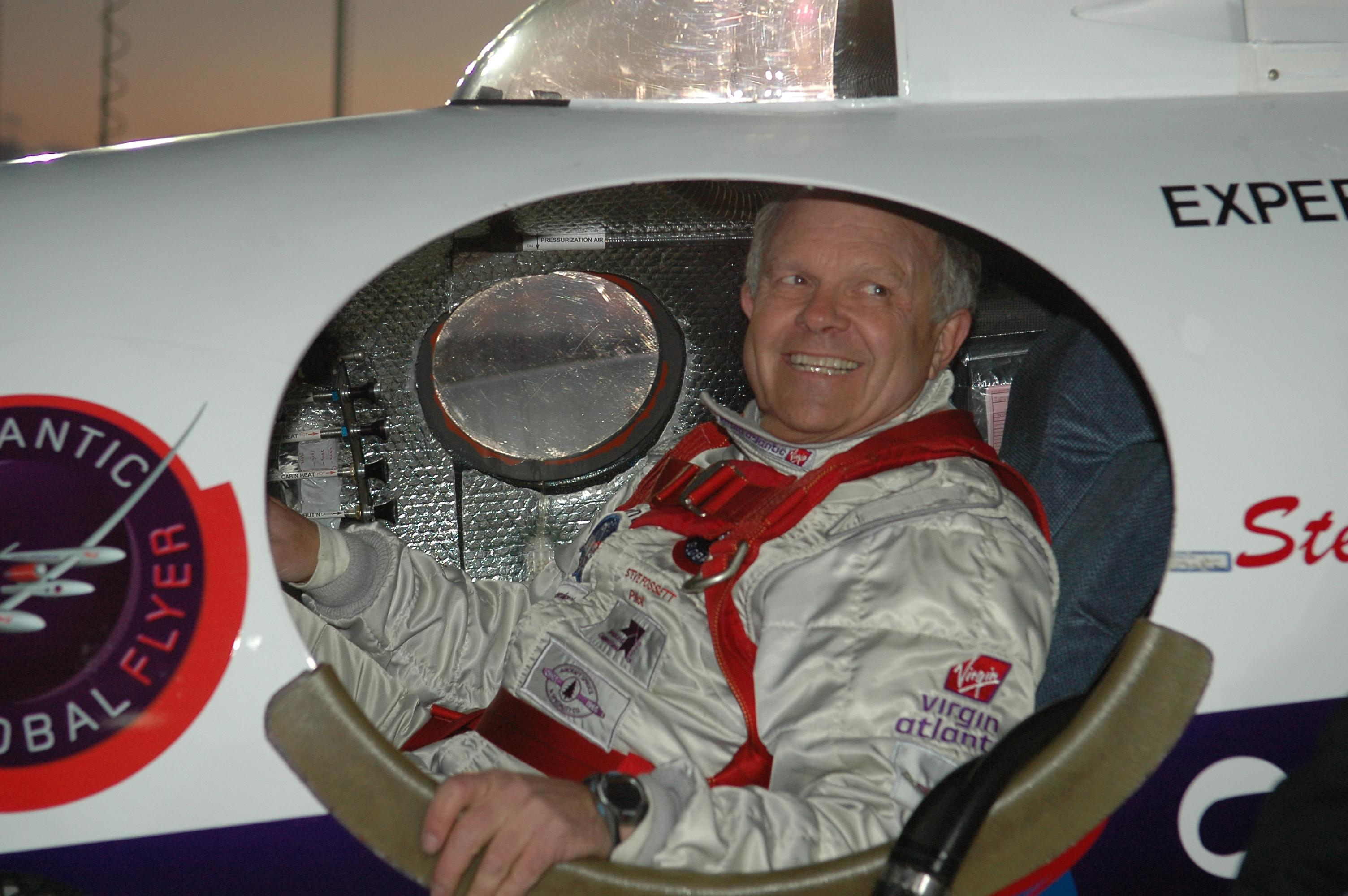
Steve Fossett in the GlobalFlyer cockpit

Fossett planned a second circumnavigation in the GlobalFlyer in 2006, this time taking off from the Kennedy Space Center in Florida, flying eastbound around the world then crossing the Atlantic a second time and then landing at Manston Airport in Kent, England.

The objective was to break the Absolute Distance Without Landing Record for airplanes and to exceed the longest distance by any kind of aircraft which was achieved by the Round the World Balloon flight of Bertrand Piccard and Brian Jones in 1999.

On 8 February 2006 at 12:22 UTC, GlobalFlyer took off and flew eastbound from Kennedy Space Center, and landed after 76 hours, 45 minutes with an official distance of 25,766 miles (41,466 km).

This distance set a new record for the longest aircraft flight in history, breaking the old records of 24,987 miles (40,213 km) in an airplane and 25,360 miles (40,810 km) in a balloon. The landing was made at Bournemouth Airport, England (short of the planned destination at Kent), because of a generator failure at 40,000 feet (12,000 m). Generator failure meant that Fossett had about 25 minutes until his batteries were exhausted, when he would have lost all electrical power. To add to the drama, ice on the inside of the canopy made vision difficult, with his landing being made virtually blind; one tire was flat from the takeoff roll and the remaining main tire burst on touchdown due to frozen brakes; and the fuel remaining was indicated to be only 200 lb (91 kg).

The aircraft survived the landing, with minor damage including a broken aileron hinge and a jammed intake valve.

== Closed-circuit distance flight and retirement ==
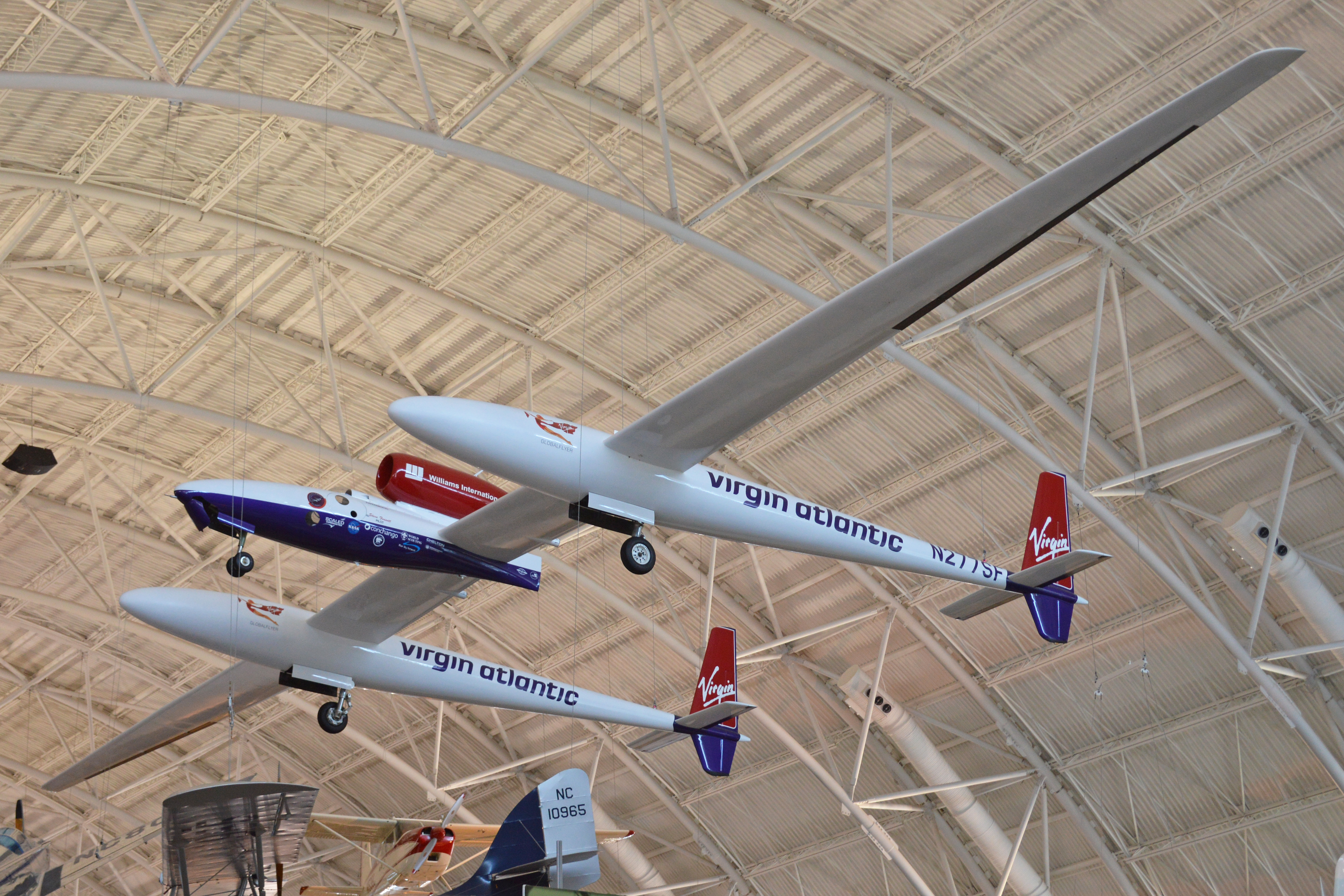
GlobalFlyer at the Udvar-Hazy Center in 2018

Fossett flew the GlobalFlyer to one more major aviation record: the absolute distance over a closed circuit. A closed-circuit record must take off and land at the same place, and the distance is measured over verifiable waypoints. Dick Rutan and Jeana Yeager had already flown the Voyager around the world in 1986, so a longer closed circuit course was needed to break their record. Fossett started in Salina, Kansas, on March 14, 2006, and flew eastbound around the world. Upon leaving Japan, he flew south and then tracked along the Equator in order to maximize the distance while crossing the Pacific Ocean. He landed in Salina on March 17 after traversing a total of 25,294 miles (40,707 km) to set a new absolute distance over a closed circuit record.

With this final record, the GlobalFlyer had set three of the seven absolute world records of airplanes as ratified by the Fédération Aéronautique Internationale. The GlobalFlyer is now on permanent display at the Smithsonian Institution National Air and Space Museum Steven F. Udvar-Hazy Center.

== Specifications ==
General characteristics

- Crew: 1
- Length: 44 ft 1 in (13.44 m)
- Wingspan: 114 ft 0 in (34.75 m)
- Height: 13 ft 3 in (4.05 m)
- Wing area: 400.0 sq ft (37.16 m^{2})
- Aspect ratio: 32.6
- Empty weight: 3,699 lb (1,678 kg)
- Gross weight: 22,099 lb (10,024 kg)
- Powerplant: 1 × Williams FJ44-2 turbofan, 2,480 lbf (11.01 kN) thrust

Performance

- Maximum speed: 342 mph (551 km/h, 298 kn)
- Range: 21,865 mi (35,188 km, 19,000 nmi)
- Service ceiling: 50,669 ft (15,444 m)
- Maximum glide ratio: 37

== See also ==
- Concorde holds the fastest refuelled circumnavigation
