= Misawa Aviation & Science Museum =

- 青森県立三沢航空科学館
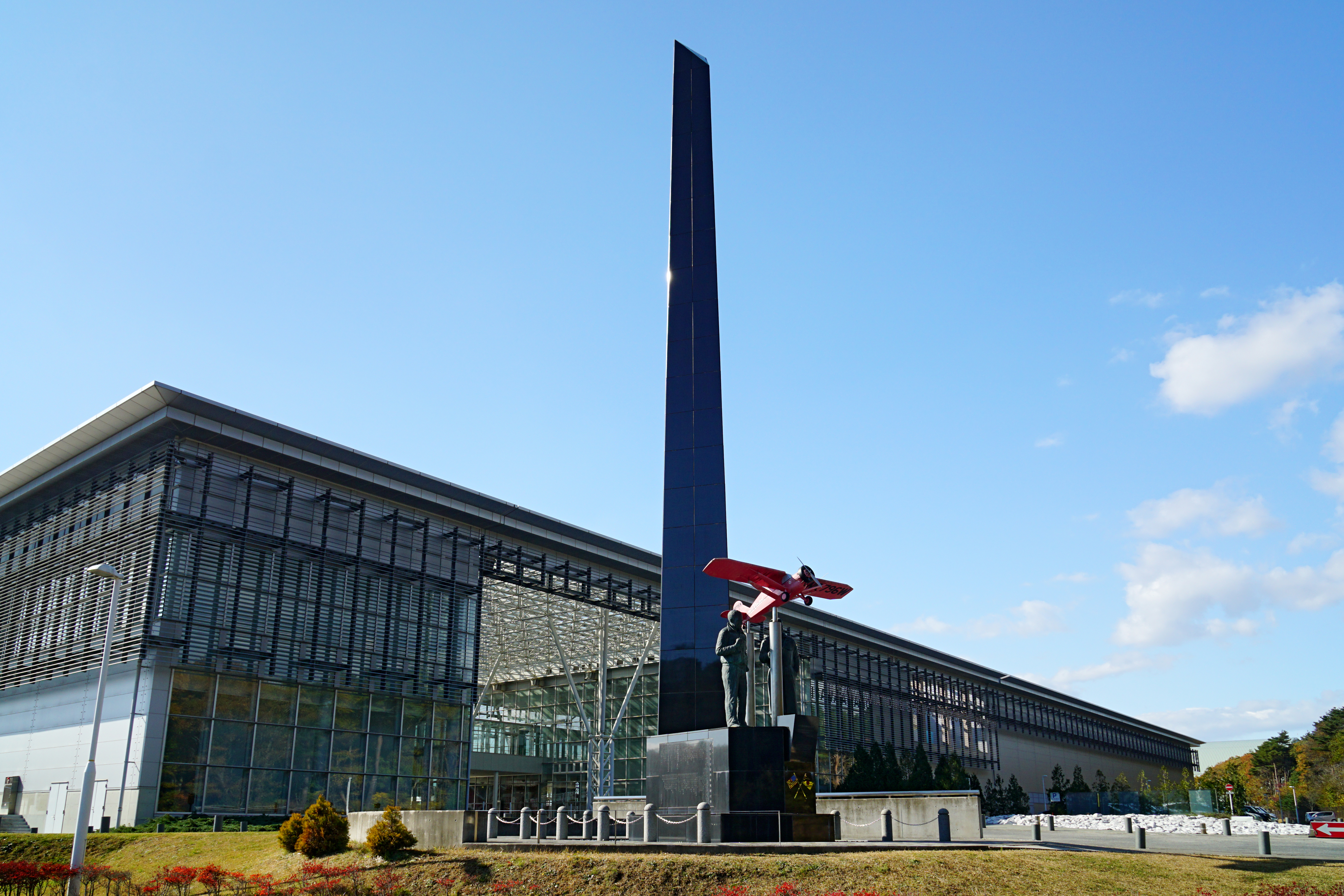

- Location within Aomori Prefecture Location within Japan

General information
- Location: Kitayama 158, Misawa, Aomori Prefecture, Japan
- Coordinates: 40°42′31.15″N 141°23′29.71″E
- Opened: August 8, 2003

Technical details
- Floor count: 3 above ground
- Floor area: 10,840.66 m2

Website
- www.kokukagaku.jp/01_museum/01_frame.html

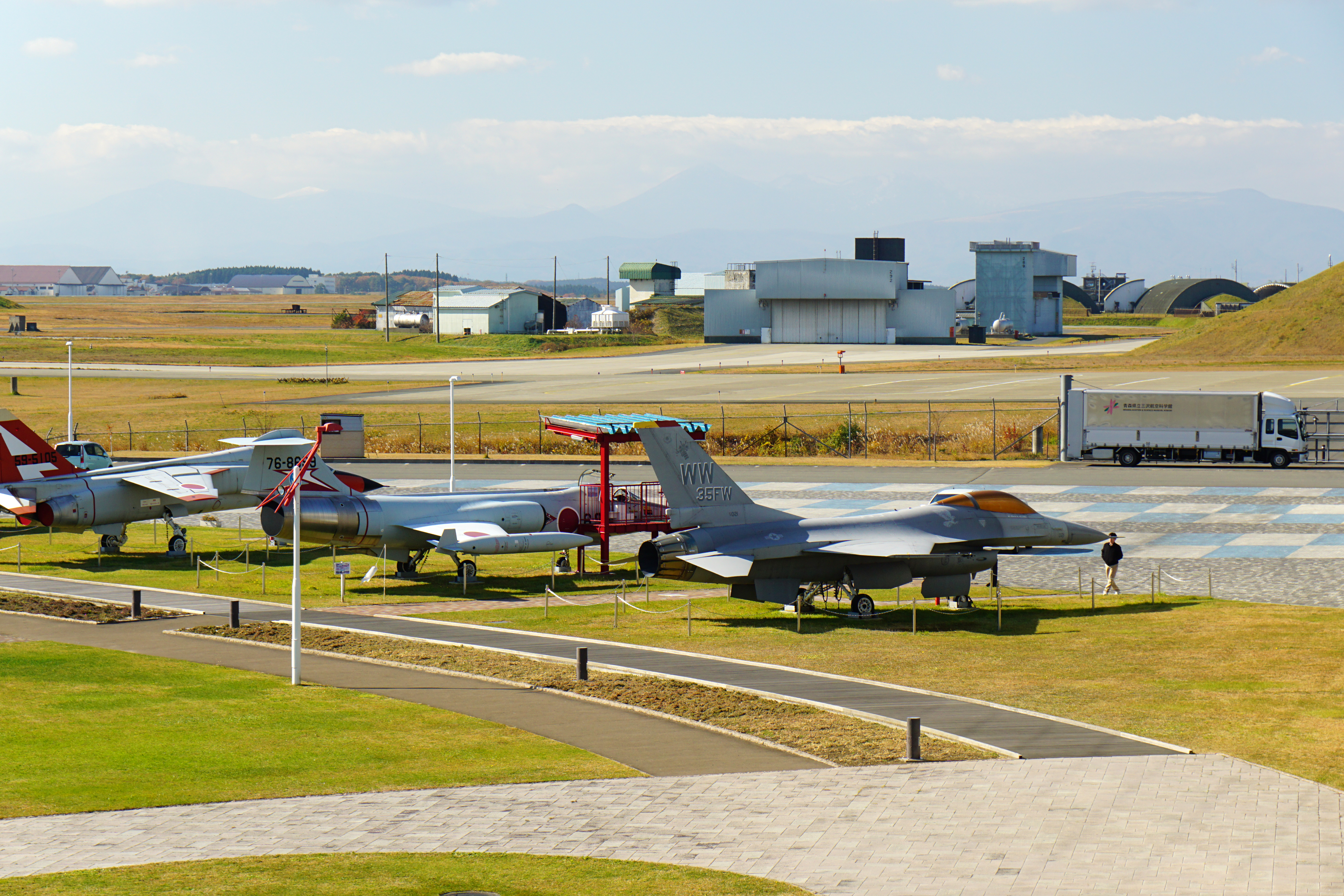
Aircraft at the Misawa Aviation & Science Museum

Misawa Aviation & Science Museum, Aomori (青森県立三沢航空科学館, Aomori Kenritsu Misawa Koku Kagaku Kan) is an aerospace museum in the city of Misawa, Aomori Prefecture, Japan. The museum was opened on August 8, 2003, and is located adjacent to Misawa Airport.

== History ==
The museum received an F-16 in 2005.

The prototype HondaJet was placed on display at the museum in April 2021.

== Museum building ==
The highlight of the display on the ground floor of the museum is a NAMC YS-11 formerly operated by Japan Air Commuter.

Other displays concentrate on the history of aviation, including a full-scale model of the Wright Flyer and of the Miss Veedol, the first aircraft to make a successful nonstop transpacific flight, which originated from Misawa's Sabishiro Beach in 1931. Other full-scale models include that of a Mitsubishi A6M Zero, Tachikawa Ki-54 and the Gasuden Koken, as well as a McDonnell Douglas DC-9 cockpit.

The second floor of the museum has flight simulators and displays on aerospace engineering and the third floor is an observation deck with a view of the runways of Misawa Air Base.

== Aircraft on display ==
- NAMC YS-11A-227, registration JA8776
- Westland WS-51 Dragonfly, registration JA7014
- General Dynamics F-16A, serial 78-0021
- McDonnell Douglas F-4EJ-kai, serial 57-8375
- Fuji T-3, serial 91-5516
- Lockheed T-33, serial 81-5344
- Lockheed F-104J serial 76-8699
- Lockheed UP-3A, serial 150526
- Mitsubishi F-1, serial 00-8247
- Mitsubishi T-2 (in Blue Impulse livery), serial 59-5108
- Mitsubishi T-2, serial 29-5177
- Mitsubishi LR-1, serial 2209
- Kawasaki/Hughes OH-6D, serial 30270
- Pitts Special S-1C, registration N122EZ

== See also ==
- List of aviation museums
