= Fairey Long-range Monoplane =

British experimental long-range aircraft

Long-range Monoplane II
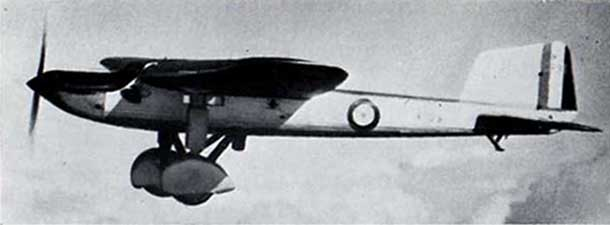

General information
- Type: Experimental aircraft
- National origin: United Kingdom
- Manufacturer: Fairey Aviation
- Primary user: Royal Air Force
- Number built: 2

History
- First flight: 14 November 1928

The Fairey Long-range Monoplane was a British experimental aircraft first flown in 1928. It was single-engine, high-wing aircraft with fixed tail skid landing gear. Two examples were built (Monoplane I and Monoplane II).

== Design and development ==
The aircraft was designed to meet Air Ministry Specification 33/27, issued by the Directorate of Technical Development (DTD) in December 1927 after the failure of three attempts by the RAF to break the absolute distance world record flying Hawker Horsley bombers. According to a Ministry spokesman in the House of Commons, this aircraft was to be constructed not just "for a specific record" but as a serious study into methods of increasing the range of aircraft. To soothe the anxieties of the Treasury, the aircraft started life as the Postal Aircraft. The pointed nose and sleek lines of the design gave rise to the nickname "Eversharp" after the American company producing mechanical pencils.

Although other configurations were studied, after wind tunnel testing a single high wing was chosen, allowing a gravity feed from the fuel tanks. The wing's spars were of wood with a steel pyramid system of internal bracing intended to add torsional rigidity and ensure that flight loads were evenly distributed between the spars irrespective of the position of the centre of pressure, and were fabric covered. The fuel capacity was 1,043 imp gal (4,740 L; 1,253 US gal). Fuel flowed by gravity to a small collector tank, from which it was pressure-fed to the engine by a mechanical fuel pump (if the mechanical pump failed, a wind-driven back-up pump could be extended into the windstream). To support long-range flight, there were two pilot-accessible parallel oil filter circuits, allowing one filter to be removed and cleaned with the other in operation. A bed aft of the wing allowed one pilot to sleep. After extensive testing using a Fairey IIIF and a DH.9A, the engine selected for the Monoplane was the Napier Lion XIA of 570 hp (430 kW); this decision was not finalised until Monoplane I was nearly complete.

== Operational history ==
Monoplane I, J9479, first flew on 14 November 1928 from RAF Northolt, with an RAF pilot. After correcting a few findings, Fairey transferred the aircraft to RAF operations on 7 December and testing continued in preparation for the record attempt, including a 24-hour trial on 22–23 March 1929. It was decided to attempt a flight to Bangalore in India, a great-circle distance of about 5,000 mi (8,000 km), comfortably over the existing record of 4,466 mi (7,187 km) set by a Savoia-Marchetti S.64 in July 1928. Squadron Leader A. G. Jones-Williams and Flight Lieutenant N. H. Jenkins set off from RAF Cranwell in Lincolnshire on 24 April 1929. Slowed by headwinds, they turned from their destination to land at Karachi after 50:48 hours flight time. Although the flight was the first non-stop flight between Britain and India, the great circle distance of 4,130 mi (6,650 km) was short of the record. It was decided to make another record attempt later that year, although the record had been raised to 4,912 mi (7,905 km) by the French Breguet 19 Point d'Interrogation. This time it was planned to fly from England to South Africa. This second attempt, with the same crew, departed on 16 December 1929, but crashed south of Tunis at 18:45, destroying the aircraft and killing the crew. The navigation log recovered from the crash site gave the aircraft's altitude at 18:00 as 5,000 ft (1,500 m), yet the aircraft's barographs had recorded an altitude of less than 3,000 feet (910 m) at that time. The impact point was 2,300 ft (700 m) above sea level. Either the barometric pressure had dropped significantly between Tunisia and Cranwell, leading them to believe that their altitude was greater than it was, or the altimeter had malfunctioned.

Despite the setback, the Air Ministry ordered a second example (K1991) in July 1930; this made its first flight on 30 June 1931. While similar to the first aircraft, it had a number of differences, including an enlarged and redesigned fin and rudder, greater redundancy in flight and navigational instrumentation, an autopilot (pneumatically powered, from an airstream-driven compressor) and lower-drag landing gear including wheel spats.

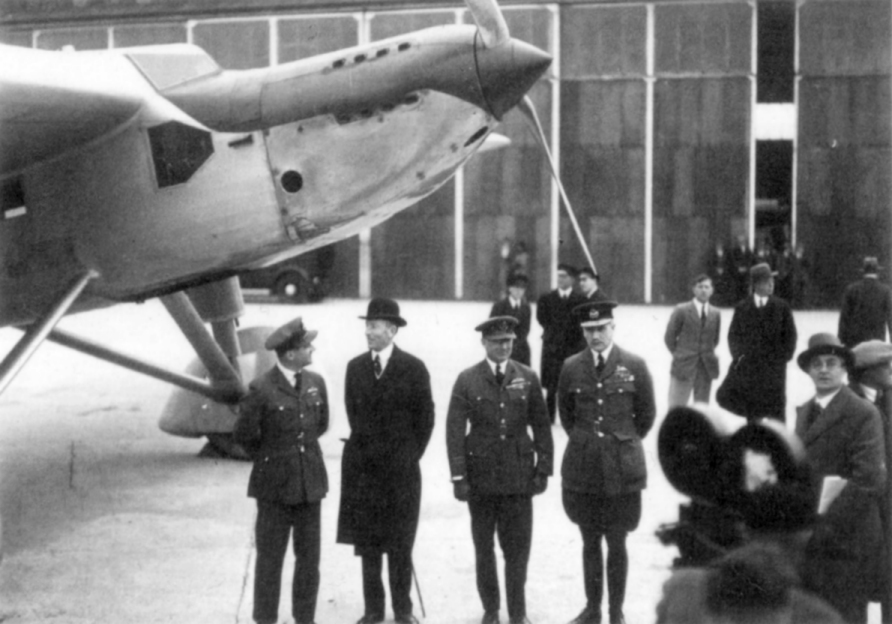
Gayford and Nicholetts with Lord Londonderry and Sir John Salmond with Monoplane II

On 27–28 October 1931 Squadron Leader O. R. Gayford (the officer in charge of the RAF Long Range Development Unit) with Flight Lieutenant D. Betts as navigator, flew K1991 from RAF Cranwell to Abu Seir in Egypt. The 2,557 miles (4,115 km) flight was completed in 31½ hours.

From 6 to 8 February 1933, Gayford and his navigator Flight Lieutenant Gilbert Nicholetts (Betts had died in 1932, after complications from a medical procedure) flew non-stop in the second aircraft, K1991, from Cranwell to Walvis Bay, South West Africa. This was a world long-distance record of 5,410 mi (8,710 km) (the autopilot gave up part way, with the remainder of the flight under manual control). They then continued on to Cape Town. On their return to RAE Farnborough they were met by Air Minister (Lord Londonderry), Under Secretary for Air (Sir Philip Sassoon) and Sir John Salmond, Marshal of the Royal Air Force.

The distance record stood for three months, falling on 7 August 1933 to the French, who reclaimed the record with a Blériot 110. Gayford and the Long Range Development Unit made later long-distance flights with the Vickers Wellesley. After K1991 flew back to the United Kingdom a number of suggestions to re-engine the aircraft were made and the Air Ministry issued Specification 27/33 for it to be re-engined with a Junkers Jumo diesel engine. Work was started, but it was decided to design a new aircraft instead and Monoplane II was scrapped after a few months in storage.

== Operators ==
United Kingdom

- Royal Air Force

== Specifications (Fairey Long-range Monoplane II) ==
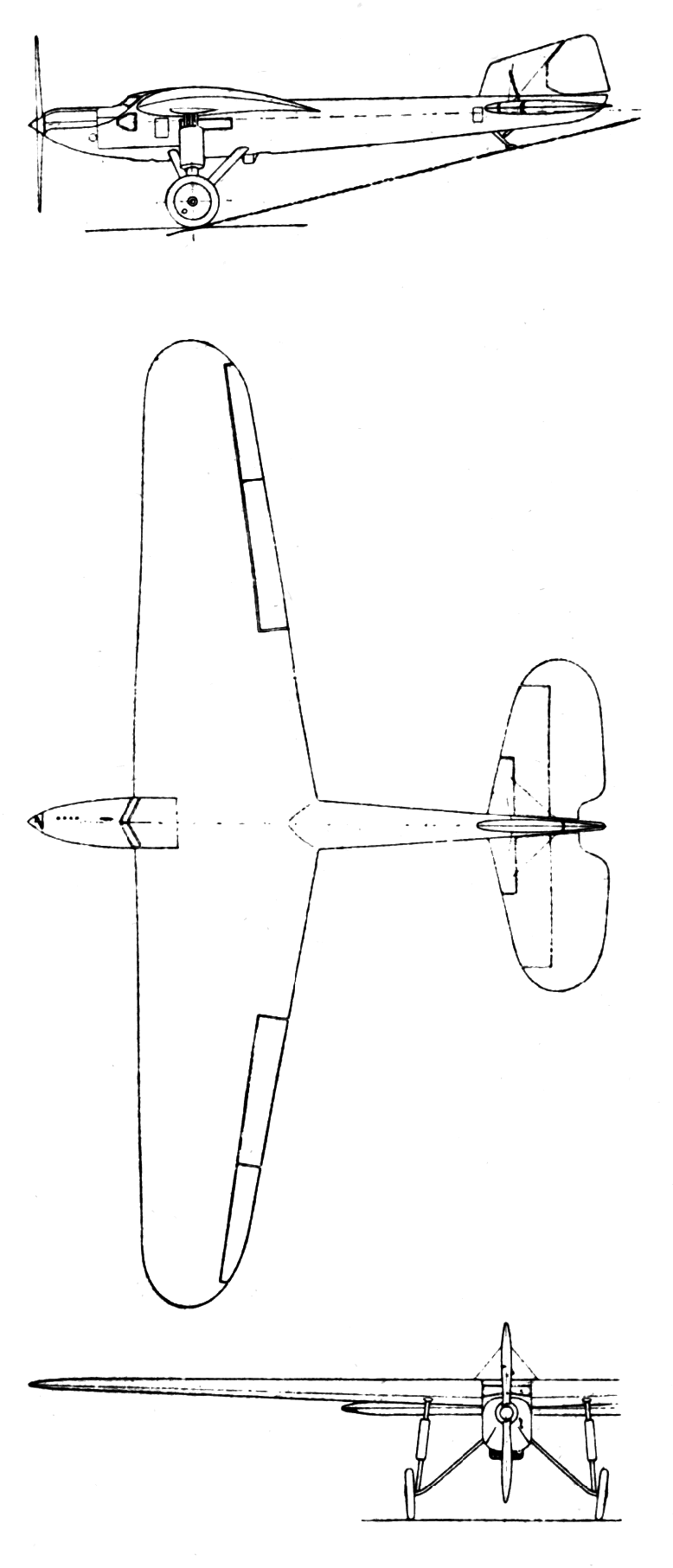
Fairey Long Range Monoplane I three-view drawing (from L'Aérophile September 1929)

Data from Fairey Aircraft since 1915

General characteristics

- Crew: Two
- Length: 48 ft 6 in (14.78 m)
- Wingspan: 82 ft 0 in (24.99 m)
- Height: 12 ft 0 in (3.66 m)
- Wing area: 850 sq ft (79 m^{2})
- Max takeoff weight: 17,500 lb (7,938 kg)
- Powerplant: 1 × Napier Lion XIa W-12 liquid-cooled piston engine, 570 hp (430 kW)
- Propellers: 2-bladed fixed-pitch propeller

Performance

- Cruise speed: 110 mph (180 km/h, 96 kn)
- Wing loading: 20.7 lb/sq ft (101 kg/m^{2})
- Power/mass: 0.033 hp/lb (0.054 kW/kg)
- Take-off run: 4,500 ft (1,372 m)

== See also ==
Aircraft of comparable role, configuration, and era

- Bernard 80 GR
- Blériot 110
- Bristol Type 138
- Dewoitine D.33
- Emsco B-8 Flying Wing
- Gasuden Koken
- Tupolev ANT-25

Related lists

- List of aircraft of the Royal Air Force
- Flight distance record
