= Gasuden Koken =

Japanese experimental long-range aircraft

Koken
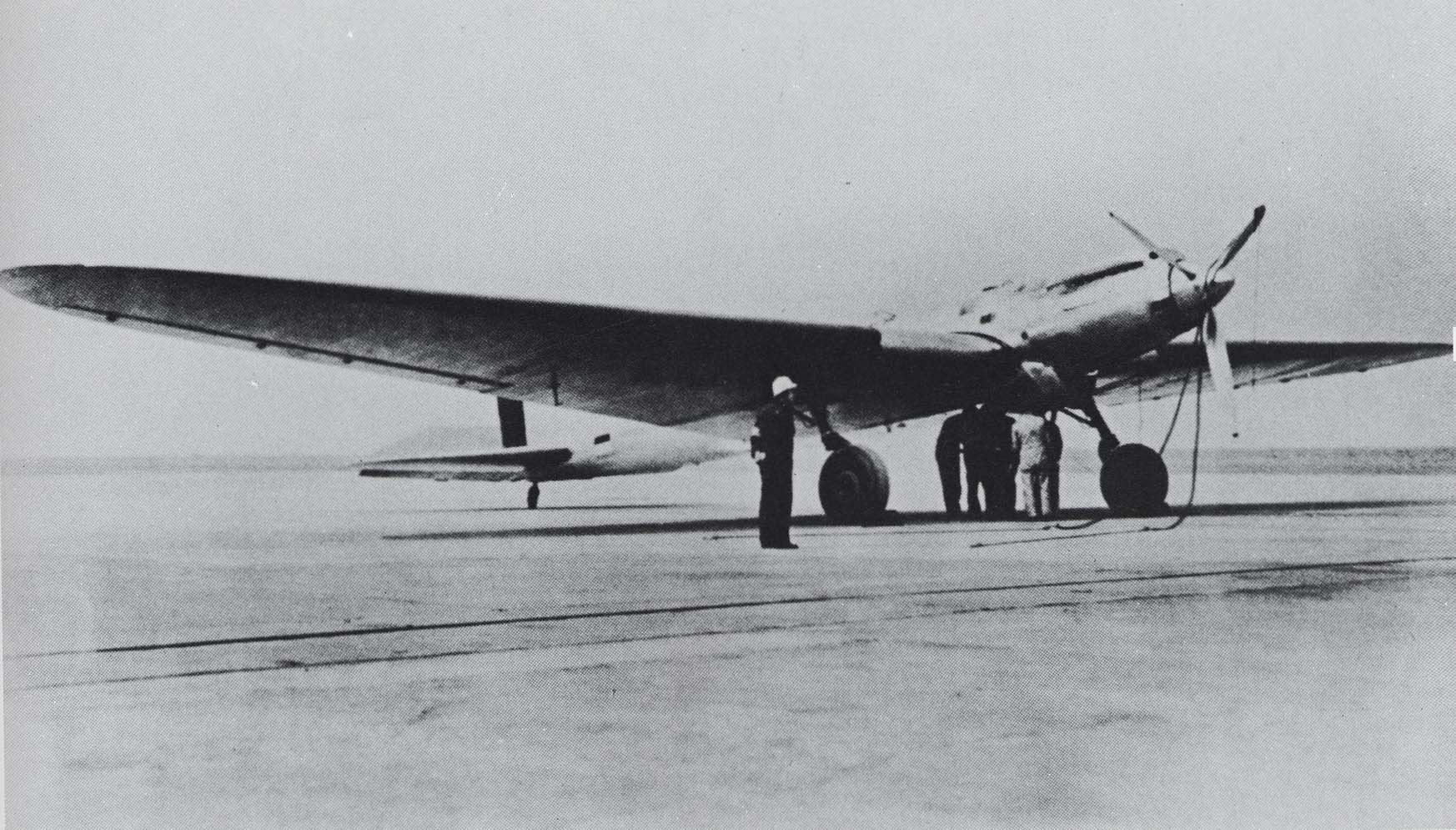

General information
- Type: Long range research aircraft
- National origin: Japan
- Manufacturer: Gasuden
- Number built: 1

History
- First flight: 25 May 1937

The Gasuden Koken (also known as the Kōken-ki (航研機)) was a Japanese long-range research aircraft of the 1930s. It was designed by the Aeronautical Research Institute of Tokyo Imperial University and built by the Tokyo Gas and Electric Industry (also known as Gasuden), to break the world record for longest flight, setting a closed circuit world record of 11,651.011 km (7,240 mi) in March 1938.

== Development and design ==
In 1931, the Aeronautical Research Institute of the Tokyo Imperial University commenced studies to design an aircraft to break the world closed-circuit distance record, gaining a grant from the Japanese Diet or parliament to finance the project. Initial design was completed in August 1934, and the Tokyo Gas and Electric Company (also known as Gasuden) was selected to build the aircraft, despite the fact that it had only limited resources, and had previously only built small numbers of wooden light aircraft. The design produced by the Aeronautical Research Institute and Gasuden was a single-engined low-wing cantilever monoplane with retractable undercarriage. It was of all-metal construction, with fabric-covered outer wings and control surfaces. While it was originally intended to be powered by a diesel engine, this proved impracticable, and in the end a modified version of the German BMW VIII gasoline-fuelled engine, license-built by Kawasaki, was chosen.

Construction was slow, and the aircraft was not completed until March 1937. It was first flown on 25 May 1937, piloted by Major Yuzo Fujita of the Imperial Japanese Army.

== Operational history ==
The first two attempts at breaking the record, on 13 November 1937 and 10 May 1938 were unsuccessful, owing to undercarriage problems and an autopilot failure respectively. The Koken-Ki took off for a third attempt from Kisarazu, Chiba at 04:55 on 13 May 1938, flying a four-sided course of 402 km (249 mi). After 29 laps of the circuit, at 19:21 on 15 May, it landed at Kisarazu, having flown a distance of 11,651.011 km (7,239 mi), a new world closed-circuit distance record. This record, which remains the only aviation record ever set by Japan that was recognised by the Fédération Aéronautique Internationale, the world governing body for aviation records, remained standing until August 1939, when it was broken by an Italian Savoia-Marchetti SM.82 which flew 12,936 km (8,038 mi).

The Koken-ki was used for occasional test flights, last flying in 1939, and survived World War II only to be burned following the end of the war.

A full-scale replica of the Koken-ki is on display at the Misawa Aviation & Science Museum in Misawa, Aomori.

== Specifications ==
Data from Japanese Aircraft, 1910–1941

General characteristics

- Crew: 3
- Length: 15.06 m (49 ft 5 in)
- Wingspan: 27.93 m (91 ft 8 in)
- Height: 3.60 m (11 ft 10 in)
- Wing area: 87.3 m^{2} (940 sq ft)
- Empty weight: 4,225 kg (9,315 lb)
- Gross weight: 9,216 kg (20,318 lb) (record flight)
- Powerplant: 1 × Kawasaki built BMW VIII water-cooled V12 engine, 533 kW (715 hp)

Performance

- Maximum speed: 250 km/h (160 mph, 130 kn)
- Cruise speed: 211 km/h (131 mph, 114 kn)
- Range: 11,651.011 km (7,239.603 mi, 6,291.043 nmi) (record distance)
- Service ceiling: 3,410 m (11,190 ft)

== See also ==
Aircraft of comparable role, configuration, and era

- Blériot 110
- Fairey Long-Range Monoplane
- Tupolev ANT-25
