= Dick Rutan =

Aviation pioneer (1938–2024)

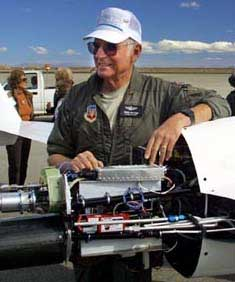
- Rutan standing next to the engine of the XCOR EZ-Rocket in 2001
- Born: Richard Glenn Rutan; July 1, 1938; Loma Linda, California, U.S.
- Died: May 3, 2024 (aged 85); Coeur d’Alene, Idaho, U.S.
- Education: Reedley College
- Occupations: Air Force pilot, test pilot
- Years active: 1959–2005
- Known for: Record-breaking aviator
- Political party: Republican
- Spouse(s): Geri Rutan (divorced); Kris Rutan
- Children: 2
- Relatives: Burt Rutan; Nell Rutan
- Call sign: "Killer" (USAF) KB6LQS (FCC)

Richard Glenn Rutan (July 1, 1938 – May 3, 2024) was an American military aviator and officer, as well as a record-breaking test pilot who in 1986 piloted the Voyager aircraft on the first non-stop, non-refueled around-the-world flight with co-pilot Jeana Yeager. He was the older brother of famed aerospace designer Burt Rutan, whose many earlier original designs Dick piloted on class record-breaking flights, including Voyager.

== Life and career ==
Dick Rutan was born in Loma Linda, California and raised in Dinuba, California, where he gained an interest in aviation at a young age. He learned to fly at age 15, taking his first solo flight on his 16th birthday, and later attended Reedley Junior College while waiting to report for the military. At Reedley College, he worked with aircraft engines toward getting an official FAA power plant license (also referred to as an Aviation Maintenance Technician). Through his interest in piloting, he went on to earn commercial, instrument, multiengine, seaplane and instructor certificates.

=== U.S. Air Force ===
After completing the Radar Intercept Officer Course, Rutan served as a McDonnell F-101B Voodoo Radar Intercept Officer with the 322d Fighter-Interceptor Squadron at Kingsley Field, Oregon, from December 1959 to September 1961, and then as a Northrop F-89 Scorpion Radar Intercept Officer with the 57th Fighter Interceptor Squadron at Keflavik Airport, Iceland, from September 1961 to October 1962. His next assignment was as a Douglas C-124 Globemaster II navigator with the 85th Air Transport Squadron at Travis AFB, California, from October 1962 to November 1965. He underwent Undergraduate Pilot Training, earning his Pilot Wings at Laughlin AFB, Texas, in December 1966.

=== Vietnam War ===
Rutan served during the Vietnam War as one of the founding members of the "Mistys" of Operation Commando Sabre, pioneering the use of tactical jets as a "FastFAC" (known as forward air control) for the FAC Airborne mission, which searched for and marked targets with white phosphorus rockets ahead of the strike package. He flew 325 missions but had to eject one time, when his North American F-100 Super Sabre aircraft was hit.

=== After the war ===
His next assignment was as an F-100 pilot with the 492nd Tactical Fighter Squadron and as a Flight Test Maintenance Officer with the 48th Tactical Fighter Wing at RAF Lakenheath, England, from November 1968 to April 1972. Rutan had to eject a second time in his Air Force career when his aircraft suffered an engine failure over England.

Rutan then served as a Flight Test Maintenance Officer with the 3030th Support Squadron at Wright-Patterson AFB, Ohio, from April 1972 to May 1975, followed by service as an LTV A-7 Corsair II pilot and Commander of the 355th Field Maintenance Squadron at Davis-Monthan AFB, Arizona, from May 1975 to August 1976. After completing an Operation Bootstrap degree program, Rutan served as Chief of the Training Division with the 355th Tactical Fighter Wing at Davis-Monthan AFB from January 1977 until his retirement from the Air Force on June 1, 1978.

During his career with the Air Force, Rutan was awarded the Silver Star, five Distinguished Flying Crosses, 16 Air Medals, and a Purple Heart. He retired from the Air Force in 1978 with the rank of lieutenant colonel.

=== Post military career ===
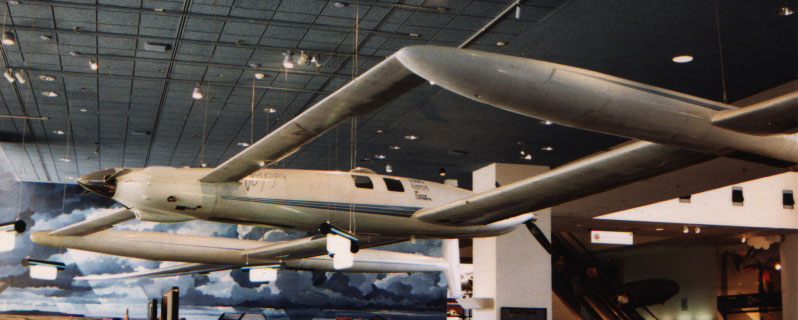
The Rutan Voyager, flown by Dick Rutan and Jeana Yeager, designed by Burt Rutan

Rutan also acted as a test pilot throughout his career, flying multiple designs such as the Fairchild T-46 in 1981 and the XCOR EZ-Rocket in 2001.

From December 14 to 23, 1986, Rutan flew with Jeana Yeager on the first unrefueled non-stop flight around the world in the Rutan Voyager, a design by his brother Burt. The flight took 9 days, 3 minutes, and 44 seconds and covered 24,986 miles (40,211 km). It attracted world wide media coverage and set multiple records. That same year, Yeager and the Rutan brothers were awarded the Gold Medal of the Royal Aero Club, the Presidential Citizens Medal from President Ronald Reagan, and the Collier Trophy for their achievement.

In 1997, Dick Rutan and Mike Melvill flew two personally-built Rutan Long-EZ kit aircraft side-by-side around the world. This "around the world in 80 nights" flight was called The Spirit of EAA Friendship World Tour, and some legs of it lasted for over 14 hours.

On December 3, 2005, in the XCOR EZ-Rocket, Rutan set the point-to-point distance record for a ground-launched, rocket-powered aircraft, flying 16 km from Mojave, California, to California City, California, in just under ten minutes. This was also the first official delivery of U.S. Mail by a rocket-powered aircraft. In recognition of this achievement, the FAI awarded Rutan the 2005 Louis Blériot Medal.

== Congressional campaign ==
In 1992, Rutan ran as a conservative Republican against Democratic congressman George Brown, Jr. in California's 42nd congressional district, consisting mostly of the San Bernardino region of southern California and viewed as a swing district. In the Republican primary, Rutan upset San Bernardino County Supervisor Rob Hammock, who had run a strong race against Brown in 1990. In the general election, Rutan ran on a platform that called for reforming Congress and lowering taxes. Brown, first elected in 1962, was long known for surviving close elections and prevailed with 79,780 votes (50.7%) to Rutan's 69,251 (44%). Fritz Ward, a Libertarian, received 8,424 votes or 5.3% of the vote.

== Death ==
Rutan died from pulmonary fibrosis as a complication of long COVID on May 3, 2024, at a hospital in Coeur d'Alene, Idaho. He was 85.

== Records ==
Besides the records Rutan set while flying the XCOR EZ-Rocket, which consisted of a point-to-point distance record and being the first official delivery of U.S. Mail by a rocket-powered aircraft, and while flying Voyager, which consisted of multiple absolute distance records, an airspeed record, and being the first plane to fly non-stop and unrefueled around the world, more than doubling the old distance record set by a Boeing B-52 strategic bomber in 1962, he also set a number in his personal Rutan VariEze and Long-EZ, including:

- FAI class C1b distance over a closed course of 2,636 km at Oshkosh, Wisconsin circa July–August 1975
- FAI class C1b distance over a closed course of 7,725.3 km at Mojave, California on December 15, 1979
- FAI class C1b distance of 7,344.56 km from Anchorage, Alaska to Grand Turk Island on June 5, 1981

Rutan believed that by engaging in a program of breaking class records he could further fine-tune his brother's homebuilt aircraft designs.

== Awards and honors ==
=== Military decorations and medals ===

US Air Force Senior Pilot Badge
Silver Star
Distinguished Flying Cross with Valor device and 3 bronze oak leaf clusters	Distinguished Flying Cross (second ribbon required for accouterment spacing)	Purple Heart
Air Medal w/ 3 silver oak leaf clusters	Air Force Commendation Medal w/ 1 bronze oak leaf cluster	Air Force Presidential Unit Citation
Air Force Outstanding Unit Award w/ Valor device	Combat Readiness Medal	National Defense Service Medal
Armed Forces Expeditionary Medal	Vietnam Service Medal w/ 3 bronze campaign stars	Air Force Longevity Service Award w/ 1 silver and 2 bronze oak leaf clusters
Small Arms Expert Marksmanship Ribbon	Republic of Vietnam Gallantry Cross	Vietnam Campaign Medal

=== Civilian awards ===
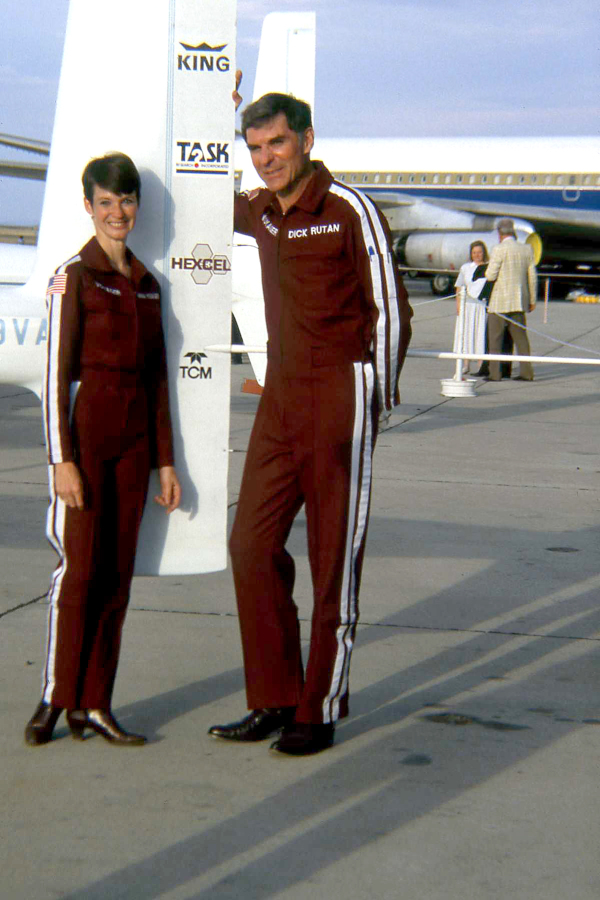
Rutan and Yeager in 1986

- 1981 – Louis Bleriot Medal - distance record
- 1985 – Society of Experimental Test Pilots (SETP) Jack Northrop Award (with Voyager co-pilot Jeana Yeager)
- 1986 – Presidential Citizens Medal (with the rest of the Voyager team: Jeana Yeager and Burt Rutan)
- 1986 – Collier Trophy (with Voyager team), for "the greatest achievement in aeronautics or astronautics"
- 1986 – De la Vaulx Medal (with Yeager), around-the-world flight in Voyager
- 1987 – Louis Bleriot Medal, around-the-world flight
- 1987 – National Air and Space Museum Trophy (with Yeager)
- 1987 – SETP Iven C. Kincheloe Award (with Voyager co-pilot Jeana Yeager)
- 1988 – Edward Longstreth Medal of the Franklin Institute
- 2002 – National Aviation Hall of Fame inductee at the National Museum of the United States Air Force
- 2005 – Louis Bleriot Medal, longest point-to-point rocket plane flight (XCOR EZ-Rocket)
- 2011 – International Air & Space Hall of Fame inductee at the San Diego Air & Space Museum
- 2013 – Flying magazine ranked him (along with Yeager) No. 33 on their list of the 51 Heroes of Aviation
- 2014 – SETP Fellow inductee
- 2022 – Mojave Air & Space Port is renamed "Rutan Field" in honor of the Rutan brothers' contributions
