= Jeana Yeager =

American aviator (b. 1952)

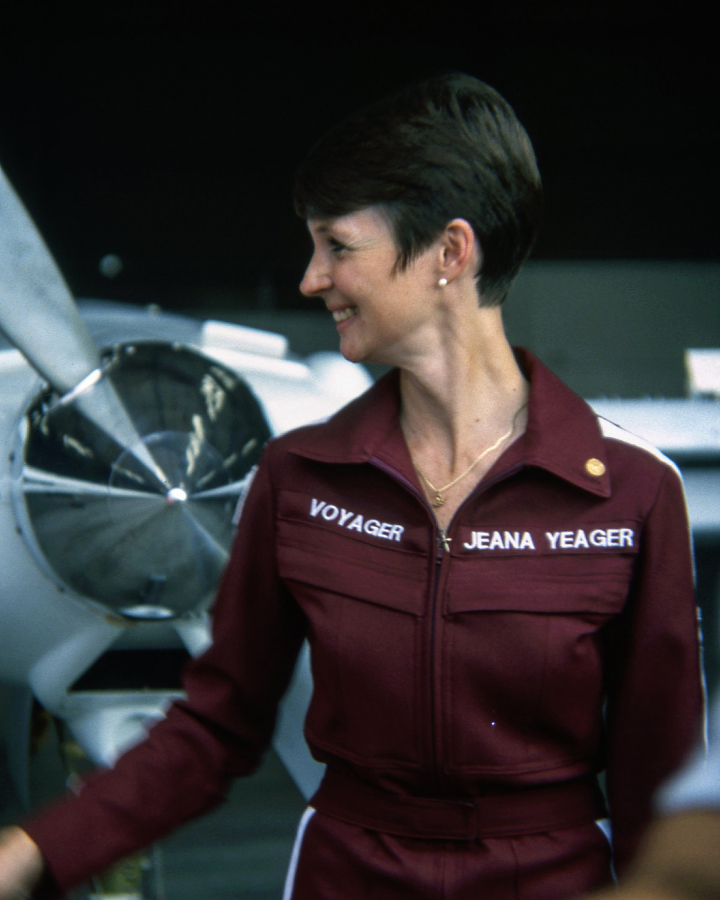
- Yeager in 1986 in front of Voyager
- Born: May 18, 1952 (age 74); Fort Worth, Texas, U.S.
- Spouse(s): Jon A. Farrar (1971–1976); William Z. Williams (1992–1994); Dale A. Rinehart (1994–1996)
- Awards: Presidential Citizens Medal; Harmon Trophy; FAI De la Vaulx Medal; Collier Trophy; Edward Longstreth Medal
- Aviation career
- Famous flights: The first non-stop, non-refueled flight around the world with Dick Rutan
- Flight license: 1978

Jeana Lee Yeager (born May 18, 1952) is an American aviator. She co-piloted, along with Dick Rutan, the first non-stop, non-refueled flight around the world in the Rutan Voyager aircraft from December 14 to 23, 1986. The flight took 9 days, 3 minutes, and 44 seconds and covered 24,986 miles (40,211 km), almost doubling the old distance record set by a Boeing B-52 strategic bomber in 1962.

== Early life and career ==
Jeana Lee Yeager was born on May 18, 1952, in Fort Worth, Texas, to Royal Leland "Lee" Yeager (March 12, 1918 – March 17, 2001) and Alice Evaree Snider (née Harris; October 21, 1924 – February 5, 2013). As a child, she and her family variously lived in Garland, Texas, Oxnard, California, and Commerce, Texas. Following graduation from high school, Yeager, at age 19, married a police officer; they divorced five years later. She then worked as a draftsman and surveyor for a geothermal energy company in Santa Rosa, California. In 1978, Yeager obtained her private pilot's license while still living in Santa Rosa.

Yeager worked for Robert Truax while he was developing a reusable spacecraft. She met Dick Rutan in 1980 and they soon both set distance records in the Rutan VariEze and Long-EZ planes, designed by Dick's brother Burt Rutan. In early 1982, Yeager set a new women's speed record for the 2,000-kilometer closed course and in the fall of 1984 using the VariEze, she set the open-distance record of 2,427.1 statute miles.

Despite both being aviators and sharing the same last name, Jeana Yeager is not related to the late Chuck Yeager.

== Round-the-world flight ==
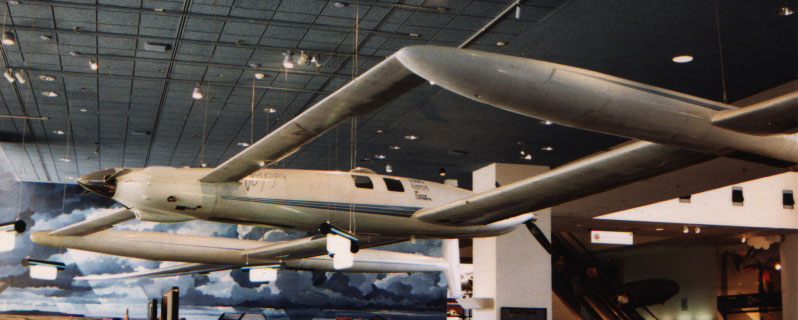
The Rutan Voyager

Yeager and Dick Rutan decided to attempt to fly around the world without refueling. They formed Voyager Aircraft, Inc., and Burt Rutan began designing the aircraft. Unable to find a commercial sponsor, Yeager created the Voyager Impressive People (VIP) program which became the major source of money to build, test, and fly the aircraft. By mid-1986, Voyager was ready for the flight. Yeager flew as co-pilot on the 216-hour flight and set a world absolute distance record. This was the first time a woman had been listed in an absolute category.

Dick Rutan and Voyager sued Yeager in 1995, alleging that she had misappropriated memorabilia and funds from Voyager. The lawsuit was dropped in 1996.

== Awards ==
- 1986 Harmon Trophy
- National Air and Space Museum Trophy, shared with Dick Rutan
- FAI De la Vaulx Medal, shared with Dick Rutan
- 1986 Presidential Citizens Medal, shared with Dick and Burt Rutan
- Collier Trophy (first female recipient), shared with Dick and Burt Rutan
- 1985 Society of Experimental Test Pilots Jack Northrop Award, shared with Dick Rutan
- 1987 Society of Experimental Test Pilots Iven C. Kincheloe Award, shared with Dick Rutan
- 1988: Franklin Institute Edward Longstreth Medal

In 2013, Flying magazine ranked Yeager and Dick Rutan No. 33 on their list of the 51 Heroes of Aviation.
