= Blériot 110 =

French experimental long-range aircraft

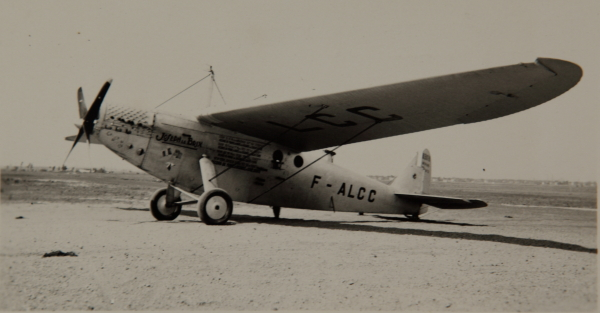

General information
- Type: Long-distance research aircraft
- Manufacturer: Blériot Aéronautique
- Designer: Filippo Zappata
- Number built: 1

History
- First flight: 16 May 1930

The Blériot 110 (or Blériot-Zappata 110) was a high-endurance research aircraft designed and produced by the French aircraft manufacturer Blériot Aéronautique. It was specifically developed to pursue new world records pertaining to long distance flights.

== Design and development ==
The Blériot 110 was developed specifically at the request of the ordered by the Service Technique of the French Air Ministry. Blériot Aéronautique, who opted to respond, designed a twin-seat high-wing monoplane that was primarily constructed of wood. The resulting aircraft exhibited a high degree of both fineness and lightness.

In terms of its basic configuration, the Blériot 110 comprised a fuselage with a heart-shaped cross section and a proportionally large wing. The fuselage had a high degree of fineness due to the narrowness of its principal section, which consequentially reduced the unutilised lower surface area of the wing. During testing, this shape was revealed to possess excellent penetration characteristics, in part due to the junction being positioned almost at a right angle, in comparison to the acute angles (and the resulting interference) that some alternative configurations would have involved. The frontal area of the fuselage was restricted to that deemed to be strictly necessary to accommodate the honeycomb radiator. While superior aerodynamic performance could have been achieved with a radiator that was mounted either on the sides of the fuselage or the wing, it was determined that those alternative arrangements were too immature to endure the continuous vibrations they'd be exposed to during high endurance flights. In terms of height, the fuselage was somewhat elongated and terminated at a single point at its base; this shape, via the combination of a cabane and a series of bracing wires (which weighed only 90kg/198lb), a relatively light wing with a large aspect ratio.

All together, the fineness of the aircraft was 17 when the wheels were cowled; it could reportedly be increased to nearly 19.5 by eliminating the undercarriage. Alternative models, including a rectangular and an elliptical configuration, were studied. The propeller was lowered as much as was practical to be done, which brought the slipstream beneath the wing; the distance between the propeller and the leading edge of the wing was only four meters (13.12 ft). The structure of the fuselage comprised a ventral keel and a pair of upper longerons; the transverse structure comprised a series of bulkheads and intermediate frames; the spaces between these objects were occupied by formers. The fuselage covering was load-bearing, consisting of three layers of whitewood strips that were both glued and nailed to the framework along with a fabric covering; the exterior was fairly smooth, resistant to torsion, and exhibited none of the bulging common to plywood construction.

The wing was manufactured in three parts, an arrangement that permitted it to be readily transported along the public road network, the benefits of which was seen as advantageous enough to offset the minor weight increase over a single piece counterpart. The twin spars of the wing were connected via an oblique aileron supporting spar; this arrangement permitted stresses to be conveyed between the forward and rear spars and thus permitted a lighter structure than would have otherwise been possible without such a connection being present. Furthermore, the aileron-supporting spar, which was securely attached at three separate points, also considerably bolstered the torsional resistance while also being much lighter than a traditional spar that would have been secured only at one end. It was reported that the total weight of the wing was roughly 50 percent of what a cantilever counterpart would have had with the same aspect ratio.

Both of the pilots' positions were enclosed within the fuselage; as means of addressing the restrictive external visibility that this arrangement incurred, portholes were present to give the pilots some degree of lateral visibility while a forward view was obtainable using a periscope, the latter being particularly critical during take-offs and landings. The cockpit was provisioned with various controls and instrumentation, which included a pitch indicator, altimeter, two tachometers, multiple fuel gauges, inlet and outlet oil thermometers, ignition advance, dumping control, fuel cocks, fire alarm, carburetor heater, clock, map holder, and a wheel to adjust the stabiliser amongst others. Safety measures included provisions for the use of fire extinguishers and parachutes.

The aircraft was outfitted with six fuel tanks in the wings and four in the fuselage, holding a combined total of 6,000 L (1,319 Imperial gallons or 1,585 US gal); these tanks were located forwards of the pilot and co-pilot positions. Each tank was supported by a duralumin structure and connected to bracing wires at its base; their weight was only three percent of that of a full fuel loadout. A sleeping couch was fitted behind the co-pilot's station so one of the crew members could sleep on long-distance flights. The undercarriage, which was streamlined, was furnished with shock-absorbing struts, which comprised telescoping tubes that were interconnected via crosspieces that bore elastic cables. The tail unit featured a fin that was formed from a continuation of upright members of the fuselage; its leading edge was covered with plywood while its trailing edge had a fabric covering. The rear spar of the stabilizer and the front spar of the elevator were hinged to a central piece. The stabilizer could be adjusted mid-flight.

It was powered by a single Hispano-Suiza 12L piston engine that directly drove the aircraft's propeller; Blériot decided against the use of reduction gear due to the suboptimal gearing available for an aircraft intended for such flights. The powerplant was carried upon an engine hearer that was composed of duralumin and incorporated relatively cutting edge principles. Separate elements were present to withstand the forces of gravity and traction, and torque; both gravity and traction were absorbed by a rigid triangularly-braced hinged girder while torque was absorbed by the duralumin covering, which was riveted to multiple girders without undermining the elasticity or the stress-absorption properties, of the hinged element. The forward bulkhead was a metal frame to which the stresses were communicated at five points, four in the plane of the engine-bearer longerons while the final was at the point of attachment to the keel; these stresses were transmitted to the bulkhead situated in the vicinity of the forward wing spar.

== Operational history ==
On 16 May 1930, the aircraft conducted its maiden flight; however, this was cut short by a fuel supply issue, although no damage was sustained. Following repairs, it was transported to Oran, Algeria, where it made an attempt on the closed-circuit distance record. Between 15 November and 26 March 1932, the Blériot 110, flown by Lucien Bossoutrot and Maurice Rossi, broke this record three times; on the final occasion staying aloft for 76 hours and 34 minutes and covering a distance of 10,601 km (6,587 mi). By this time, the aircraft had been named Joseph Le Brix in honour of the pilot who had died flying the Blériot 110's principal rival, the Dewoitine D.33.

On 5 August 1933, Paul Codos and Maurice Rossi set a new straight-line distance record, flying from New York to Rayak, Lebanon – a distance of 9,105 km (5,658 mi). Further records were attempted over the next two years, but these were proved unsuccessful, and the 110 was scrapped.

== Specifications ==
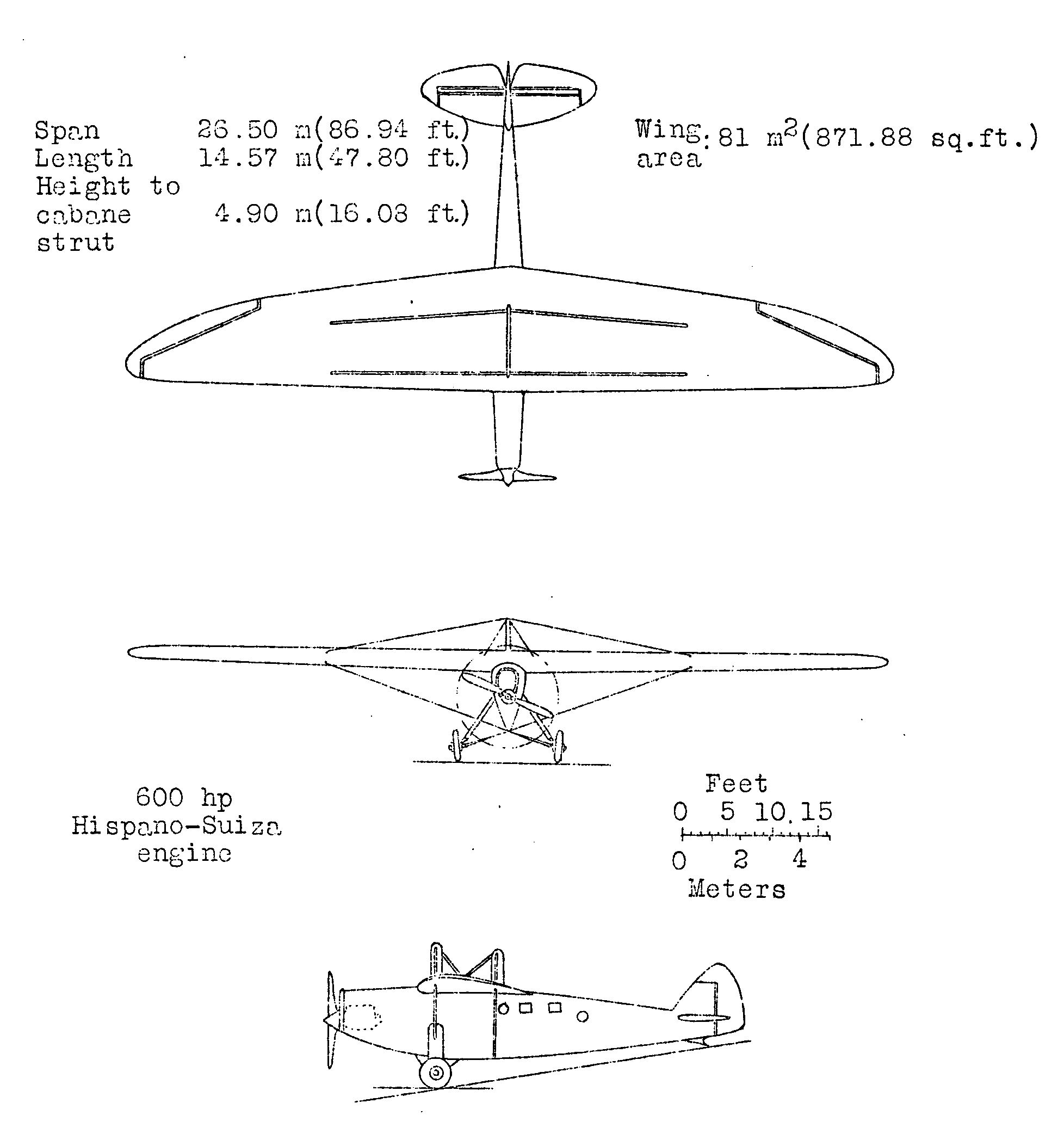
Bleriot 110 3-view drawing from NACA Aircraft Circular No.138

Data from National Advisory Committee for Aeronautics

General characteristics

- Crew: two (pilots)
- Length: 14.57 m (47 ft 9 in)
- Wingspan: 26.50 m (86 ft 11 in)
- Height: 4.90 m (16 ft 1 in)
- Wing area: 81.0 m^{2} (872 sq ft)
- Empty weight: 2,680 kg (5,808 lb)
- Gross weight: 8,790 kg (19,378 lb)
- Powerplant: 1 × Hispano-Suiza 12L , 447 kW (600 hp)

Performance

- Maximum speed: 220 km/h (137 mph, 119 kn)
- Range: 12,600 km (7,830 mi, 6,800 nmi)
- Service ceiling: 2,000 m (6,560 ft)

== See also ==
Aircraft of comparable role, configuration, and era

- Fairey Long-range Monoplane
- Tupolev ANT-25
- Gasuden Koken
