= 1940 =

1940 in various calendars
- Gregorian calendar: 1940; MCMXL
- Ab urbe condita: 2693
- Armenian calendar: 1389; ԹՎ ՌՅՁԹ
- Assyrian calendar: 6690
- Baháʼí calendar: 96–97
- Balinese saka calendar: 1861–1862
- Bengali calendar: 1346–1347
- Berber calendar: 2890
- British Regnal year: 4 Geo. 6 – 5 Geo. 6
- Buddhist calendar: 2484
- Burmese calendar: 1302
- Byzantine calendar: 7448–7449
- Chinese calendar: 己卯年 (Earth Rabbit); 4637 or 4430 — to — 庚辰年 (Metal Dragon); 4638 or 4431
- Coptic calendar: 1656–1657
- Discordian calendar: 3106
- Ethiopian calendar: 1932–1933
- Hebrew calendar: 5700–5701
- Hindu calendars
- Vikram Samvat: 1996–1997
- Shaka Samvat: 1861–1862
- Kali Yuga: 5040–5041
- Holocene calendar: 11940
- Igbo calendar: 940–941
- Iranian calendar: 1318–1319
- Islamic calendar: 1358–1359
- Japanese calendar: Shōwa 15 (昭和１５年)
- Javanese calendar: 1870–1871
- Juche calendar: 29
- Julian calendar: Gregorian minus 13 days
- Korean calendar: 4273
- Minguo calendar: ROC 29 民國29年
- Nanakshahi calendar: 472
- Thai solar calendar: 2482–2483
- Tibetan calendar: ས་མོ་ཡོས་ལོ་ (female Earth-Hare); 2066 or 1685 or 913 — to — ལྕགས་ཕོ་འབྲུག་ལོ་ (male Iron-Dragon); 2067 or 1686 or 914

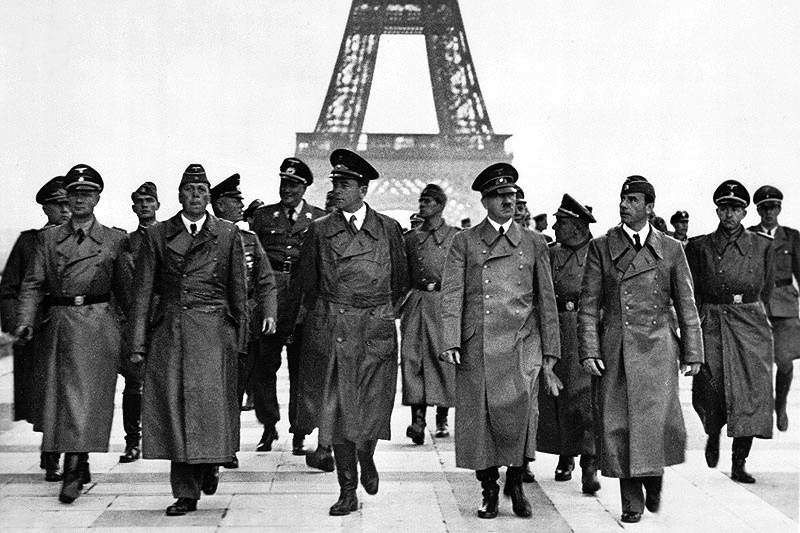
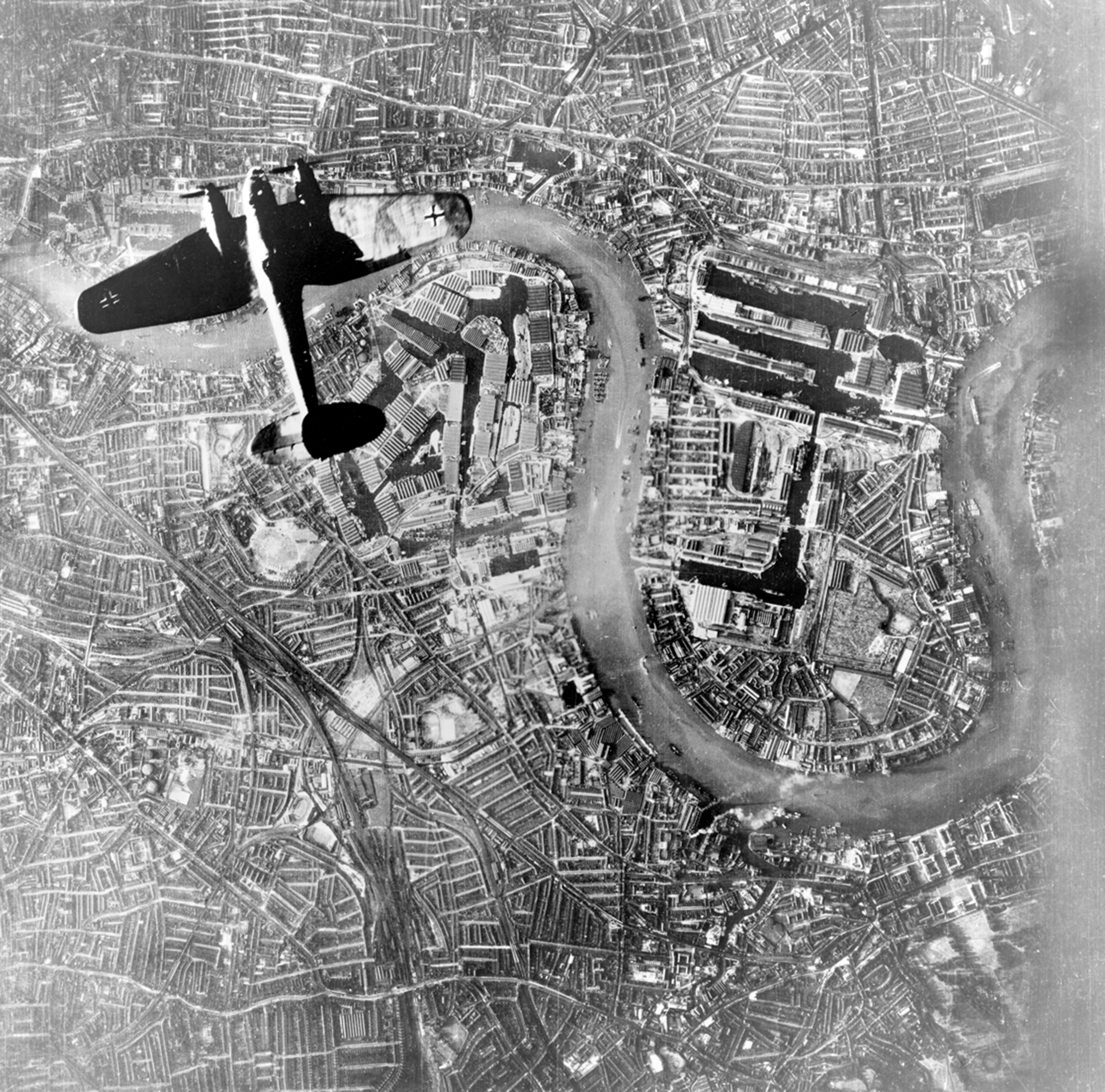
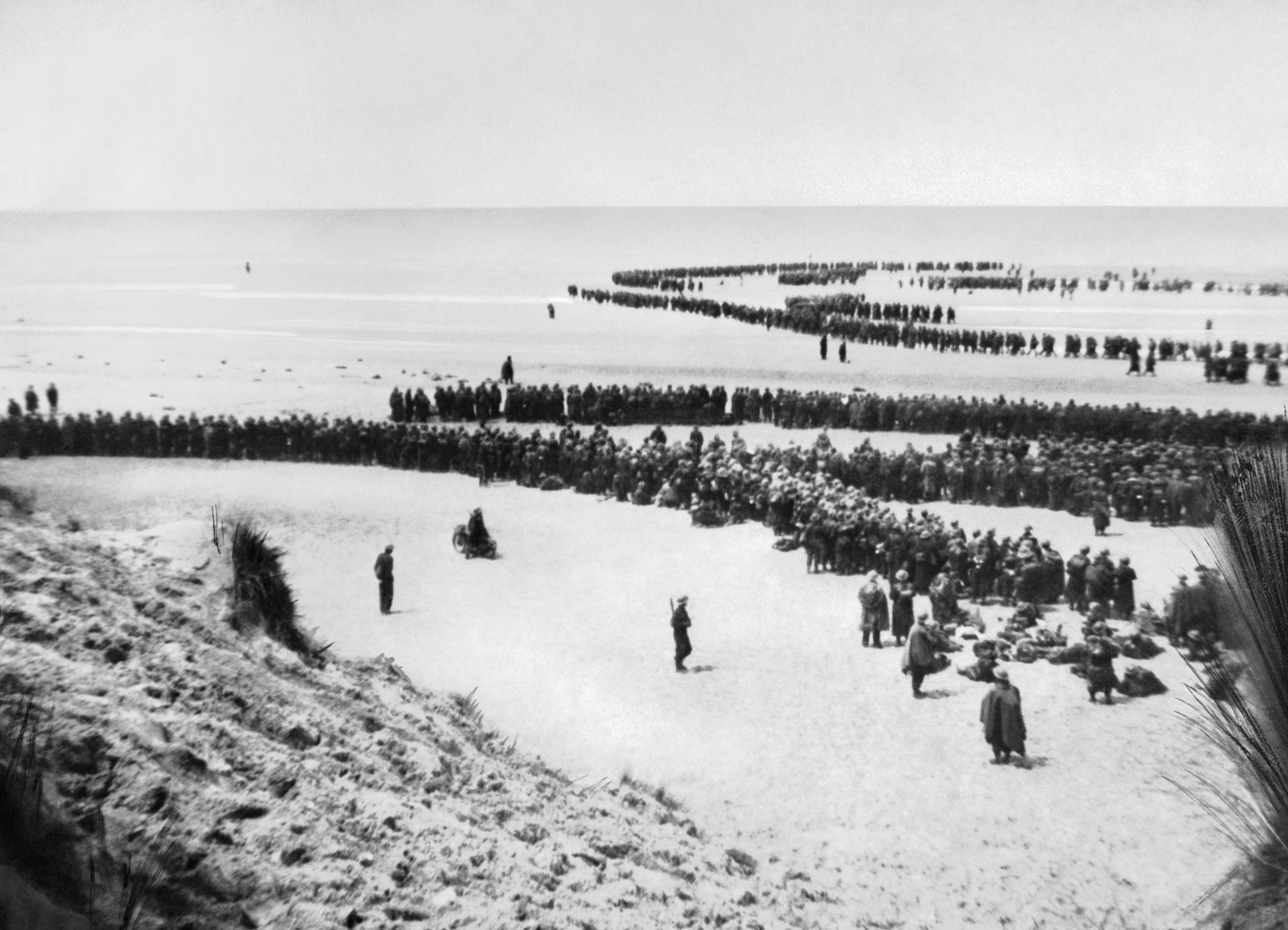
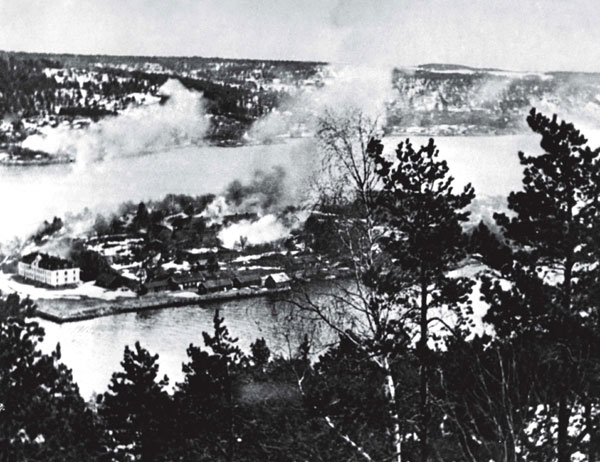
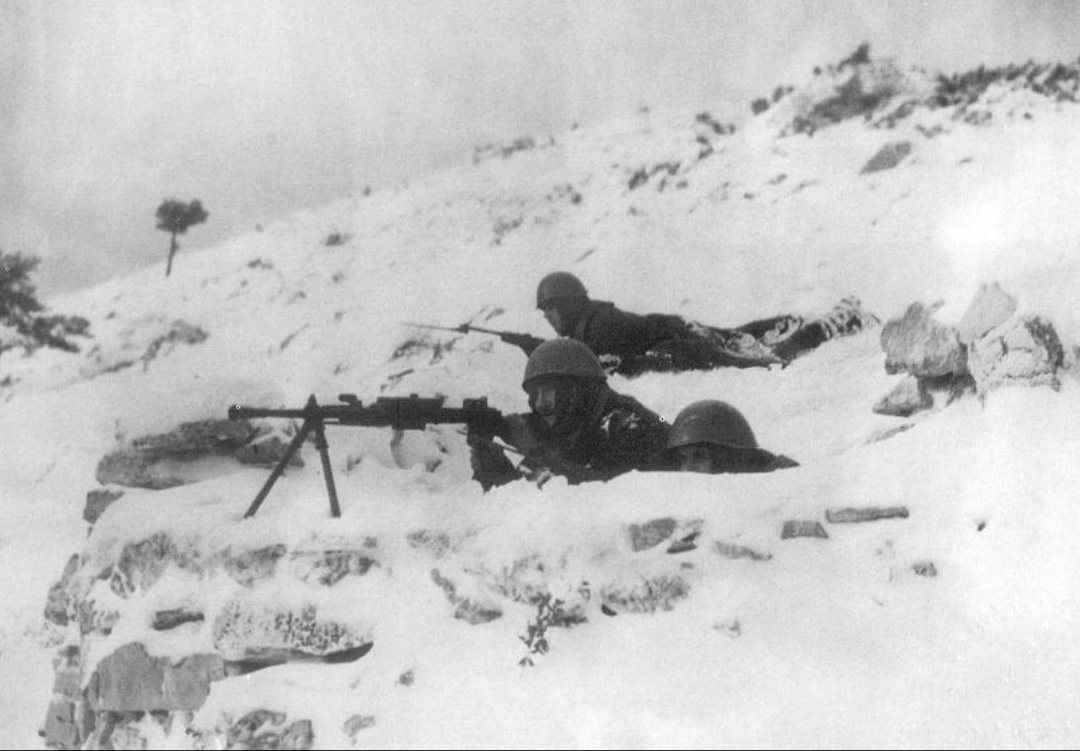
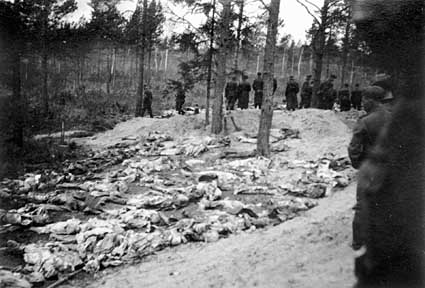
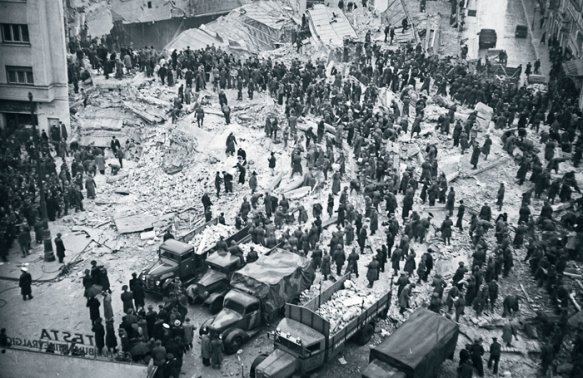
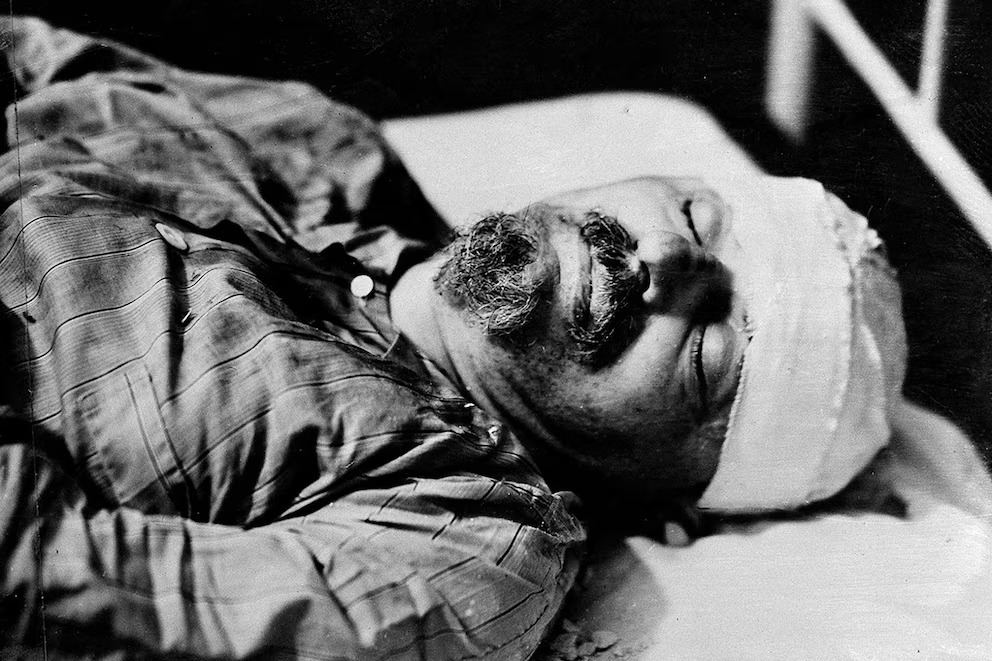
From top to bottom, left to right:
- Nazi Germany conquers France in the Battle of France;
- The United Kingdom endures the Battle of Britain and The Blitz;
- The Dunkirk evacuation saves trapped Allied troops;
- Germany occupies Denmark and Norway in Operation Weserübung;
- Italy’s invasion of Greece sparks the Greco-Italian War;
- The Soviets carry out the Katyn massacre;
- The Tripartite Pact forms the Axis alliance;
- The 1940 Vrancea earthquake strikes Romania;
- Leon Trotsky is assassinated in Mexico.

1940 (MCMXL) was a leap year starting on Monday of the Gregorian calendar, the 1940th year of the Common Era (CE) and Anno Domini (AD) designations, the 940th year of the 2nd millennium, the 40th year of the 20th century, and the 1st year of the 1940s decade.

A calendar from 1940 according to the Gregorian calendar, factoring in the dates of Easter and related holidays, cannot be used again until 5280.

== Events ==
Below, events related to World War II have the "WWII" prefix.

=== January ===
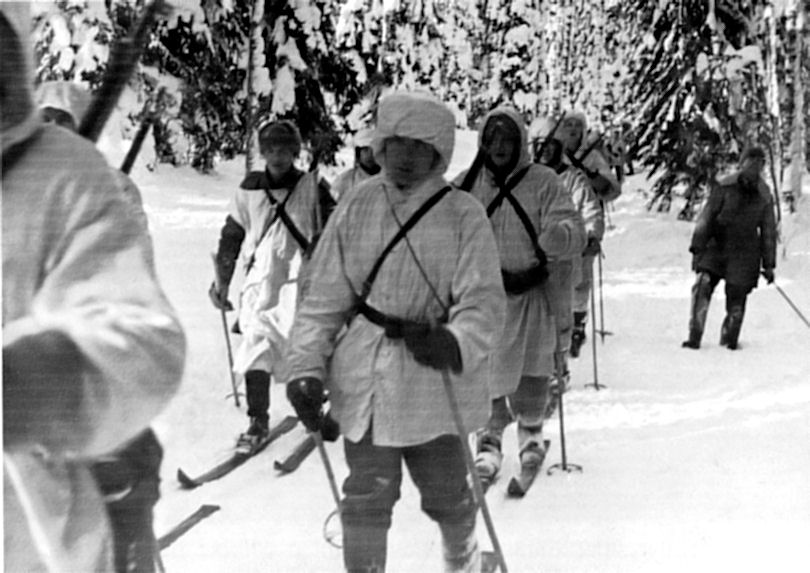
Finnish soldiers in the Winter War

- January 4 – WWII: Luftwaffe Chief and Generalfeldmarschall Hermann Göring assumes control of most war industries in Germany, in his capacity as Plenipotentiary for the Four Year Plan.
- January 6 – WWII: Winter War – General Semyon Timoshenko takes command of all Soviet forces.
- January 7 – WWII: Winter War: Battle of Raate Road – Outnumbered Finnish troops decisively defeat Soviet forces.
- January 8 – WWII:
  - Winter War: Battle of Suomussalmi – Finnish forces destroy the Soviet 44th Rifle Division.
  - Food rationing in the United Kingdom begins; it will remain in force until 1954.
- January 9 – WWII: British submarine HMS Starfish is sunk in the Heligoland Bight.
- January 10 – WWII: Mechelen incident – A German plane carrying secret plans for the invasion of Western Europe makes a forced landing in Belgium, leading to mobilization of defense forces in the Low Countries.
- January 19 – The Three Stooges' You Nazty Spy!, the first Hollywood anti-Nazi comedy film, is released.
- January 27 – WWII: A peace resolution introduced in the Parliament of South Africa is defeated 81–59.
- January 29 – Three gasoline-powered trains carrying factory workers crash and explode while approaching Ajikawaguchi Station, Yumesaki Line (Nishinari Line), Osaka, Japan, killing at least 181 people and injuring at least 92.

=== February ===
- February 2–11 – Scheduled dates for the 1940 Winter Olympics in Garmisch-Partenkirchen, Germany, cancelled in November 1939 due to WWII (originally allocated to Sapporo, Japan).
- February 1 – WWII: Winter War – Soviet forces launch a major assault on Finnish troops occupying the Karelian Isthmus.
- February 15 – Paul Creston's Saxophone Sonata is officially premiered at the Carnegie Chamber Hall by saxophonist Cecil Leeson, who had commissioned it from the composer.
- February 16 – WWII: Altmark incident – British destroyer HMS Cossack pursues German tanker Altmark into the neutral waters of the Jøssingfjorden in southwestern Norway and frees the 290 British seamen held aboard.
- February 22 – In Tibet, province of Ando, 4-year-old Tenzin Gyatso is proclaimed the tulku (rebirth) of the 13th Dalai Lama.
- February 27 – The radioactive isotope carbon-14 is discovered by Martin Kamen and Sam Ruben at the University of California, Berkeley.
- February – The last mounted charge by a British cavalry regiment is made when the Royal Scots Greys are called to quell Arab rioters in Mandatory Palestine.

=== March ===
- March 5 – Katyn massacre: Members of the Soviet Politburo (Joseph Stalin, Vyacheslav Molotov, Lazar Kaganovich, Mikhail Kalinin, Kliment Voroshilov and Lavrentiy Beria) sign an order, prepared by Beria, for the execution of 25,700 Polish intelligentsia, including 14,700 Polish POWs.
- March 11 – Ed Ricketts, John Steinbeck and six others leave Monterey, California, United States, for the Gulf of California, on a marine invertebrate collecting expedition.
- March 12 – Moscow Peace Treaty: The Soviet Union and Finland sign a peace treaty in Moscow, ending the Winter War; Finns, along with the world at large, are shocked by the harsh terms.
- March 13 – Indian nationalist Udham Singh assassinates Sir Michael O'Dwyer (in revenge for the 1919 Jallianwala Bagh massacre) at Caxton Hall in London, for which he is hanged on 31 July at HM Prison Pentonville.
- March 18 – WWII: Axis powers – Adolf Hitler and Benito Mussolini meet at Brenner Pass in the Alps. After being informed by Hitler that the Germans are ready to attack in the west, Mussolini agrees to bring Italy into the war in due course.
- March 21 – Édouard Daladier resigns as Prime Minister of France; Paul Reynaud succeeds him.
- March 23 – Pakistan Movement: The Lahore Resolution, calling for greater autonomy for what will become Pakistan in British India, is drawn up by the All-India Muslim League during a three-day general session at Iqbal Park, Lahore.
- March 30 – WWII: Former Kuomintang member and Chinese foreign minister, Wang Jingwei, announces the creation of the Reorganized National Government of the Republic of China in Nanjing.
- March 31 – WWII: Commerce raiding German auxiliary cruiser Atlantis leaves the Wadden Sea for what will become the longest warship cruise of the war (622 days without in-port replenishment or repair).

=== April ===
- April 3 – WWII: Operation Weserübung – German ships set out for the invasion of Norway.
- April 4 – Neville Chamberlain, UK Prime Minister, in what proves to be a tragic misjudgment, declares in a major public speech that Hitler has "missed the bus".
- April 7 – Booker T. Washington becomes the first African American to be depicted on a United States postage stamp.
- April 8 – WWII: Operation Wilfred: The British fleet lays naval mines off the coast of neutral Norway.
- April 9 – WWII: Germany invades the neutral countries of Denmark and Norway in Operation Weserübung, opening the Norwegian campaign. The British Royal Navy attempts to attack elements of the German fleet off Norway. Vidkun Quisling proclaims a new collaborationist regime in Norway. The German invasion of Denmark lasts for about six hours, before that country capitulates.
- April 10 – WWII: First naval Battle of Narvik – The British Royal Navy attacks the German fleet in the Ofotfjord. At Bergen, German cruiser Königsberg is sunk by British Fleet Air Arm Blackburn Skua dive bombers, flying from RNAS Hatston in Orkney.
- April 12
  - The Faroe Islands are occupied by British troops, following the German invasion of Denmark. This action is taken to avert a possible German occupation of the islands, with serious consequences for the course of the Battle of the Atlantic.
  - Opening day at Jamaica Race Course features the use of parimutuel betting equipment, a departure from bookmaking heretofore used exclusively throughout New York. Other tracks in the state follow suit later in 1940.
- April 13 – WWII: Second naval Battle of Narvik – The British Royal Navy sinks all 8 defending German destroyers in the Ofotfjord.
- April 14 – WWII: Norwegian campaign – The first British ground forces land in Norway, at Namsos and Harstad.
- April 23 – The Rhythm Club fire at a dance hall in Natchez, Mississippi, United States, kills 198 people.
- April 27 – Mandatory Palestine and Lebanon play an association football friendly; it is Lebanon's first official match, and Mandatory Palestine's last before they become Israel in 1948.

=== May ===
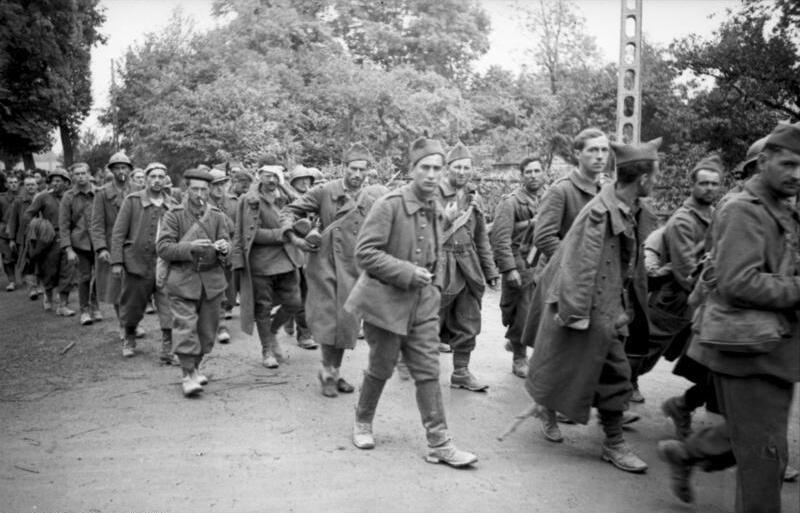
French prisoners of war being marched away from the front, May 1940

- May 10 – WWII:
  - The Battle of France begins.
  - German forces invade the Low Countries:
    - The Battle of the Netherlands begins.
    - The Battle of Belgium begins.
    - The Invasion of Luxembourg begins.
  - The British invasion of Iceland begins.
  - With the resignation of Neville Chamberlain, Winston Churchill becomes Prime Minister of the United Kingdom.
- May 13 – WWII:
  - Winston Churchill, in his first address as Prime Minister, tells the House of Commons of the United Kingdom, "I have nothing to offer you but blood, toil, tears and sweat."
  - German armies open a 60-mile (97 km) wide breach in the Maginot Line at Sedan, France.
- May 13–14 – Queen Wilhelmina of the Netherlands and her government are evacuated to London, using the British destroyer HMS Hereward.
- May 14 – WWII:
  - Rotterdam is subjected to savage terror bombing by the Luftwaffe; 980 are killed, and 20,000 buildings destroyed. General Henri Winkelman announces the surrender of the Dutch army (outside Zeeland) to German forces.
  - Recruitment begins in Britain for a volunteer home defence force: the Local Defence Volunteers, later known as the Home Guard.
- May 15
  - WWII: The Dutch Army formally signs a surrender document.
  - Women's stockings made of nylon are first placed on sale across the United States. Almost five million pairs are bought on this day.
- May 16 – President of the United States Franklin D. Roosevelt, addressing a joint session of the U.S. Congress, asks for an extraordinary credit of approximately $900,000,000 to finance construction of at least 50,000 airplanes per year.
- May 17 – WWII:
  - Brussels falls to German forces; the Belgian government flees to Ostend.
  - Zeeland is overrun by German forces, ending the Battle of the Netherlands and beginning full German occupation of the Netherlands (Noord-Beveland surrenders on May 18, and the remaining Dutch troops are withdrawn from Zeelandic Flanders on May 19).
- May 18 – Marshal Philippe Pétain is named vice-premier of France.
- May 19 – General Maxime Weygand replaces Maurice Gamelin as commander-in-chief of all French forces.
- May 20
  - WWII: German forces (2nd Panzer Division), under General Rudolf Veiel, reach Noyelles on the English Channel.
  - The Holocaust: The Nazi concentration camp and extermination camp Auschwitz-Birkenau, the largest of the German concentration camps, opens in occupied Poland, near the town of Oświęcim. From now on until January 1945, around 1.1 million people will be killed here.
- May 22 – WWII: The Parliament of the United Kingdom passes the Emergency Powers (Defence) Act 1940, giving the government full control over all persons and property.
- May 24 – WWII:
  - The Anglo-French Supreme War Council decides to withdraw all forces under its control from Norway.
  - Hitler issues Der Halte Befehl, a stop order preventing his Panzer divisions advancing on Dunkirk.
- May 25 – The Crypt of Civilization time capsule at Oglethorpe University, Brookhaven, Georgia in the United States, is sealed shut, with a projected opening date of 8113 CE.
- May 26
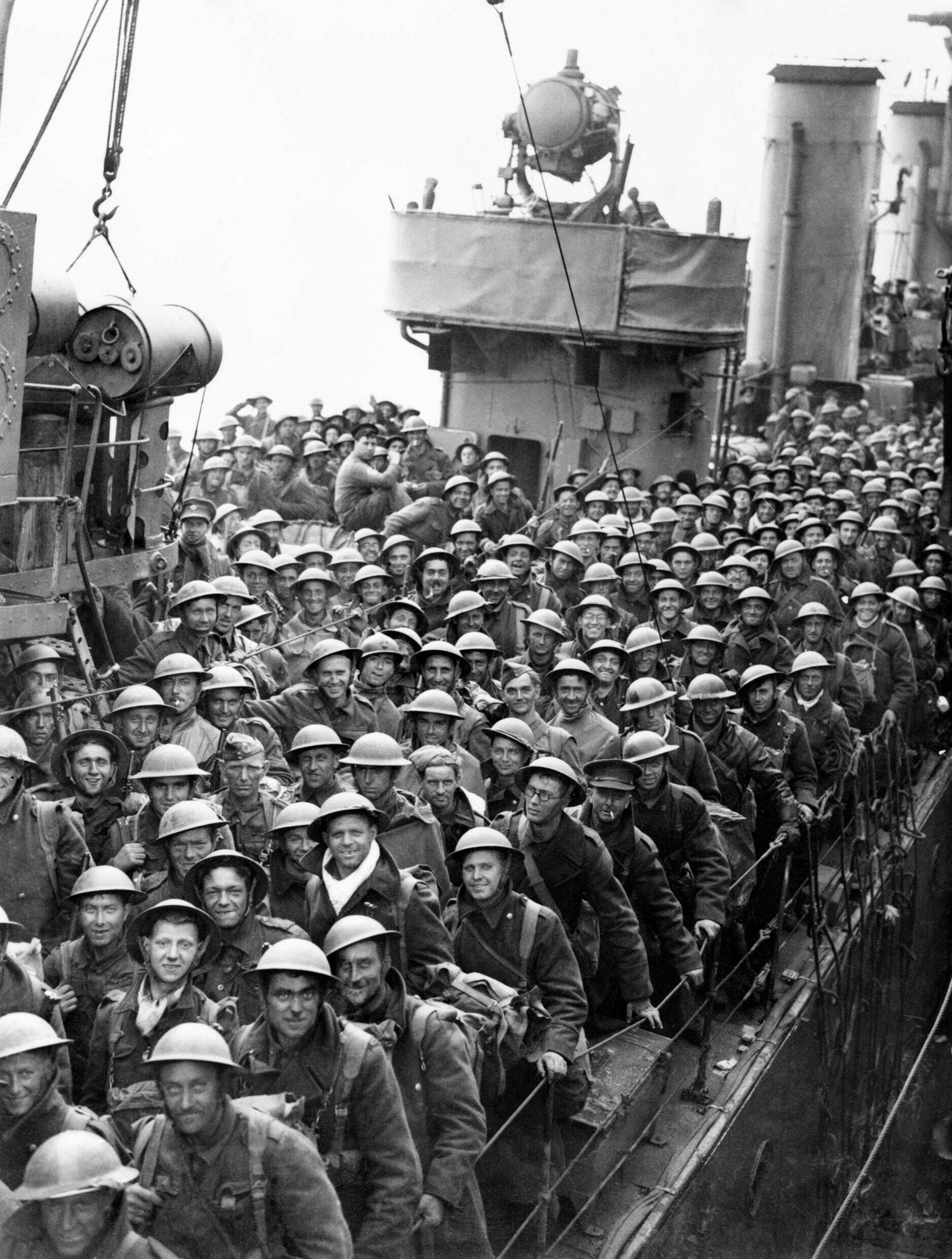
  British troops evacuated from Dunkirk arrive at Dover, May 1940
  - WWII: The Dunkirk evacuation of the British Expeditionary Force from France begins.
  - The first free flight of Igor Sikorsky's Vought-Sikorsky VS-300 helicopter is made in the United States.
- May 27 – WWII: Le Paradis massacre: 97 retreating British soldiers of the Royal Norfolk Regiment are executed by German troops of 3rd SS Panzer Division Totenkopf after surrendering in France.
- May 28 – WWII:
  - (04:00) Surrender of Belgian forces on the orders of King Leopold III, ending the 18-day Battle of Belgium. Leaders of the Belgian government in exile (on French territory at this time) declare Leopold's action to be unconstitutional; he is placed under house arrest by the German occupiers.
  - Land battle of Narvik: German forces retire, giving the Allies their first victory on land in the war; however, the British have already decided to evacuate Narvik.
  - Winston Churchill warns the House of Commons of the United Kingdom to "prepare itself for hard and heavy tidings."
  - The Wormhoudt massacre (or Wormhout massacre) takes place with the mass murder of 80 British and French POWs by Waffen-SS soldiers from the 1st SS Division Leibstandarte SS Adolf Hitler during the Battle of France.

=== June ===
- June 1 – WWII: Rear Admiral Sir W. Frederic Wake-Walker's flagship, the destroyer Keith, is sunk by Stukas at Dunkirk.
- June 3
  - WWII: Paris is bombed by the Luftwaffe for the first time.
  - The Holocaust: Franz Rademacher proposes the Madagascar Plan.
  - The Weather Bureau is transferred to the United States Department of Commerce.
- June 4 – WWII:
  - The Dunkirk evacuation ends: The British and French navies, together with large numbers of civilian vessels from various nations, complete evacuating 300,000 troops from Dunkirk, France to England.
  - Winston Churchill tells the House of Commons of the United Kingdom, "We shall not flag or fail. We shall fight on the beaches... on the landing grounds... in the fields and the streets.... We shall never surrender."
- June 7 – King Haakon VII of Norway and his government are evacuated from Tromsø to London, on HMS Devonshire.
- June 10 – WWII:
  - Italy declares war on France and the United Kingdom.
  - U.S. President Franklin D. Roosevelt denounces Italy's actions with his "Stab in the Back" speech during the graduation ceremonies of the University of Virginia.
  - Canada declares war on Italy.
  - The Norwegian Army surrenders to German forces.
  - The French government flees to Tours.
- June 11 – WWII: The Western Desert Campaign opens, with British forces crossing the Frontier Wire into Italian Libya.
- June 12 – WWII: 13,000 British and French troops surrender to Major-General Erwin Rommel's 7th Panzer Division, at Saint-Valery-en-Caux.
- June 13 – WWII: Paris is declared an open city.
- June 14 – WWII:
  - The French government flees to Bordeaux, and Paris falls under German occupation.
  - U.S. President Franklin D. Roosevelt signs the Naval Expansion Act into law, which aims to increase the United States Navy's tonnage by 11%.
  - A group of 728 Polish political prisoners from Tarnów become the first residents of the Auschwitz concentration camp.
  - Soviet ultimatum to Lithuania: The Soviet Union demands that its Red Army be allowed to enter Lithuania and form a pro-Soviet puppet "People's Government of Lithuania".
- June 15 – WWII:
  - Occupation of the Baltic states: The Soviet Union occupies Lithuania.
  - Verdun falls to German forces.
- June 16
  - The Churchill war ministry in the United Kingdom offers a Franco-British Union (inspired by Jean Monnet) to Paul Reynaud, Prime Minister of France, in the hope of preventing France from agreeing to an armistice with Germany, but Reynaud resigns when his own cabinet refuses to accept it.
  - The Sturgis Motorcycle Rally is held for the first time, in Sturgis, South Dakota.
- June 17 – WWII:
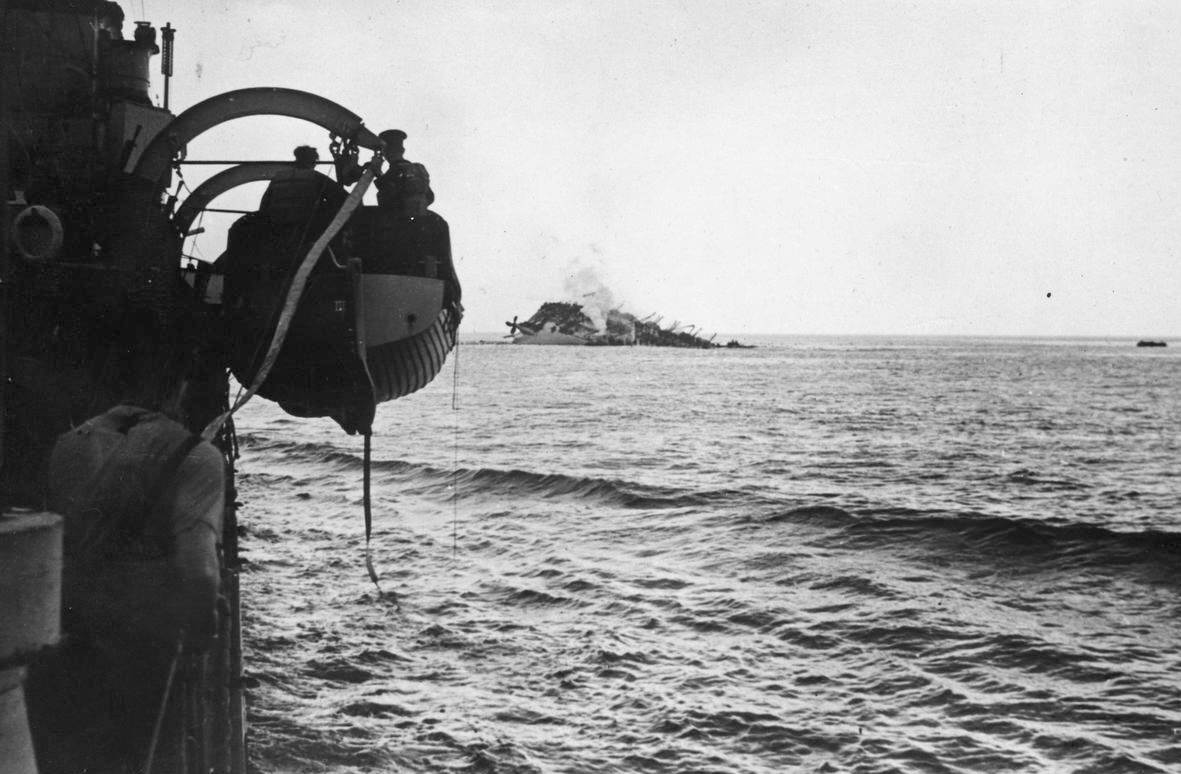
  Lancastria sinking off Saint-Nazaire as seen from a rescue ship
  - Philippe Pétain becomes Prime Minister of France, and immediately asks Germany for peace terms.
  - Occupation of the Baltic states: The Soviet Union occupies Estonia and Latvia.
  - Operation Aerial begins: Allied troops start to evacuate France, following Germany's takeover of Paris and most of the nation.
  - RMS Lancastria, serving as a troopship, is bombed and sunk by Luftwaffe Junkers Ju 88 aircraft, while evacuating British troops and nationals from Saint-Nazaire in France, with the loss of at least 4,000 lives, the largest single UK loss in any World War II event, immediate news of which is suppressed in the British press. Destroyer HMS Beagle (H30) rescues around 600.
- June 18 – WWII:
  - Winston Churchill tells the House of Commons of the United Kingdom: "The Battle of France is over. The Battle of Britain is about to begin... if the British Empire and its Commonwealth last for a thousand years, men will still say, This was their finest hour."
  - Appeal of 18 June: General Charles de Gaulle, de facto leader of the Free French Forces, makes his first broadcast appeal over Radio Londres from London, rallying the French Resistance, calling on all French people to continue the fight against Nazi Germany: "France has lost a battle. But France has not lost the war."
- June 20 – WWII: Evacuation of civilians from the Channel Islands to England begins.
- June 21 – WWII: The unsuccessful Italian invasion of France begins with an offensive in the Alps.
- June 22
  - WWII: Second Armistice at Compiègne: The French Third Republic and Nazi Germany sign an armistice, ending the Battle of France in the Forest of Compiègne, in the same Compagnie Internationale des Wagons-Lits railroad car used by Marshal Ferdinand Foch to conclude the Armistice with Germany in 1918. This divides France into a Zone occupée in the north and west, under the Military Administration in France (Nazi Germany), and a southern Zone libre, Vichy France.
  - Albert Einstein gives a public address in the "I'm An American" series, on becoming an American citizen.
- June 23 – WWII: German leader Adolf Hitler surveys newly defeated Paris, in now-occupied France.
- June 24
  - WWII: Vichy France signs armistice terms with Italy.
  - WWII: Operation Fish – British Royal Navy cruiser HMS Emerald sails from Greenock (Scotland) in convoy for Halifax, Nova Scotia (arriving July 1), carrying a large part of the gold reserves of the United Kingdom and securities for safe keeping in Canada.
  - United States politics: The Republican Party begins its national convention in Philadelphia, and nominates Wendell Willkie as its candidate for president.
- June 25 – WWII: After the defeat of France, Hitler plans for an invasion of Switzerland, known as Operation Tannenbaum.
- June 26 – Soviet calendar: The Soviet Union reverts to a seven-day week for all purposes.
- June 28
  - General Charles de Gaulle is officially recognized by Britain as the "Leader of all Free Frenchmen, wherever they may be."
  - Romania cedes Bessarabia and northern Bukovina to the Soviet Union, after an ultimatum.
  - The Smith Act (Alien Registration Act) is signed into United States law, setting criminal penalties for advocating overthrow of the government by force or violence, and requiring all aliens in the U.S. to register with the federal government.
- June 30
  - WWII: German forces land in Guernsey, marking the start of the 5-year Occupation of the Channel Islands.
  - Federal government of the United States reorganisation:
    - The Civil Aeronautics Administration is placed under the Department of Commerce.
    - The U.S. Food and Drug Administration is placed under the Federal Security Agency.
    - The United States Fish and Wildlife Service is placed under the Department of the Interior.

=== July ===
- July 1 – The first Tacoma Narrows Bridge opens for business, built with an 8-foot (2.4 m) girder and 190 feet (58 m) above the water, as the third-longest suspension bridge in the world.
- July 2 – WWII: British-owned SS Arandora Star, carrying civilian internees and POWs of Italian and German origin from Liverpool to Canada, is torpedoed and sunk by German submarine U-47 off northwest Ireland, with the loss of around 865 lives.
- July 3 – WWII: Attack on Mers-el-Kébir: British naval units sink or seize ships of the French fleet anchored in the Algerian ports of Mers-el-Kebir and Oran, to prevent them from falling into German hands. The following day, Vichy France breaks off diplomatic relations with Britain.
- July 5 – WWII: Operation Fish – A British convoy including HMS Batory sails from Greenock (Scotland) for Halifax, Nova Scotia, carrying gold bar and other valuables worth $1.7 billion for safe keeping in Canada, the largest movement of wealth in history.
- July 6
  - Story Bridge opens in Brisbane.
  - WWII: British submarine HMS Shark is sunk.
- July 10 – WWII: The Battle of Britain air offensive of the German Luftwaffe against the British RAF Fighter Command begins.
- July 11 – WWII:
  - British destroyer HMS Escort is torpedoed and sunk by an Italian submarine.
  - Vichy France begins with a constitutional law which only eighty members of the parliament vote against. Philippe Pétain becomes Prime Minister of France.
- July 14 – WWII: Winston Churchill, in a worldwide broadcast, proclaims the intention of Great Britain to fight alone against Germany whatever the outcome: "We shall seek no terms. We shall tolerate no parley. We may show mercy. We shall ask none."
- July 15 – U.S. politics: The Democratic Party begins its national convention in Chicago, and nominates Franklin D. Roosevelt for an unprecedented third term as president.
- July 19 – WWII:
  - Battle of Cape Spada: HMAS Sydney and five destroyers sink the Italian cruiser Bartolomeo Colleoni.2
  - Adolf Hitler makes a peace appeal ("appeal to reason") to Britain, in an address to the Reichstag. BBC German-language broadcaster Sefton Delmer unofficially rejects it at once and Lord Halifax, the British foreign minister, flatly rejects peace terms in a broadcast reply on July 22.
- July 20–August 4 – Scheduled dates for the 1940 Summer Olympics in Helsinki, Finland, cancelled in November 1939 due to WWII (originally allocated to Tokyo, Japan).
- July 21 – sAfter rigged parliamentary elections in the three occupied countries on July 14–15, the parliaments proclaim the Estonian, Latvian and Lithuanian Soviet Socialist Republics.
- July 23 – Welles Declaration: United States Under Secretary of State Sumner Welles announces that the U.S. will not accord diplomatic recognition to the Soviet Union's occupation of the Baltic states.
- July 25 – General Henri Guisan addresses the officer corps of the Swiss army at Rütli, resolving to resist any invasion of the country.
- July 27
  - Eleven British nationals, including Melville James Cox, are arrested on suspicion of spying for military intelligence by the secret police in Japan. Cox commits suicide in Tokyo on July 29, according to a report by the Japanese Foreign Ministry.
  - Bugs Bunny makes his debut in the Oscar-nominated cartoon short, A Wild Hare. However, it is not until 1941 that his name is adopted.

=== August ===
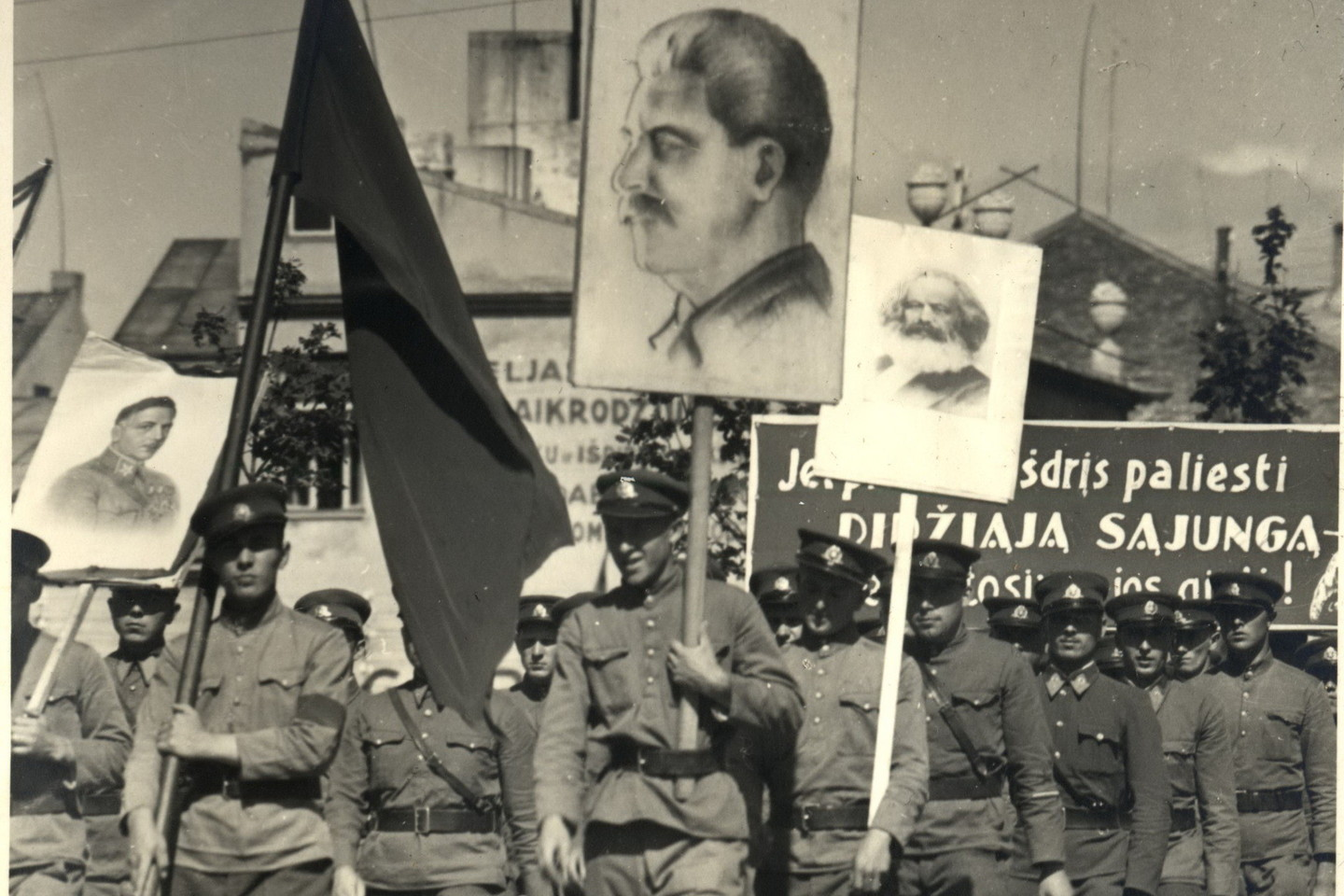
Soldiers of the Lithuanian People's Army carrying the Soviet propaganda posters, August 1940

- August 1 – WWII: British submarine HMS Spearfish is sunk off the coast of Norway
- August 3 – The Lithuanian SSR is annexed into the Soviet Union, followed by the Latvian SSR on August 5 and the Estonian SSR August 6, just seven weeks after their occupation. Ethnic Germans will be deported to Germany.
- August 3–19 – WWII: The Italian conquest of British Somaliland is completed.
- August 4 – U.S. Gen. John J. Pershing, in a nationwide radio broadcast, urges all-out aid to Britain in order to defend the Americas, while Charles Lindbergh speaks to an isolationist rally at Soldier Field in Chicago.
- August 8 – WWII: German general Wilhelm Keitel signs the Aufbau Ost directive, which eventually leads to the invasion of the Soviet Union.
- August 10 – WWII: British armed merchant cruiser HMS Transylvania is torpedoed off Malin Head, Ireland, by German submarine U-56.
- August 13 – WWII: Luftwaffe Adlertag ("Eagle Day") strike on southern England occurs, starting the rapid escalation of the Battle of Britain.
- August 15 – Italy, without having declared war on Greece, sinks the Greek boat Elli (Έλλη).
- August 18
  - WWII: "The Hardest Day" in the Battle of Britain: Both sides lose more aircraft combined on this day than at any other point during the campaign, without the Luftwaffe achieving dominance over RAF Fighter Command.
  - The Prince Edward, Duke of Windsor, is installed as Governor of the Bahamas.
- August 20
  - WWII: Winston Churchill pays tribute in the House of Commons of the United Kingdom to the Royal Air Force fighter pilots: "Never in the field of human conflict was so much owed by so many to so few."
  - Leon Trotsky is attacked with an ice axe in his Mexico home by NKVD agent Ramón Mercader.
- August 24 – Howard Florey and a team including Ernst Chain and Norman Heatley at the Sir William Dunn School of Pathology, University of Oxford, publish their laboratory results showing the in vivo bactericidal action of penicillin. They have also purified the drug.
- August 25 – WWII: The first Bombing of Berlin is carried out, by the British Royal Air Force.
- August 26 – WWII: Chad is the first French colony to proclaim its support for the Allies.
- August 30 – Second Vienna Award: Germany and Italy compel Romania to cede half of Transylvania to Hungary.
- August 31
  - WWII: Texel Disaster: Two British Royal Navy destroyers are sunk by running into a minefield off the coast of the occupied Netherlands with the loss of around 400 men, 300 of them dead.
  - British film stars Laurence Olivier and Vivien Leigh are married at the San Ysidro Ranch in California.

=== September ===
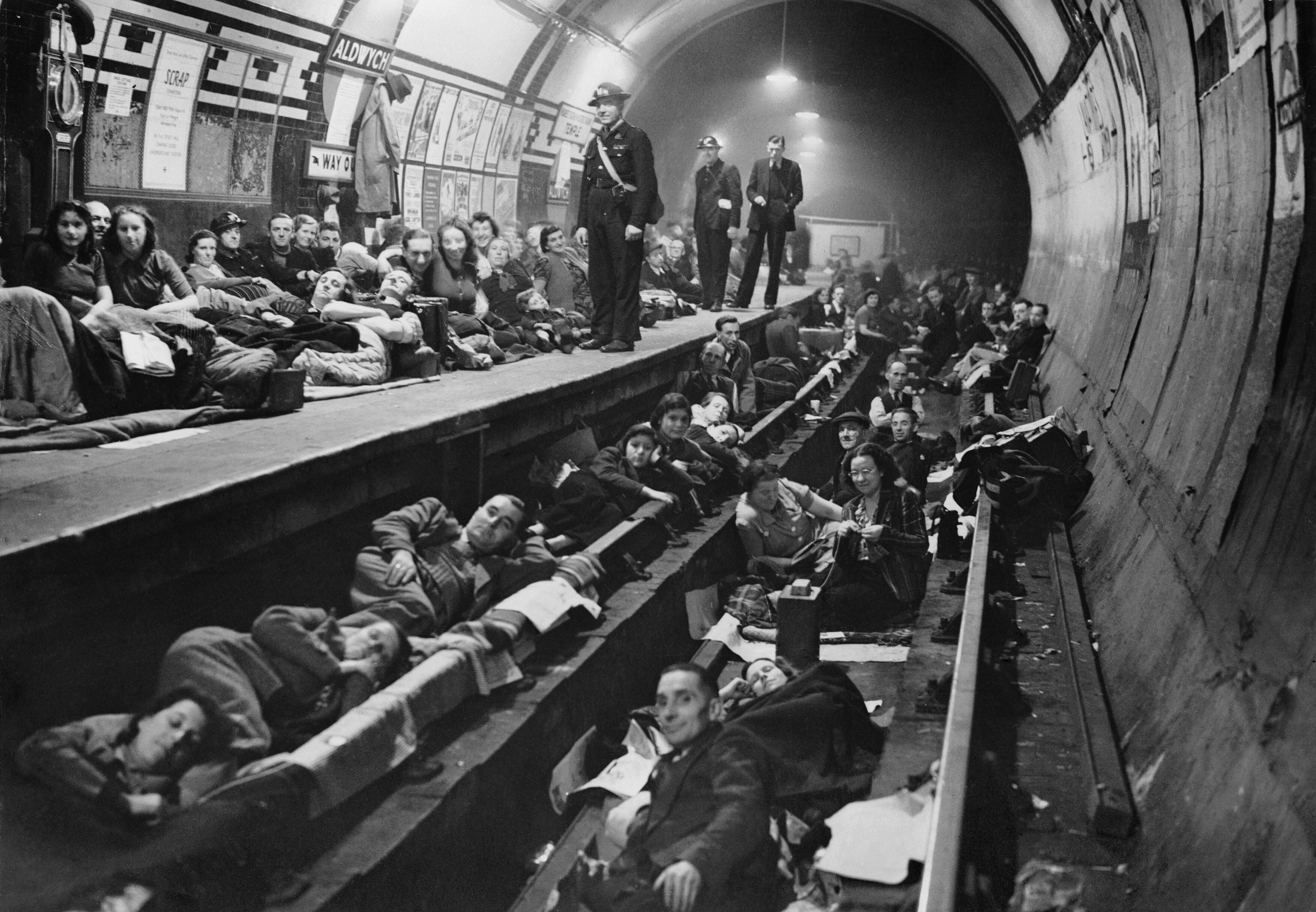
London Underground during the Blitz, 1940

- September – The U.S. Army 45th Infantry Division (previously a National Guard Division in Arizona, Colorado, New Mexico, and Oklahoma), is activated and ordered into federal service for one year, to engage in a training program in Ft. Sill and Louisiana, prior to serving in WWII.
- September 2 – WWII: The Destroyers for Bases Agreement between the United States and Great Britain is announced, to the effect that 50 U.S. destroyers needed for escort work will be transferred to Great Britain. In return, the United States gains 99-year leases on British bases in the North Atlantic, West Indies and Bermuda.
- September 4 – WWII: Adolf Hitler's Winterhilfe speech at the Berlin Sportpalast declares that Nazi Germany will make retaliatory night air raids on British cities and threatens invasion.
- September 5 – WWII: Commerce raiding German auxiliary cruiser Komet enters the Pacific Ocean via the Bering Strait, after crossing the Arctic Ocean from the North Sea, with the help of Soviet icebreakers Lenin, Stalin and Kaganovich.
- September 6 – King Carol II of Romania abdicates and is succeeded by his son Michael.
- September 7
  - The President of Paraguay, José Félix Estigarribia, dies in a plane crash.
  - Treaty of Craiova: Romania loses Southern Dobruja to Bulgaria.
  - WWII: The Blitz – Nazi Germany begins to rain bombs on London (the first of 57 consecutive nights of strategic bombing).
- September 9–16 – WWII: The Italian invasion of Egypt commences from Libya, progressing only as far as Sidi Barrani.
- September 9
  - Treznea massacre: The Hungarian Army, supported by local Hungarians, kill 93 Romanian civilians in Treznea, Sălaj, a village in Northern Transylvania, as part of attempts at ethnic cleansing.
  - George Stibitz first demonstrates the remote operation of a computer, in the United States.
- September 12
  - In Lascaux, France, 17,000-year-old cave paintings are discovered by a group of young Frenchmen hiking through Southern France. The paintings depict animals, and date to the Stone Age.
  - The Hercules Munitions Plant in Succasunna-Kenvil, New Jersey explodes, killing 55 people.
- September 14 – Ip massacre: The Hungarian Army, supported by local Hungarians, kill 158 Romanian civilians in Ip, Sălaj, a village in Northern Transylvania, as part of attempts at ethnic cleansing.
- September 16 – WWII: The Selective Training and Service Act of 1940 is signed into law by Franklin D. Roosevelt, creating the first peacetime draft in U.S. history.
- September 17 – WWII:
  - Hitler postpones Operation Sea Lion (Unternehmen Seelöwe), the planned German invasion of Britain, indefinitely.
  - British planes from HMS Illustrious, backed by battleship HMS Valiant, attack the port of Benghazi in Libya. Four Italian ships are sunk in the harbour.
- September 17–18 – WWII: SS City of Benares is torpedoed by German submarine U-48 in the Atlantic, with the loss of 248 of the 406 on board, including child evacuees bound for Canada. This results in cancellation of the British Children's Overseas Reception Board's plan to relocate children overseas.
- September 20–22 – WWII: Convoy HX 72, a North Atlantic convoy of 43 ships, is attacked by a German U-boat group (wolfpack), eleven ships of 73 tons are sunk, seven during the second night of the attack by the U-100 under the command of Joachim Schepke.
- September 21 – 1940 Australian federal election: Robert Menzies' UAP/Country Coalition Government is re-elected as a minority government, narrowly defeating the Labor Party led by John Curtin. It is the last federal election to result in a minority government until 2010.
- September 22 – French Indochina in World War II: Japan and the colonial Vichy government of French Indochina sign an agreement permitting certain numbers of Japanese troops into the country (with rights for three airfields) to blockade China. There immediately follows a Japanese invasion of French Indochina, in which a group of Japanese officers take Đồng Đăng and Lam Sơn, with 40 Franco-Vietnamese troops killed and around 1,000 deserting. Fighting dies down on September 26.
- September 23–25 – WWII: Battle of Dakar – Naval forces of Free France and Britain fail to take the port of Dakar in French West Africa from Vichy France.
- September 25 – Occupation of Norway by Nazi Germany: German Reichskommissar Josef Terboven appoints a provisional council of state from the pro-Nazi Nasjonal Samling party, under Vidkun Quisling, as a puppet government for Norway.
- September 26 – The U.S. government places an embargo on the exportation of scrap iron and steel to any country outside the Western Hemisphere excluding Britain, effective October 16.
- September 27 – WWII: Germany, Italy and Japan sign the Tripartite Pact.
- September 30 (night to October 1) – Arsonists from the Hitler Youth destroy the Great Synagogue of Strasbourg.

=== October ===
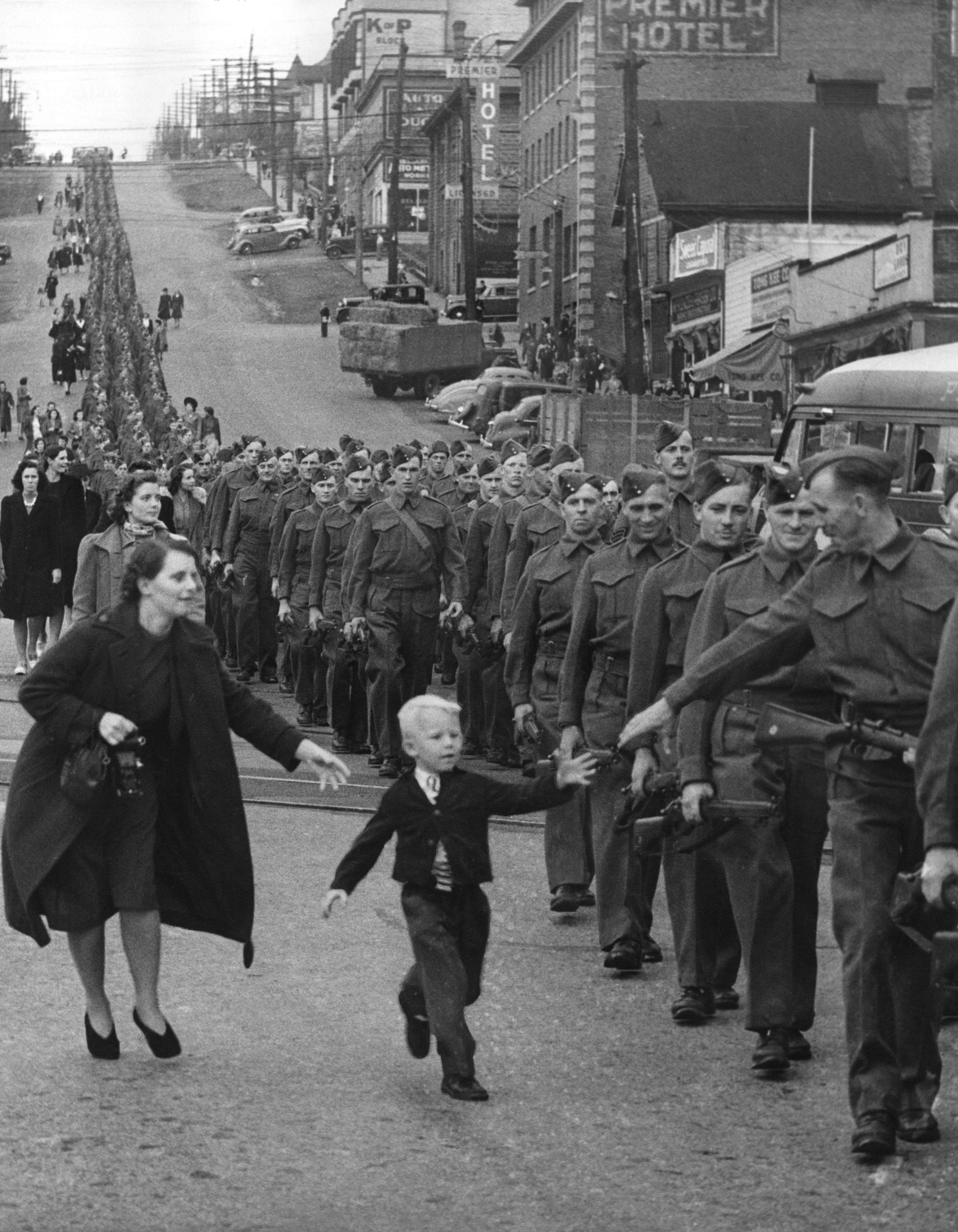
Wait for Me, Daddy, a photo taken by Claude P. Dettloff of the British Columbia Regiment marching in New Westminster, October 1940

- October 1 – The first section of the Pennsylvania Turnpike, the United States' first long-distance controlled-access highway, is opened.
- October 11 – Portuguese-born performer Carmen Miranda makes her American film debut in Down Argentine Way, one of the first films produced to promote the Good Neighbor policy.
- October 14 – WWII: At least 66 people are killed when a Luftwaffe bomb penetrates Balham station on the London Underground which is in use as an air-raid shelter during The Blitz on England.
- October 16
  - The draft registration of approximately 16 million men begins in the United States.
  - Nazi Governor-General Hans Frank establishes the Warsaw Ghetto.
- October 18–19 – WWII: Thirty-two ships are sunk from Convoy SC 7 and Convoy HX 79 by the most effective "wolfpack" of the war, including Otto Kretschmer, Günther Prien and Joachim Schepke.
- October 26–28 – WWII: RMS Empress of Britain, serving as a troopship under the British flag, is bombed, torpedoed and sunk off the Donegal coast, with the loss of 45 lives. At 42,348 GRT, she is the war's largest merchant ship loss.
- October 28 – WWII: Greco-Italian War begins when Italian troops invade Greece, meeting strong resistance from Greek troops and civilians. This action signals the start of the Balkan Campaign.
- October 29 – The Selective Service System lottery is held in Washington, D.C..

=== November ===
- November – In Cambodia, the Khmer Issarak is formed to overthrow the French Army within the country.
- November 2–8 – WWII: Greco-Italian War – Battle of Elaia–Kalamas in Epirus: Outnumbered Greek forces repel the Italian Army.
- November 2 – German submarine U-69 is commissioned, the first Type VIIC U-boat of Nazi Germany's Kriegsmarine, which will become its most numerous class, with 568 commissioned during the War.
- November 5
  - 1940 United States presidential election: Democrat incumbent Franklin D. Roosevelt decisively defeats Republican challenger Wendell Willkie, and becomes the United States' first and only third-term president.
  - WWII: Allied Convoy HX 84 is attacked by German cruiser Admiral Scheer in the North Atlantic; the sacrifice of escorting British armed merchant cruiser HMS Jervis Bay under Capt. Edward Fegen and SS Beaverford enables a majority of the ships (including tanker MV San Demetrio) to escape.
- November 6 – Agatha Christie's mystery novel And Then There Were None is published in book form, in the United States.
- November 7 – In Tacoma, Washington, the 600-foot (180 m)-long center span of the Tacoma Narrows Bridge (known as Galloping Gertie) collapses.
- November 8 – WWII: MS City of Rayville is sunk by a naval mine off Cape Otway, Australia (the first United States Merchant Marine loss of the war).
- November 10 – 1940 Vrancea earthquake: An earthquake in Romania kills 1,000.
- November 11
  - WWII: The British Royal Navy launches the first aircraft carrier strike in history, on the Italian battleship fleet anchored at Taranto Naval Base.
  - WWII: German auxiliary cruiser Atlantis captures top secret British mail intended for the British Far East Command from the SS Automedon, and sends it to Japan.
  - Armistice Day Blizzard: An unexpected blizzard kills 144 in the Midwestern United States.
- November 12 – WWII: The Battle of Gabon, begun on October 27, concludes with Free French Forces taking control of the colony of Gabon and the remainder of French Equatorial Africa from the Vichy regime.
- November 13 – The Walt Disney animated film Fantasia, the first commercial film shown in stereophonic sound, has its world premiere at the Broadway Theatre in New York City. It is the first box office failure for Disney, though it recoups its cost years later and becomes one of the most highly regarded of Disney's films.
- November 14 – WWII: Coventry Blitz – The city centre of Coventry, England is destroyed by 500 Luftwaffe bombers; 150,000 fire bombs, 503 tons of high explosives and 130 parachute mines level 60,000 of the city's 75,000 buildings; 568 people are killed. The city's cathedral is gutted.
- November 15 – Abbott and Costello make their film debut, in One Night in the Tropics.
- November 16
  - WWII: In response to Germany levelling Coventry 2 days before, the Royal Air Force begins to bomb Hamburg (by war's end, 50,000 Hamburg residents will have died from Allied attacks).
  - An unexploded pipe bomb is found in the Consolidated Edison office building (only in 1957 later is the culprit, former employee George Metesky, apprehended).
  - The Jamaica Association of Local Government Officers is founded.
- November 17 – The Tartu Art Museum is established in Tartu, Estonia.
- November 18 – WWII: German leader Adolf Hitler and Italian Foreign Minister Galeazzo Ciano meet to discuss Benito Mussolini's disastrous invasion of Greece.
- November 20–24 – WWII: Hungary, Romania and Slovakia join the Axis powers.
- November 25
  - Patria disaster: As British authorities attempt to deport Jewish refugees (originating from German-occupied Europe) from Mandatory Palestine to Mauritius, aboard the requisitioned emigrant liner SS Patria at Haifa, the Jewish paramilitary organization Haganah sinks the ship with a bomb, killing around 250 refugees and crew.
  - The de Havilland Mosquito and Martin B-26 Marauder military aircraft both make their first flights.
  - Woody Woodpecker makes his debut in the animated short, Knock Knock. It is not until 1941 that his current name is adopted.
- November 26–27 – Jilava Massacre: In Romania, coup leader General Ion Antonescu's Iron Guard arrests and executes over 60 of exiled King Carol II of Romania's aides, starting at a penitentiary near Bucharest. Among the dead is former minister and acclaimed historian Nicolae Iorga.
- November 27 – WWII: Battle of Cape Spartivento: The British Royal Navy and Italian Regia Marina battle to a draw.
- November 30 – The Battle of South Guangxi (Second Sino-Japanese War) concludes after a year with the Japanese retiring having attained their strategic objectives; however, the Central Hubei Operation concludes after five days leaving many Japanese dead.

=== December ===
- December – Timely Comics' Captain America Comics #1 (cover dated March 1941), first appearance of Captain America and Bucky, hits newsstands in the United States.
- December 1 – Manuel Ávila Camacho takes office as President of Mexico.
- December 6 – British submarine HMS Regulus is sunk near Taranto.
- December 8 – The Chicago Bears, in what will become the most one-sided victory in National Football League history, defeat the Washington Redskins 73–0 in the 1940 NFL Championship Game.
- December 9 – WWII: Operation Compass – British forces in North Africa begin their first major offensive, with an attack on Italian forces at Sidi Barrani, Egypt.
- December 12 and December 15 – WWII: Sheffield Blitz ("Operation Crucible") – The Yorkshire steelmaking city of Sheffield in England is badly damaged by German air-raids.
- December 14 – WWII:
  - British destroyers HMS Hereward and HMS Hyperion sink an Italian submarine off Bardia.
  - Royal Navy Fairey Swordfish based on Malta bomb Tripoli.
  - Plutonium is first synthesized in the laboratory, by a team led by Glenn T. Seaborg and Edwin McMillan, at the University of California, Berkeley.
- December 16 – WWII: Operation Abigail Rachel – The RAF bombs Mannheim.
- December 17 – President Roosevelt, at his regular press conference, first sets forth the outline of his plan to send aid to Great Britain, which will become known as Lend-Lease.
- December 23 – WWII: Winston Churchill, in a broadcast address to the people of Italy, blames Benito Mussolini for leading his nation to war against the British, contrary to Italy's historic friendship with them: "One man has arrayed the trustees and inheritors of ancient Rome upon the side of the ferocious pagan barbarians."
- December 24 – Mahatma Gandhi, Indian spiritual non-violence leader, writes his second letter to Adolf Hitler, addressing him as "My friend", and requesting him to stop the war Germany had begun.
- December 25 – The German cruiser Admiral Hipper attacks a British shipping convoy (WS 5A) en route to Sierra Leone 700 miles (1,100 km) west of Cape Finisterre in Spain. Admiral Hipper sinks one ship but has to withdraw with engine trouble.
- December 27 – WWII: German auxiliary cruiser Komet shells and heavily damages the phosphate production facilities on the Pacific island of Nauru (under Australian protection at this time) while flying the Japanese flag. The bombardment lasts an hour and causes the loss of 13,000 tons of oil.
- December 29
  - Franklin D. Roosevelt, in a fireside chat to the nation, declares that the United States must become "the great arsenal of democracy."
  - WWII: "Second Great Fire of London" – The Luftwaffe carries out a massive incendiary bombing raid, starting 1,500 fires. Many famous buildings, including the Guildhall and Trinity House, are either damaged or destroyed.

=== Date unknown ===
- Ansul Fire School is founded in Marinette, Wisconsin.
- In Korea, the Hunminjeongeum (1446) is discovered, explaining the basis of the Hangul alphabet.
- Walter Knott begins construction of a California ghost town replica, which soon evolves into Knott's Berry Farm.

== Births ==
=== January ===
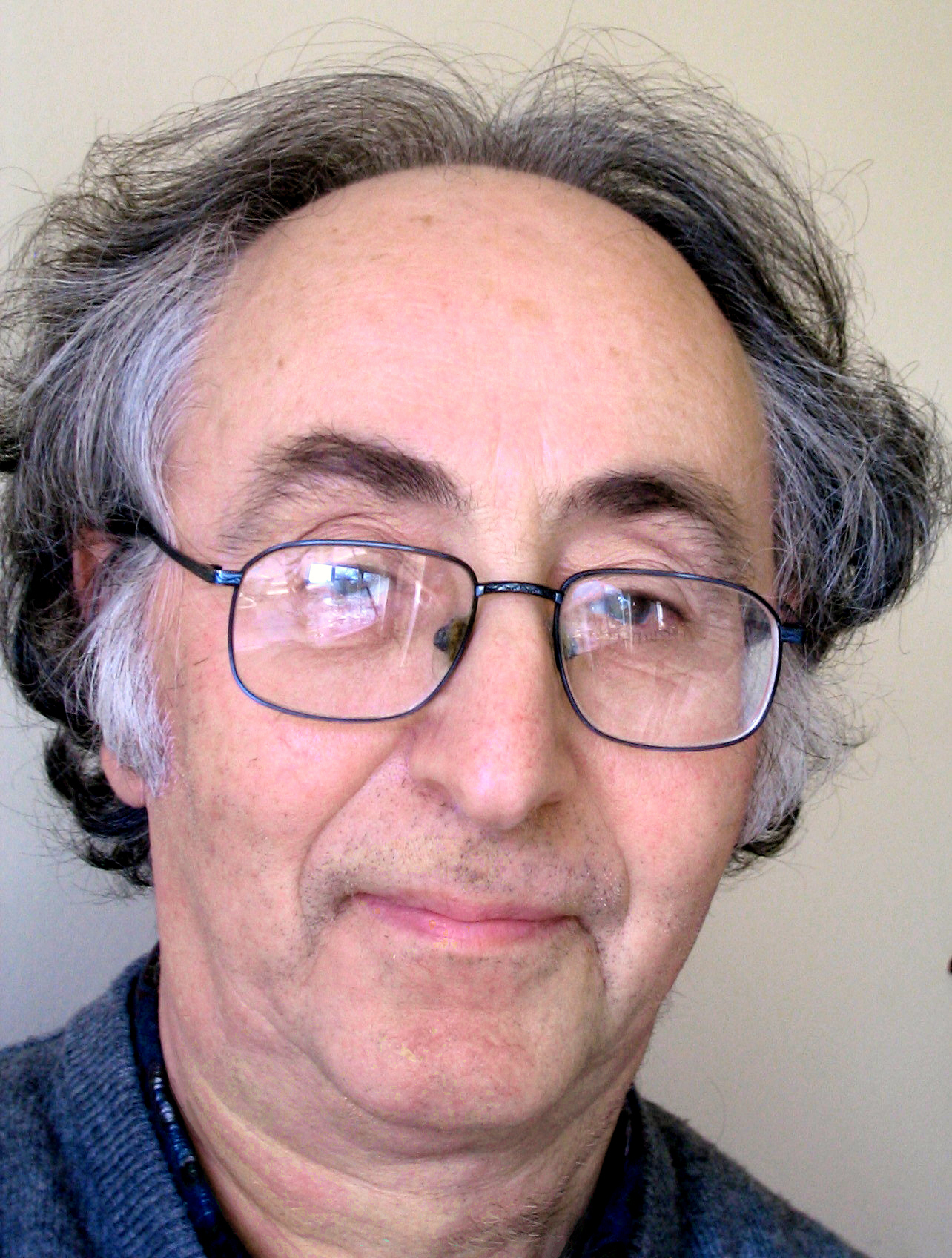
Brian Josephson

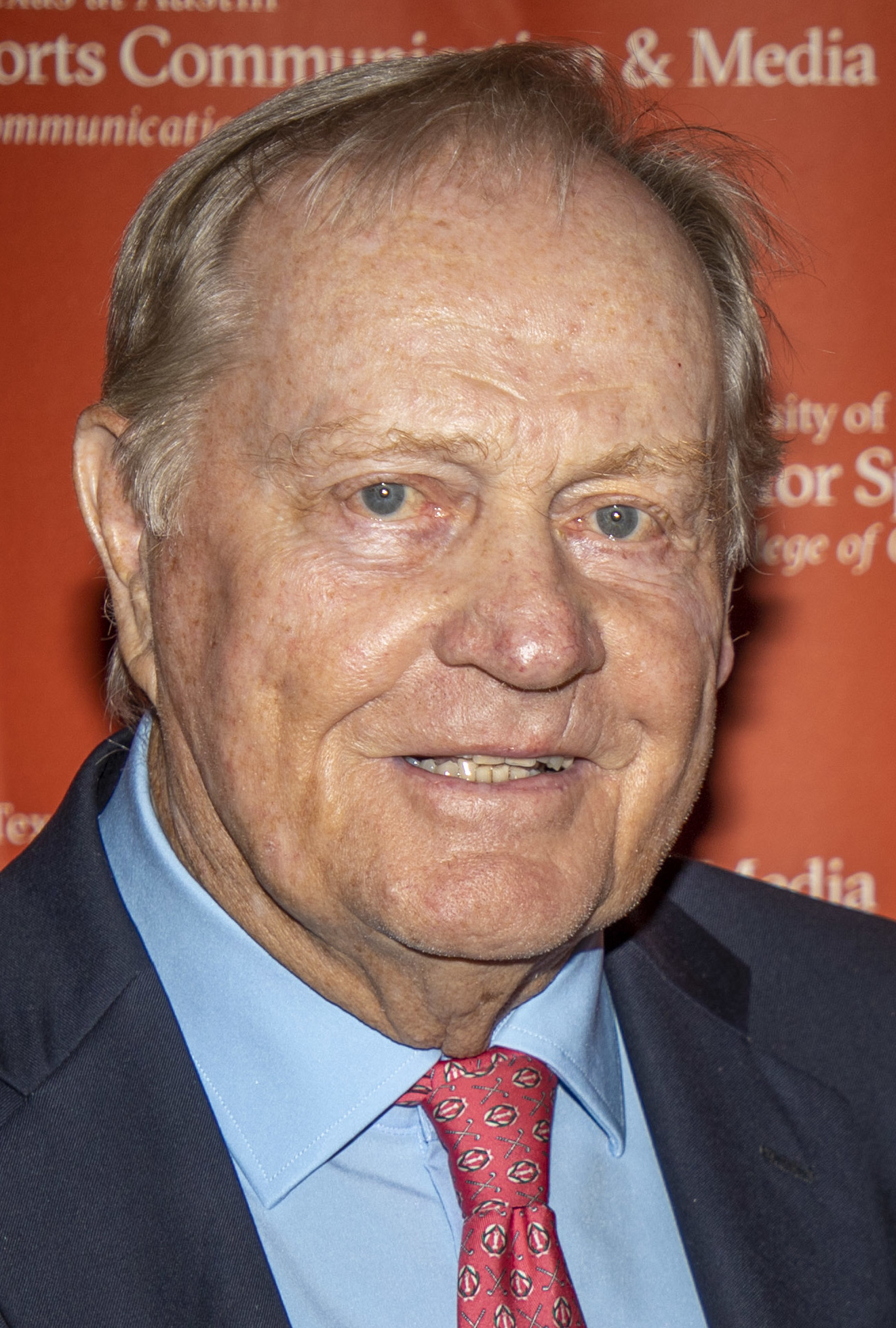
Jack Nicklaus

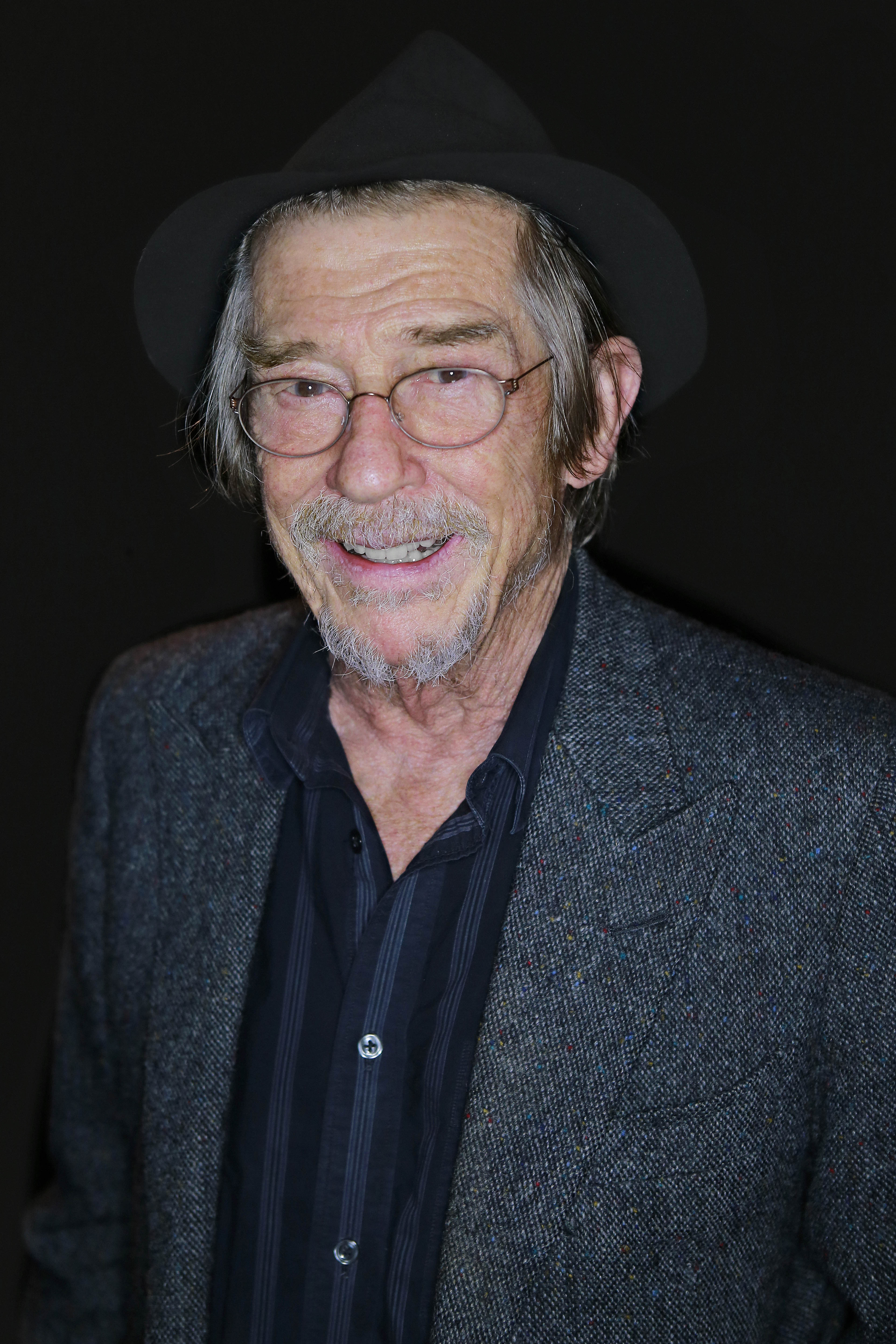
John Hurt

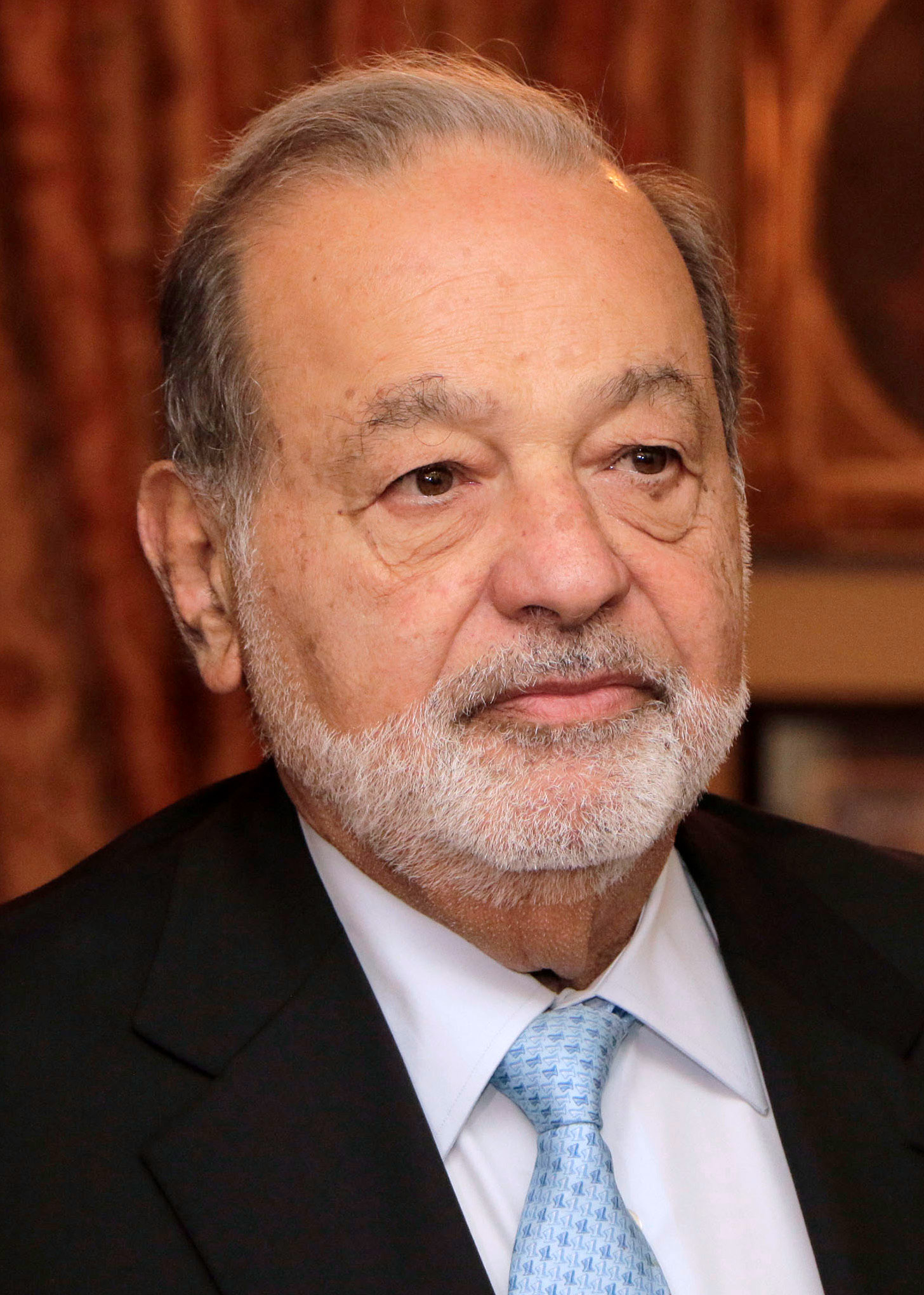
Carlos Slim

- January 2
  - Jim Bakker, American televangelist, ex-husband of Tammy Faye (d. 2026)
  - S. R. Srinivasa Varadhan, Indian-American mathematician
- January 3 – Thelma Schoonmaker, Algerian-born American film editor
- January 4
  - Helmut Jahn, German-American architect (d. 2021)
  - Brian Josephson, Welsh physicist, Nobel Prize laureate
  - Gao Xingjian, Chinese-born writer, Nobel Prize laureate
- January 8 – Jimmy O'Neill (DJ), American broadcaster (d. 2013)
- January 9 – Miguel Ángel Rodríguez, Costa Rican politician, lawyer, economist and businessman
- January 14 – Julian Bond, African-American civil rights activist (d. 2015)
- January 16 – Franz Müntefering, German politician
- January 17
  - Kipchoge Keino, Kenyan athlete
  - Nerses Bedros XIX Tarmouni, Armenian Catholic Patriarch of Cilicia (d. 2015)
  - Mircea Snegur, 1st President of Moldova (d. 2023)
  - Tabaré Vázquez, President of Uruguay (d. 2020)
- January 18 – Pedro Rodríguez, Mexican racing driver (d. 1971)
- January 19 – Paolo Borsellino, Italian judge and magistrate (d. 1992)
- January 20
  - Carol Heiss, American figure skater
  - Krishnam Raju, Indian actor and politician (d. 2022)
  - Tay Eng Soon, Singaporean politician (d. 1993)
- January 21 – Jack Nicklaus, American golfer
- January 22 – John Hurt, English actor (d. 2017)
- January 24 – Joachim Gauck, German politician, 11th President of Germany
- January 27
  - Brian O'Leary, American scientist, author and NASA astronaut (d. 2011)
  - James Cromwell, American actor
  - Petru Lucinschi, Moldovan politician, 2nd President of Moldova
- January 28 – Carlos Slim, Mexican businessman
- January 29
  - Katharine Ross, American actress
  - Kunimitsu Takahashi, Japanese motorcycle racer and racing driver (d. 2022)

=== February ===
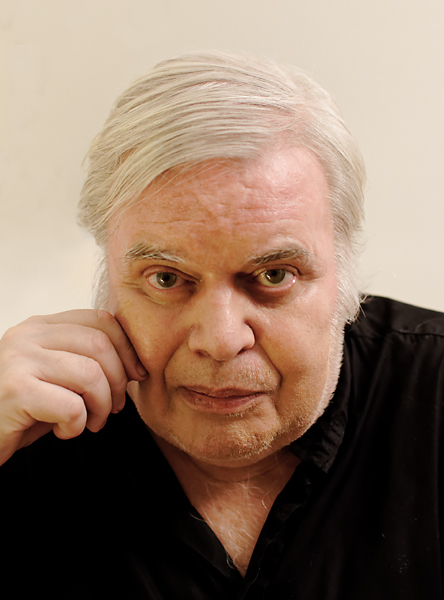
H. R. Giger

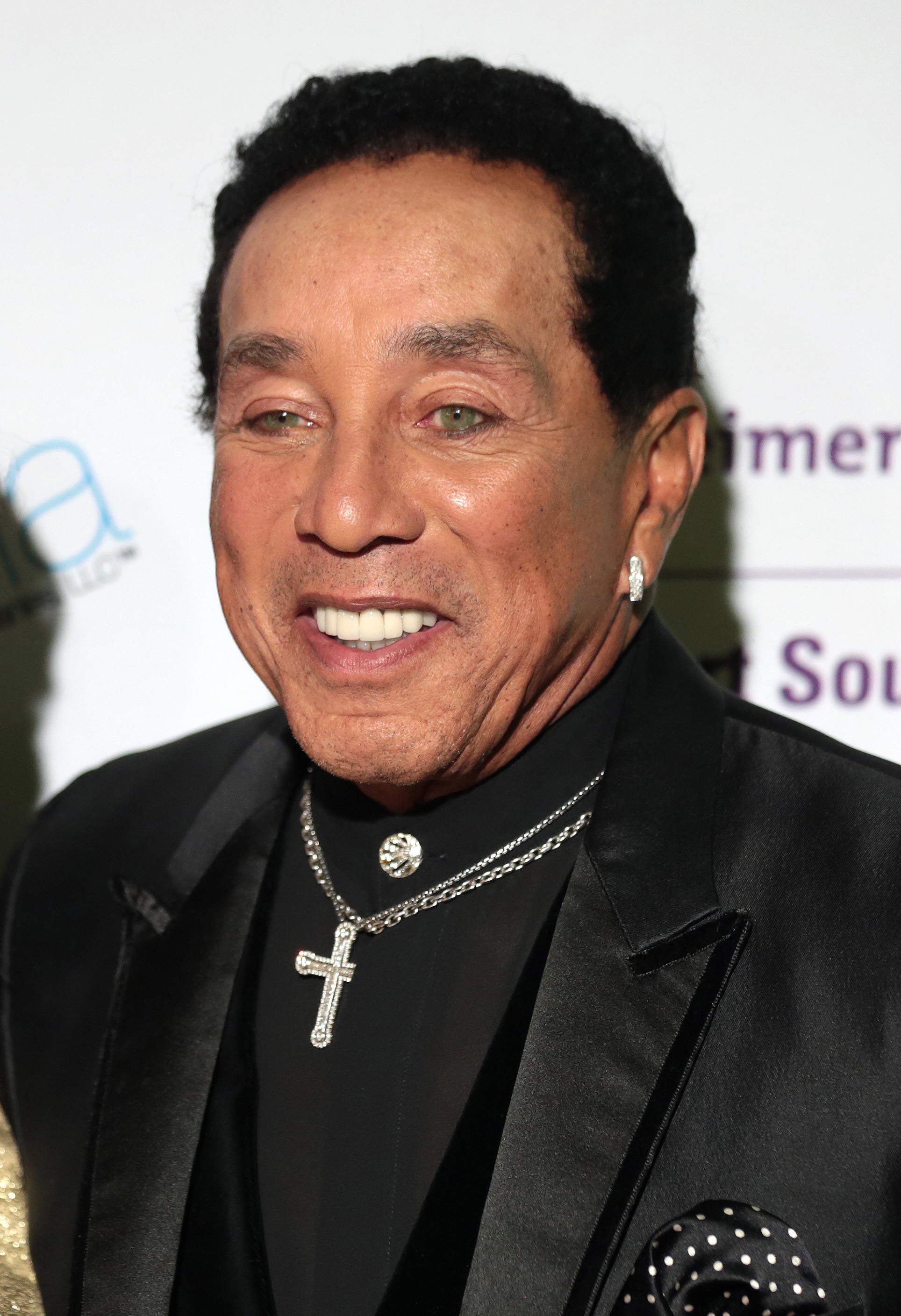
Smokey Robinson

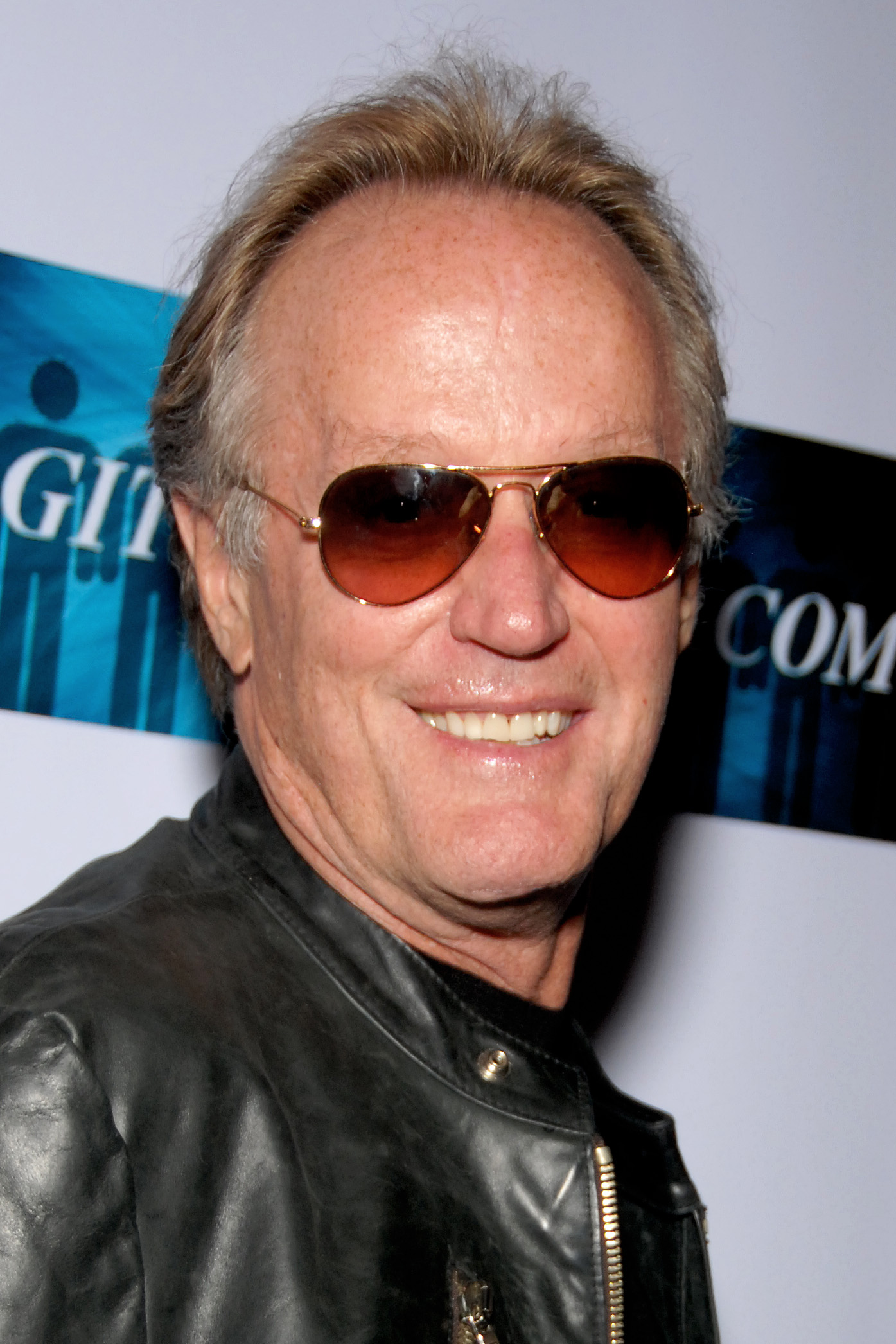
Peter Fonda

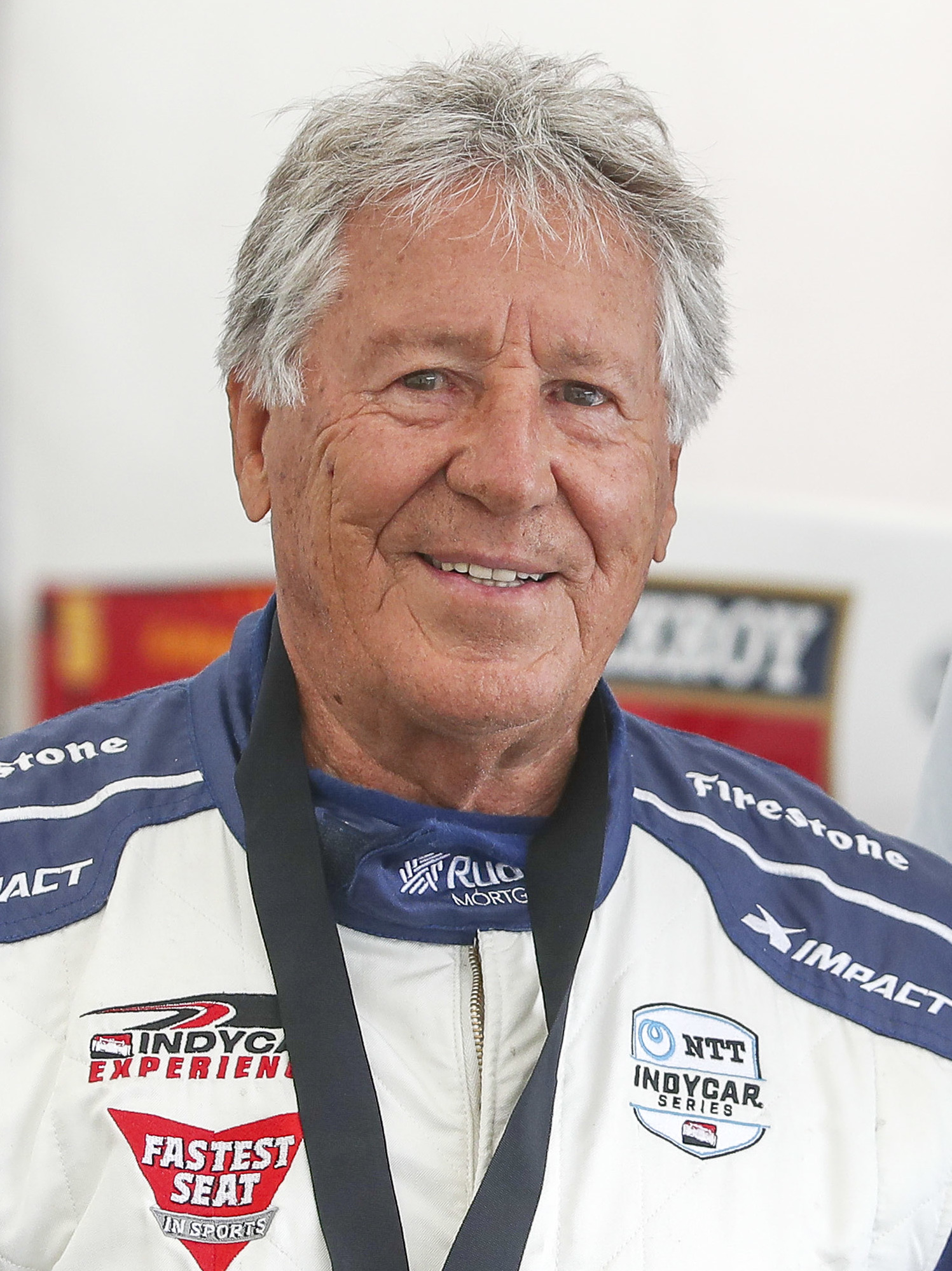
Mario Andretti

- February 2 – Sir David Jason, English actor
- February 4 – George A. Romero, American film writer, director (d. 2017)
- February 5 – H. R. Giger, Swiss artist (d. 2014)
- February 6 – Tom Brokaw, American television journalist and author
- February 7 – Tony Tan, 7th President of Singapore
- February 9
  - J. M. Coetzee, South African writer, Nobel Prize laureate
  - Seamus Deane, Irish poet and novelist (d. 2021)
- February 12 – Robert Saladrigas, Spanish writer, journalist and literary critic (d. 2018)
- February 15 – Hamzah Haz, Indonesian politician, 9th Vice President of Indonesia
- February 17
  - Vicente Fernández, Mexican actor and singer (d. 2021)
  - Willi Holdorf, German Olympic decathlete (d. 2020)
  - Gene Pitney, American singer (d. 2006)
- February 18 – Fabrizio De André, Italian singer, songwriter (d. 1999)
- February 19
  - Renate Hellwig, German politician
  - Smokey Robinson, African-American musician
- February 20 – Jimmy Greaves, English footballer (d. 2021)
- February 21 – John Lewis, African-American politician, civil rights activist (d. 2020)
- February 23 – Peter Fonda, American actor (Easy Rider) (d. 2019)
- February 24
  - Pete Duel, American actor (Alias Smith and Jones) (d. 1971)
  - Jimmy Ellis, African-American professional boxer (d. 2014)
  - Denis Law, Scottish footballer (d. 2025)
- February 25 – Jesús López Cobos, Spanish-born conductor (d. 2018)
- February 27 – Bill Hunter, Australian actor (d. 2011)
- February 28
  - Mario Andretti, Italian-born American racing driver
  - Joe South, American singer-songwriter (d. 2012)

=== March ===
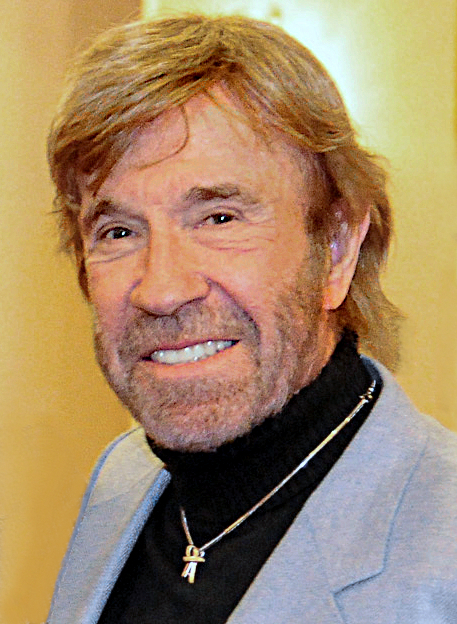
Chuck Norris

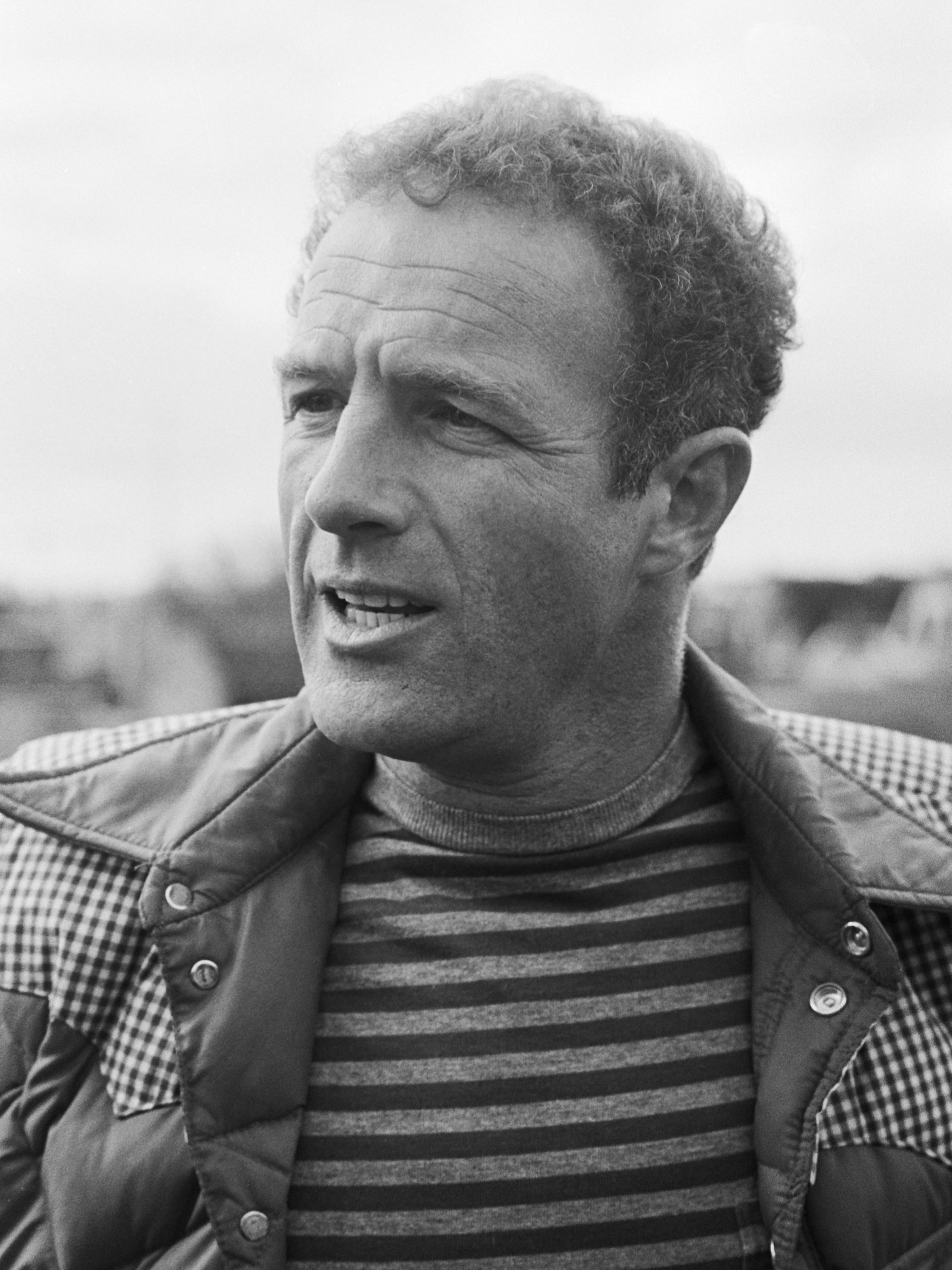
James Caan

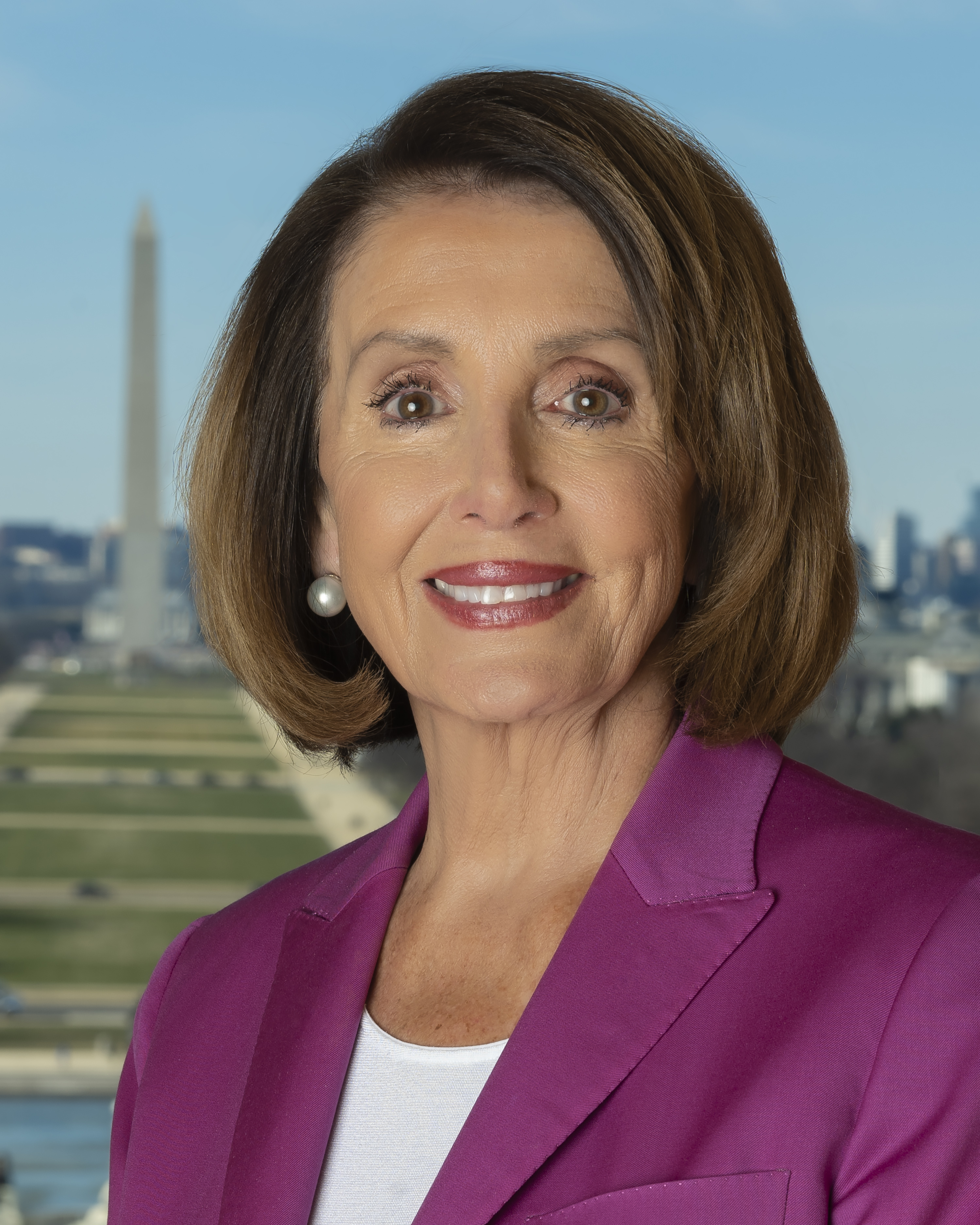
Nancy Pelosi

- March 1
  - David Broome, Welsh show jumping champion
  - Nuala O'Faolain, Irish journalist, author (d. 2008)
- March 2 – Billy McNeill, Scottish football player and manager (d. 2019)
- March 3 – Germán Castro Caycedo, Colombian writer, journalist (d. 2021)
- March 4 – Vladimir Morosov, Soviet athlete (d. 2023)
- March 7
  - Rudi Dutschke, German radical student leader (d. 1979)
  - Viktor Savinykh, Soviet cosmonaut
- March 9 – Raul Julia, Puerto Rican actor (d. 1994)
- March 10 – Chuck Norris, American actor, martial artist (d. 2026)
- March 12 – Al Jarreau, African-American singer (d. 2017)
- March 13 – Candi Staton, American singer
- March 16
  - Jan Pronk, Dutch politician, diplomat
  - James Wong Jim, Hong Kong composer (d. 2004)
- March 20 – Paul Neville, Australian politician (d. 2019)
- March 21 – Solomon Burke, African-American singer, songwriter (d. 2010)
- March 22 – Haing S. Ngor, Cambodian actor (The Killing Fields) (d. 1996)
- March 25
  - Anita Bryant, American entertainer (d. 2024)
  - Mina, Italian-Swiss singer
- March 26
  - James Caan, American actor (d. 2022)
  - Nancy Pelosi, American politician; Speaker and Minority Leader (alternately) of the United States House of Representatives
  - Jörg Streli, Austrian architect (d. 2019)
- March 27 – Marie Jepsen, Danish politician (d. 2018)
- March 29 – Astrud Gilberto, Brazilian-born singer (d. 2023)
- March 30 – Jerry Lucas, American professional basketball player
- March 31 – Patrick Leahy, American politician

=== April ===
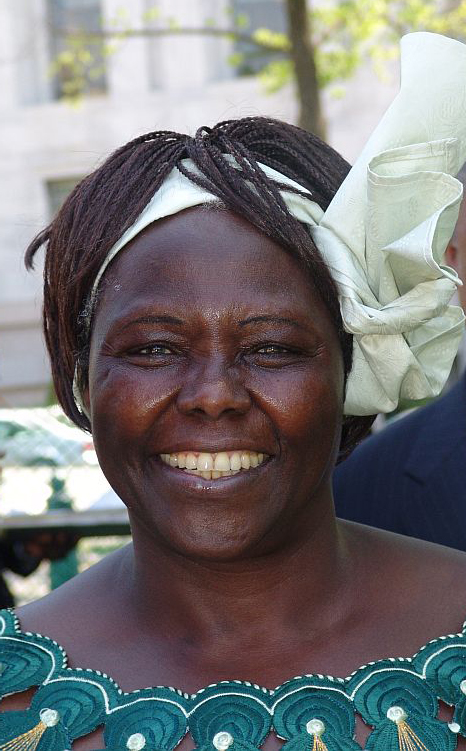
Wangari Maathai

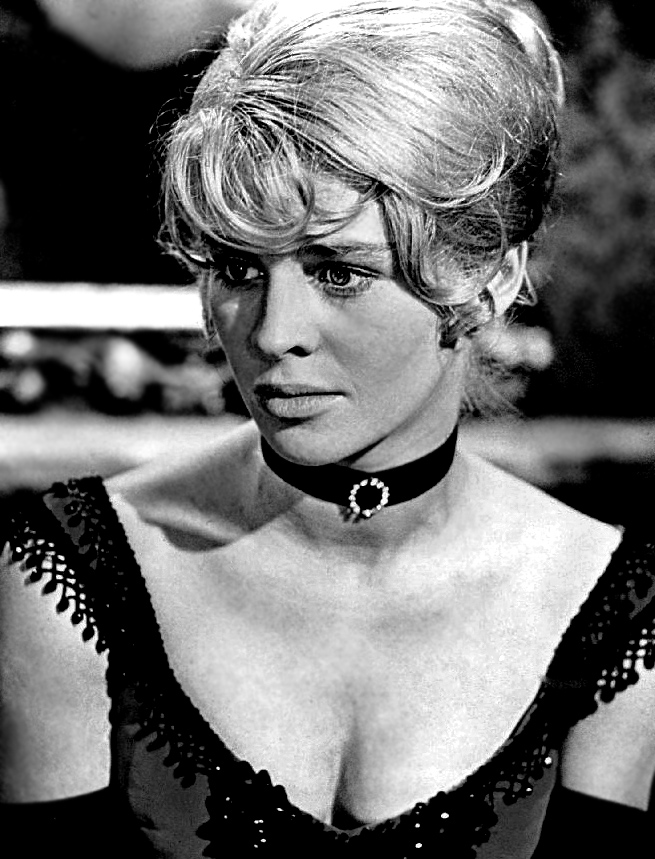
Julie Christie

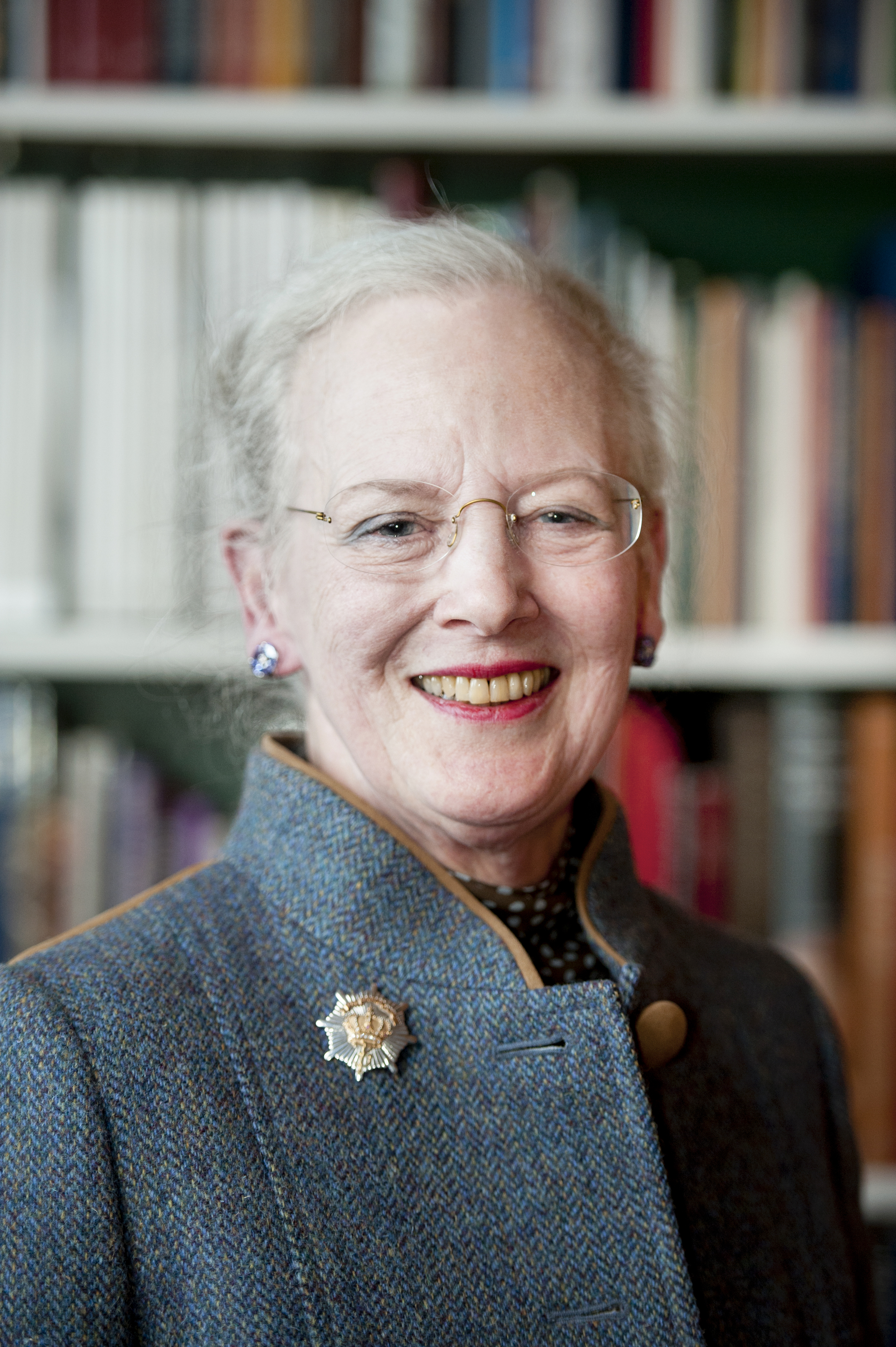
Margrethe II of Denmark

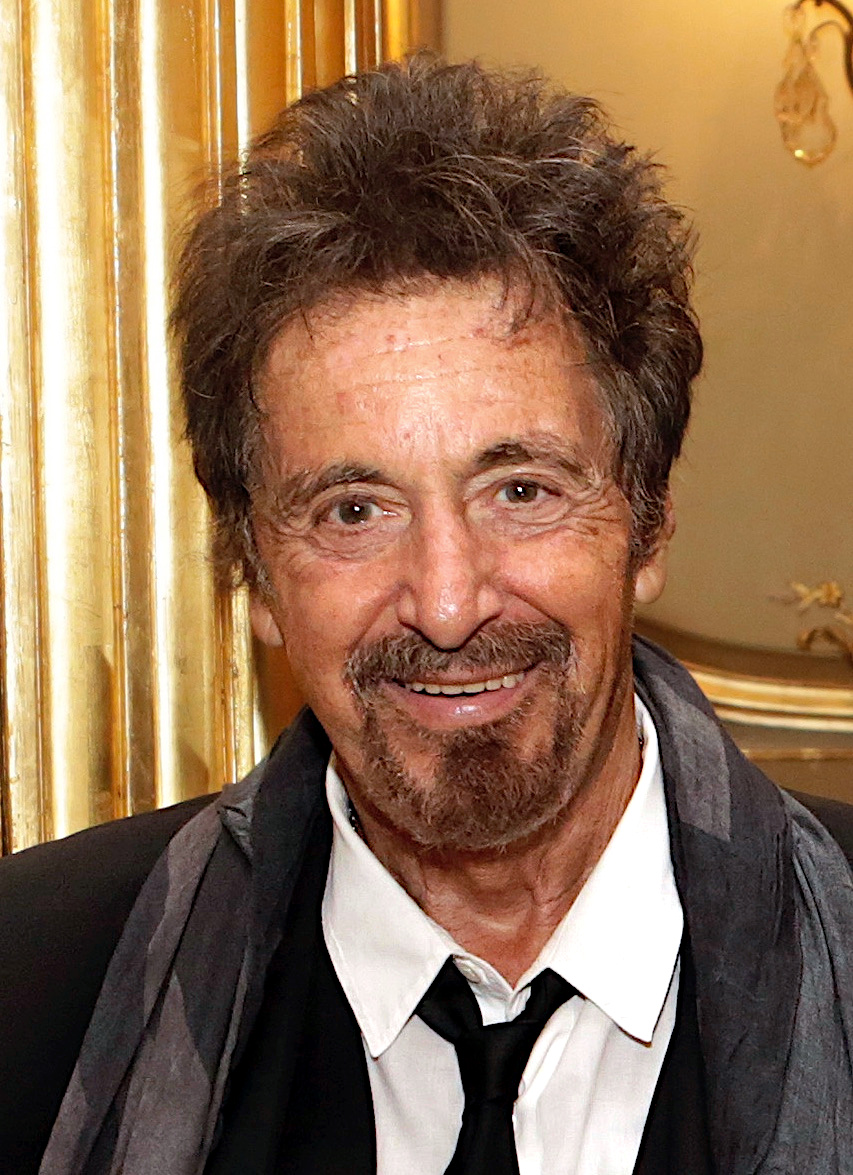
Al Pacino

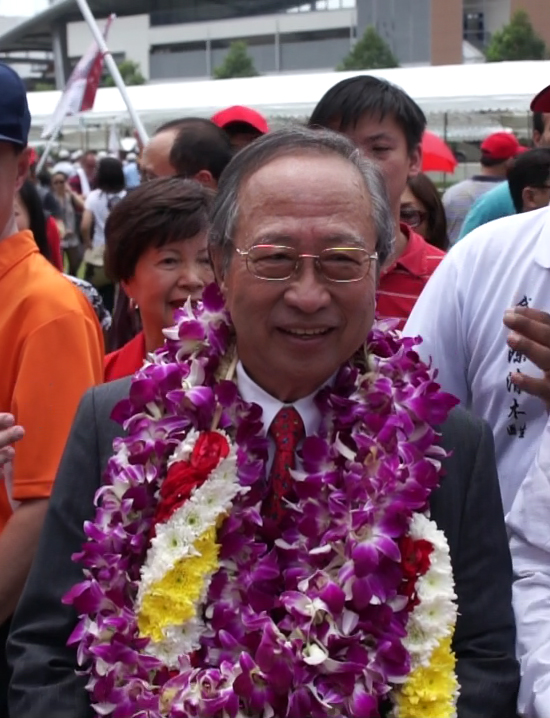
Tan Cheng Bock

- April 1 – Wangari Maathai, Kenyan environmentalist, recipient of the Nobel Peace Prize (d. 2011)
- April 2
  - Mike Hailwood, English motorcycle racer (d. 1981)
  - Dame Penelope Keith, English actress (d. 2026)|
- April 4 – Robby Müller, Dutch cinematographer (d. 2018)
- April 6 – Pedro Armendáriz Jr., Mexican actor (d. 2011)
- April 8 – John Havlicek, American basketball player (d. 2019)
- April 12 – Herbie Hancock, African-American pianist, keyboardist, bandleader, composer and actor
- April 13
  - J. M. G. Le Clézio, French writer and professor
  - Max Mosley, British motorsport boss (d. 2021)
  - José Nápoles, Cuban-born Mexican boxer (d. 2019)
- April 14
  - Julie Christie, English actress
  - Countess Marie Kinsky of Wchinitz and Tettau (d. 2021)
- April 15
  - Faimalaga Luka, 6th Prime Minister of Tuvalu (d. 2005)
  - Robert Walker, American actor (d. 2019)
  - Yossef Romano, Israeli weightlifter (d. 1972)
- April 16
  - David Holford, Barbadian cricketer (d. 2022)
  - Queen Margrethe II of Denmark
- April 17 – John McCririck, English horse racing pundit (d. 2019)
- April 18
  - Ira von Furstenberg, European socialite and actress (d. 2024)
  - Joseph L. Goldstein, American scientist, recipient of the Nobel Prize in Physiology or Medicine
  - Ken Shellito, English footballer, manager (d. 2018)
- April 19 – Reinhard Bonnke, German Pentecostal evangelist (d. 2019)
- April 20 – Pilar Miró, Spanish screenwriter and film director (d. 1997)
- April 22 – Marie-José Nat, French actress (d. 2019)
- April 23 – Danilo Astori, Uruguayan politician, 15th Vice President of Uruguay
- April 24 – Sue Grafton, American detective novelist (d. 2017)
- April 25 – Al Pacino, American actor, film director
- April 26
  - Tan Cheng Bock, Singaporean doctor and politician
  - Giorgio Moroder, Italian film composer
- April 30 – Ermindo Onega, Argentine footballer (d. 1979)

=== May ===
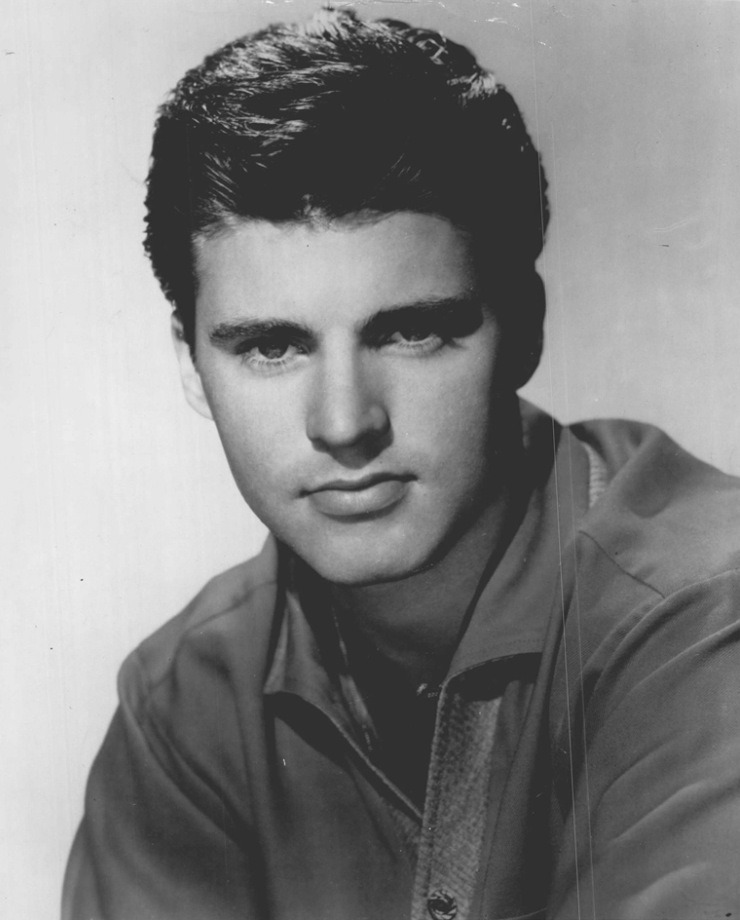
Ricky Nelson

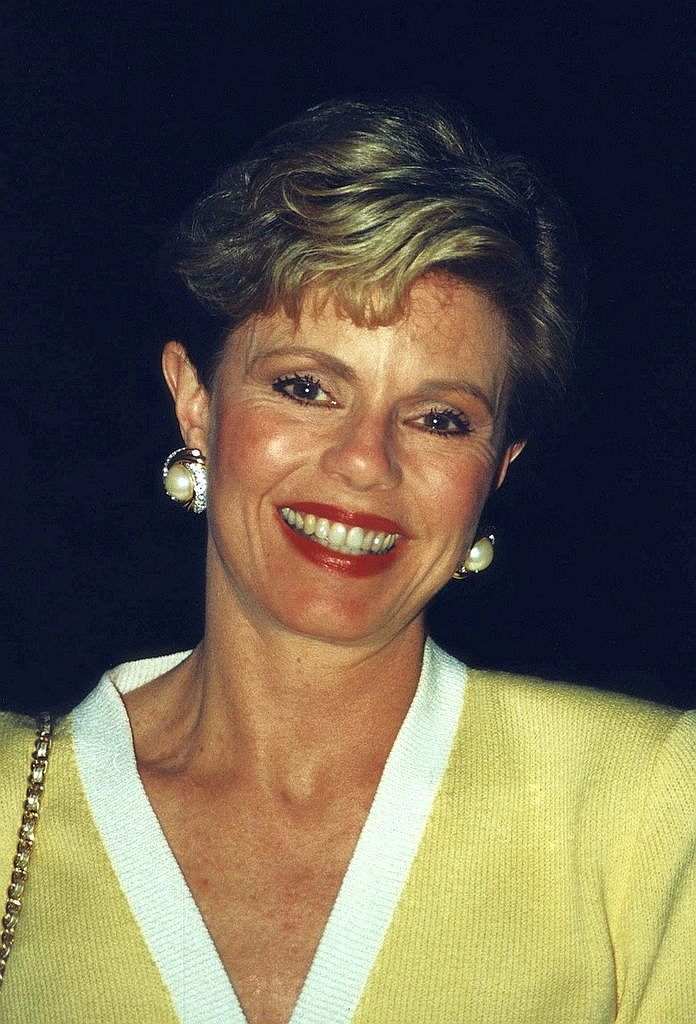
Toni Tennille

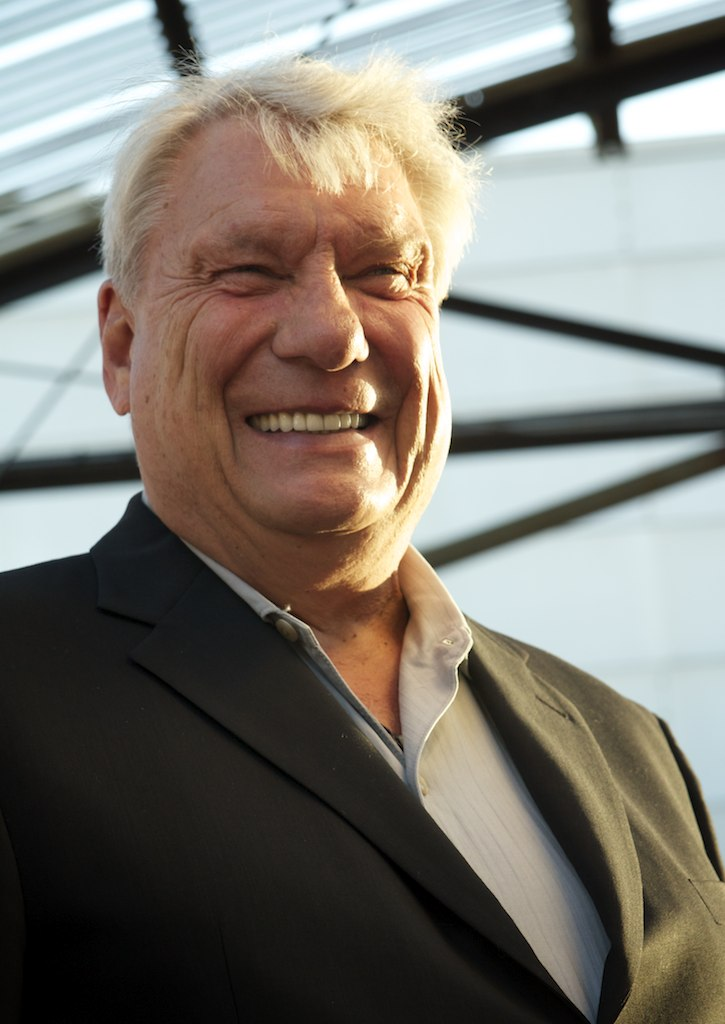
Don Nelson

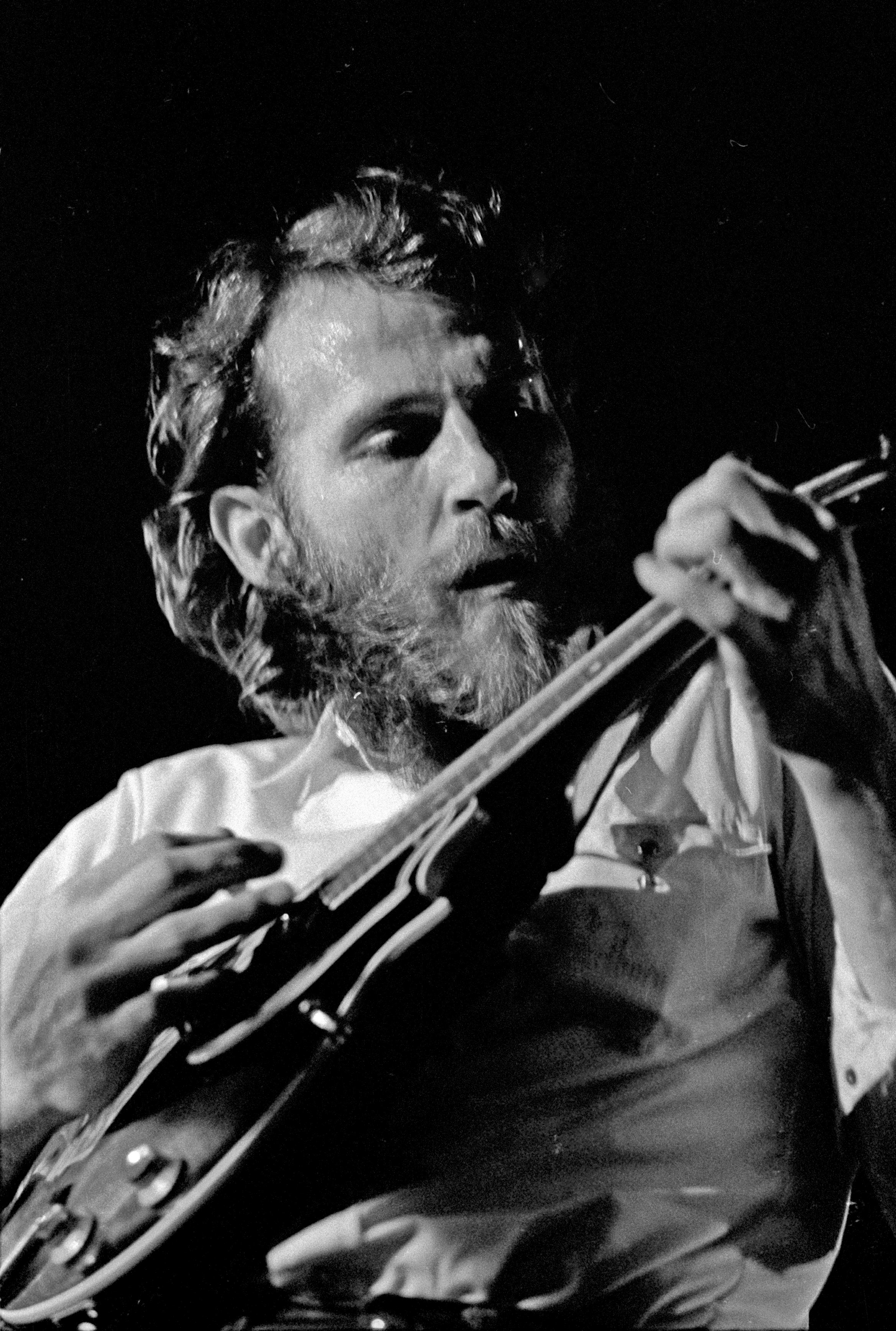
Levon Helm

- May 1 – Elsa Peretti, Italian jewelry designer (d. 2021)
- May 2
  - Manuel Esquivel, Belizean politician, 2nd Prime Minister of Belize (d. 2022)
  - Hariton Pushwagner, Norwegian artist (d. 2018)
- May 3
  - David Koch, American businessman (d. 2019)
  - Oemarsono, Indonesian civil servant and politician (d. 2022)
- May 5 – Lance Henriksen, American actor
- May 7 – Angela Carter, English author, editor (d. 1992)
- May 8
  - Peter Benchley, American author (Jaws) (d. 2006)
  - Emilio Delgado, American actor (Sesame Street), singer and activist (d. 2022)
  - Ricky Nelson, American singer (d. 1985)
  - Toni Tennille, American pop singer
- May 9 – James L. Brooks, American film producer, writer
- May 13 – Bruce Chatwin, British author (d. 1989)
- May 15
  - Lainie Kazan, American actress, singer
  - Don Nelson, American basketball player and coach (d. 2026)
- May 16 – Ole Ernst, Danish actor (d. 2013)
- May 17
  - Adel Emam, Egyptian actor and comedian
  - Alan Kay, American computer scientist
- May 19 – Jan Janssen, Dutch cyclist
- May 20
  - Shorty Long, African-American soul music singer, songwriter, musician and record producer (Here Comes The Judge) (d. 1969)
  - Stan Mikita, Slovak-born Canadian hockey player (d. 2018)
  - Sadaharu Oh, Japanese baseball player
- May 22 – Bernard Shaw, African-American journalist and television news reporter (d. 2022)
- May 24 – Joseph Brodsky, Russian-born poet, Nobel Prize laureate (d. 1996)
- May 26 – Levon Helm, American musician and actor (d. 2012)
- May 27 – Sotsha Dlamini, 5th Prime Minister of Swaziland (d. 2017)
- May 29 – Farooq Leghari, 8th President of Pakistan (d. 2010)

=== June ===
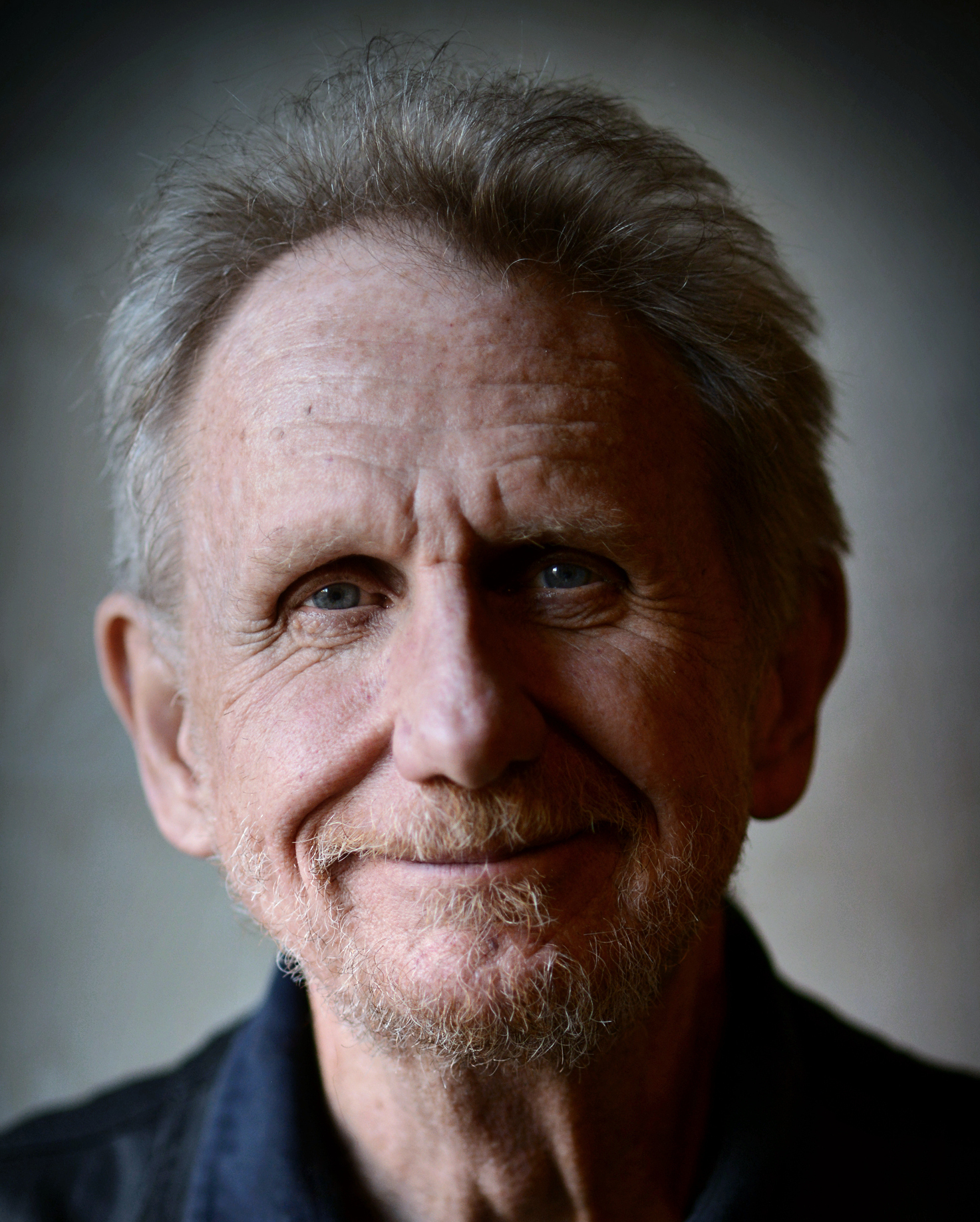
René Auberjonois

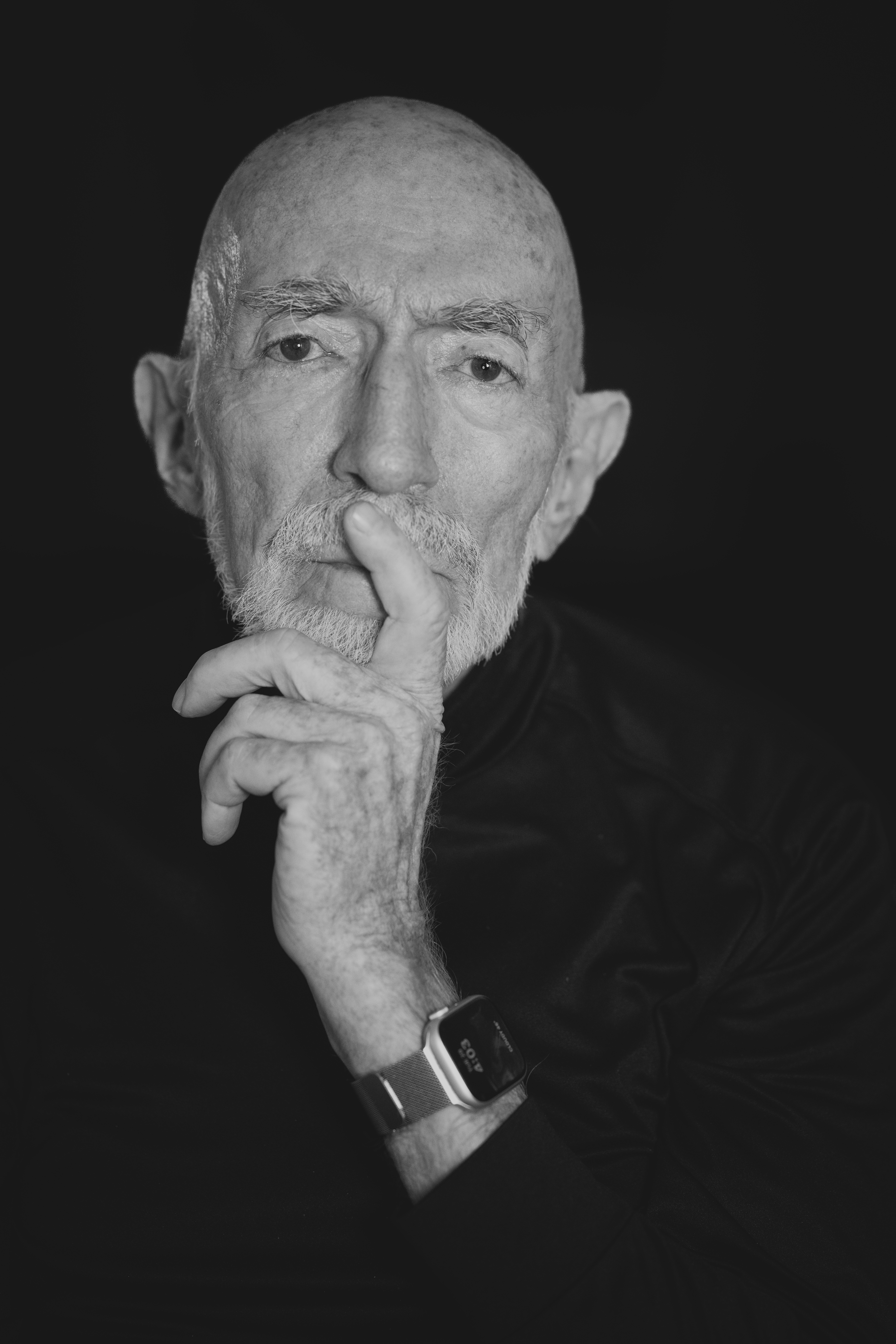
Kip Thorne

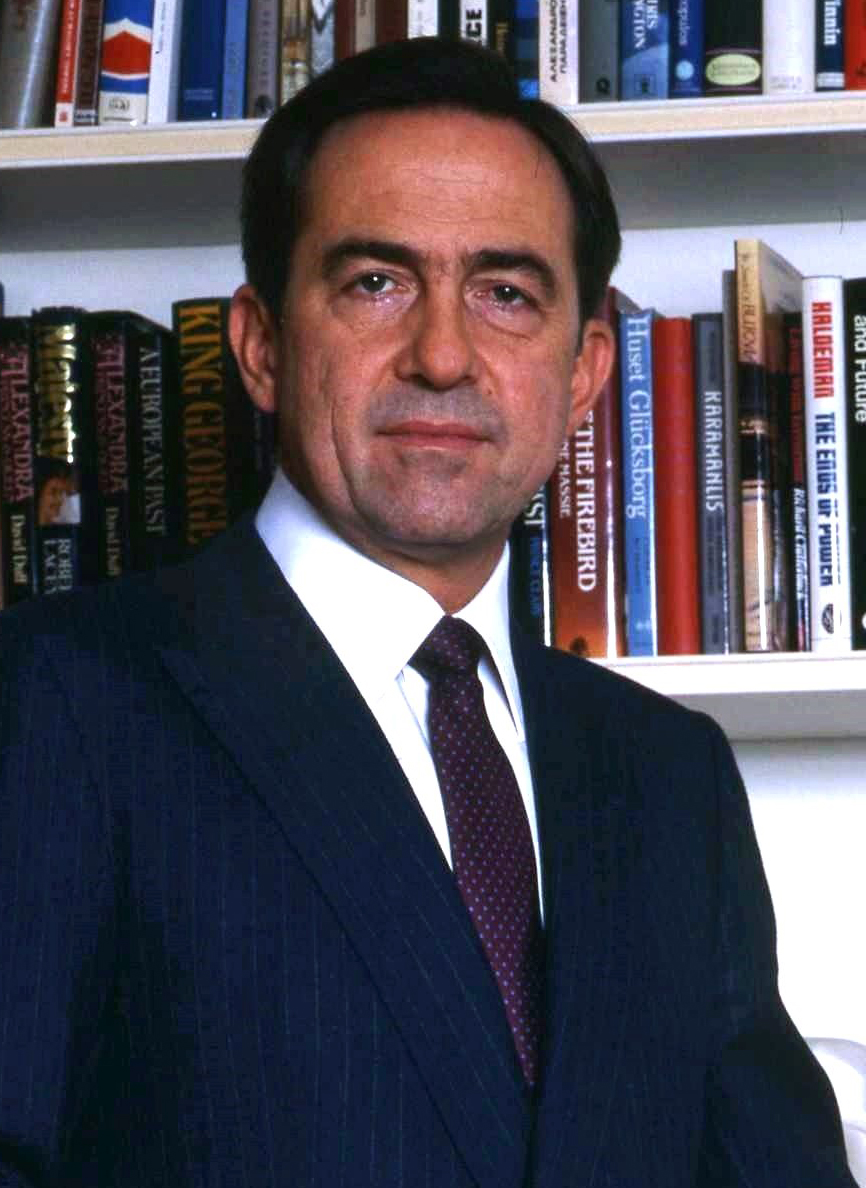
Constantine II of Greece

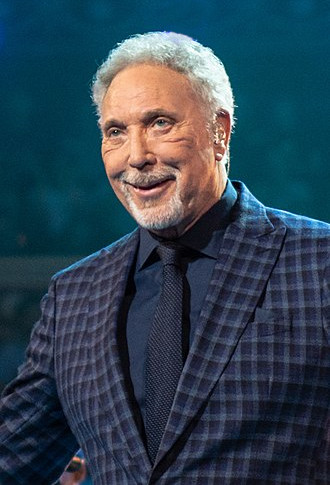
Sir Tom Jones

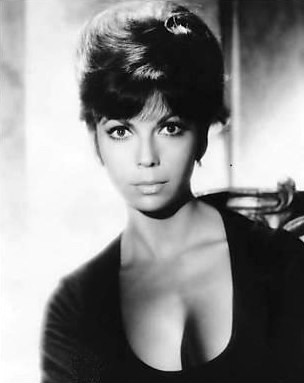
Nancy Sinatra

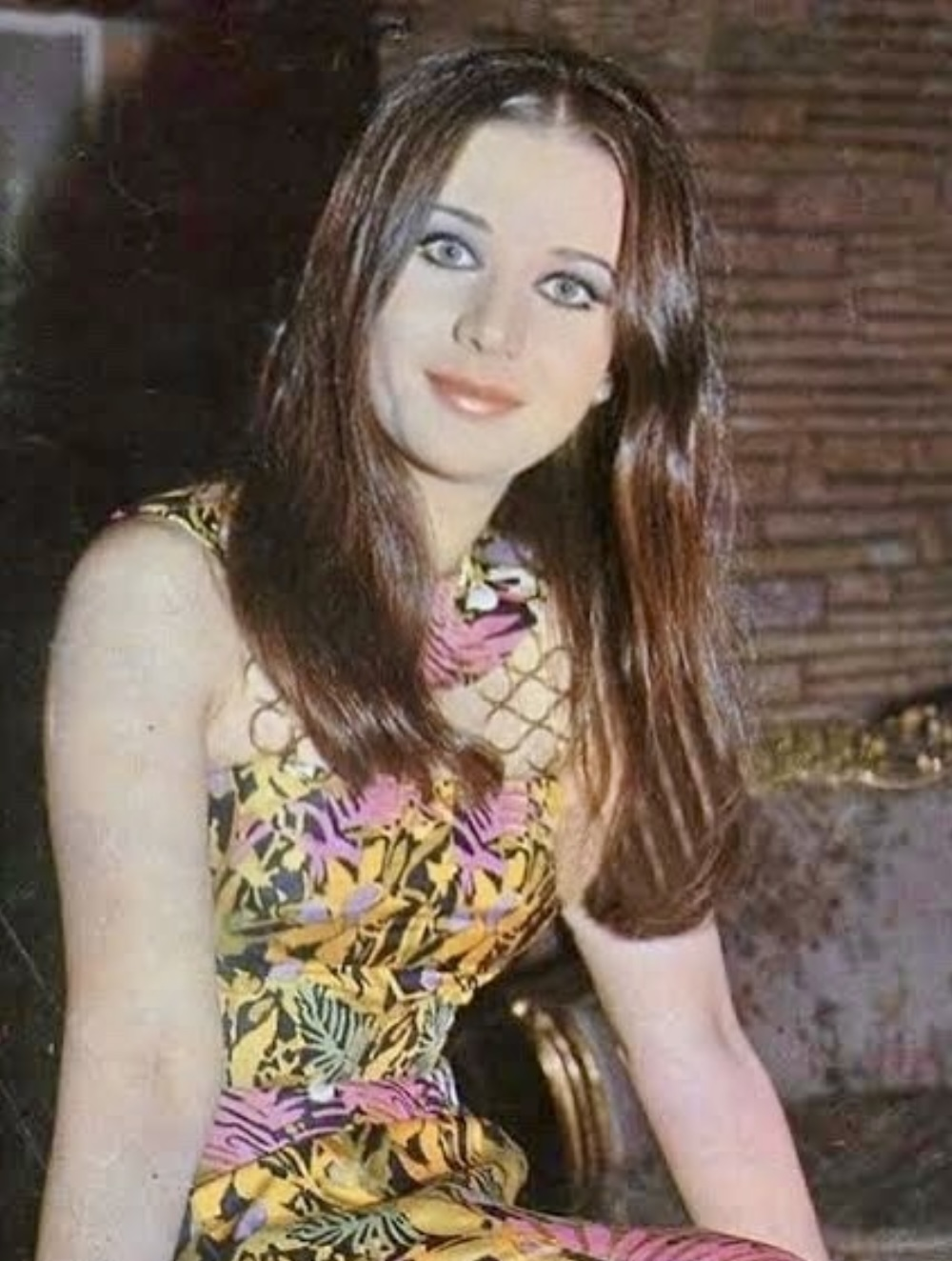
Zubaida Tharwat

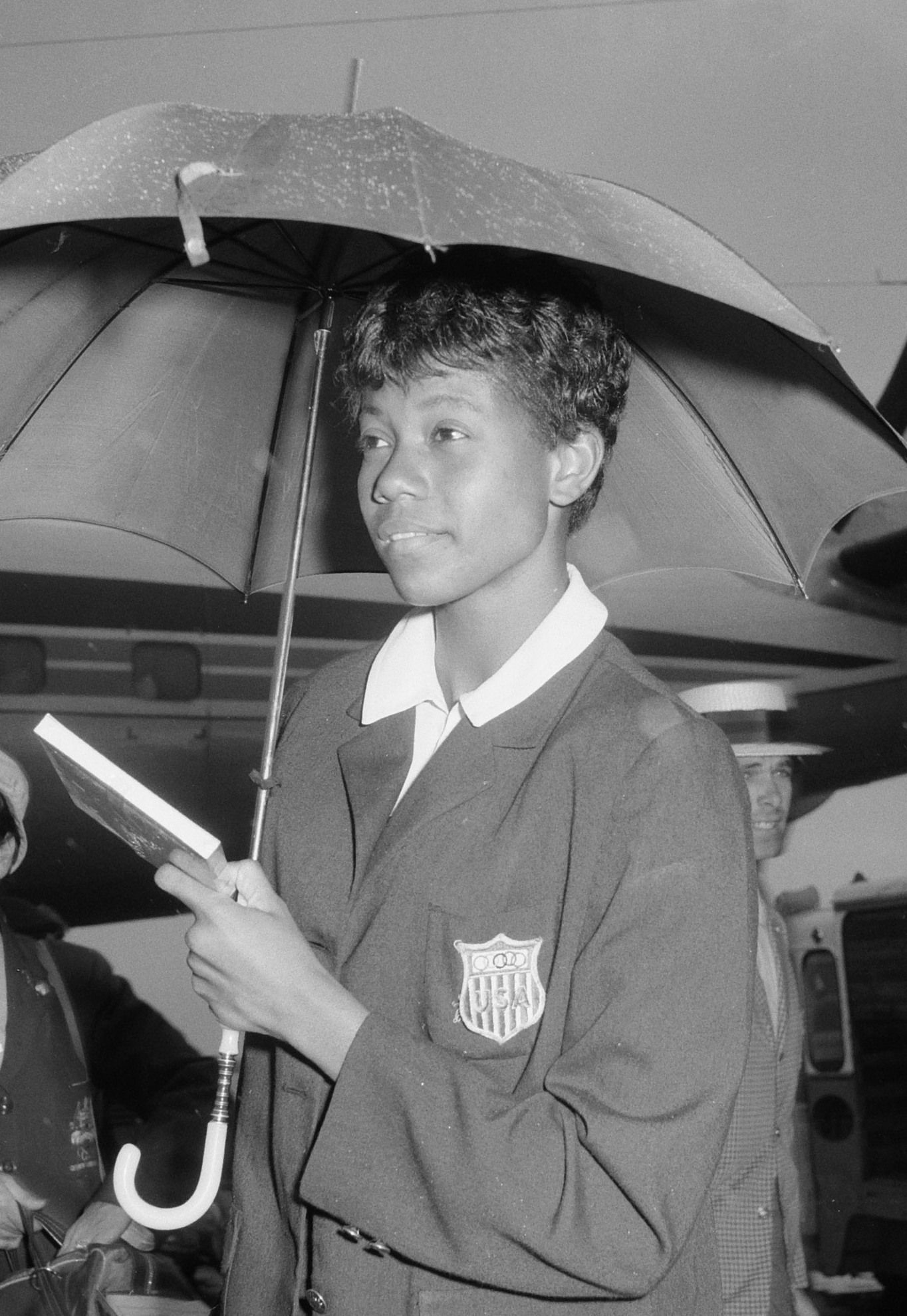
Wilma Rudolph

- June 1
  - René Auberjonois, American screen actor (d. 2019)
  - Kip Thorne, American gravitational physicist, Nobel Prize laureate
- June 2 – Constantine II of Greece (d. 2023)
- June 4
  - Edward A. Brudno, American fighter pilot and prisoner of war during the Vietnam War (d. 1973)
  - Ludwig Schwarz, Austrian prelate (d. 2026)
- June 7
  - Samuel Little, American serial killer (d. 2020)
  - Sir Tom Jones, Welsh singer
  - Ronald Pickup, English actor (d. 2021)
- June 8 – Nancy Sinatra, American singer
- June 9 – Barry McDonald, Papua New Guinea-Australian rugby union player (d. 2020)
- June 13 – Bobby Freeman, American singer-songwriter (d. 2017)
- June 14 – Jack Bannon, American actor (d. 2017)
- June 15
  - Zubaida Tharwat, Egyptian actress (d. 2016)
- June 16
  - Neil Goldschmidt, American politician, Governor of Oregon (d. 2024)
  - Taylor Gun-Jin Wang, Chinese-American astronaut
  - Thea White, American voice actress (d. 2021)
- June 17
  - George Akerlof, American economist, Nobel Prize laureate
  - Ali Saibou, 3rd President of Niger (d. 2011)
- June 20
  - Eugen Drewermann, German theologian, activist and priest
  - John Mahoney, English-born American actor (d. 2018)
- June 21 – Michael Ruse, British-Canadian philosopher (d. 2024)
- June 22
  - Egon Henninger, German swimmer
  - Abbas Kiarostami, Iranian film director, screenwriter and producer (d. 2016)
  - Dame Esther Rantzen, British broadcaster and campaigner (d. 2026)
- June 23
  - Wilma Rudolph, American Olympic athlete (d. 1994)
  - Willie Wallace, Scottish association footballer and coach
- June 24
  - Hope Cooke, American socialite, Queen Consort of Sikkim
  - Murali Mohan, Indian film actor, producer, politician and business executive
  - Walter Ofonagoro, Nigerian scholar, politician and businessman
  - Ian Ross, Australian newsreader (d. 2014)
  - Vittorio Storaro, Italian cinematographer
- June 25
  - Thomas Köhler, East German luger
  - Mary Beth Peil, American actress and singer
- June 26 – Jerry Fujio, Japanese singer, actor and tarento (d. 2021)
- June 27 – Anil Karanjai, Indian painter of the Hungry generation movement (d. 2001)
- June 28
  - Karpal Singh, Malaysian politician and lawyer (d. 2014)
  - Muhammad Yunus, Bangladeshi founder of Grameen Bank, Nobel Prize laureate
- June 29 – Vyacheslav Artyomov, Russian composer
- June 30 – Neelo, Indian actress (d. 2021)

=== July ===
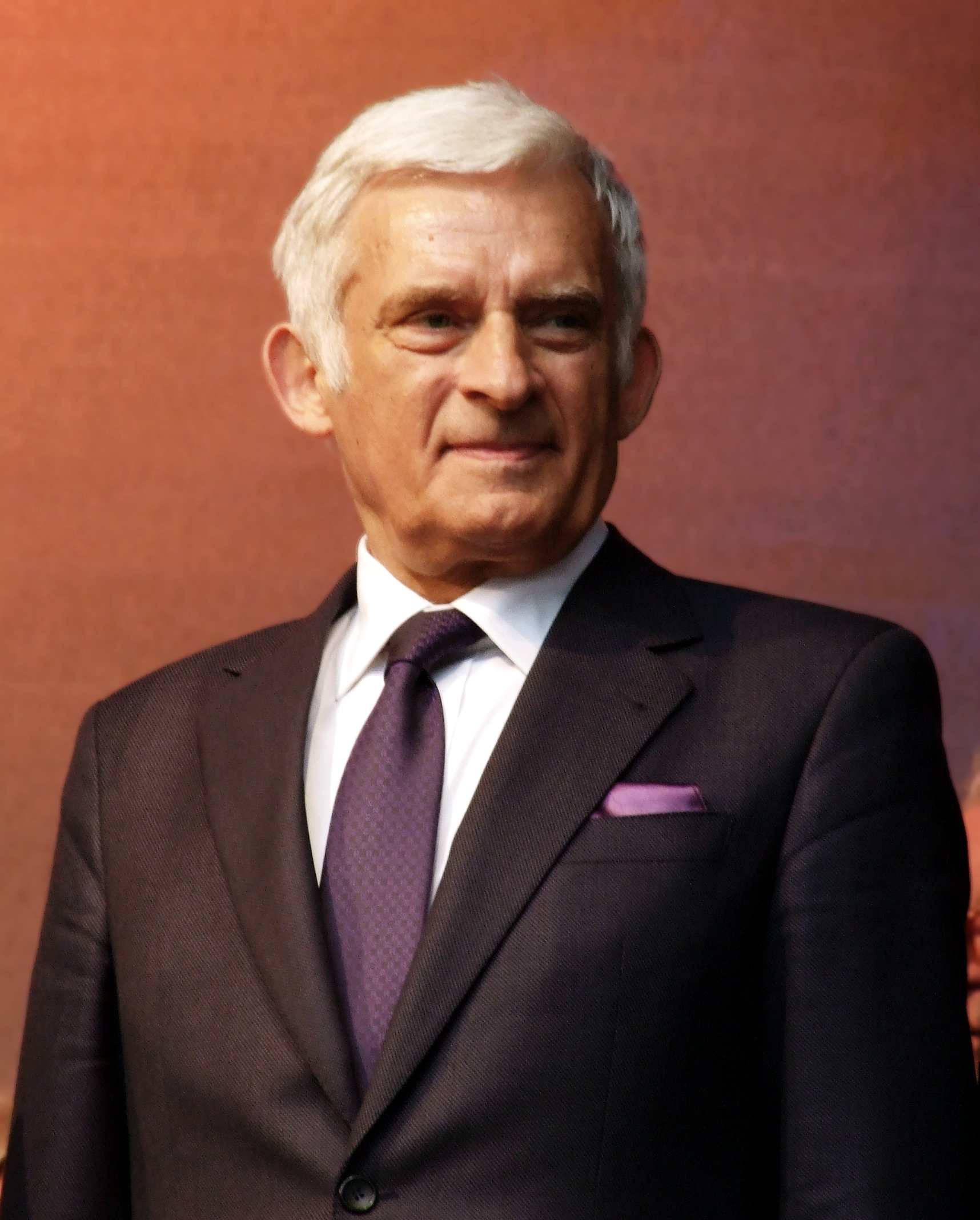
Jerzy Buzek

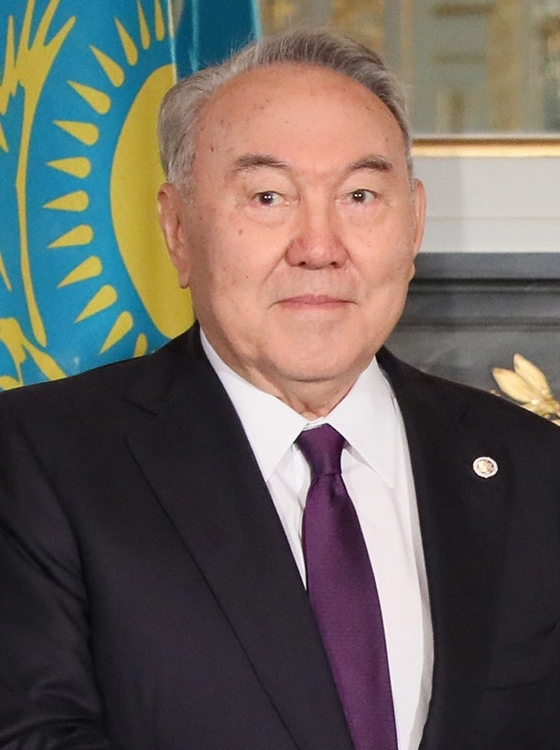
Nursultan Nazarbayev

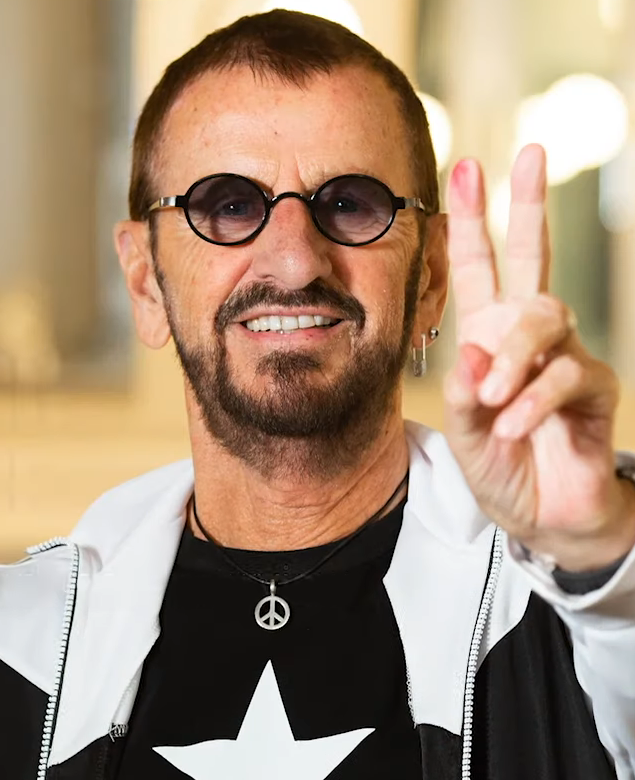
Sir Ringo Starr

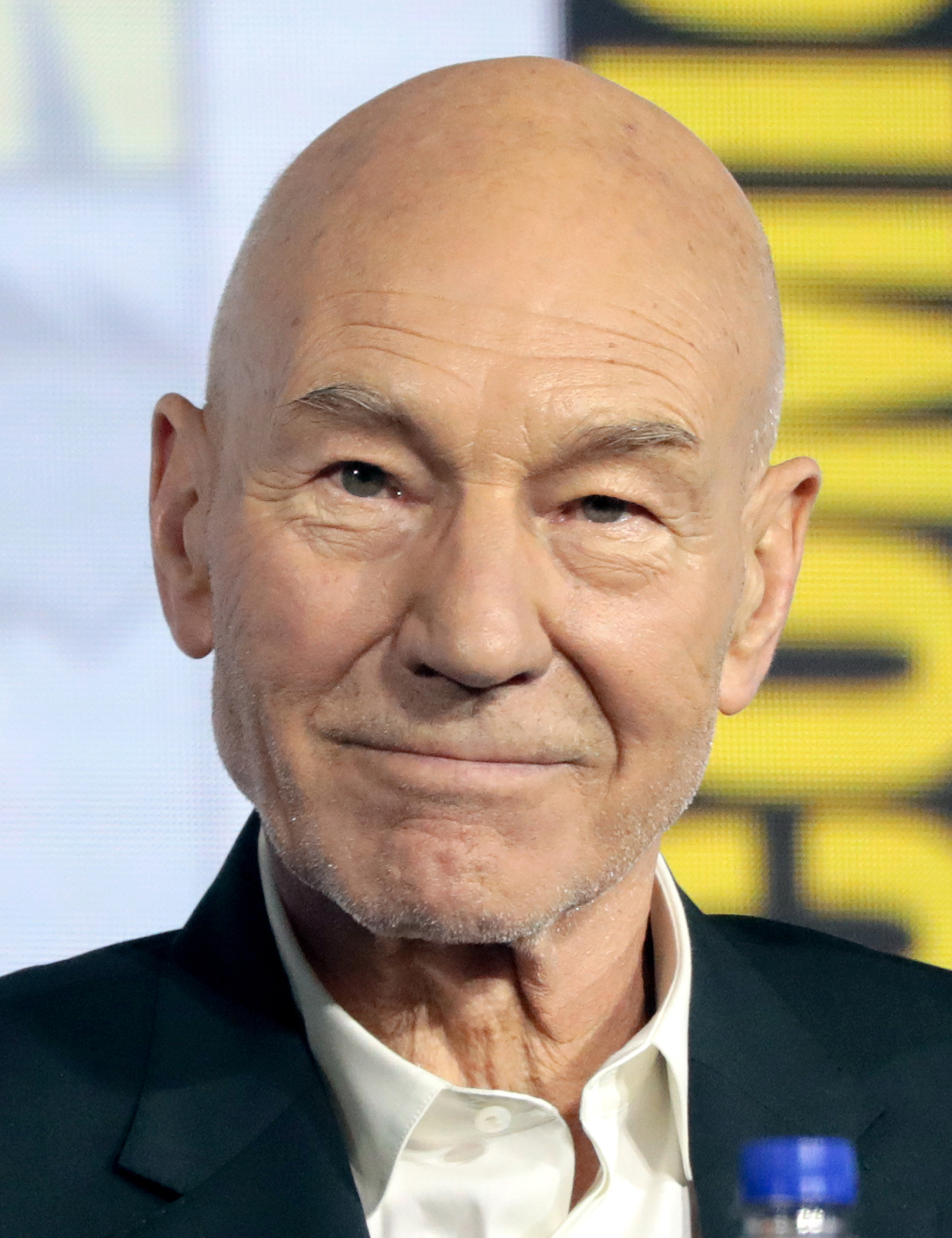
Sir Patrick Stewart

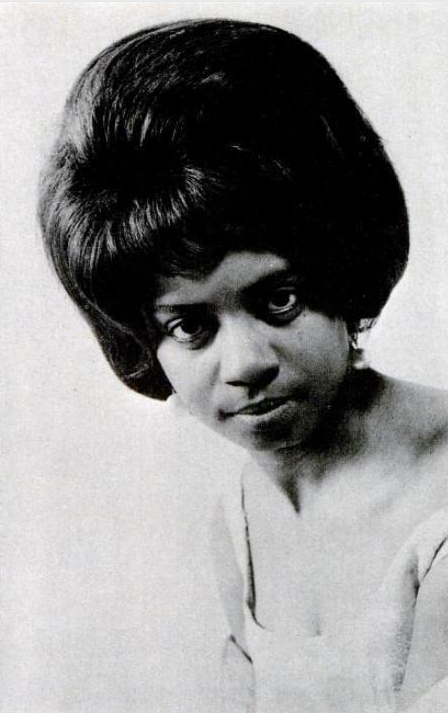
Fontella Bass

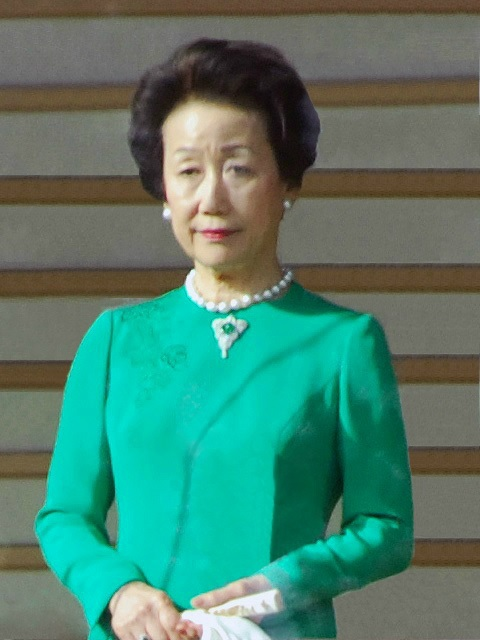
Hanako, Princess Hitachi

- July 1
  - Fukunohana Koichi, Japanese sumo wrestler
  - Craig Brown, Scottish footballer, manager (d. 2023)
  - Abdul Razzak Ahmed, Iraqi football player
  - Wathiq Naji, Iraqi football manager (d. 2014)
- July 2
  - Ruriko Asaoka, Japanese actress
  - Joshua Bryant, American actor, director, author and speaker (d. 2024)
- July 3
  - Lamar Alexander, American politician
  - Fontella Bass, African-American soul singer ("Rescue Me") (d. 2012)
  - Jerzy Buzek, Polish politician, 8th Prime Minister of Poland
  - Michael Cole, American actor ("The Mod Squad") (d. 2024)
  - Jose Alberto Laboy, Puerto Rican Major League Baseball player
  - Lance Larson, American competition swimmer, Olympic champion and world record-holder in four events
  - Chuck Sieminski, American football player (d. 2020)
  - César Tovar, Venezuelan baseball player (d. 1994)
  - Mario Zanin, Italian cyclist
- July 4
  - Deidre Catt, English tennis player
  - Nasser Madani, Iranian fencer
  - Gene McDowell, American college football coach (d. 2021)
  - Pat Stapleton, Canadian ice hockey player (d. 2020)
- July 5
  - James Herbert Brennan, Irish author (d. 2024)
  - Chuck Close, American painter and photographer (d. 2021)
  - Reiko Kusamura, Japanese actress
- July 6
  - Nursultan Nazarbayev, 1st President of Kazakhstan
  - Siti Norma Yaakob, Malaysian lawyer and judge
- July 7
  - Lee Keun-hak, North Korean football player
  - Sir Ringo Starr, English musician, singer, songwriter and actor (The Beatles)
  - Irène Sweyd, Belgian swimmer
- July 10 – Tommy Troelsen, Danish footballer, manager and television presenter (d. 2021)
- July 13
  - Paul Prudhomme, American celebrity chef, cookbook author (d. 2015)
  - Sir Patrick Stewart, English actor (Star Trek: The Next Generation) (d. 2026)
- July 15 – Johnny Seay, American country music singer (d. 2016)
- July 17 – Francisco Toledo, Mexican painter, sculptor and graphic artist (d. 2019)
- July 18
  - James Brolin, American actor, director
  - Peter Mutharika, 5th President of Malawi
  - Joe Torre, American baseball player, manager and executive
- July 19
  - Hanako, Princess Hitachi
  - Vikki Carr, American singer
  - Anzor Kavazashvili, Soviet football goalkeeper
- July 22
  - Prince Sixtus Henry of Bourbon-Parma
  - Alex Trebek, Canadian game show host (Jeopardy!) (d. 2020)
- July 26 – Mary Jo Kopechne, American aide to Ted Kennedy (d. 1969)
- July 27
  - Pina Bausch, German choreographer (d. 2009)
  - Bharati Mukherjee, Indian-born novelist (d. 2017)
- July 29 - Bernard Lafayette, American civil rights movement activist (d. 2026)
- July 30 – Clive Sinclair, English inventor (d. 2021)

=== August ===
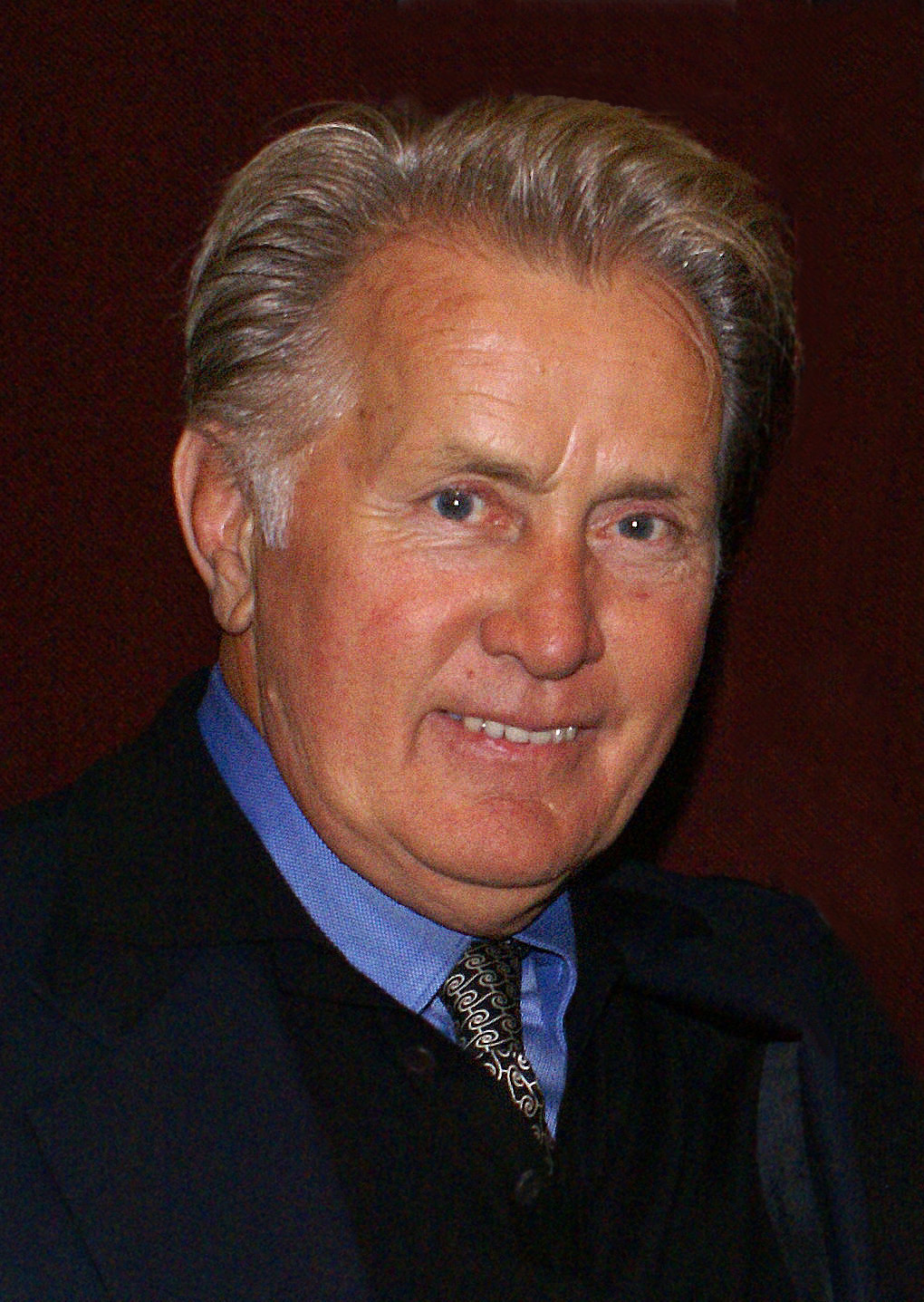
Martin Sheen

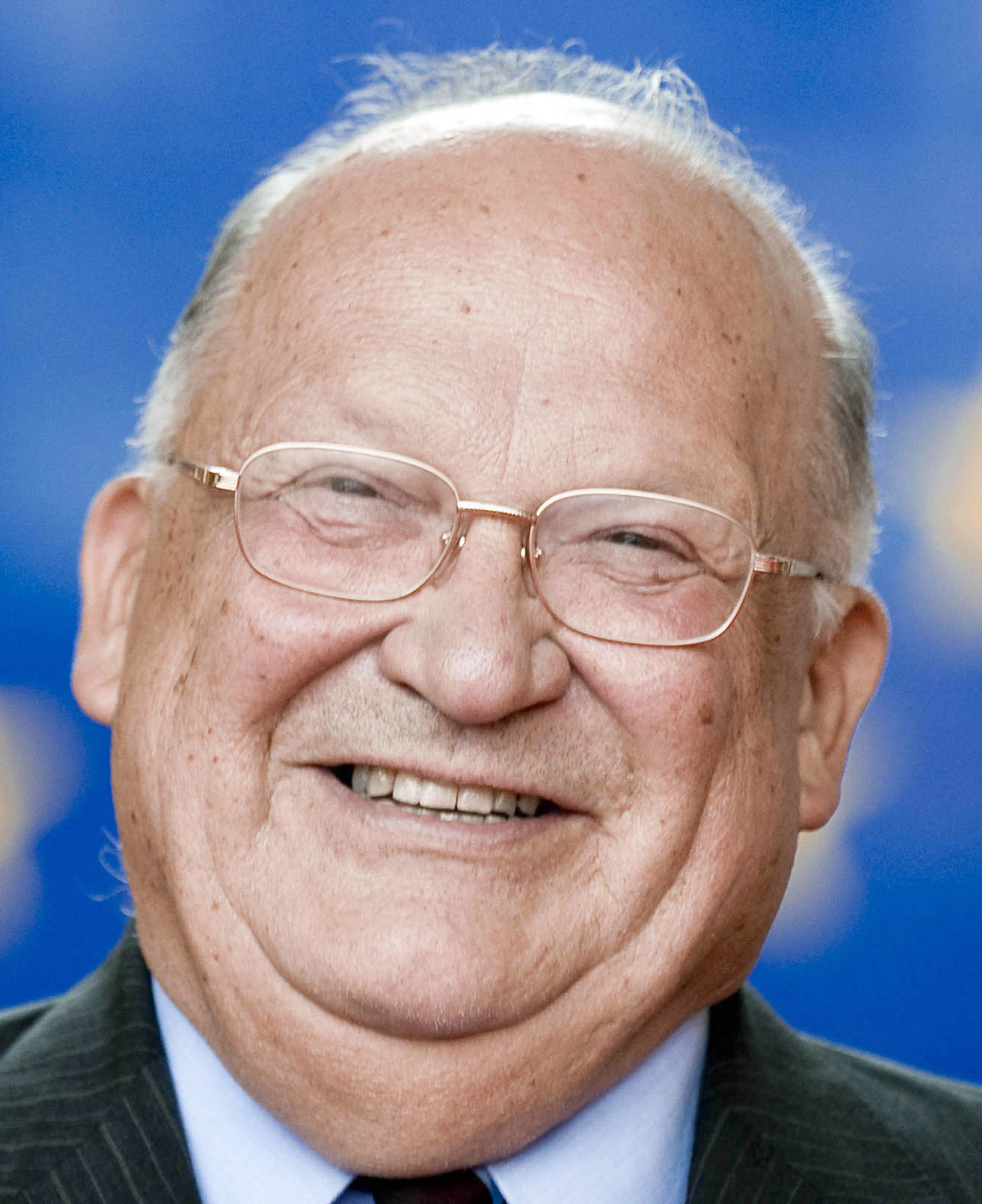
Jean-Luc Dehaene

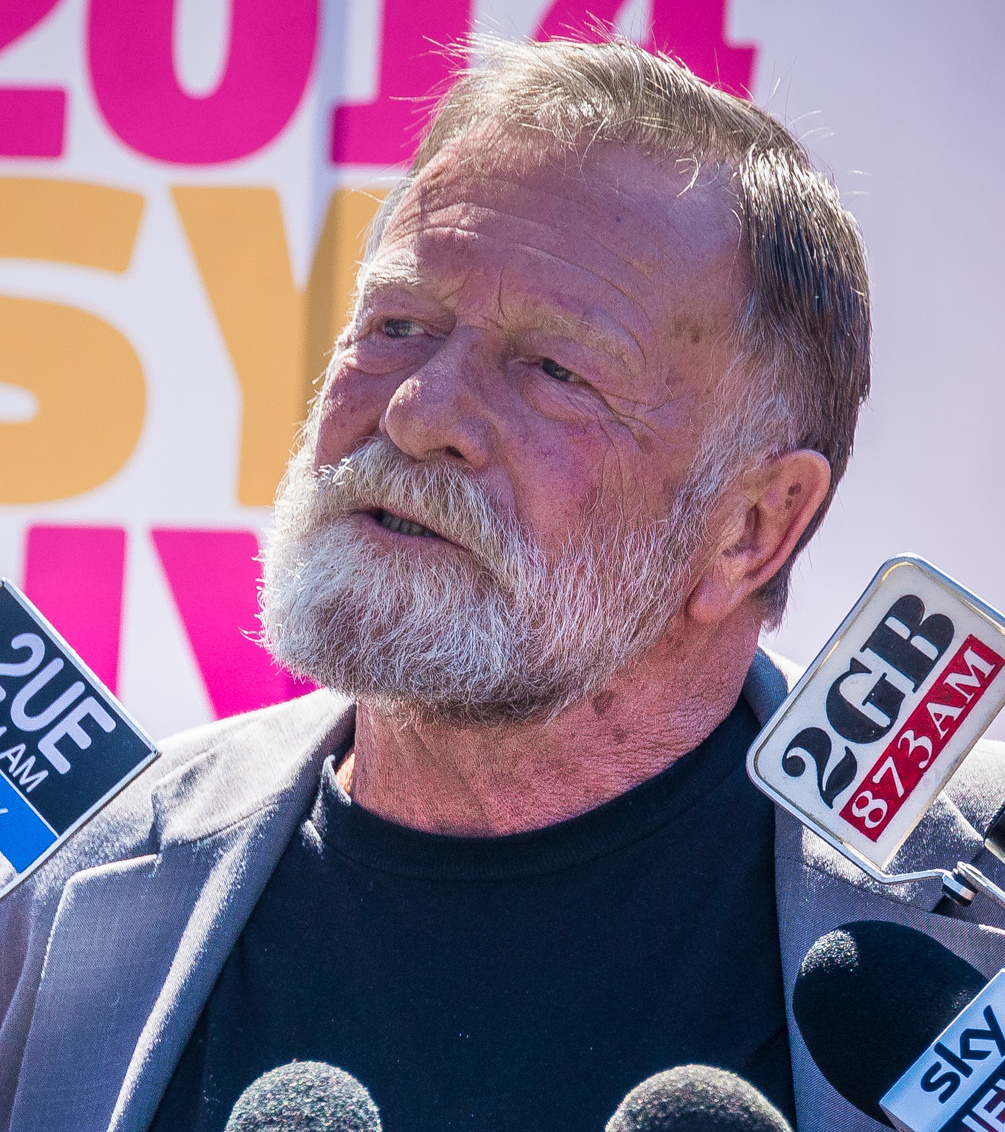
Jack Thompson

- August 1 – Ram Loevy, Israeli screenwriter, director (d. 2025)
- August 3 – Martin Sheen, American actor, father of Charlie Sheen
- August 7
  - Jean-Luc Dehaene, Prime Minister of Belgium (d. 2014)
  - Thomas Barlow, American politician (d. 2017)
- August 8 – Dilip Sardesai, Indian cricketer (d. 2007)
- August 10 – Bobby Hatfield, American singer (The Righteous Brothers) (d. 2003)
- August 12 – Tony Allen, Nigerian Afrobeat drummer (d. 2020)
- August 13
  - Dirk Sager, German journalist (d. 2014)
  - Tony Cloninger, American baseball player (d. 2018)
- August 14
  - Galen Hall, American football coach
  - Max Schautzer, Austrian-born German radio, television presenter
- August 17 – Joseph Pairin Kitingan, Malaysian politician, Chief Minister Of Sabah
- August 19
  - Johnny Nash, American singer-songwriter (d. 2020)
  - Jill St. John, American actress
- August 20
  - Musa Geshaev, Chechen poet, historian (d. 2014)
  - Rajendra K. Pachauri, Indian scientist (d. 2020)
  - John Waller, English historical European martial arts (HEMA) revival pioneer and fight director (d. 2018)
- August 23
  - Tom Baker, American actor (d. 1982)
  - Maria Teresa Fontela Goulart, First Lady of Brazil
  - Thomas A. Steitz, American biochemist (d. 2018)
- August 25 – José van Dam, Belgian bass-baritone (d. 2026)
- August 26 – Michel Micombero, 1st President of Burundi (d. 1983)
- August 28 – Joseph Shabalala, South African choral director (Ladysmith Black Mambazo) (d. 2020)
- August 29 – Wim Ruska, Dutch wrestler, martial artist (d. 2015)
- August 31 – Jack Thompson, Australian actor

=== September ===
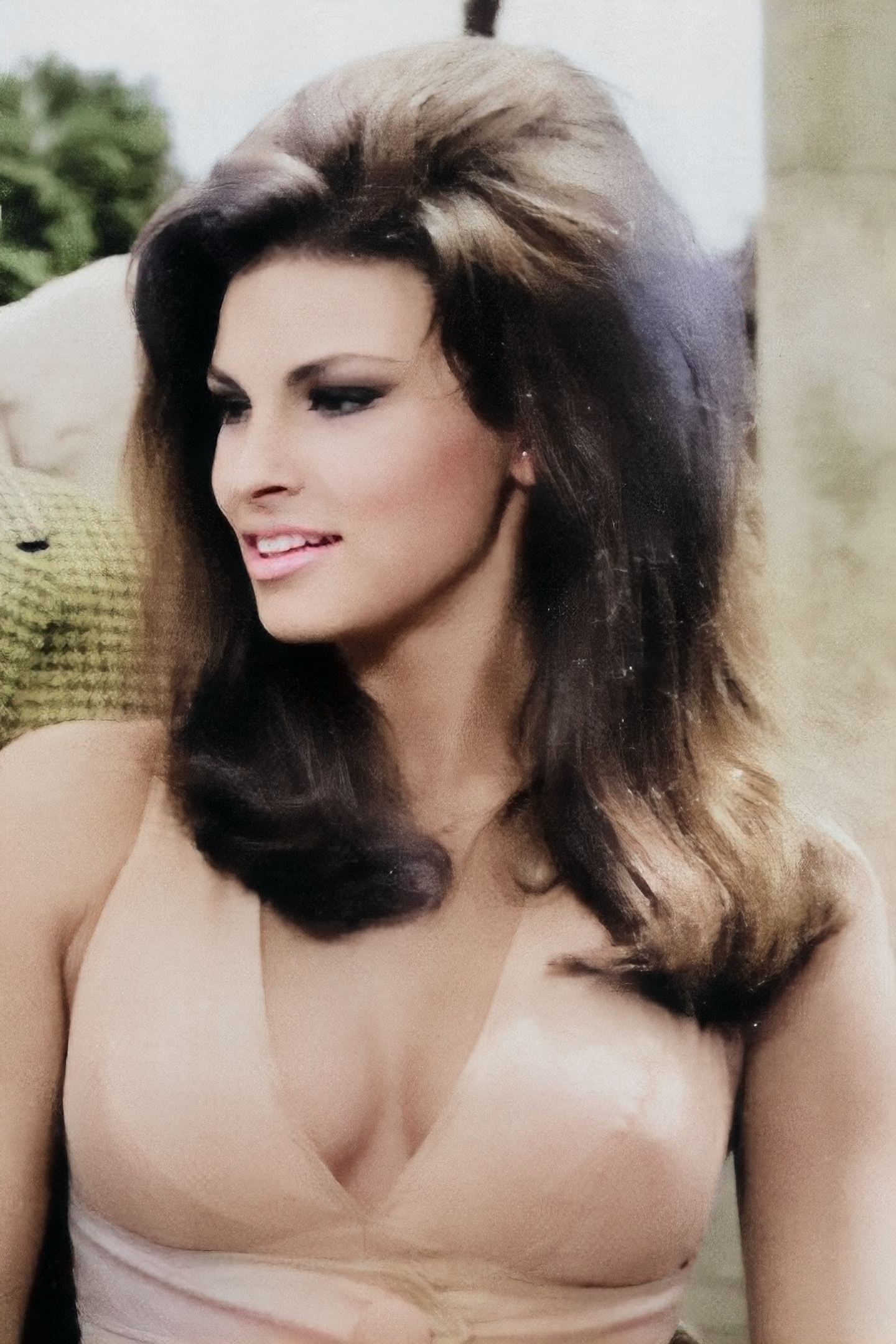
Raquel Welch

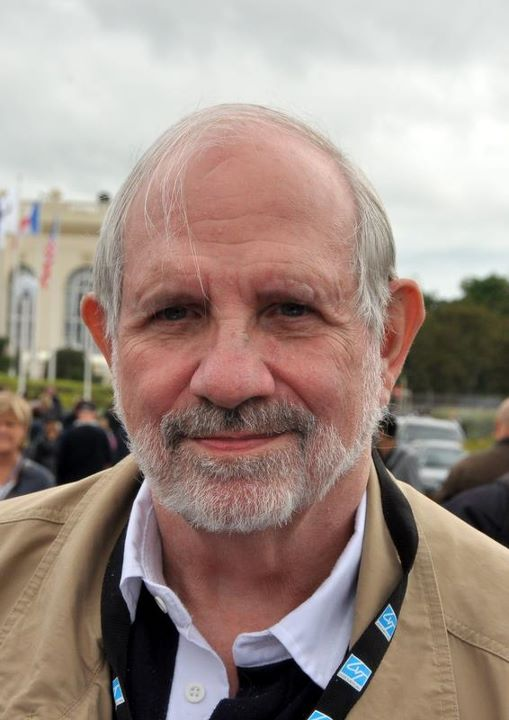
Brian De Palma

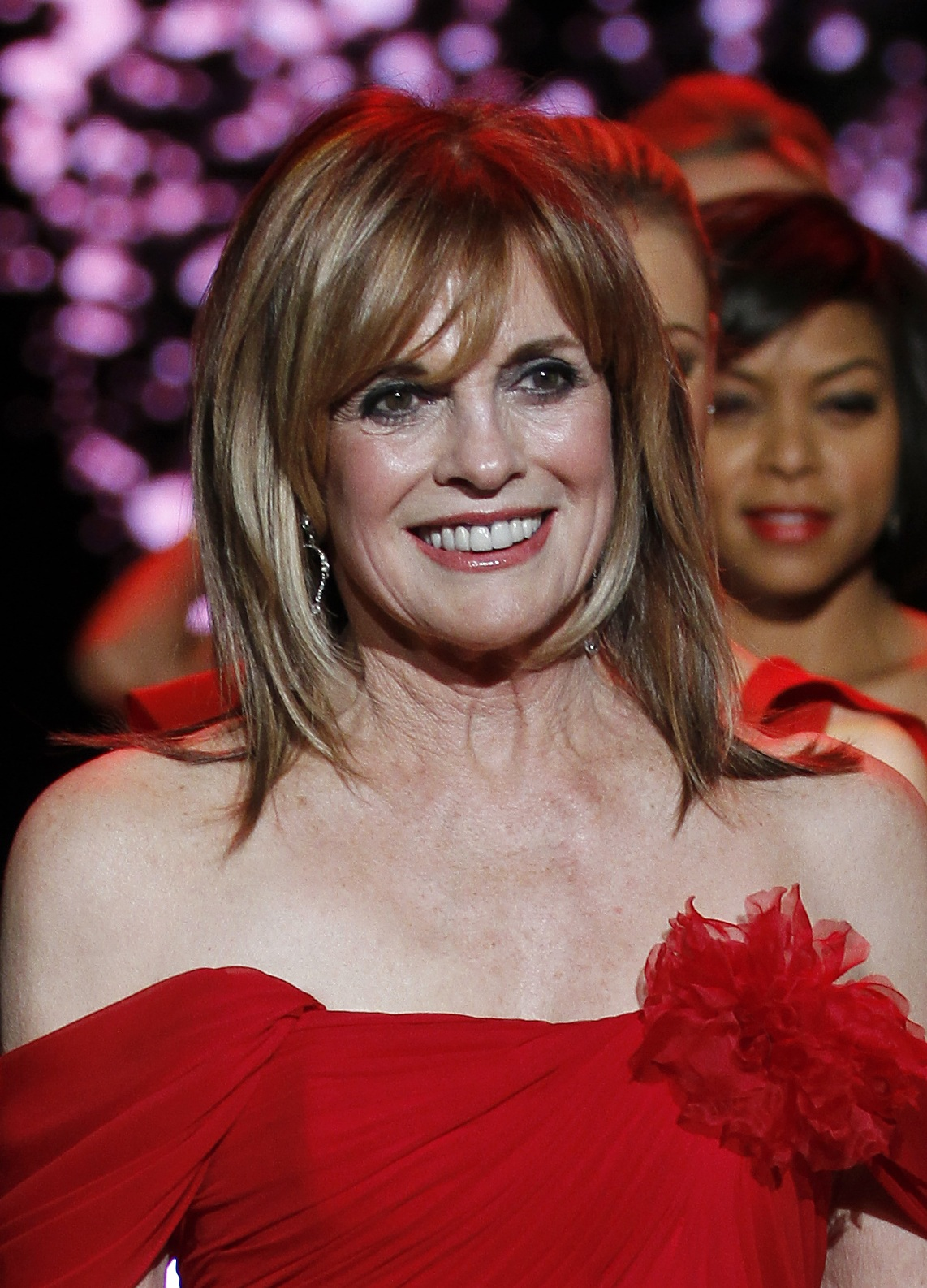
Linda Gray

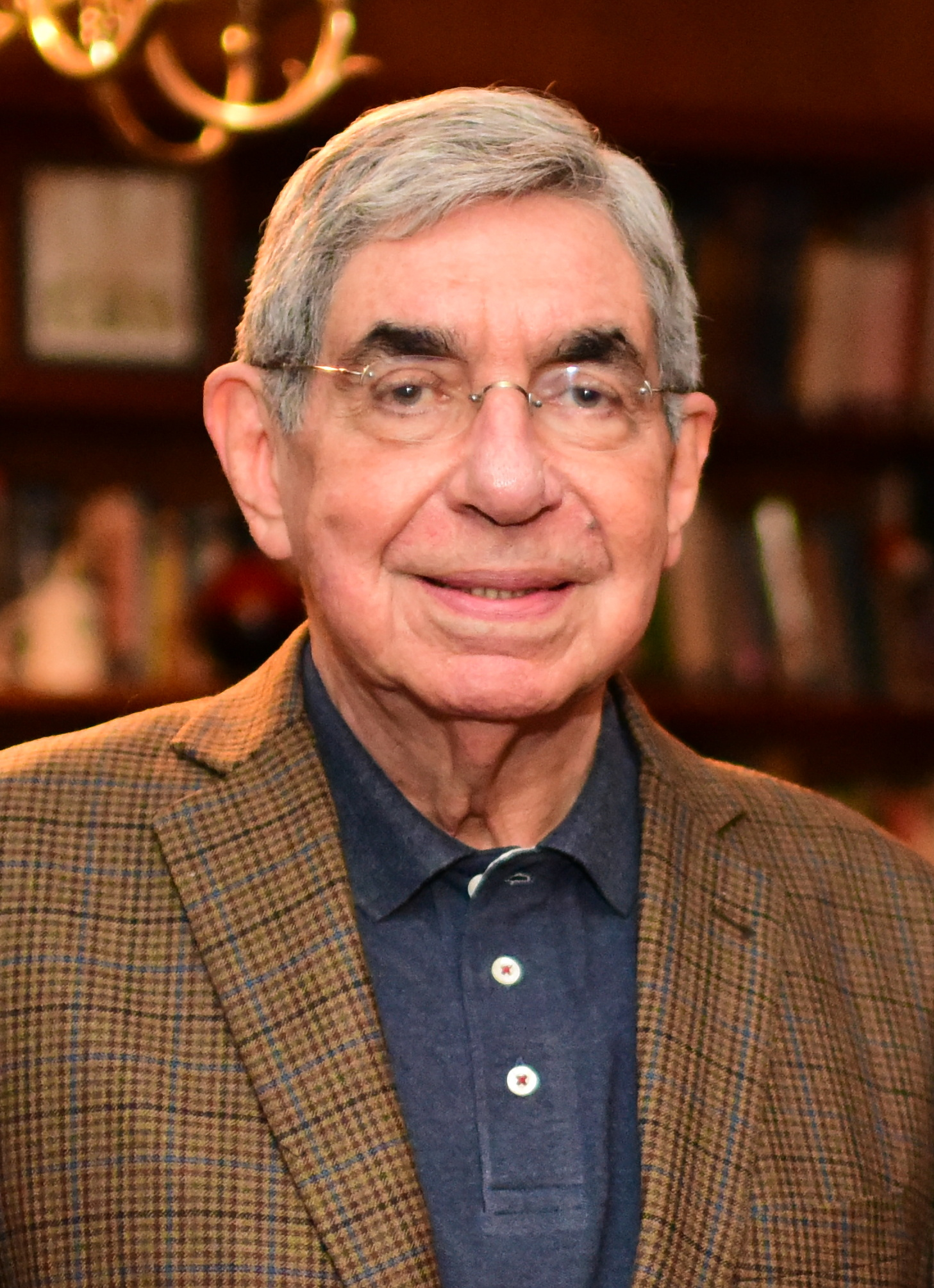
Óscar Arias

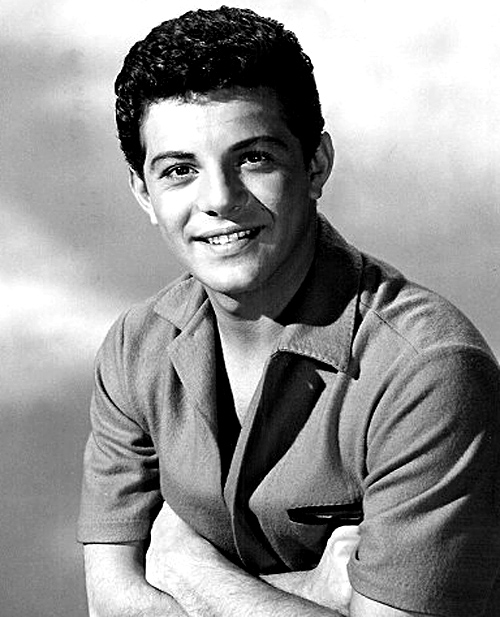
Frankie Avalon

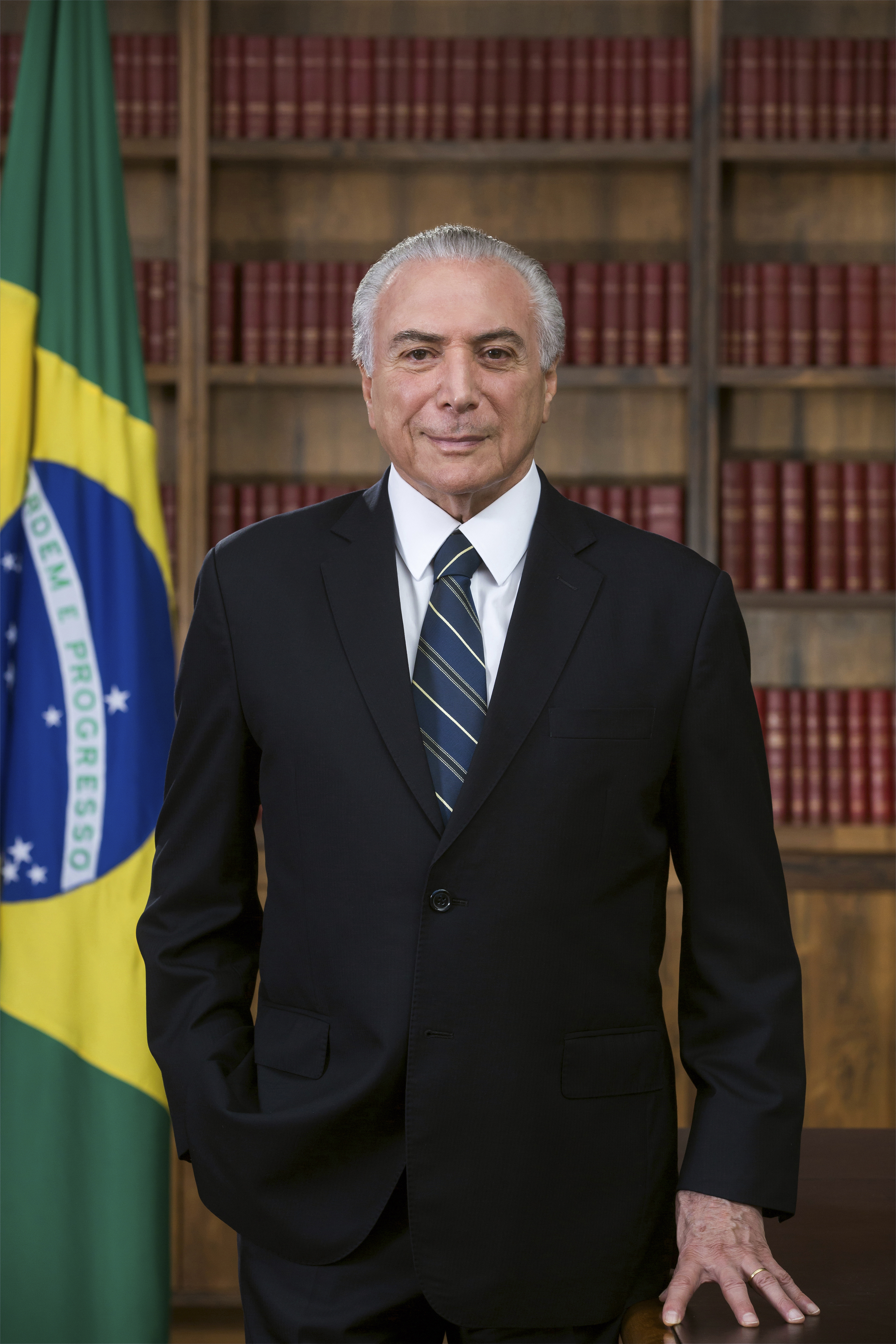
Michel Temer

- September 1
  - Yaşar Büyükanıt, Turkish military officer (d. 2019)
  - Annie Ernaux, French author, Nobel Prize laureate
- September 3
  - Eduardo Galeano, Uruguayan writer (d. 2015)
  - Joseph Warioba, 5th Prime Minister of Tanzania
- September 5 – Raquel Welch, American actress (d. 2023)
- September 6
  - Elwyn Berlekamp, American mathematician (d. 2019)
  - Jackie Trent, English singer-songwriter, actress (d. 2015)
- September 7
  - Dario Argento, Italian filmmaker
  - Abdurrahman Wahid, 4th President of Indonesia (d. 2009)
- September 10
  - Roy Ayers, African-American musician, songwriter (d. 2025)
  - Kim En Jong, Korean Dominican monk and painter
- September 11
  - Brian De Palma, American film director
  - Ajit Singh, Indian-born economist (d. 2015)
- September 12
  - Joachim Frank, German-born biophysicist, Nobel Prize laureate
  - Linda Gray, American model, actress (Dallas)
- September 13 – Óscar Arias, Costa Rican politician, twice President of Costa Rica, Nobel Peace Prize laureate
- September 14
  - Larry Brown, American basketball player, coach
  - Barbara Greenwood, Canadian educator and children's author
- September 18 – Frankie Avalon, American singer and actor
- September 19 – Paul Williams, American songwriter, singer and actor
- September 20 – Tarō Asō, 59th Prime Minister of Japan
- September 22 – Anna Karina, Danish-French actress (d. 2019)
- September 23
  - Mohammad-Reza Shajarian, Iranian traditional singer (d. 2020)
  - Michel Temer, Brazilian politician, President of Brazil between 2016 and 2018.
- September 24 – Michiko Suganuma, Urushi Japanese lacquer artist
- September 27 – Mishal Al-Ahmad Al-Jaber Al-Sabah, emir of Kuwait

=== October ===
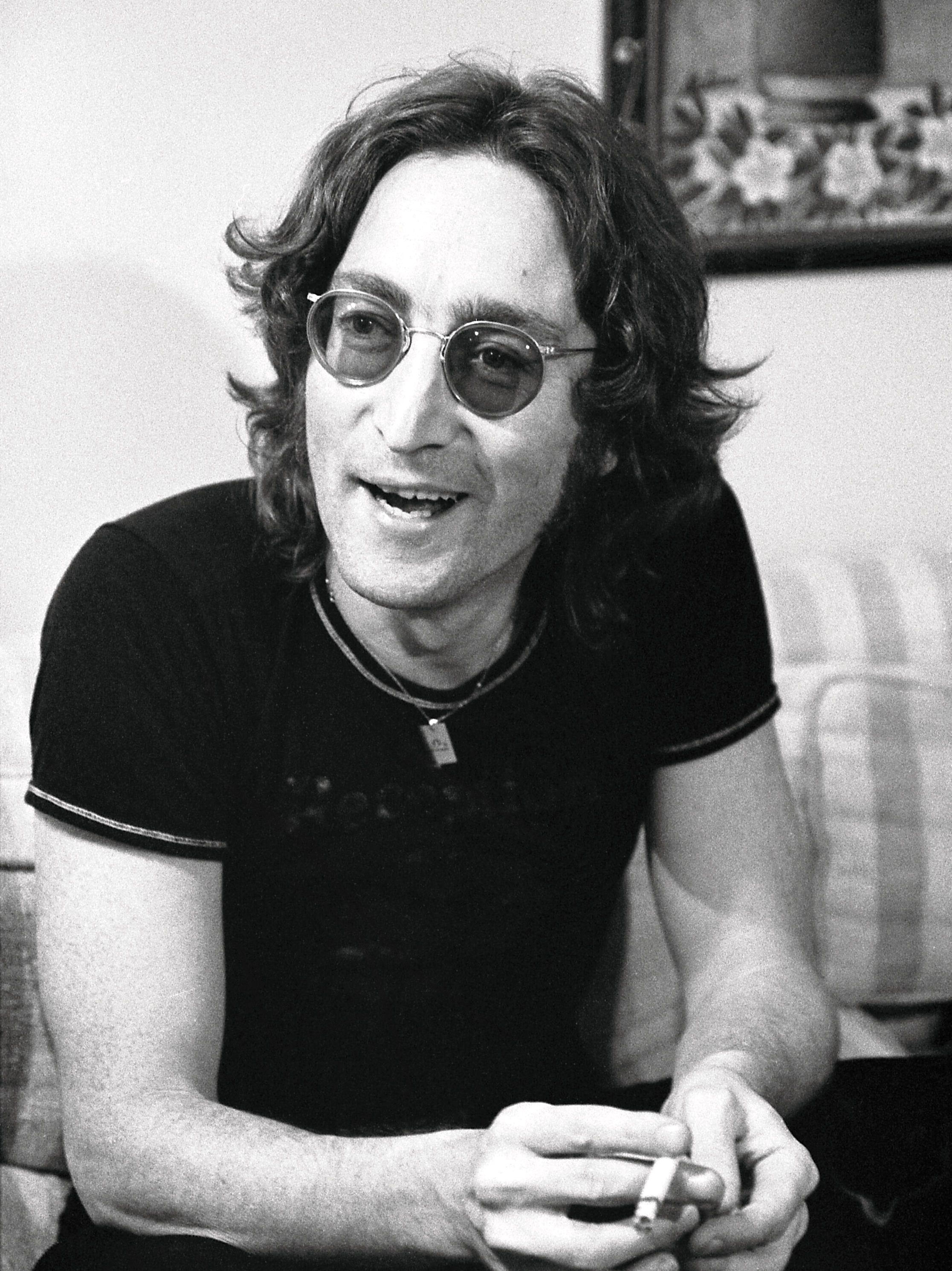
John Lennon

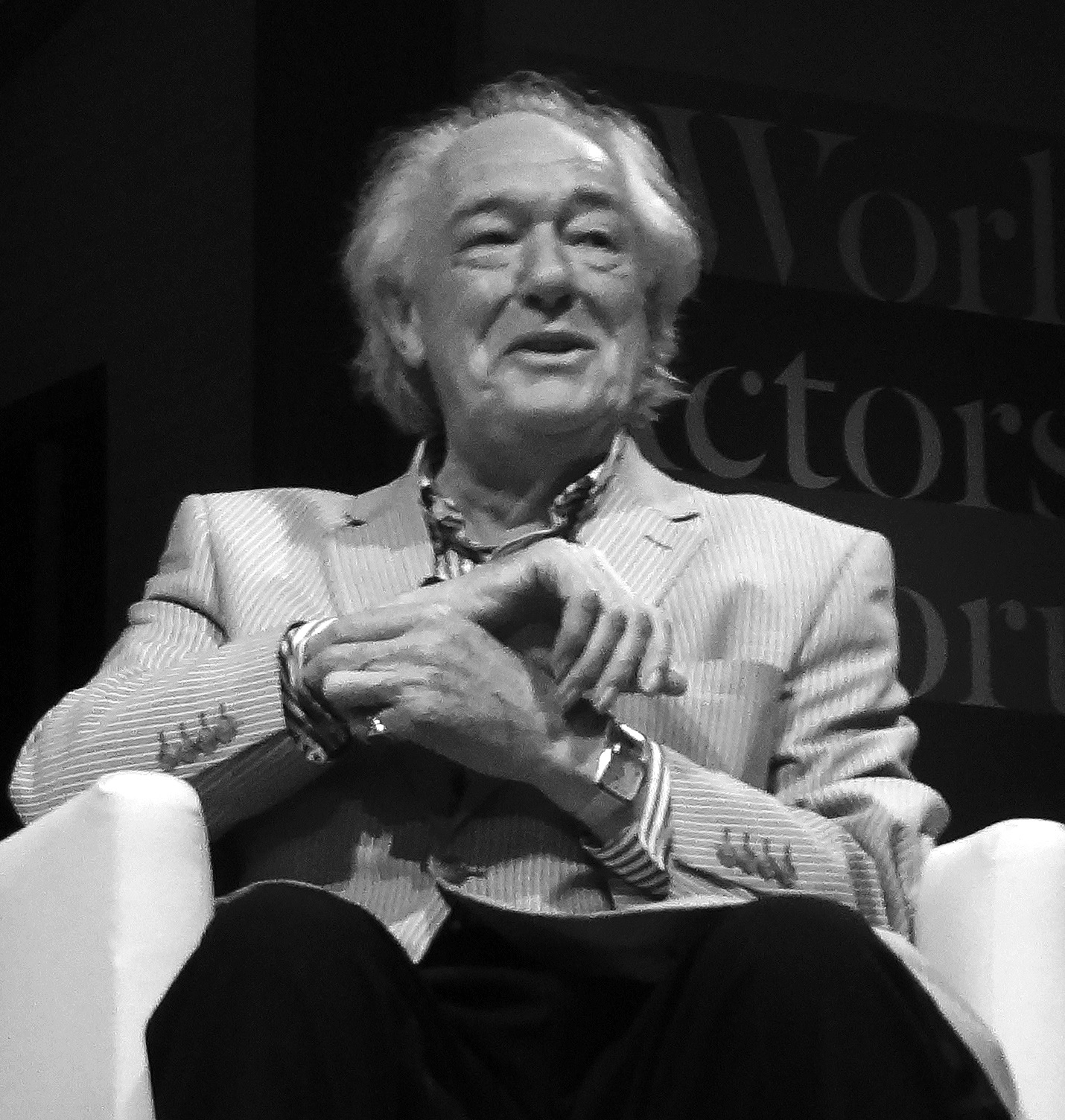
Sir Michael Gambon

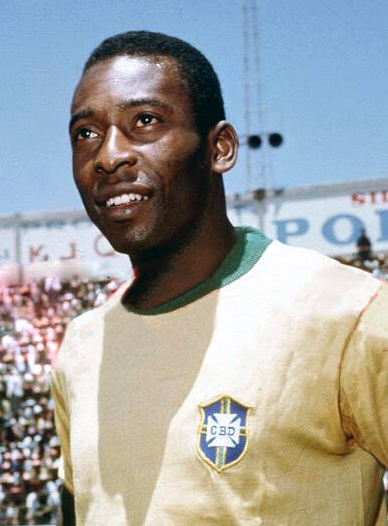
Pelé

- October 1
  - Chris Pattikawa, Indonesian film director and producer (d. 2020)
  - Jean-Luc Bideau, Swiss actor
- October 3 – Mike Troy, American swimmer (d. 2019)
- October 4 – Ian Kiernan, Australian yachtsman (d. 2018)
- October 5 – Milena Dravić, Serbian actress (d. 2018)
- October 6 – John Warnock, American computer scientist, co-founded Adobe Inc. (d. 2023)
- October 9 – John Lennon, English musician, singer-songwriter (The Beatles) (d. 1980)
- October 13 – Pharoah Sanders, American saxophonist (d. 2022)
- October 14 – Cliff Richard, British pop musician, actor and philanthropist
- October 15 – Peter Doherty, Australian immunologist, recipient of the Nobel Prize in Physiology or Medicine
- October 16
  - Barry Corbin, American actor
  - Dave DeBusschere, American basketball player and coach, baseball player (d. 2003)
- October 17 – Peter Stringfellow, English businessman, nightclub owner (d. 2018)
- October 18 – Győző Kulcsár, Hungarian fencer (d. 2018)
- October 19 – Sir Michael Gambon, British-Irish actor (d. 2023)
- October 20 – Robert Pinsky, American poet, essayist, literary critic and translator, United States Poet Laureate
- October 21
  - Geoffrey Boycott, English cricketer
  - Manfred Mann, South African rock musician
  - Marita Petersen, 8th Prime Minister of Faroe Islands (d. 2001)
- October 23 – Pelé, Brazilian footballer (d. 2022)
- October 24 – Yossi Sarid, Israeli politician (d. 2015)
- October 25 – Apolo Nsibambi, Ugandan politician, 8th Prime Minister of Uganda (d. 2019)
- October 29
  - Frida Boccara, French singer (d. 1996)
  - Princess Lalla Nuzha, princess of Morocco (d. 1977)
- October 30 – Hidetoshi Nagasawa, Japanese sculptor, architect (d. 2018)

=== November ===
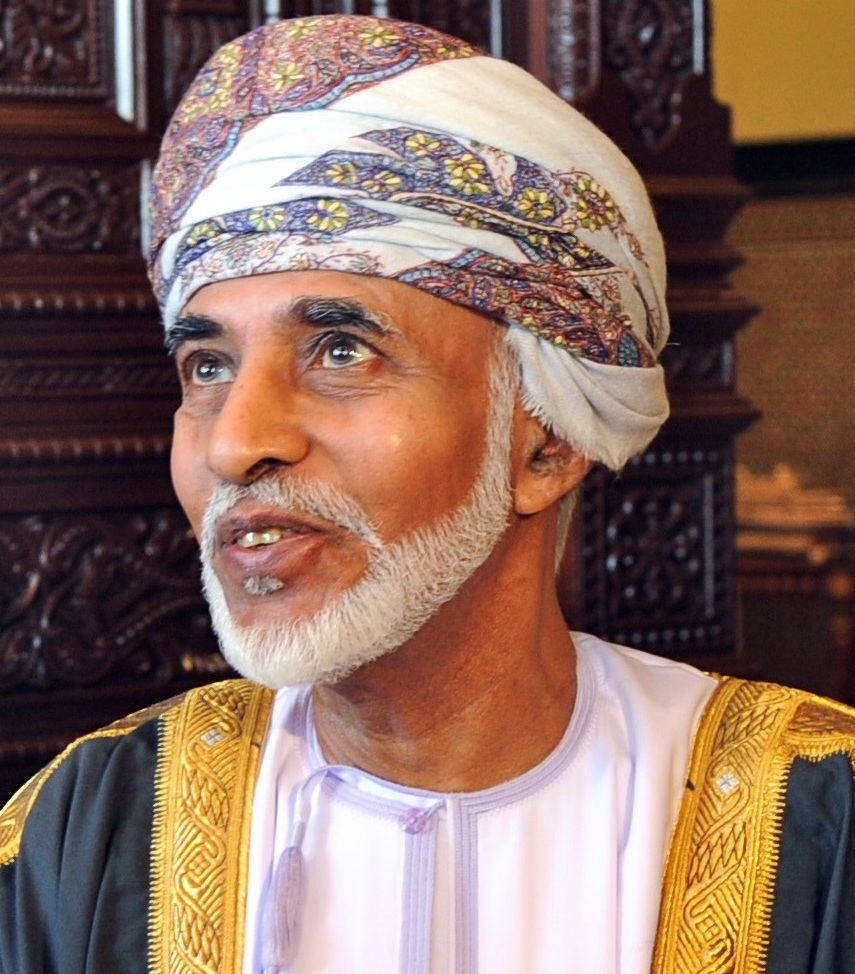
Qaboos bin Said

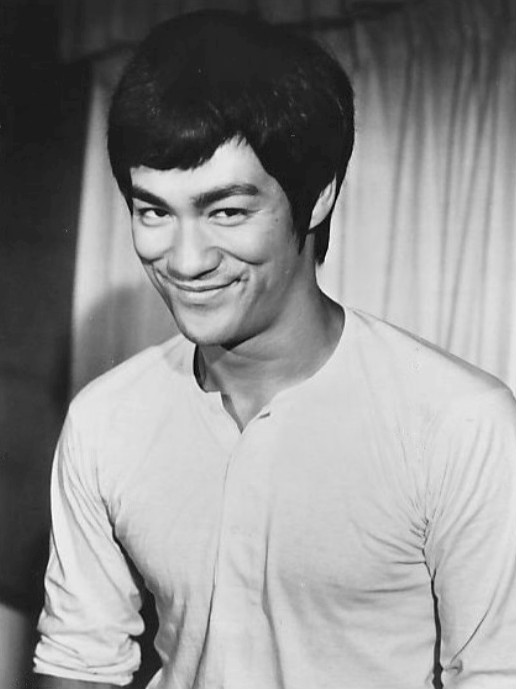
Bruce Lee

- November 5 – Jaime Roldós Aguilera, 33rd President of Ecuador (1979–1981) (d. 1981)
- November 15
  - Wolf Biermann, German singer, songwriter and East German dissident
  - Roberto Cavalli, Italian designer (d. 2024)
  - Sam Waterston, American actor
- November 17 – Luke Kelly, Irish ballad singer (d. 1984)
- November 18 – Qaboos bin Said, Sultan of Oman (d. 2020)
- November 20 – Helma Sanders-Brahms, German film director (d. 2014)
- November 22
  - Alberto Fouilloux, Chilean footballer (d. 2018)
  - Terry Gilliam, American-born British screenwriter, director and animator
  - Andrzej Żuławski, Polish film director, writer (d. 2016)
- November 27 – Bruce Lee, Chinese-American martial artist, actor (d. 1973)
- November 29 – Chuck Mangione, American flugelhorn player (d. 2025)

=== December ===
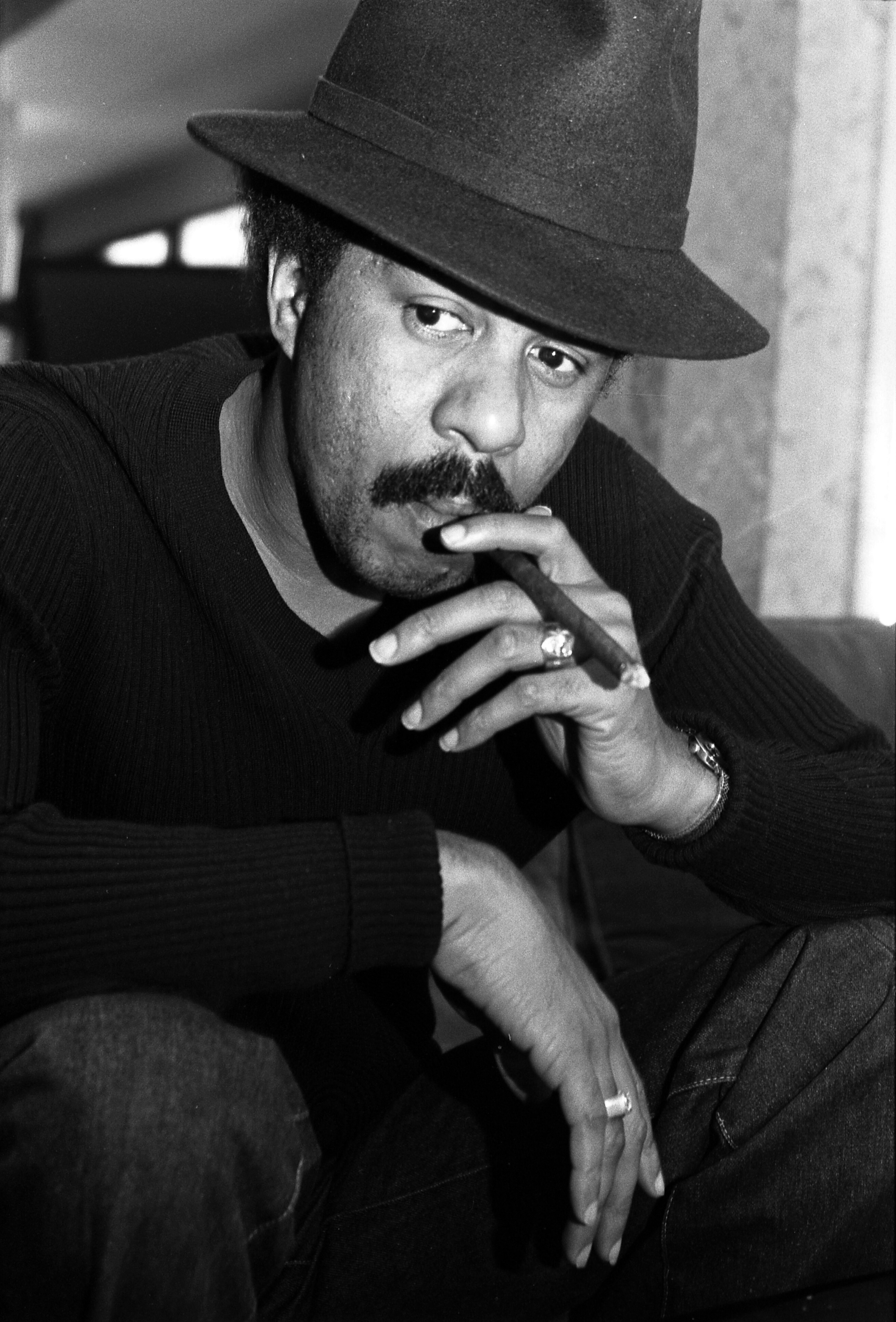
Richard Pryor

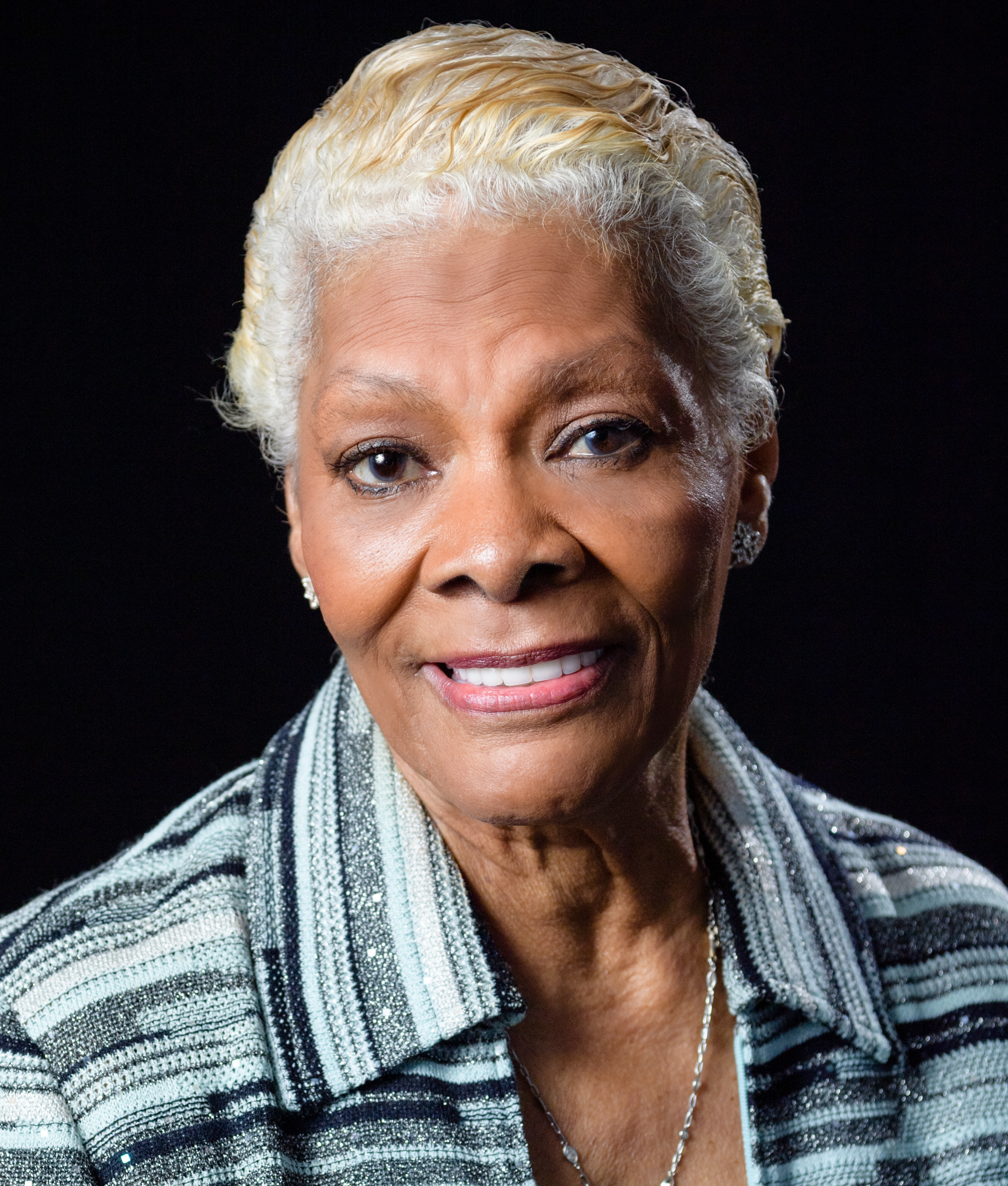
Dionne Warwick

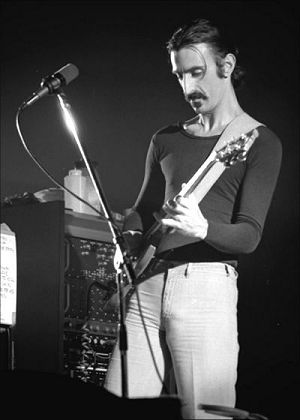
Frank Zappa

- December 1
  - Richard Pryor, American stand-up comedian, actor and writer (d. 2005)
  - Mário da Graça Machungo, 1st Prime Minister of Mozambique (d. 2020)
- December 2 – Connie Booth, British actress
- December 4 – Gary Gilmore, American murderer (d. 1977)
- December 11
  - David Gates, American singer-songwriter (Bread)
  - Donna Mills, American actress
- December 12
  - Sharad Pawar, Indian politician
  - Dionne Warwick, African-American singer and actress
- December 19 – Phil Ochs, American protest singer (d. 1976)
- December 21 – Frank Zappa, American musician, composer and satirist (d. 1993)
- December 23
  - Mamnoon Hussain, 12th President of Pakistan (d. 2021)
  - Jorma Kaukonen, American musician (Jefferson Airplane)
- December 24
  - Janet Carroll, American actress, singer (d. 2012)
  - Anthony S. Fauci, American immunologist
  - Jan Stráský, 20th Prime Minister of Czechoslovakia (d. 2019)
- December 25 – Alija Behmen, Bosnian politician (d. 2018)
- December 26 – Edward C. Prescott, American economist, Nobel Prize laureate (d. 2022)
- December 29
  - Fred Hansen, American Olympic athlete
  - Brigitte Kronauer, German novelist (d. 2019)
- December 30
  - James Burrows, American television director
  - Philippe Cousteau, French diver and cinematographer (d. 1979)

== Deaths ==
=== January ===
- January 1 – Fusajiro Yamauchi, Japanese business executive (b. 1868)
- January 4 – Flora Finch, English-born actress, comedian (b. 1867)
- January 9 – Alex Bennett, Scottish footballer (b. 1881)
- January 15 – Kallirhoe Parren, founder of the Greek women's movement (b. 1861)
- January 18 – Kazimierz Przerwa-Tetmajer, Polish poet, writer (b. 1865)
- January 20 – Omar Bundy, U.S. Army general (b. 1861)
- January 22 – Edwin Carewe, Native American director (b. 1883)
- January 27 – Isaac Babel, Ukrainian writer (executed) (b. 1894)
- January 29 – Nedo Nadi, Italian fencer (b. 1894)

=== February ===
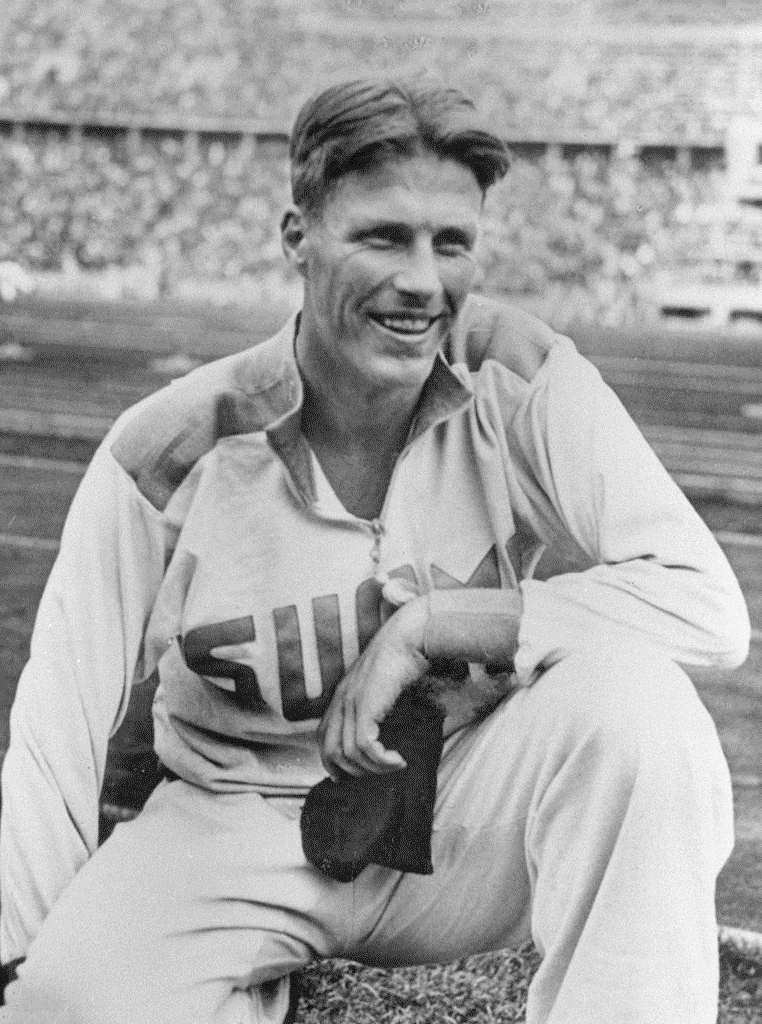
Gunnar Höckert

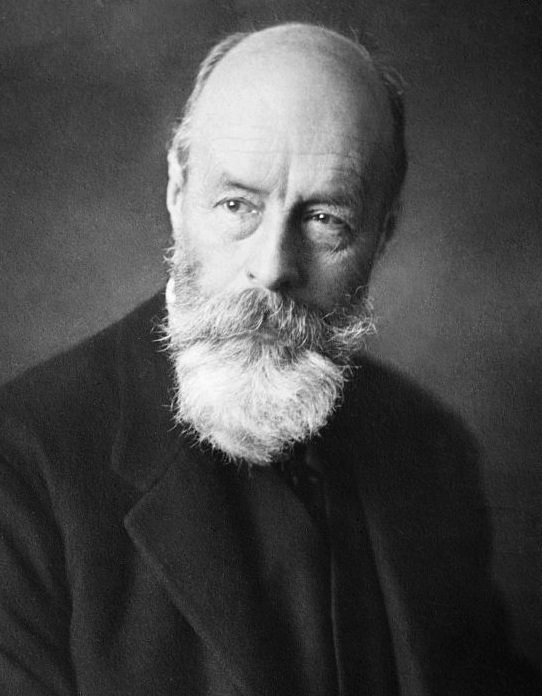
Michael Hainisch

- February – Zheng Pingru, Chinese spy (executed) (b. 1918)
- February 2
  - Mikhail Koltsov, Soviet journalist (executed) (b. 1898)
  - Vsevolod Meyerhold, Russian theatre practitioner (b. 1874)
- February 4 – Nikolai Yezhov, Soviet politician and police chief, Great Purge Perpetrator (b. 1895)
- February 9 – William Dodd, American historian, diplomat (b. 1869)
- February 11
  - John Buchan, 1st Baron Tweedsmuir, Scottish-born novelist, 15th Governor General of Canada (b. 1875)
  - Gunnar Höckert, Finnish Olympic athlete (b. 1910)
- February 15 – R. E. B. Crompton, British electrical engineer, industrialist and inventor (b. 1845)
- February 16 – Louis Dartige du Fournet, French admiral (b. 1856)
- February 26 – Michael Hainisch, 2nd President of Austria (b. 1858)
- February 27 – Peter Behrens, German architect, designer (b. 1868)
- February 29
  - E. F. Benson, English writer (b. 1867)
  - Josef Swickard, German actor (b. 1866)

=== March ===
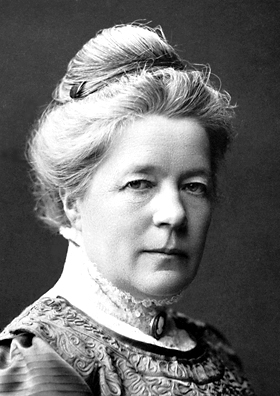
Selma Lagerlöf

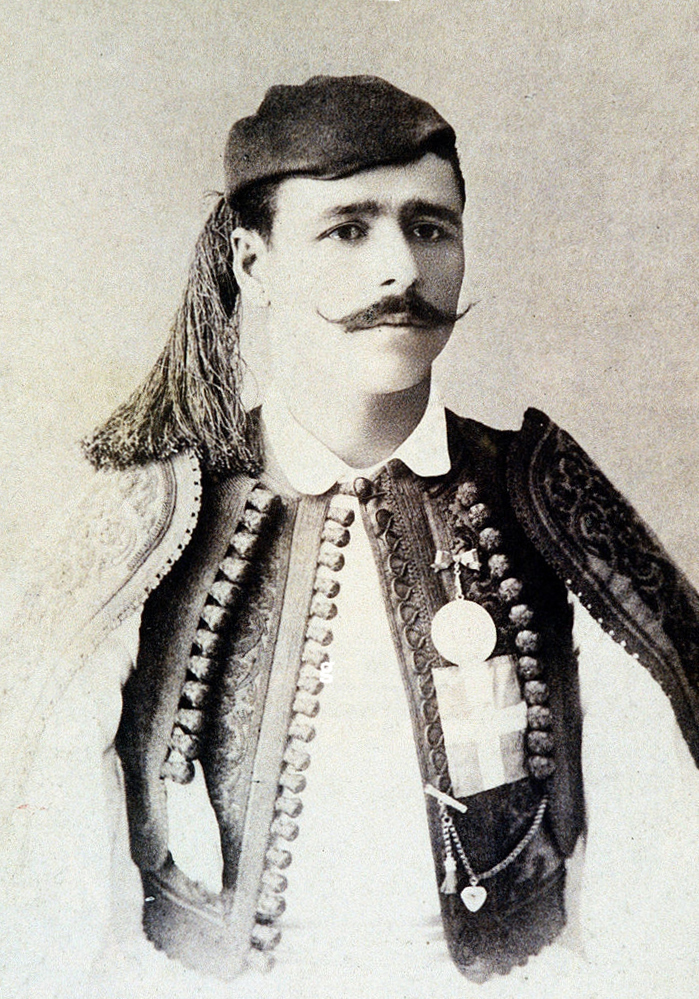
Spyridon Louis

- March 1 – A. H. Tammsaare, Estonian writer (b. 1878)
- March 5
  - Maxine Elliott, American actress (b. 1868)
  - Cai Yuanpei, Chinese educator, philosopher, politician and Esperantist and the president of Peking University (b. 1868)
- March 10 – Mikhail Bulgakov, Russian writer (b. 1891)
- March 16
  - Selma Lagerlöf, Swedish writer, Nobel Prize laureate (b. 1858)
  - Samuel Untermyer, American lawyer (b. 1858)
- March 18 – Sir Aylmer Hunter-Weston, British army general (b. 1864)
- March 20 – Alfred Ploetz, German physician, biologist and eugenicist (b. 1860)
- March 23 – Dimitar Stanchov, 15th Prime Minister of Bulgaria (b. 1863)
- March 24 – Thomas Adams, British urban planner (b. 1871)
- March 26 – Spyridon Louis, Greek Olympic athlete (b. 1873)
- March 27
  - Madeleine Astor, American survivor of the sinking of the RMS Titanic (b. 1893)
  - Michael Joseph Savage, 23rd Prime Minister of New Zealand (b. 1872)
- March 30 – Sir George Egerton, British admiral (b. 1852)
- March 31 – Tinsley Lindley, English footballer (b. 1865)

=== April ===
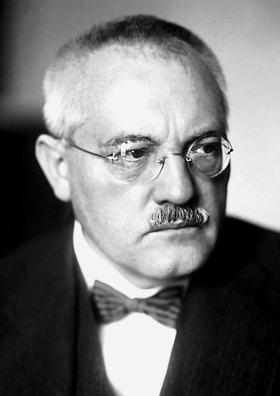
Carl Bosch

- April 1 – J. A. Hobson, English economist (b. 1858)
- April 5
  - Robert Maillart, Swiss civil engineer (b. 1872)
  - Song Zheyuan, Chinese general of the Northwestern Army (b. 1885)
- April 7 – William Faversham, English actor (b. 1868)
- April 8 – Joaquin Mir Trinxet, Spanish artist (b. 1873)
- April 9
  - Mrs. Patrick Campbell, English theatre actress, producer (b. 1865)
  - Henryk Minkiewicz, Polish general and politician (executed) (b. 1880)
- April 10 – Bernard Warburton-Lee, British naval officer, Victoria Cross recipient (killed in action) (b. 1895)
- April 18 – Florrie Forde, Australian-born music hall singer (b. 1875)
- April 21 – George Barnes, British Labour politician (b. 1859)
- April 26 – Carl Bosch, German chemist, Nobel Prize laureate (b. 1874)
- April 28 – Luisa Tetrazzini, Italian opera singer (b. 1871)
- April 30 – Henryk Dobrzański, Polish soldier, sportsman and resistance fighter (b. 1897)

=== May ===
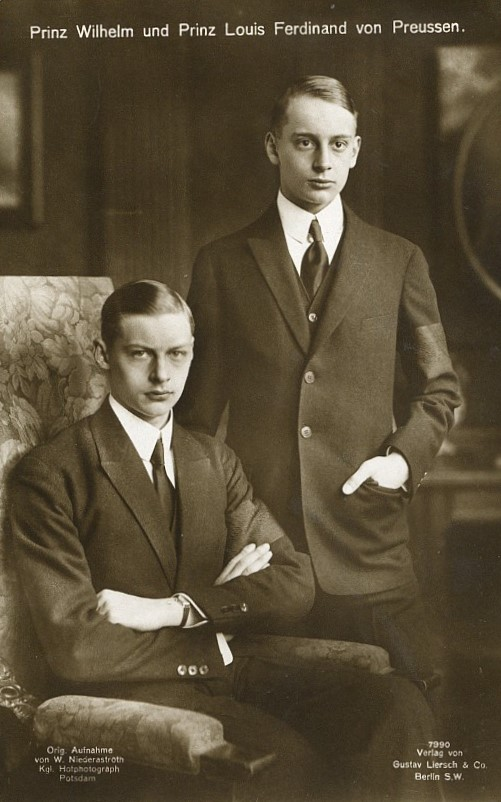
Prince Wilhelm of Prussia

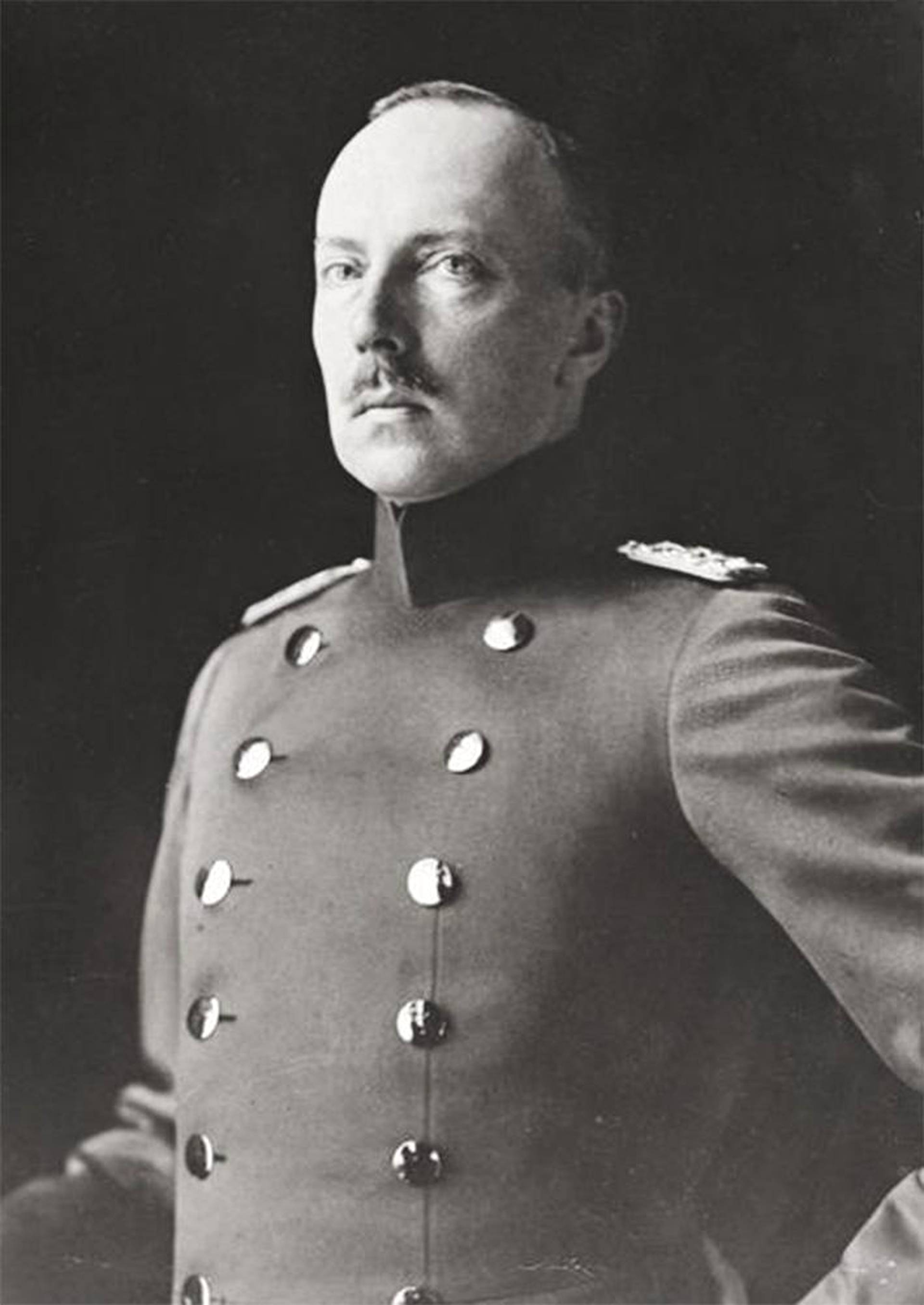
Prince Frederick Charles of Hesse

- May 2 – Ernest Joyce, English explorer (b. 1875)
- May 7 – George Lansbury, British Labour politician (b. 1859)
- May 11 – Chujiro Hayashi, Japanese Reiki Master (b. 1880)
- May 14
  - Emma Goldman, Lithuanian-born anarchist (b. 1869)
  - Menno ter Braak, Dutch writer (b. 1902)
- May 16 – Zhang Zizhong, general of the Chinese National Revolutionary Army (b. 1891)
- May 20 – Verner von Heidenstam, Swedish writer, Nobel Prize laureate (b. 1859)
- May 24 – Louis Fles, Dutch businessman, activist and author (b. 1872)
- May 25 – Joe De Grasse, Canadian film director (b. 1873)
- May 26 – Prince Wilhelm of Prussia (b. 1906)
- May 27 – Bolesław Roja, Polish general (executed) (b. 1876)
- May 28
  - Walter Connolly, American actor (b. 1887)
  - Prince Frederick Charles of Hesse (b. 1868)
- May 29 – Mary Anderson, American stage actress (b. 1859)

=== June ===
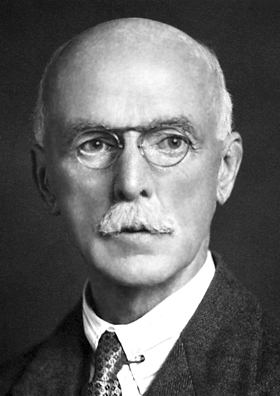
Arthur Harden

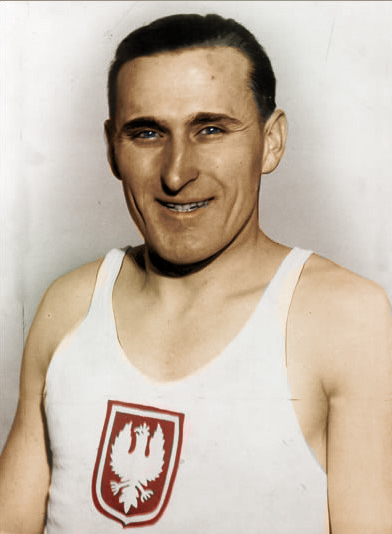
Janusz Kusocinski

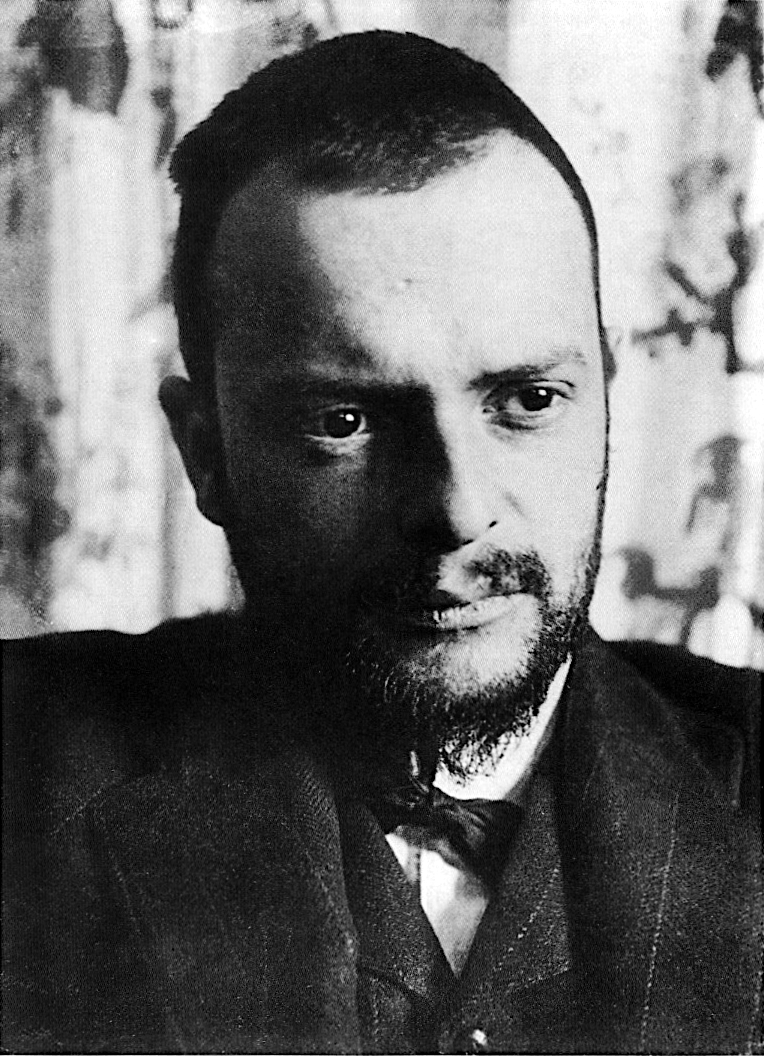
Paul Klee

- June 7
  - James Hall, American actor (b. 1900)
  - Hugh Rodman, American admiral (b. 1859)
- June 10
  - Sir Thomas Hudson Beare, British engineer (b. 1859)
  - Marcus Garvey, Jamaican-born publisher, entrepreneur and black nationalist (b. 1887)
- June 11 – Alfred S. Alschuler, American architect (b. 1876)
- June 12 – William Lashly, English sailor (b. 1867)
- June 14 – Henry W. Antheil Jr., American diplomat (b. 1912)
- June 17 – Sir Arthur Harden, English chemist, Nobel Prize laureate (b. 1865)
- June 19 – Maurice Jaubert, French composer (b. 1900)
- June 20 – Charley Chase, American comedian (b. 1893)
- June 21
  - Smedley Butler, U.S. general (b. 1881)
  - Janusz Kusociński, Polish athlete (killed in action) (b. 1907)
  - John T. Thompson, United States Army officer, inventor of the Thompson gun (b. 1860)
  - Édouard Vuillard, French painter (b. 1868)
- June 22
  - Walter Hasenclever, German poet and playwright (b. 1890)
  - Wladimir Köppen, Russian-born German geographer and climatologist (b. 1846)
- June 28 – Italo Balbo, Italian Fascist leader (b. 1896)
- June 29 – Paul Klee, Swiss artist (b. 1879)

=== July ===
- July 1 – Ben Turpin, American actor, comedian (b. 1869)
- July 9 – Józef Biniszkiewicz, Silesian politician (b. 1875)
- July 10 – Pietro Frugoni, Italian general (b. 1851)
- July 15 – Robert Wadlow, American citizen, tallest man ever (infection) (b. 1918)
- July 28 – David W. Taylor, American naval architect (b. 1864)
- July 30 – Spencer S. Wood, United States Navy Rear Admiral (b. 1861)

=== August ===
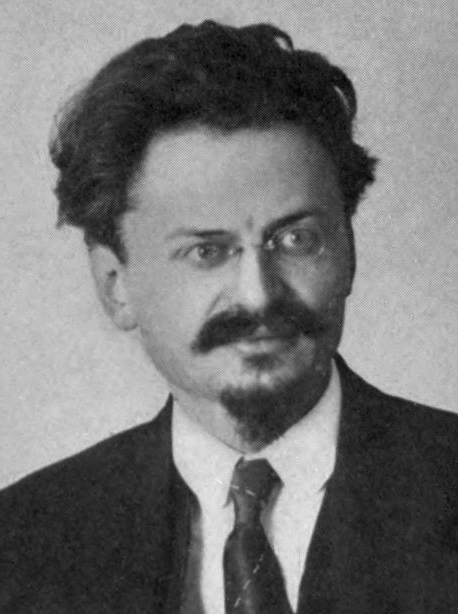
Leon Trotsky

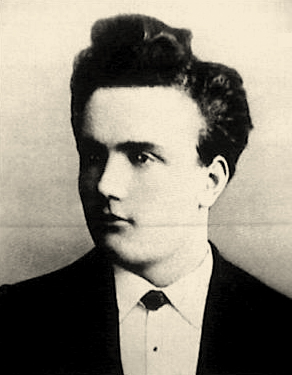
Paul Nipkow

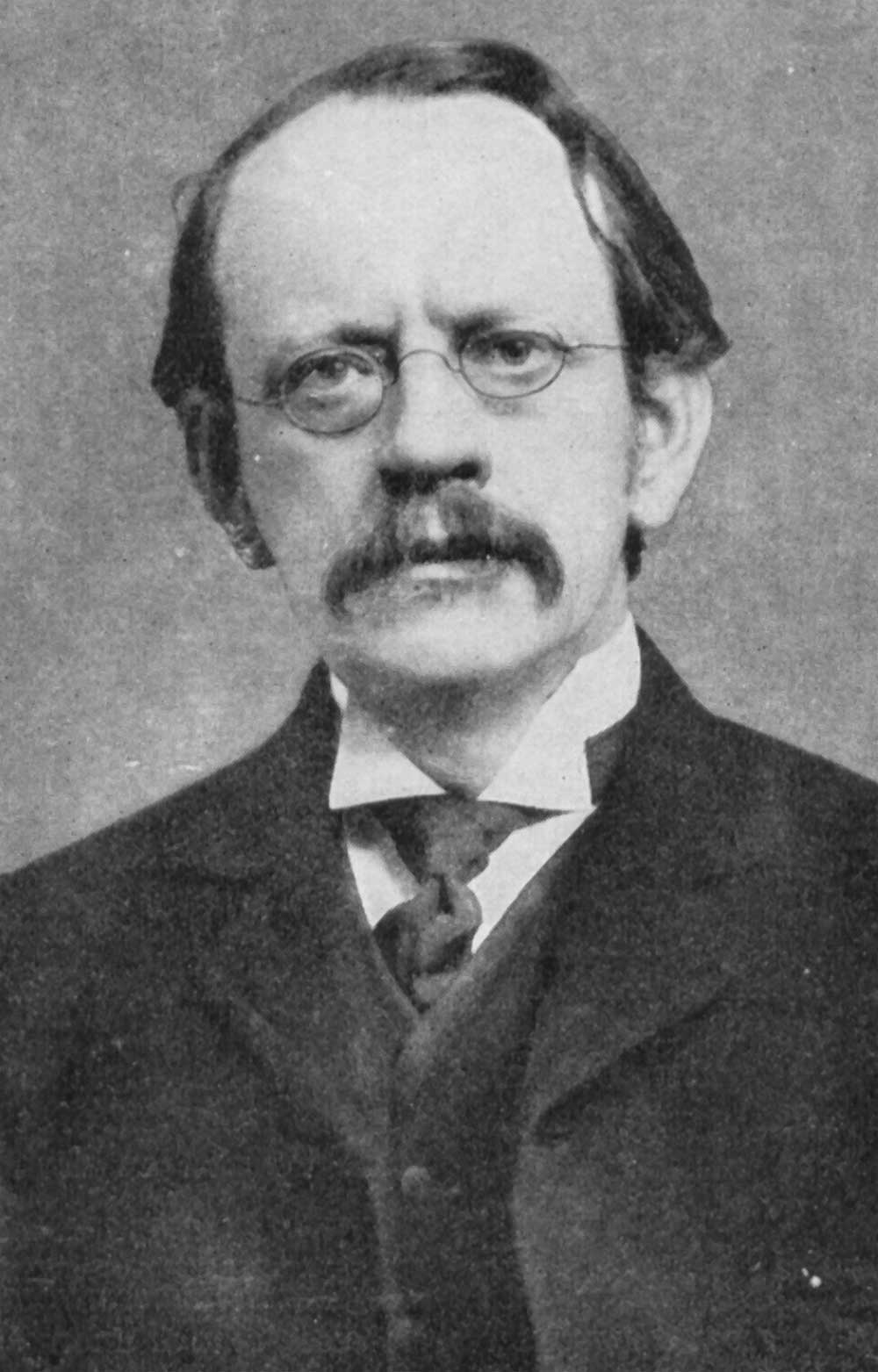
J. J. Thomson

- August 1 – Temulji Bhicaji Nariman, Indian physician and obstetrician (b. 1848)
- August 3
  - Ze'ev Jabotinsky, Russian Zionist philosopher and intellectual (b. 1880)
  - Krishna Raja Wadiyar IV, Indian royal, Maharajah of Mysore (b. 1884)
- August 4 – Joaquina Maria Mercedes Barcelo Pages, Filipino Roman Catholic nun and venerable (b. 1857)
- August 5 – Frederick Cook, American explorer (b. 1865)
- August 8 – Johnny Dodds, American jazz clarinetist (b. 1892)
- August 13
  - James Fairbairn, Australian pastoralist, aviator and politician (b. 1897)
  - Sir Henry Gullett, Australian politician (b. 1878)
  - Geoffrey Street, Australian politician (b. 1894)
  - Sir Brudenell White, Australian general (b. 1876)
- August 16 – Henri Desgrange, French racing cyclist and founder of the Tour de France (b. 1865)
- August 18 – Walter Chrysler, American automobile pioneer (b. 1875)
- August 21 – Leon Trotsky, Russian communist revolutionary (assassinated) (b. 1879)
- August 22
  - Sir Oliver Lodge, British physicist (b. 1851)
  - Gerald Strickland, 1st Baron Strickland, Maltese politician, 4th Prime Minister of Malta, 23rd Governor of New South Wales, 15th Governor of Western Australia and 9th Governor of Tasmania (b. 1861)
  - Mary Vaux Walcott, American artist, naturalist (b. 1860)
- August 24 – Paul Gottlieb Nipkow, German technician and inventor (b. 1860)
- August 28 – William Bowie, American geodetic engineer (b. 1872)
- August 30
  - Sir Thomas Snow, British army general (b. 1858)
  - J. J. Thomson, British physicist, Nobel Prize laureate (b. 1856)
- August 31
  - Ernest Lundeen, American lawyer, politician (b. 1878)
  - DeLancey W. Gill, American landscape painter, photographer (b. 1859)

=== September ===
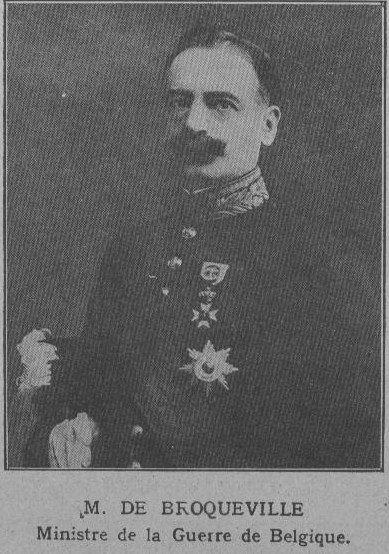
Charles de Broqueville

- September 4 – George William de Carteret, Jerseiaise author (b. 1869)
- September 5 – Charles de Broqueville, 20th Prime Minister of Belgium (b. 1860)
- September 7 – José Félix Estigarribia, 34th President of Paraguay (b. 1888)
- September 9 – Percy Abbott, Australian politician (b. 1869)
- September 10
  - Nikola Ivanov, Bulgarian general (b. 1861)
  - Yamaya Tanin, Japanese admiral (b. 1866)
- September 20 – E. Rosa Sawtell, New Zealand artist (b. 1865)
- September 23
  - Robert Hichens, RMS Titanic quartermaster, man at the wheel when Titanic hit the iceberg (b. 1882)
  - Hale Holden, American president of Chicago, Burlington and Quincy Railroad (1914–1918, 1920–1929) (b. 1869)
- September 25 – Marguerite Clark, American stage and silent film actress (b. 1883)
- September 26 – Walter Benjamin, German philosopher and cultural critic, suicide (b. 1892)
- September 27
  - Julián Besteiro, Spanish socialist politician (b. 1870)
  - Julius Wagner-Jauregg, Austrian neuroscientist, recipient of the Nobel Prize in Physiology or Medicine (b. 1857)

=== October ===
- October 5
  - Ballington Booth, American co-founder of Volunteers of America (b. 1857)
  - Lincoln Loy McCandless, Hawaiian politician, cattle rancher (b. 1859)
  - Silvestre Revueltas, Mexican composer (b. 1899)
- October 6 – Michitarō Komatsubara, Japanese general (b. 1885)
- October 8
  - Robert Emden, Swiss astrophysicist and meteorologist (b. 1862)
  - Sir Henry Head, English neurologist (b. 1861)
- October 9 – Sir Wilfred Grenfell, English medical missionary to Newfoundland and Labrador (b. 1865)
- October 10 – Berton Churchill, Canadian actor (b. 1876)
- October 12 – Tom Mix, American actor (b. 1880)
- October 15 – Lluís Companys, President of the Generalitat of Catalonia (executed) (b. 1882)
- October 17 – George Davis, American baseball player, MLB Hall of Famer (b. 1870)
- October 20 – Gunnar Asplund, Swedish architect (b. 1885)
- October 22 – Sir Charles Harington, British general (b. 1872)

=== November ===
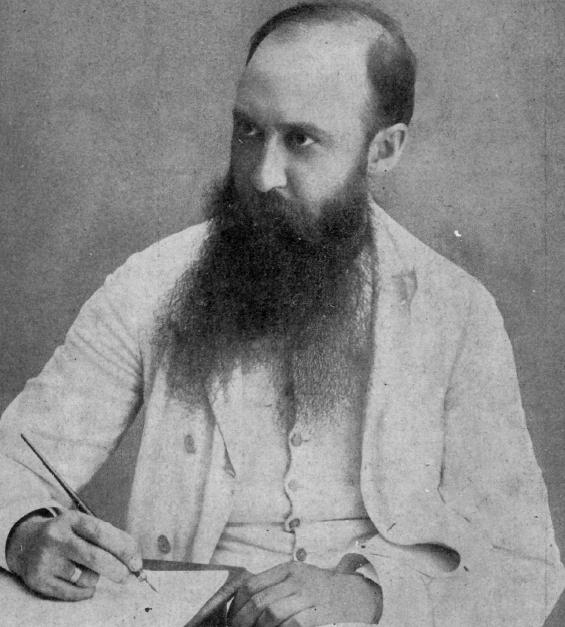
Nicolae Iorga

- November 3 – Manuel Azaña, 55th Prime Minister of Spain, 2nd President of Spain (b. 1880)
- November 9 – Neville Chamberlain, Prime Minister of the United Kingdom (b. 1869)
- November 17
  - Eric Gill, English sculptor, lettering designer and writer (b. 1882)
  - Raymond Pearl, American biologist (b. 1879)
- November 18 – Ion Inculeț, Moldavian politician, 1st President of Moldova (b. 1884)
- November 24 – Saionji Kinmochi, Japanese prince and prime minister (b. 1849)
- November 26 – assassinations
  - Gheorghe Argeșanu, Romanian general and politician, 40th Prime Minister of Romania (b. 1883)
  - Ioan Bengliu, Romanian general (b. 1881)
  - Victor Iamandi, Romanian politician (b. 1891)
  - Mihail Moruzov, Romanian intelligence chief (b. 1887)
- November 27 – Nicolae Iorga, Romanian historian and politician, 34th Prime Minister of Romania (assassinated) (b. 1871)

=== December ===
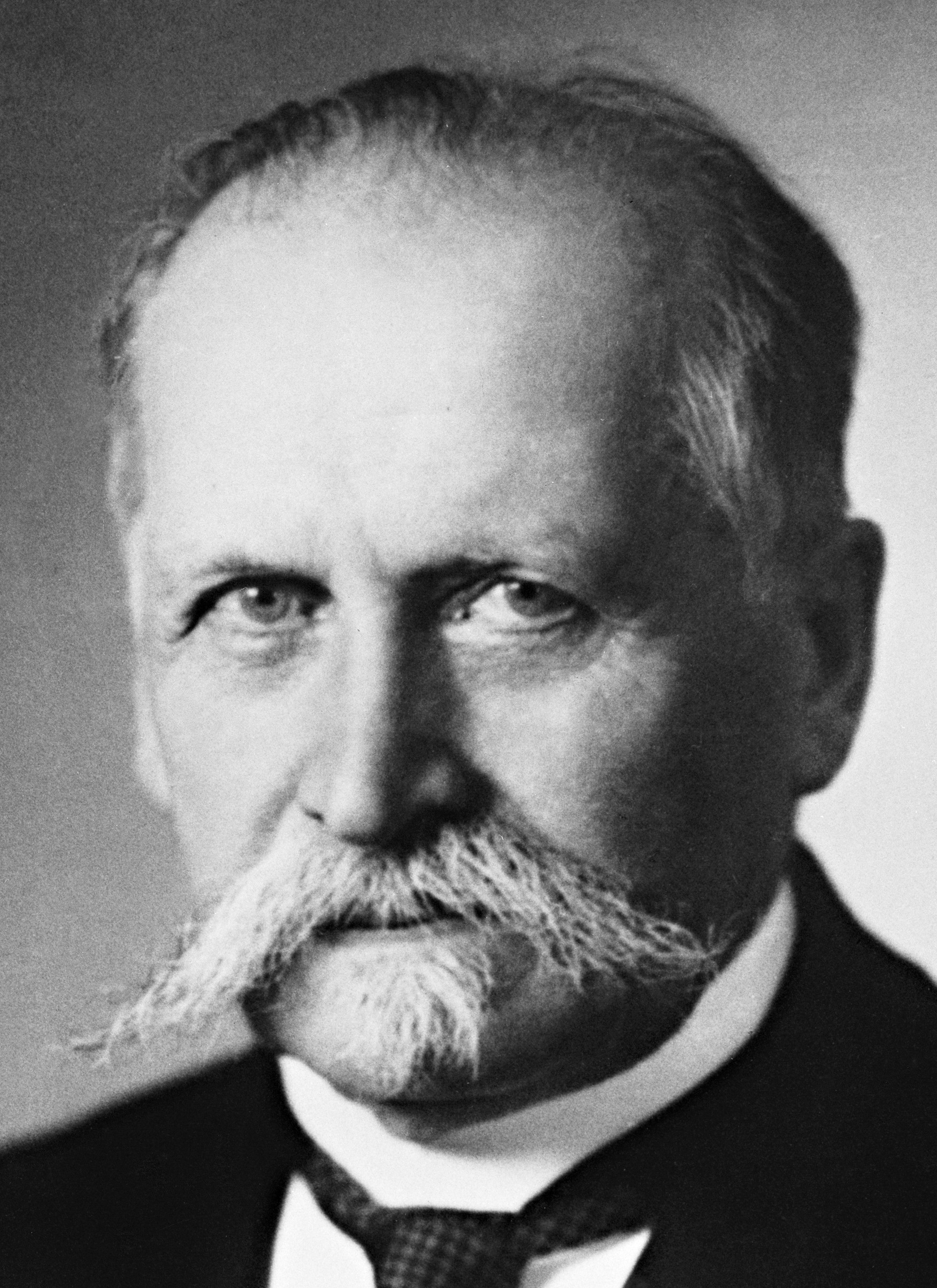
Kyösti Kallio

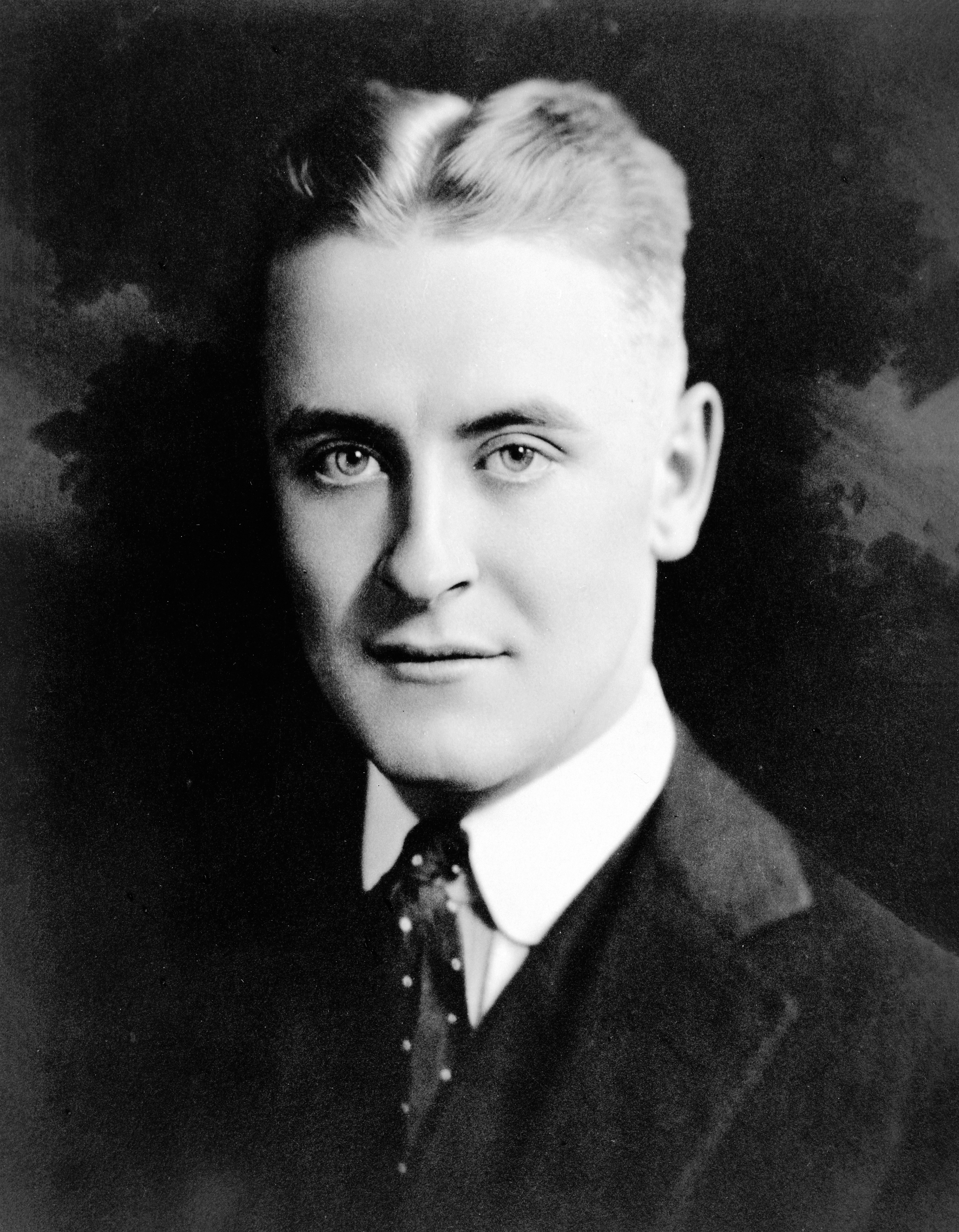
F. Scott Fitzgerald

- December 2 – Nikolai Koltsov, Russian biologist, genetist (b. 1872)
- December 5 – Jan Kubelík, Czech violinist (b. 1880)
- December 13 – Wilfred Lucas, Canadian-born American actor (b. 1871)
- December 14 – Anton Korošec, Slovenian political leader (b. 1872)
- December 15 – Billy Hamilton, American baseball player, MLB Hall of Famer (b. 1866)
- December 16 – Eugène Dubois, Dutch paleoanthropologist, geologist (b. 1858)
- December 19 – Kyösti Kallio, Finnish farmerman, banker, 8th Prime Minister of Finland and 4th President of Finland (b. 1873)
- December 21 – F. Scott Fitzgerald, American writer (b. 1896)
- December 22 – Nathanael West, American writer (b. 1903)
- December 23 – Eddie August Schneider, American aviator (b. 1911)
- December 25 – Agnes Ayres, American actress (b. 1898)
- December 26 – Daniel Frohman, American theater producer (b. 1851)

== Nobel Prizes ==

- Physics – not awarded
- Chemistry – not awarded
- Physiology or Medicine – not awarded
- Literature – not awarded
- Peace – not awarded
