= 1940 in the United Kingdom =

Events from the year 1940 in the United Kingdom. The year was dominated by Britain's involvement in the Second World War, which commenced in September the previous year, as well as the numerous enemy air raids on Britain and thousands of subsequent casualties. Although the war continued, Britain did triumph in the Battle of Britain and Nazi Germany's invasion attempt did not take place.

== Incumbents ==
- Monarch – George VI
- Prime Minister - Neville Chamberlain (Coalition) (until 10 May), Winston Churchill (Coalition) (starting 10 May)

== Events ==
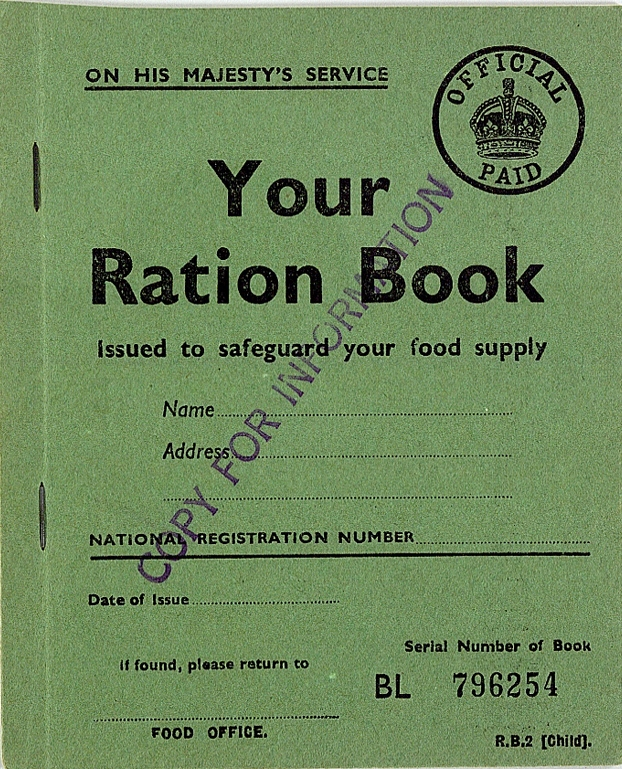
Child's ration book

- 1 January – World War II: Britain calls up 2,000,000 19- to 27-year-olds for military service.
- 3 January – Unity Mitford, daughter of David Freeman-Mitford, 2nd Baron Redesdale, and fervent admirer of Adolf Hitler, having attempted suicide, returns to England from Germany (via Switzerland); she is carried down the gangplank of the cross-channel ferry at Folkestone on a stretcher.
- 5 January – Oliver Stanley replaces Leslie Hore-Belisha as Secretary of State for War.
- 7 January – The BBC Forces Programme begins broadcasting; it becomes the most popular channel among civilians at home as well as its primary target audience.
- 8 January – Food rationing is introduced; it will remain in force until 1954.
- 9 January – World War II: liner Dunbar Castle of the Union Castle Line hits a mine in the English Channel and sinks with the loss of 9 men (2 dead and 7 missing).
- 17 January – A wave of freezing weather afflicting most of Europe leads to the River Thames freezing for the first time since 1888.
- 18 January – Explosion at Waltham Abbey Royal Gunpowder Mills (five killed).
- 26–30 January – Severe ice storm across the UK.
- 16 February – Altmark incident: Royal Navy destroyer HMS Cossack (F03) pursues German tanker Altmark into the neutral waters of the Jøssingfjorden in southwestern Norway and frees the 290 British seamen held aboard.
- February – The last mounted charge by a British cavalry regiment is made when the Royal Scots Greys are called to quell Arab rioters in Mandatory Palestine.
- 26 January – British battleship HMS Barham (04) is torpedoed by a U-boat but suffers only minor damage.
- March – Frisch–Peierls memorandum: Otto Frisch and Rudolf Peierls, at this time working at the University of Birmingham, calculate that an atomic bomb could be produced using very much less enriched uranium than has previously been supposed, making it a practical proposition.
- 3–9 March – RMS Queen Elizabeth makes her maiden voyage from Clydebank to New York.
- 11 March – Rationing of meat introduced.
- 13 March – Indian nationalist Udham Singh assassinates Sir Michael O'Dwyer (in revenge for the 1919 Jallianwala Bagh massacre) at Caxton Hall in London, for which he is hanged on 31 July at HM Prison Pentonville.
- 16 March – First civilian casualty of bombing in the UK, on Orkney.
- 18 March – Last terrorist bomb in the Irish Republican Army's S-Plan campaign on the British mainland (and until 1973) explodes harmlessly on a London rubbish dump.
- 21 March – Old Age and Widows' Pensions Act reduces the pensionable age for insured women and the wives of pensioned men from 65 to 60.
- 29 March – A metallic security thread is added to £1 notes to prevent forgeries.
- 31 March – 33 fascist sympathisers are interned.
- 1 April – British Overseas Airways Corporation begins operation as a single company.
- 5 April – Neville Chamberlain declares in a public speech that Hitler has "missed the bus".
- 9 April – British campaign in Norway commences following Operation Weserübung, the German invasion of neutral Denmark and Norway.
- 10 April – MAUD Committee first convened to consider the feasibility of an atomic bomb.
- 12–13 April – British occupation of the Faroe Islands, following the German invasion of Denmark, to avert a possible German occupation of the islands.
- 23 April – The War Budget sees the introduction of Purchase Tax and an increase in tobacco duties.
- 2 May – Last British and French troops evacuated from Norway following failure in the Norwegian Campaign.
- 7–9 May – Norway Debate in the House of Commons. Strong opposition to the Chamberlain ministry's conduct of the war make it impossible for him to continue as Prime Minister.
- 9 May
  - In private discussions, Viscount Halifax rules himself out as successor to Chamberlain in favour of Winston Churchill.
  - Guy Lloyd wins the East Renfrewshire by-election for the Unionist Party (Scotland).
- 10 May
  - Neville Chamberlain resigns as Prime Minister, and is replaced this evening by Winston Churchill with a coalition war ministry.
  - German invasion of France and the Low Countries, ending the "phoney war". British Invasion of Iceland, following the German invasion of Denmark and Norway, to avert a possible German occupation of the island, in violation of Iceland's neutrality.
- 13 May
  - Winston Churchill makes his famous "I have nothing to offer you but blood, toil, tears, and sweat" speech to the House of Commons.
  - Whit Monday is officially not observed as a bank holiday.
- 13–14 May – Queen Wilhelmina of the Netherlands and her government are evacuated to London using HMS Hereward following the German invasion of the Low Countries.
- 14 May – Recruitment begins for a home defence force – the Local Defence Volunteers, renamed as the Home Guard from 23 July.
- 16 May – Large-scale alien internment begins.
- 22 May – Parliament passes the Emergency Powers (Defence) Act 1940, giving the government full control over all persons and property.
- 23 May
  - Parliament passes the Treachery Act 1940 to facilitate the prosecution and execution of enemy spies.
  - British Union of Fascists leader Oswald Mosley and antisemitic MP Archibald Maule Ramsay are arrested and interned (until 1943 and 1944 respectively), under terms of an enhanced Defence Regulation 18B, in London prisons.
- 24 May – Anglo-French Supreme War Council decides to withdraw all forces under its control from Norway.
- 26 May–4 June – The Dunkirk evacuation of British Expeditionary Force takes place. 300,000 troops are evacuated from France to England.

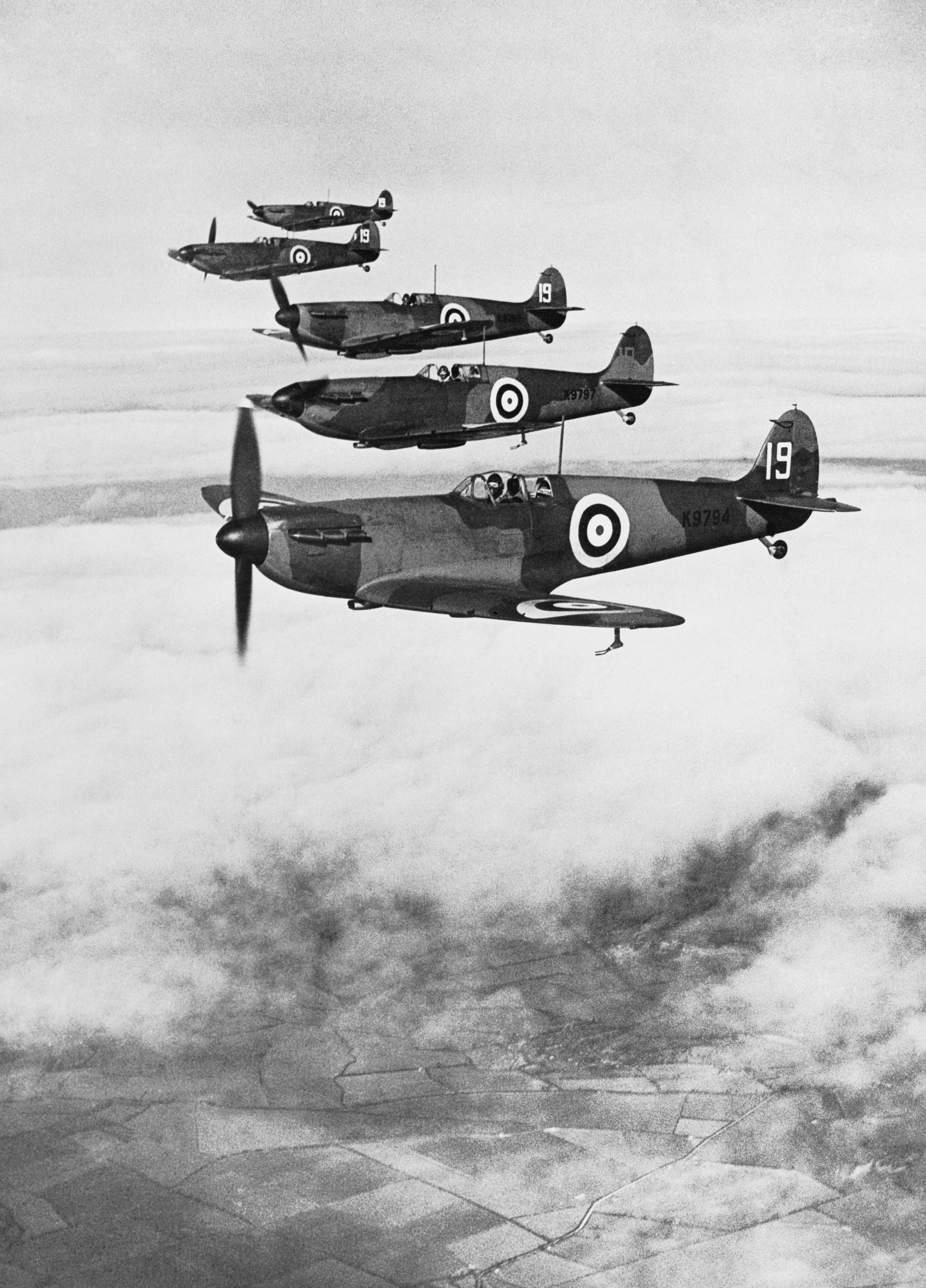
Supermarine Spitfire, used by the RAF during the Battle of Britain

- 28 May – May 1940 War Cabinet Crisis: Churchill wins the War Cabinet round to his view that there should be no peace negotiations with Hitler, contrary to the view of his Foreign Secretary, Viscount Halifax.
- 2 June – Secretary of State for War Anthony Eden gives a radio address claiming success of the Dunkirk evacuation.
- 4 June – Churchill makes his We shall fight on the beaches speech to the House of Commons.
- 5 June – Novelist J. B. Priestley broadcasts his first Sunday evening radio Postscript, "An Excursion to Hell", on the BBC Home Service, marking the role of the pleasure steamers in the Dunkirk evacuation.
- 7 June – King Haakon VII of Norway and his government are evacuated to London on HMS Devonshire.
- 9 June – The Commandos are created.
- 10 June – Italy declares war on France and the United Kingdom.
- 11 June – The Western Desert campaign opens with British forces crossing the Frontier Wire into Italian Libya.
- 12 June – Over 10,000 soldiers of the 51st (Highland) Division under General Victor Fortune surrender to Rommel at Saint-Valery-en-Caux.
- 16 June – The Churchill war ministry offers a Franco-British Union (inspired by Jean Monnet) to Paul Reynaud, Prime Minister of France, in the hope of preventing France from agreeing to an armistice with Nazi Germany, but Reynaud resigns when his own cabinet refuses to accept it.
- 17 June – RMS Lancastria, serving as a troopship, is bombed and sunk by the Luftwaffe while evacuating British troops and nationals from Saint-Nazaire with the loss of at least 4,000 lives, the largest single UK loss in any World War II event, immediate news of which is suppressed in the British press. Destroyer HMS Beagle (H30) rescues around 600.
- 18 June
  - Churchill makes his Battle of Britain speech to the House of Commons: "...the Battle of France is over. The Battle of Britain is about to begin... if the British Empire and its Commonwealth last for a thousand years, men will still say, This was their finest hour." He repeats the speech on BBC radio this evening.
  - The Ministry of Information issues more than 14 million copies of an advisory leaflet If the Invader Comes.
  - Appeal of 18 June: General Charles de Gaulle, de facto leader of the Free French Forces, makes his first broadcast appeal over Radio Londres from London, rallying French Resistance.
- 23 June – BBC Forces Programme begins broadcasting Music While You Work.
- 24 June–1 July – Operation Fish: Royal Navy cruiser HMS Emerald sails from Greenock in convoy to Halifax, Nova Scotia, carrying a large part of the gold reserves of the United Kingdom and securities for safe keeping in Canada. Another convoy sets sail on 5 July from the Clyde, including HMS Batory, carrying cargo worth $1.7 billion, the largest movement of wealth in history.
- 30 June – German forces land in Guernsey, start of the 5-year Occupation of the Channel Islands.
- 1 July – First Luftwaffe daylight bombing raid on mainland Britain at Wick, Caithness: 15 civilians, 8 of them children, are killed.
- 2 July – British-owned SS Arandora Star, carrying civilian internees and POWs of Italian and German origin from Liverpool to Canada, is torpedoed and sunk by German submarine U-47 off northwest Ireland with the loss of around 865 lives.

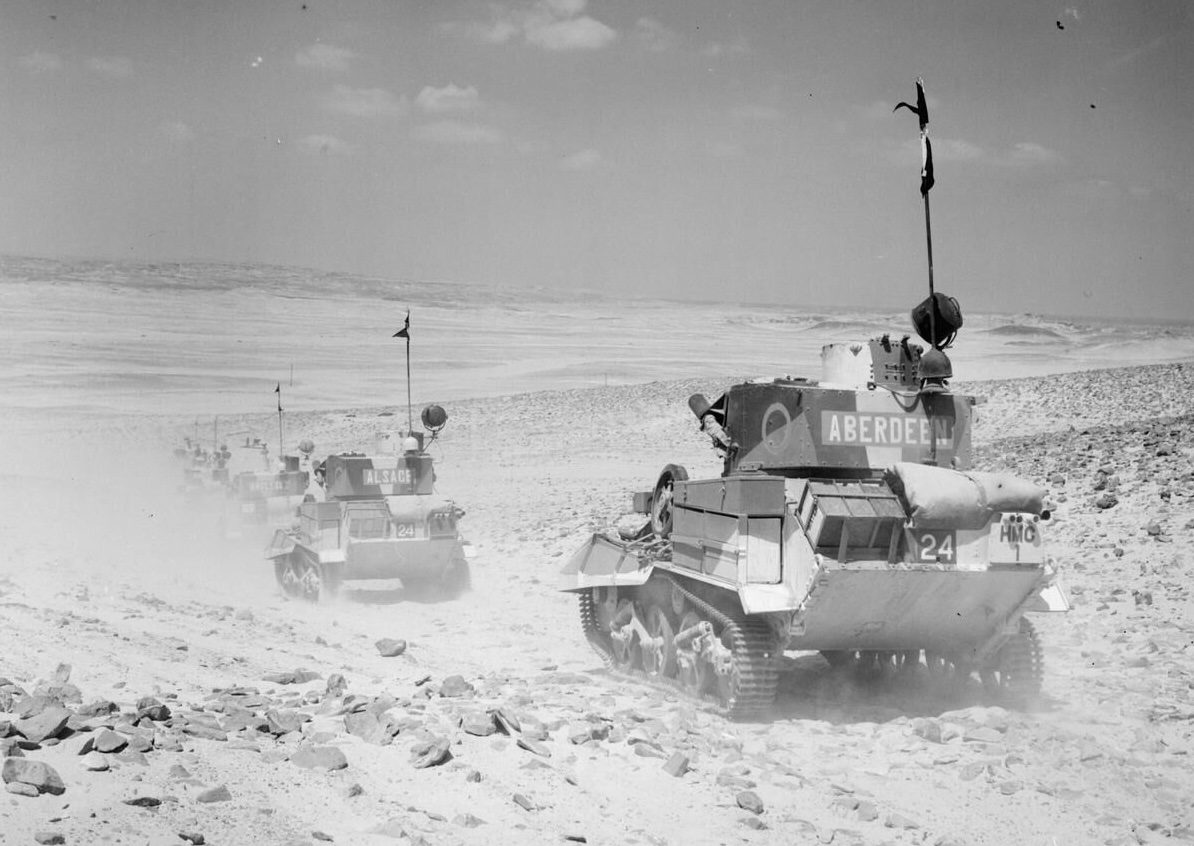
Western Desert campaign: Vickers light tanks Mk VI on patrol with 7th Armoured Division this summer

- 3 July
  - Operation Catapult aims to take French navy ships into British control or destroy them to prevent them falling into German hands. Those in port at Plymouth and Portsmouth are boarded and in an attack on Mers-el-Kébir British naval units sink or seize ships of the French fleet anchored in the Algerian ports of Mers El Kébir and Oran. The following day, Vichy France breaks off diplomatic relations with Britain.
  - Cardiff bombed for the first time.
- 10 July
  - Battle of Britain air offensive of the German Luftwaffe against RAF Fighter Command begins.
  - British Union of Fascists proscribed as an illegal organisation under the Treachery Act.
- 19 July
  - Adolf Hitler makes a peace appeal ("appeal to reason") to Britain in an address to the Reichstag. BBC German-language broadcaster Sefton Delmer unofficially rejects it at once and Lord Halifax, British foreign minister, flatly rejects peace terms in a broadcast reply on 22 July.
  - General Sir Alan Brooke is appointed Commander-in-Chief, Home Forces, in succession to General Ironside, ending the latter's emphasis on stop lines for defence.
- 22 July – Special Operations Executive formed to undertake espionage and sabotage in enemy-occupied countries.
- 9 August – Birmingham Blitz (Regenschirm): Heavy bombing of Birmingham begins.
- 13 August – Adlertag ("Eagle Day") strike on southern England occurs, starting the rapid escalation of the Battle of Britain.
- 18 August
  - "The Hardest Day" in the Battle of Britain: both sides lose more aircraft combined on this day than at any other point during the campaign without the Luftwaffe achieving dominance over the RAF.
  - The Duke of Windsor is installed as Governor of the Bahamas.
- 20 August – Churchill pays tribute in Parliament to the Royal Air Force fighter crews: "Never in the field of human conflict was so much owed by so many to so few."
- 22 August – Allied Forces Act 1940 gives authority for governments in exile in the UK to maintain their independent troops on British soil.
- 24 August
  - First air raid on London takes place.
  - Howard Florey and a team including Ernst Chain, Arthur Duncan Gardner, Norman Heatley, M. Jennings, J. Orr-Ewing and G. Sanders at the Sir William Dunn School of Pathology, University of Oxford, publish their laboratory results showing the in vivo bactericidal action of penicillin. They have also purified the drug.
- 26 August – RAF bombing of Berlin begins.
- 31 August – Texel Disaster: Two Royal Navy destroyers are sunk by running into a minefield off the coast of the occupied Netherlands with the loss of around 400 men, 300 of them dead.
- 2 September – Destroyers for Bases Agreement between the United Kingdom and United States is announced, to the effect that 50 U.S. destroyers needed for escort work will be transferred to Britain. In return, the United States gains 99-year leases on British bases in the North Atlantic, West Indies and Bermuda.
- 4 September – Adolf Hitler's Winterhilfe speech at the Berlin Sportpalast declares that Nazi Germany will make retaliatory night air raids on British cities and threatens invasion.
- 7 September
  - The Blitz begins with "Black Saturday". This will be the first of 57 consecutive nights of strategic bombing on London.
  - British high command issues the code "Cromwell" to troops, alerting them to possible German invasion.
- 10 September – A bomb at South Hallsville School, Canning Town in the East End of London, which is in use as an evacuation centre, kills at least 77 and perhaps four times as many.
- 11 September – Churchill, speaking from the Cabinet War Rooms, warns of a possible German invasion.
- 13 September – Buckingham Palace is damaged by the Luftwaffe in an air raid. The King and Queen survive without injury and inspect the damage.
- 15 September – RAF command claims victory over the Luftwaffe in the Battle of Britain; this day is thereafter known as "Battle of Britain Day".
- 17 September – Hitler postpones Operation Sea Lion (Unternehmen Seelöwe), the planned German invasion of Britain, indefinitely.
- 17–18 September – SS City of Benares is torpedoed by German submarine U-48 in the Atlantic with the loss of 248 of the 406 on board, including child evacuees bound for Canada. The sinking results in cancellation of the Children's Overseas Reception Board's plan to relocate British children abroad.
- 23 September – King George VI announces the creation of the George Cross decoration during a radio broadcast.
- 27 September – Battle of Graveney Marsh in Kent, the last exchange of shots with a foreign force on mainland British soil, takes place when soldiers of the London Irish Rifles capture the crew of a downed new German Junkers Ju 88 bomber who initially resist arrest with gunfire; one of the enemy is shot in the foot.
- 9 October – Winston Churchill succeeds Neville Chamberlain as Leader of the Conservative Party.
- 14 October – At least 66 people are killed when a German bomb penetrates Balham station on the London Underground which is in use as an air-raid shelter.
- 21 October – Purchase Tax is introduced, initially on luxury goods at 33.33%.
- 22 October – The Belgian government in exile, having been dispersed in France, Spain and Switzerland, regroups in London.
- 25 October – Air Chief Marshal Sir Charles Portal is appointed to succeed Sir Cyril Newall as Chief of the Air Staff, a post he will hold for the remainder of the War.
- 27 October – Cryptanalysis of the Enigma messages at Bletchley Park confirms that a German invasion will not be taking place.
- 31 October – The Battle of Britain ends.
- 5 November – Allied Convoy HX 84 is attacked by German cruiser Admiral Scheer in the North Atlantic; the sacrifice of escorting British armed merchant cruiser HMS Jervis Bay under Capt. Edward Fegen and SS Beaverford enables a majority of the ships (including tanker MV San Demetrio) to escape.
- 6 November – Fourteen children are killed when a German bomb hits the Civic Centre in Southampton.
- 9 November – Major fire at Castle Howard in Yorkshire (at this time housing an evacuated girls' school).
- 11 November – Battle of Taranto: the Royal Navy launches the first aircraft carrier strike in history, on the Italian fleet at Taranto.
- 14–15 November – Coventry Blitz: the centre of Coventry is destroyed by 500 German Luftwaffe bombers: 150,000 incendiary devices, 503 tons of high explosives and 130 parachute mines level 60,000 of the city's 75,000 buildings. At least 568 people are killed, while 863 more are injured. Exceptionally, the location and nature of the damage here is immediately publicised in the media.

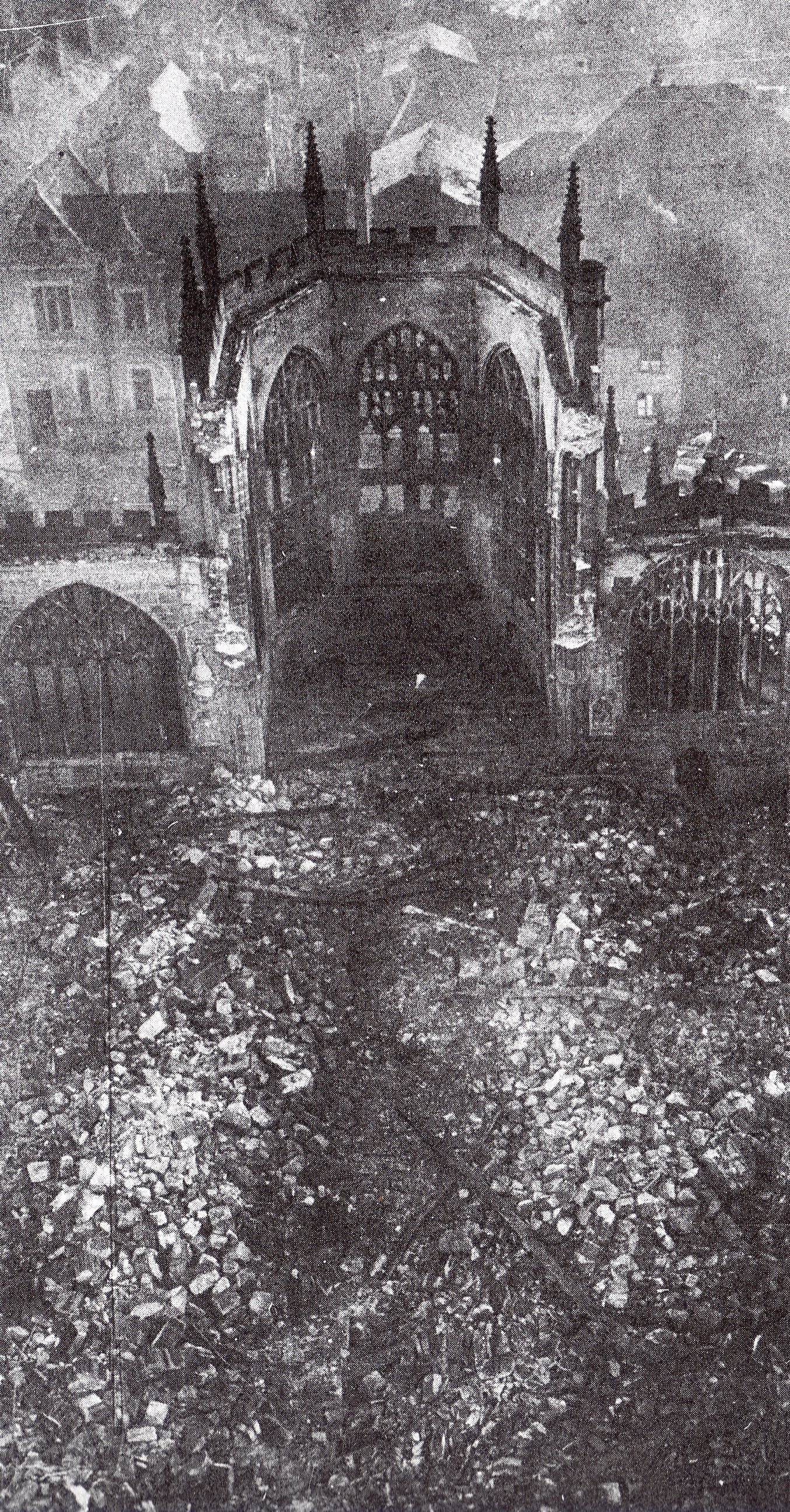
Coventry Cathedral after the Blitz

- 19 November – Less than a week after the blitz of Coventry, further heavy air raids take place in central England. Birmingham, West Bromwich, Dudley and Tipton are all bombed. Some 900 people are killed and 2,000 more injured – there are 53 deaths at the Birmingham Small Arms Company factory in Small Heath alone. Most of the region's casualties are in Birmingham.
- 23 November – Southampton Blitz: Southampton is bombed.
- 24 November – Bristol Blitz: beginning of the bombing of Bristol.
- 27 November–1 December – Oil storage depot fire at Turnchapel, Plymouth, caused by bombing.
- 29 November – Liverpool Blitz: a parachute mine hitting a basement shelter in Edge Hill, Liverpool, kills 166.
- 12–15 December – Sheffield Blitz ("Operation Crucible"): the city of Sheffield is heavily bombed by the Luftwaffe. 660 people are killed, while another 1,500 are injured and 30,000 more left homeless.
- 14 December – Release of the Ealing Studios war comedy Sailors Three, starring Tommy Trinder, Claude Hulbert and Michael Wilding; the song "All Over The Place", sung by Trinder in the film (words by Frank Eyton; music by Noel Gay), becomes one of the most popular of the war.
- 20 December – An anti-aircraft shell fired from Dudley accidentally strikes a public house in neighbouring Tipton, resulting in dozens of casualties.
- 20–21 December – Liverpool Blitz: Liverpool is heavily bombed, with well over 300 people killed and hundreds more injured.
- 22 December – Manchester Blitz: Manchester is heavily bombed as the Luftwaffe air raids on Britain continue. 363 are killed and 1,183 wounded; and Manchester Cathedral is badly damaged.
- 29 December – Heavy bombing in London causes the Second Great Fire of London. Guildhall is among many buildings badly damaged or destroyed. There are hundreds more casualties.

=== Undated ===
- Following the outbreak of World War II, housebuilding is halted, but some 1.1 million council houses have been built in the last 20 years to replace slum property, although the need for further demolition and rehousing remains, including the issue of rehousing families left homeless by air raids.
- The British Red Cross begins to open wartime charity shops.

== Publications ==
- Michael Foot, Frank Owen and Peter Howard's political tract Guilty Men (published under the pseudonym "Cato").
- Joyce Carey's novel Charley is My Darling.
- Agatha Christie's Hercule Poirot novels Sad Cypress and One, Two, Buckle My Shoe.
- T. S. Eliot's poem East Coker, second of the Four Quartets (in March New English Weekly).
- Graham Greene's novel The Power and the Glory.
- Michael Sadleir's novel Fanny by Gaslight.
- Thomas Sharp's Pelican book Town Planning.
- C. P. Snow's novel George Passant.
- C. Henry Warren's account England is a Village illustrated by Denys Watkins-Pitchford.
- Literary magazine Horizon, edited by Cyril Connolly (January).

== Births ==
- 4 January
  - Alexander Chancellor, English journalist (died 2017)
  - Brian Josephson, Welsh-born theoretical physicist, winner of the Nobel Prize in Physics
- 6 January – John Byrne, Scottish playwright (died 2023)
- 14 January – Trevor Nunn, stage and film director
- 15 January – Ted Lewis, English crime fiction writer (died 1982)
- 17 January – Leighton Rees, Welsh darts player (died 2003)
- 18 January
  - Lindsay L. Cooper, Scottish jazz string player (died 2001)
  - Tony Holland, actor and screenwriter (died 2007)
- 19 January – Mike Reid, comedian, actor and author (died 2007)
- 22 January
  - John Hurt, actor (died 2017)
  - Gillian Shephard, Baroness Shephard of Northwold, politician
- 23 January
  - Brian Labone, footballer (died 2006)
  - Ted Rowlands, politician
- 31 January – Pat Kavanagh, South African-born literary agent (died 2008)
- 2 February – David Jason, television actor
- 6 February – Jimmy Tarbuck, comedian
- 7 February – Mick McNeil, English footballer (died 2025)
- 9 February – Brian Bennett, pop drummer and songwriter
- 10 February – Mary Rand, track and field athlete (died 2026)
- 11 February – Lord Tim Hudson, disc jockey and sports manager (died 2019)
- 12 February – Ralph Bates, film and television actor (died 1991)
- 20 February – Jimmy Greaves, footballer and television pundit (died 2021)
- 21 February – Peter Gethin, racing driver (died 2011)
- 22 February – Judy Cornwell, actress
- 24 February
  - Denis Law, Scottish footballer (died 2025)
  - John Lyall, football player and manager (died 2006)
- 1 March – David Broome, Welsh-born showjumping champion
- 2 March – Billy McNeill, Scottish football player and manager (died 2019)
- 5 March – Henrietta Russell, Duchess of Bedford, aristocrat and horse breeder
- 11 March
  - Derek Deadman, comedy actor (died 2014)
  - Bobby Graham, session drummer (died 2009)
- 15 March
  - Raymond Allen, scriptwriter and playwright (died 2022)
  - Frank Dobson, politician (died 2019)
- 23 March – Alan Blaikley, songwriter (died 2022)
- 25 March – Simon Murray, businessman and explorer
- 28 March
  - Bevis Hillier, art historian
  - Martin Neary, organist and choral conductor (died 2025)
- 30 March – Norman Gifford, cricketer
- 1 April – Annie Nightingale, radio music presenter (died 2024)
- 2 April
  - Mike Hailwood, motorcycle racer (died 1981)
  - Peter Haining, author (died 2007)
  - Penelope Keith, actress (died 2026)
- 10 April – Gloria Hunniford, Northern Irish broadcast presenter
- 13 April – Max Mosley, racing driver and lawyer (died 2021)
- 14 April
  - David Hope, Baron Hope of Thornes, Archbishop of York
  - Angela Lambert, journalist and writer (died 2007)
- 15 April – Jeffrey Archer, politician, novelist and perjurer (died 2026)
- 16 April – Margaret Maden, academic
- 17 April
  - Billy Fury, singer-songwriter (died 1983)
  - John McCririck, bookmaker, horse racing pundit and television personality (died 2019)
- 18 April – Norman Giller, sports author and scriptwriter
- 25 April
  - Chryssie Lytton Cobbold, Baroness Cobbold, aristocrat and writer (died 2024)
  - Tristram Powell, television director, film director, writer and producer
- 1 May
  - Chris Mead, ornithologist (died 2003)
  - John Wheeler, politician
- 6 May – Alexandra Burslem, academic
- 7 May – Angela Carter, novelist and journalist (died 1992)
- 8 May – James Blyth, Baron Blyth of Rowington, English businessman and academic
- 9 May
  - Colin Dobson, English footballer (died 2023)
  - Alan Ryan, English philosopher and academic
- 12 May – Dominic Cadbury, English businessman and academic
- 13 May – Bruce Chatwin, novelist and travel writer (died 1989)
- 14 May
  - Chay Blyth, Scottish yachtsman and adventurer
  - H. Jones, soldier (VC recipient) (killed in action 1982)
- 16 May – Gareth Roberts, Welsh-born physicist (died 2007)
- 21 May – Tony Sheridan, rock singer-songwriter and guitarist (died 2013 in Germany)
- 23 May – Giles Gordon, Scottish author and agent (died 2003)
- 27 May – Gillian Barge, actress (died 2003)
- 4 June – David Collings, stage and screen actor (died 2020)
- 7 June
  - Monica Evans, actress
  - Tom Jones, Welsh singer
  - Ronald Pickup, actor (died 2021)
- 16 June – Carole Ann Ford, actress
- 20 June – John Mahoney, actor (died 2018 in the United States)
- 22 June
  - Hubert Chesshyre, officer of arms (died 2020)
  - Esther Rantzen, journalist, television presenter and campaigner (died 2026)
- 23 June
  - Adam Faith, born Terry Nelhams, pop singer, screen actor and financial journalist (died 2003)
  - Derry Irvine, Scottish-born Lord Chancellor of England
  - Stu Sutcliffe, Scottish-born original bass player in The Beatles (died 1962 in Germany)
- 25 June – A. J. Quinnell, born Philip Nicholson, thriller writer (died 2005 in Malta)
- 27 June – Eric Richard, born Eric Smith, actor and presenter
- 29 June – John Dawes, Welsh rugby player (died 2021)
- 1 July – Craig Brown, Scottish football player and manager (died 2023)
- 2 July
  - Kenneth Clarke, politician, Chancellor of the Exchequer 1993-1997
  - Alan Cuckston, harpsichordist (died 2025)
- 4 July – Dave Rowberry, rock pianist and songwriter (The Animals) (died 2003)
- 7 July – Ringo Starr, born Richard Starkey, rock drummer (The Beatles)
- 10 July – Tom Farmer, Scottish entrepreneur, founder of Kwik Fit (died 2025)
- 11 July – Tommy Vance, radio broadcaster (died 2005)
- 13 July – Patrick Stewart, actor (died 2026)
- 15 July – Robert Winston, Baron Winston, medical doctor and life peer
- 17 July – Tim Brooke-Taylor, broadcast comedy performer (died 2020)
- 28 July – Brigit Forsyth, actress (died 2023)
- 30 July – Clive Sinclair, inventor (died 2021)
- 31 July – Roy Walker, Northern Irish comedian
- 10 August – Barbara Mills, first female Director of Public Prosecutions (died 2011)
- 12 August – Arthur Edwards, photographer
- 16 August – John Craven, journalist and presenter
- 17 August – Joe Baker, footballer (died 2003)
- 18 August – Stanley Johnson, politician and author
- 22 August – John Banham, businessman (died 2022)
- 3 September
  - Pauline Collins, actress (died 2025)
  - Frank Duffy, architect
- 6 September – Jackie Trent, singer-songwriter and actress (died 2015)
- 8 September – Peter Chisman, racing cyclist (died 2003)
- 13 September – Brian Brain, cricketer (died 2023)
- 16 September – Paul White, Baron Hanningfield, politician and farmer (died 2024)
- 17 September – Peter Lever, cricketer (died 2025)
- 19 September – Zandra Rhodes, fashion designer
- 20 September – Anna Pavord, horticultural writer
- 27 September – Josephine Barstow, soprano
- 29 September – Jimmy Knapp, trade unionist (died 2001)
- 1 October – Atarah Ben-Tovim, flautist and children's concert promoter
- 9 October – John Lennon, rock singer-songwriter (The Beatles) (murdered 1980)
- 14 October
  - Cliff Richard, born Harry Webb in British India, pop singer and film actor
  - Christopher Timothy, Welsh actor, television director and writer
- 17 October
  - Jim Smith, footballer and manager (died 2019)
  - Peter Stringfellow, nightclub owner (died 2018)
- 19 October – Michael Gambon, Irish-born actor (died 2023)
- 24 October – David Sainsbury, Baron Sainsbury of Turville, politician, businessman and philanthropist
- 31 October – Eric Griffiths, Welsh-born skiffle guitarist (The Quarrymen) (died 2005)
- 3 November – Charlie Gallagher, Scottish footballer (died 2021)
- 4 November – Daniel Sperber, Welsh-born Israeli Talmudic scholar
- 5 November – Anthony Rolfe Johnson, operatic tenor (died 2010)
- 8 November – Terri Quaye, singer, pianist and percussionist
- 14 November – David McCabe, fashion photographer (died 2021)
- 18 November – Margaret Chapman, illustrator (died 2000)
- 21 November – Amelia Freedman, arts administrator (died 2025)
- 27 November – John Alderton, actor
- 10 December – Anne Gibson, Baroness Gibson of Market Rasen, English trade union leader and author (died 2018)
- 20 December – Pat Chapman, English chef and author, founder of The Curry Club
- 22 December – Noel Jones, Indian-born British Ambassador to Kazakhstan (died 1995)

== Deaths ==
- 19 January – Grace Hadow, activist for female advancement (born 1875)
- 7 February – Clara Novello Davies, singer, mother of Ivor Novello (born 1861)
- 11 February – John Buchan, Scottish novelist, Unionist politician and Governor General of Canada (born 1875)
- 14 February – Harry Tate, music hall comedian (born 1872)
- 21 March – Violet Bland, suffragette (born 1863)
- 24 March – Thomas Adams, urban planner (born 1871)
- 30 March – Sir George Egerton, admiral (born 1852)
- 18 April
  - H. A. L. Fisher, historian and Liberal politician (born 1865; died as result of road accident)
  - Florrie Forde, music hall singer (born 1875 in Australia)
- 2 May – Ernest Joyce, Antarctic explorer (born c.1875)
- 3 May – Leslie Heward, conductor and composer (born 1897)
- 7 May – George Lansbury, politician and social reformer, leader of the Labour Party from 1932 to 1935 (born 1859)
- 3 June – James Campbell Clouston, naval commander (born 1900 in Canada; died in Dunkirk evacuation)
- 17 June – Sir Arthur Harden, chemist, Nobel Prize laureate (born 1865)
- 24 June – Alfred Fowler, astronomer (born 1868)
- 16 July – Ray Strachey, feminist campaigner (born 1887)
- 8 August – Eileen Power, medieval economic historian (born 1889)
- 22 August – Sir Oliver Lodge, physicist (born 1851)
- 30 August – J. J. Thomson, physicist, Nobel Prize laureate (born 1856)
- 26 September – W. H. Davies, Welsh poet and author (born 1871)
- 9 October – Sir Wilfred Grenfell, medical missionary to Newfoundland and Labrador (born 1865)
- 30 October – Hilda Matheson, pioneering radio talks producer (born 1888)
- 2 November
  - Edith Aitken, headmistress (born 1861)
  - Squadron Leader Archie McKellar, fighter ace (born 1912; killed in Battle of Britain)
- 9 November – Neville Chamberlain, Prime Minister from 1937 to 1940 (born 1869)
- 16 December – William Wallace, Scottish composer (born 1860)
- 17 December – Alicia Boole Stott, mathematician (born 1860)
- Elfrida Rathbone, educationalist (born 1871)

== See also ==
- List of British films of 1940
- Military history of the United Kingdom during World War II
