= SS Mopan =

British cargo liner

History

United Kingdom
- Name: Mopan
- Owner: Elders & Fyffes Limited.
- Operator: Fyffes Line
- Port of registry: (United Kingdom) Liverpool
- Route: United Kingdom - West Indies
- Builder: Cammell Laird Ltd, Birkenhead
- Yard number: 949
- Launched: 13 February 1929
- In service: 1929
- Out of service: 1940
- Identification: UK official number 161091; call sign G X S D
- Fate: Sunk by shellfire from Panzerschiffe Admiral Scheer: 5 November 1940

General characteristics
- Type: cargo liner
- Tonnage: 5,389 GRT
- Length: 397 ft (121 m)
- Beam: 51.5 ft (15.7 m)
- Draught: 25 ft 7 1/2 in (7.81 m)
- Depth: 30.2 ft (9.2 m)
- Installed power: 447 NHP
- Propulsion: 1 x 3 cyl. triple expansion steam engine, single shaft, single screw.
- Speed: 13.5 knots (25.0 km/h)
- Crew: 68
- Armament: (as DEMS)

SS Mopan was a British steam cargo liner operated by the Fyffes Line from 1929 to 1940 until she was intercepted in mid-Atlantic and sunk by the German pocket battleship Admiral Scheer, becoming the first victim of Admiral Scheer's commerce raiding sortie.

== Construction ==
Mopan was built in the Birkenhead yards of Cammell Laird Ltd. With a length of 397 ft (121 m), a 51.5 ft (15.7 m) beam and a gross registered tonnage of 5389, Mopan was powered by a single three cylinder triple expansion steam engine which produced 447 NHP. A single screw was driven via a shaft and gave her a service speed of 13.5 knots (25.0 km/h).

Registered in Liverpool, Mopan had crew accommodation for 68.

== Service life ==
Following her sea trials Mopan joined the rest of the Fyffes Line and commenced her service life plying between the United Kingdom and the West Indies, engaged in the transportation of bananas.

=== Second World War ===
==== Background ====
At the outbreak of World War II in September 1939, Admiral Scheer remained at anchor in the Schillig roadstead outside Wilhelmshaven with the heavy cruiser Admiral Hipper, her only action being on 4 September when two groups of five Bristol Blenheim bombers attacked the ships. During the attack one bomb struck the Scheer's deck, but failed to explode, whilst a further two detonated in the water near the ship. Gunners aboard Admiral Scheer managed to shoot down one of the five Bristol Blenheims and she emerged from the attack undamaged.

In the Autumn of 1940 Admiral Scheer received orders to commence commerce raiding, the operation being under the overall control of Admiral Karl Doenitz at German Naval Group Command West. With the highly experienced Kapitän zur See Theodor Krancke in command,Admiral Scheer sailed in October 1940 on her first combat sortie. Continuing undetected by ships of the Royal Navy or aircraft from RAF Coastal Command, on the night of 31 October she slipped through the Denmark Strait and broke out into the open Atlantic.

The Scheer proceeded to sortie towards the Greenland Ice Barrier following which Kapitän Krancke made a decision to plot a course towards 53°00′N 35°00′W. This would place the Admrial Scheer within the Atlantic Gap, and once established in this area it would afford the opportunity to maximise the search by repeatedly crossing what was presumed to be the Halifax convoy route.

Radio silence was broken for the first time since leaving port at 23:16hrs on 1 November in order to report that the latitude of 60 degrees North had just been crossed. This message concluded the initial stage of the operation, namely the successful breakthrough into the Atlantic.

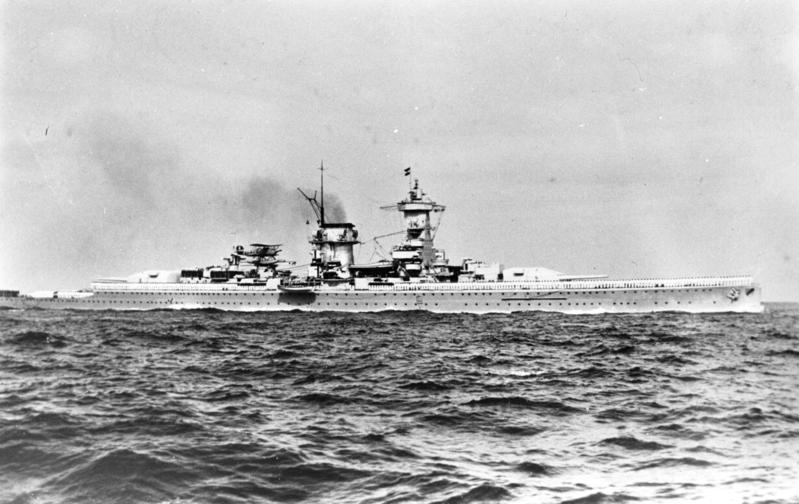
Panzerschiff Admiral Scheer

==== Interception ====
Under the command of her Master, Captain Sapsworth, the Mopan had departed Port Antonio bound for Garston, Liverpool, with a cargo of bananas (one of the last consignments of the fruit destined for the United Kingdom before the wartime ban was introduced). On the morning of 5 November, as she continued on passage, the Mopan passed Convoy HX 84, sailing eastbound from Halifax, Nova Scotia, also bound for Liverpool. An offer was made for the Mopan to join the convoy, however this was declined by Sapsworth who decided that he would sail on alone.

Having been thwarted from using its 2 Arado Ar 196 seaplanes the previous day, on 5 November the weather was suitable for the Admiral Scheer to utilise its air reconnaissance. Piloted by Lieutenant Pietsch, a seaplane was launched at 09:40hrs having been ordered to make a sweep 100 nautical miles (190 km; 120 mi) wide and 70 nautical miles (130 km; 81 mi) deep. When the seaplane returned at 12:05hrs the observer reported having sighted a convoy steaming eastbound at position 52 41 N. 32 52 W. This meant that the intervening distance between the Scheer and the convoy was approximately 90 nautical miles (170 km; 100 mi). No escort had been observed. This confirmed the earlier B-Dienst radio intercept by the Scheer which had identified the convoy as being HX 84.

The proximity of HX 84 posed a dilemma to Kapitän Krancke regarding whether he should attack the convoy before nightfall, or wait and make his attack at dawn the following day. Even though it meant only two hours of daylight would be available for the attack, Krancke made his decision to intercept and brought the Scheer onto a course of 150 degrees and increased his speed to 23 knots (43 km/h). At 14:27hrs, an hour before the Scheer was scheduled to intercept the convoy, a single smoke column was observed. Once visual acquisition had been made a flag could be observed flying from the masthead, however the purpose of this could not be established. Unsure as to the identity of the vessel Krancke decided to maintain his course, as to turn away to the east would significantly reduce his ability to intercept HX 84 before darkness fell. As the range decreased it was decided that the vessel was an armed merchantman, acting as a screen, and stationed ahead or on the flank of the convoy.

It was at this point that "action stations" was sounded onboard the Scheer. Krancke trained all his armament on to the Mopan with the Scheer firing warning shots from her secondary armament of 15 cm (5.9 in) SK C/28 guns, which exploded close to the freighters bow. At 15:08hrs, by use of a signal lamp, the Scheer ordered the Mopan to heave to.

Admiral Scheer then proceeded to hoist a flag signal stating "Take to your boats and bring your papers across." Kapitän Krancke kept his guns trained on the Mopan's wireless transmission aerials on her masthead and accompanied this with an order that the ship's Wireless was not to be used. This caused some rancour onboard the Mopan with her Wireless Officer, James Macintosh, on more than one occasion pleading with Captain Sapsworth to ignore the request from the Admiral Scheer and transmit the internationally recognised signal: R-R-R (I Am Being Attacked By A Raider), thereby affording Convoy HX 84 the ability to take some form of evasive action. However with the guns of the Scheer trained on the Mopan, and given the realisation that at any time his ship could be blown from beneath him, Capt. Sapsworth chose to refuse Macintosh's requests and instead he ordered his ship's company to abandon ship. The order was carried out in a measured and organised manner, something that was not lost on Kapitän Krancke.

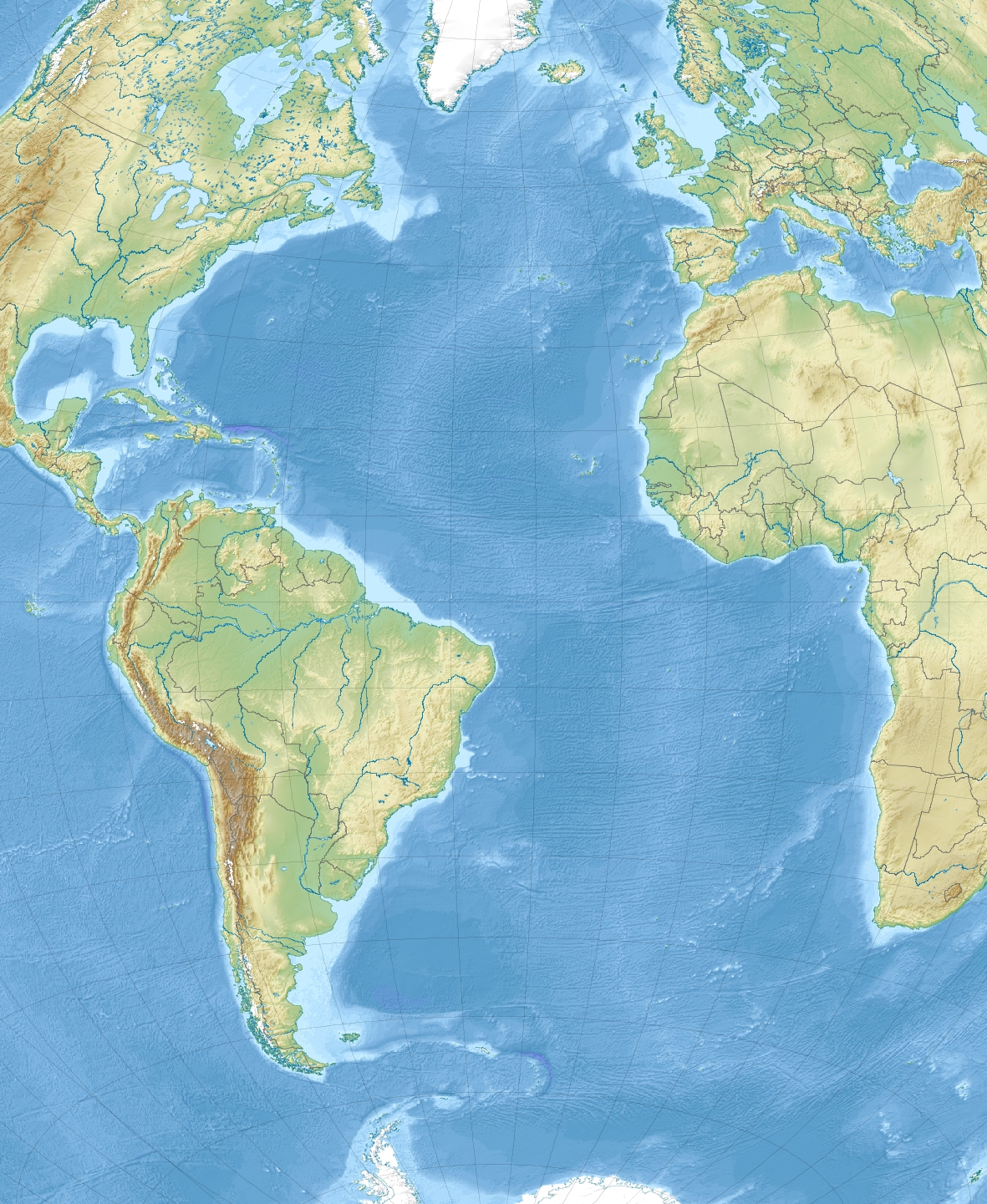
Approximate position of Mopan's wreck

==== Sinking ====
Following the evacuation of the Mopan, Admiral Scheer proceeded to sink the vessel. However this proved to be a more difficult task than was initially envisaged.

If he was to make a successful interception of HX 84 before nightfall, Krancke knew that time was beginning to run short. No Prize Crew was sent to the Mopan, instead Admiral Scheer opened fire on the merchantman from a distance of approximately 300 yards using a combination of her secondary armament of 15 cm (5.9 in) SK C/28 guns and her main armament of 28 cm (11.0 in) SK C/28 guns. Vexed by the continued stubbornness of the Mopan, Kapitän Krancke ordered an increase in the rate of fire from the Scheer's gunners in addition to which he requested the presence of Captain Sapsworth, who cautioned against the targeting of the aft end of his ship as it was where the ammunition for the Mopan's 4in gun was stored. Mopan finally sank at 16:05hrs.

==== Aftermath ====
It is highly debatable that given the unimportance of intercepting a sole merchantman when viewed against that of attacking a 38 ship convoy with negligible protection, that the Admiral Scheer would have taken the opportunity to carry out the action that it did. Indeed, the time scale that was taken with the interception and subsequent sinking of the Mopan, together with that of the successive action against HMS Jervis Bay and SS Beaverford, may well have played a significant factor in the inability of the Admiral Scheer to completely decimate Convoy HX 84. Although he failed to warn HX 84 of the direct threat that stood in the convoy's way, nevertheless by ordering the slow and orderly evacuation of the Mopan it could well be viewed that Captain Sapsworth played a direct part in delaying the interception of HX 84 by Admiral Scheer.

The crew of the Mopan may well have viewed Sapsworth as both a coward and in some ways guilty of neglecting the ships in convoy HX 84, especially during their years in a German prisoner of war camp. However a counterbalance to that could be that Sapsworth did what he thought was best at that particular time, for his ship and the crew in his charge.

== Official number and code letters ==
Official numbers are issued by individual flag states. They should not be confused with IMO ship identification numbers. Mopan had the UK Official Number 161091 and used the Code Letters G X S D.

== See also ==
- Kapitän Theodor Krancke
- Admiral Scheer
- Convoy HX 84
- Battle of the Atlantic

== Bibliography ==
- Showell, Jak P Mallmann (2003). German Naval Code Breakers. Annapolis: Naval Institute Press. ISBN 978-1-59114-308-6.
- Watson, Bruce Allen (2006). Atlantic Convoys and Nazi Raiders: The Deadly Voyage of HMS Jervis Bay. Barnsley: Praeger Publishers. ISBN 0-275-98827-9.
