= Sea Gallantry Medal =

British Gallantry medal

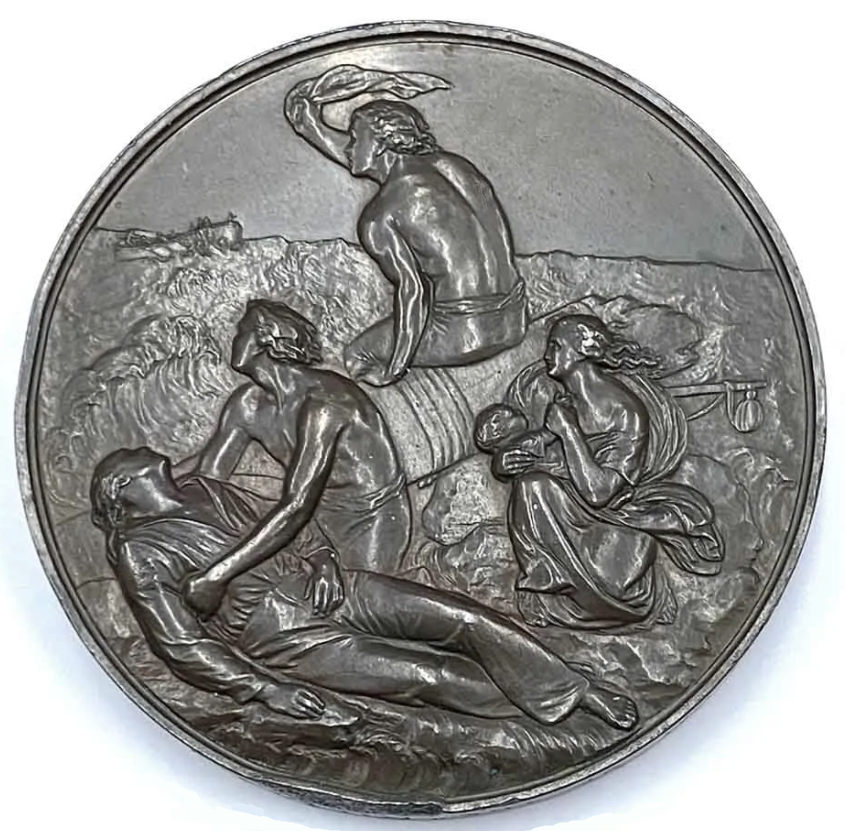
- Sea Gallantry Medal, reverse
- Type: Civil decoration
- Awarded for: Saving life at sea
- Presented by: United Kingdom
- Eligibility: Those who save the lives of British citizens
- First award: 1855
- Final award: 1989
- Ribbon bar: SGM SGM (Foreign Services) pre–1922

Order of Wear
- Next (higher): Constabulary Medal (Ireland)
- Next (lower): Indian Order of Merit (Civil)

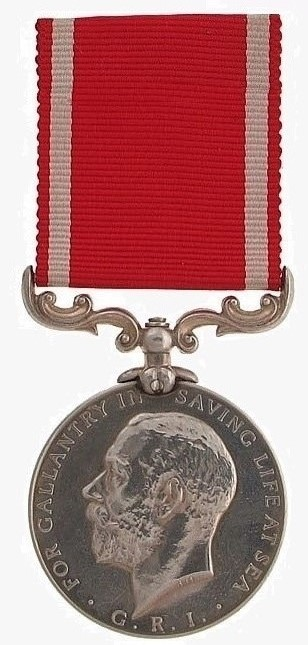
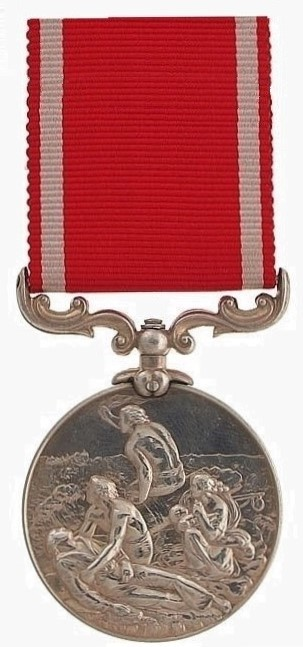
Sea Gallantry Medal, George V version

The Sea Gallantry Medal (SGM) (officially the "Medal for Saving Life at Sea", and originally the "Board of Trade Medal for Saving Life at Sea"), is a United Kingdom award for civil gallantry at sea.

== History ==
The Merchant Shipping Act 1854 provided for rewards to lifesavers, leading to the creation of the Sea Gallantry Medal, first struck in 1855. These were to be in gold, silver or bronze, although there is no evidence that the gold version was ever awarded. Early awards were either for "humanity" (where there was little risk to the life of the recipient, for example a captain directing a rescue from his own ship), or for "gallantry" (where there was significant risk to the recipient). Few "humanity" awards were made, and from 1893 such service was recognised by the award of plate or monetary sums.

The 1854 Act indicated that the award was to be conferred on those "affording assistance towards the preservation of life and property in cases of shipwreck and distress at sea". In 1887 the Board of Trade further defined the award as "for the rescue of life from shipwreck on the coasts of the United Kingdom, whether the ship is British or foreign", as well as for the "rescue of life from British vessels" in more distant seas. In practice, it was awarded only to seafarers serving with British registered merchant ships. It could be given both for individual gallantry and for collective cases of heroism, for example to each member of a boat's crew. Awards could be made posthumously.

Previously worn after campaign and polar medals, since 1929 the Sea Gallantry Medal has been worn with other medals for gallantry and before campaign medals. Recipients received the right to use the post-nominal "SGM" in 1936.

The most recent grant of the SGM was a bronze award in 1989. Although not formally abolished, it appears that the award has now fallen into disuse. This is confirmed by the UK Government website relating to nominations for bravery awards, which (in February 2021) only included four bravery awards that the Honours and Appointments Secretariat will consider: the George Cross, George Medal, King's Gallantry Medal and the King's Commendation for Bravery.

== Appearance ==
The original medal had a diameter of 2.3 inches (58 mm) and was not intended for wear. In 1903 the size was reduced to 1.3 inches (33 mm) and a suspension bar added, with the medal worn on the left breast from a 1.25 inches (32 mm) wide red ribbon with a white stripe towards each edge.

The design of both sizes of medal is the same. The obverse bears the effigy of the reigning sovereign, with the Royal Cypher below, surrounded by the words AWARDED BY THE BOARD OF TRADE FOR GALLANTRY IN SAVING LIFE, (or AWARDED BY THE BOARD OF TRADE FOR SAVING LIFE AT SEA for 'humanity' awards), changing to FOR GALLANTRY IN SAVING LIFE AT SEA on the smaller post-1903 medals. The reverse, which has no inscription, depicts a shipwrecked group, one of whom beckons to a distant lifeboat. The name of the recipient and date of the rescue are inscribed on the medal's edge.

== Numbers awarded ==
A total of 1,237 larger medals were awarded up to 1903, 479 silver, 749 bronze, with nine where the class is not known. From 1903 to 1979, 957 of the smaller type were issued, 480 silver (including one second award clasp) and 477 bronze. After the wearable medal was introduced, those who had received a larger medal after the accession of Edward VII were permitted to exchange, a number of recipients doing so.

=== Notable recipients ===
- Rear-Admiral Sir Christopher Cradock
- Captain Edward Evans – later Admiral The Lord Mountevans
- Lieutenant Fogarty Fegen – later Captain of HMS Jervis Bay and Commodore of Convoy HX 84
- Lieutenant Max Horton – later Admiral Sir Max Horton
- Lieutenant John Jellicoe – later Admiral of the Fleet The Lord Jellicoe
- Sergeant Ludovicus M. M. Van Iersel – U.S. Army Medal of Honor recipient in World War I

== Sea Gallantry Medal (Foreign Services) ==
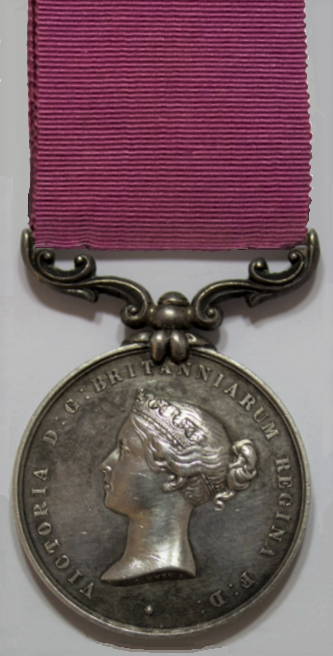
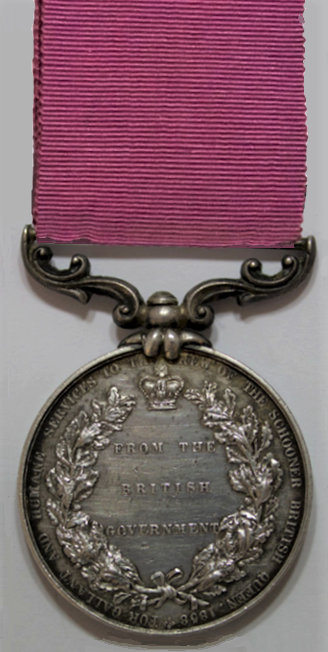
Sea Gallantry Medal (Foreign Services), 1854–1902 version

This award, which pre-dates the Sea Gallantry Medal, was instituted in 1841 for foreigners who saved live from British vessels, although some early awards were for service on land. It was awarded in both gold and silver, with a small number of bronze awards.

The original medal had a diameter of 1.78 inches (45 mm) and was not intended for wear. In 1854 the size was reduced to 1.3 inches (33 mm) and a suspension bar added, the medal worn on the left breast. The ribbon was plain crimson until 1922, when that of the SGM for British citizens was adopted.

The design of both the large and small medals is the same, with the obverse bearing the effigy of the reigning monarch with a suitable inscription. The reverse has a crowned wreath surrounding the words PRESENTED BY [or FROM] THE BRITISH GOVERNMENT with, around the edge, an inscription indicating the nature of the rescue – for example: saving the life of a British subject or assisting a British vessel in distress. Early issues had a separate reverse die prepared for each medal; a practice dropped from 1849 due to cost. The name of recipient and, in most cases, the place and date of the service rendered is inscribed on the medal's edge.

Up to 1854, 228 large medals were awarded, 96 gold, 118 silver and 14 bronze. Since then at least 2,074 small medals have been earned, 285 gold, 1,783 silver and six bronze. Two recipients have received both gold and silver medals, and one second silver award clasp has been issued. No medals have been bestowed since 1968 and, like the SGM for British citizens, it appears that awards are no longer made, although it has not been formally abolished.

== See also ==
- Mercantile Marine War Medal: also issued by the Board of Trade
