= F68 =

F68 may refer to:

- Farman F.68, a French aircraft
- HMS Ascania (F68), a Cunard ocean liner requisitioned for the Royal Navy
