= Ascania =

Ascania may refer to:

- House of Ascania, a German noble family who ruled the Duchy of Anhalt in Saxony and other territories, including Saxony and Brandenburg
- Ascania Island, an island in the Cyclades near Santorini
- Lake Ascania by Nicaea, now known as Lake İznik in Bursa Province, Turkey
- Askania-Nova, a biosphere reserve in Kherson Oblast, Ukraine
- RMS Ascania (1911), originally laid down as the Gerona for the Thomson Line in 1911, wrecked off Newfoundland on 13 June 1918
- RMS Ascania (1923), a Cunard liner that became the armed merchant cruiser HMS Ascania in World War II.
