= HX convoys =

Naval convoy series during World War II

- Part of The Battle of the Atlantic of the Second World War
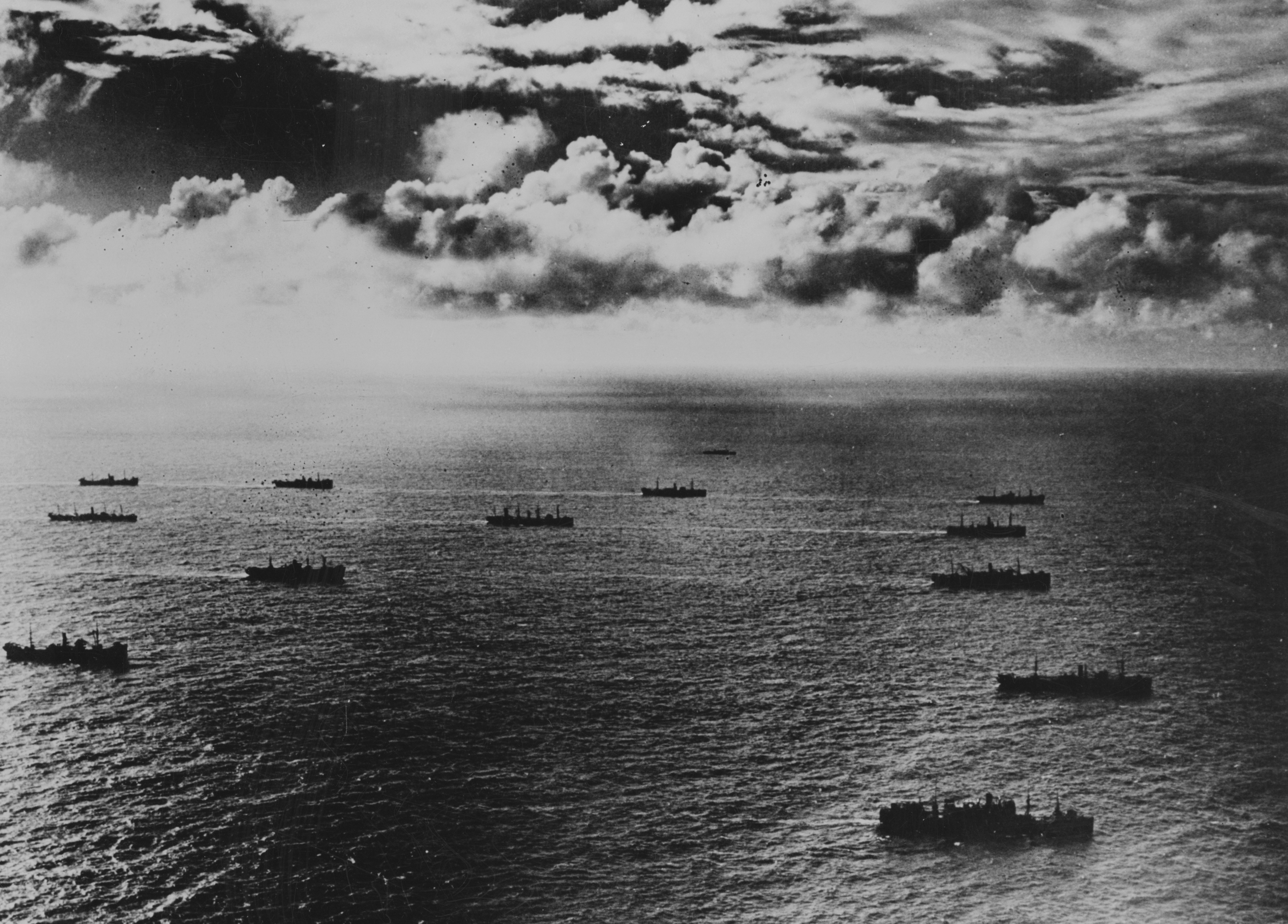
- Atlantic convoy underway c. 1942
Date	September 1939 – May 1945
Location	Atlantic Ocean
Result	Allied victory

HX convoys were transatlantic convoys in the North Atlantic during the First World War and in the Battle of the Atlantic in the Second World War. HX convoys sailed eastwards from Halifax, Nova Scotia in Canada, to Liverpool and other ports in Britain. They rendezvoused with BHX convoys from Bermuda en route. After the United States entered the war, HX convoys began at New York.

The HX series consisted of 377 convoys, with 17,744 ships. Thirty-eight convoys were attacked (about 10 per cent), with the loss of 110 ships in convoy; sixty stragglers were sunk and 36 lost while detached or after dispersal, with losses from marine accident and other causes, for a total loss of 206 ships or about 1 per cent of the total.

== Background ==
An HX series had run in the Atlantic Campaign of the First World War in 1917 and 1918. HX convoys were revived in 1939 at the beginning of the Battle of the Atlantic and were run until the end, the longest continuous series of the war. HX 1 sailed on 16 September 1939 with 18 merchant ships, escorted by the Royal Canadian Navy destroyers HMCS St. Laurent and Saguenay to a North Atlantic rendezvous with Royal Navy heavy cruisers HMS Berwick and York. HX 358 sailed on 23 May 1945 and arrived at Liverpool on 6 June 1945. HX convoys were initially considered fast and made up of ships that could make 9–13 kn (17–24 km/h; 10–15 mph), the voyage from New York to Liverpool taking an average of 15.2 days. A parallel series of slow convoys (SC), was run for ships making 7.7–8 kn (14.3–14.8 km/h; 8.9–9.2 mph), which took about 15.4 days from Sydney, Nova Scotia.

Ships making more than 13 kn (24 km/h; 15 mph) sailed independently; CU (Caribbean to United Kingdom) series were organised in 1943, most being US war-built tankers of 15 kn (28 km/h; 17 mph)+, which later included troop transports and fast merchant ships. Outbound convoys were usually slower than return convoys and summer voyages usually faster than those in winter. Delays for diversions and bad weather could lead to escort vessels at the ocean rendezvous running low on fuel and having to return. A convoy that went way off course or encountered unusually stormy or foggy weather would be lucky to make rendezvous with its escorts. The largest convoy of the Second World War was Convoy HX 300 which sailed from New York to Britain on 25 July 1944, with 166 merchant ships, arriving at Liverpool without incident, on 3 August 1944.

== Convoy battles ==
Map showing the north Atlantic

- Convoy HX 79 Attacked by a U-boat Wolfpack in October 1940. Twelve ships were lost, which, with the attack on Convoy SC 7 on the same day, made 19 October and the night of 19/20 October 1940 the worst period for shipping losses of the Battle of the Atlantic.
- Convoy HX 84 Attacked on 5 November 1940 by the German heavy cruiser Admiral Scheer. Five ships were quickly sunk but the sacrifice of HMS Jervis Bay an armed merchant cruiser and the armed merchant ship SS Beaverford along with failing light, allowed the rest of the convoy to escape. The oil tanker San Demetrio was part of the convoy.
- Convoy HX 106 On 8 February 1941 two German battlecruisers, Scharnhorst and Gneisenau appeared over the horizon. The presence of the escorting battleship HMS Ramillies deterred an attack.
- Convoy HX 112 Attacked in March 1941, this battle was notable for seeing the loss to the Kriegsmarine (German navy) of two of its U-boat aces, Otto Kretschmer and Joachim Schepke.
- Convoy HX 156 was being escorted by the United States Navy in October, 1941, when U-552 torpedoed USS Reuben James, the first US warship sunk in the Second World War.
- Convoy HX 212 suffered the worst loss of an HX convoy in 1942.
- Convoy HX 228 was one of several convoys attacked during March 1943. Two U-boats were destroyed while sinking four merchant ships and the escort commander's destroyer.
- Convoys HX 229/SC 122. Attacked in March 1943, this action converged with the operation around Convoy SC 122 and became the largest convoy battle of the Atlantic campaign.

== HX convoy statistics ==
Sinkings of merchant ships in HX convoys
	No. HX	No. ships	Sunk	Straggled sunk	Non-convoy sunk	Total	%
1939	22	431	1	—	2	3	0.70
1940	91	3,424	48	22	24	94	2.75
1941	70	3,050	21	18	7	46	1.51
1942	54	1,811	8	6	3	17	0.94
1943	53	2,958	27	14	—	41	1.39
1944	55	4,085	2	—	—	2	0.05
1945	32	1,985	3	—	—	3	0.15
Total	377	17,774	110	60	36	206	1.16
