= HMAS Jervis Bay =

Two ships of the Royal Australian Navy have been named HMAS Jervis Bay, for Jervis Bay on the south coast of New South Wales.

- HMAS Jervis Bay (GT 203), a roll-on/roll-off ferry acquired by the RAN in 1977, used as a logistics and training ship, and sold back into civilian service in 1994.
- HMAS Jervis Bay (AKR 45), a wave piercing catamaran acquired in 1999, used as a fast troop transport, and returned to civilian service in 2001.

== Battle honours ==
One battle honour has been awarded to ships named HMAS Jervis Bay:

- East Timor 1999–2000

== See also ==
- HMS Jervis Bay (F40), a British armed merchant cruiser operated during World War II
