= Edward Fegen =

English Royal Navy officer (1891–1940)

Edward Fegen VC SGM
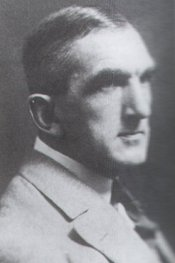
- Edward Fegen
- Born: 8 October 1891; Southsea, Hampshire, England
- Died: 5 November 1940 (aged 49); HMS Jervis Bay, Atlantic Ocean
- Military career
- Allegiance: United Kingdom
- Branch: Royal Navy
- Service years: 1904–1940
- Rank: Captain
- Commands: HMS Jervis Bay (1940); HMS Curlew (1939); HMS Dragon (1938); HMS Dauntless (1935); HMS Osprey (1932–34); HMS Forres (1926–27); HMS Volunteer (1924); HMS Somme (1922–24)
- Conflicts: First World War; Second World War: Atlantic War; HX convoys; Convoy HX 84 †
- Awards: Victoria Cross; Sea Gallantry Medal (Silver)

Captain Edward Stephen Fogarty Fegen, VC, SGM (8 October 1891 – 5 November 1940) was a Royal Navy officer and a recipient of the Victoria Cross, the highest award for gallantry in the face of the enemy that can be awarded to British and Commonwealth forces.

== Early life ==
Edward Stephen Fogarty Fegen was one of four children born into a naval family, his father being Vice-Admiral F. F. Fegen MVO. He was born at 42 Nightingale Rd, Southsea, Hampshire, on 8 October 1891. At the age of 12, he entered Royal Naval College, Osborne and, in 1909, he was appointed midshipman on HMS Dreadnought.

== First World War ==
On 24 March 1918, while the British ship SS War Knight was proceeding up the English Channel in convoy, she collided with the United States oil carrier O.B. Jennings. It appears that the naphtha, which was on board the latter vessel, ignited, and the two ships and surrounding water were soon enveloped in flames. The master of O.B. Jennings gave orders that all the ship's available boats should be lowered, those on the starboard side were burnt, and the crew abandoned the ship in the port boats, whilst the master, chief engineer, chief officer and three others remained on board. HMS Garland, under the command of Lieutenant Fegen, with other destroyers, was proceeding to the spot to render assistance, when it was seen that one boat which had been lowered from O.B. Jennings had been swamped. Garland closed with O.B. Jennings, rescued the men from the swamped boat, and then proceeded alongside the ship, which was still blazing, and rescued those who were still on board. She afterwards proceeded to pick up the others who had left the ship in boats, rescuing in all four officers and twenty-two men. Lieutenant Fegen handled his ship in a very able manner under difficult conditions during the rescue of the survivors, while Quartermaster Driscoll worked the helm and saw that all orders to the engine-room were correctly carried out, and his actions during this rescue resulted in both being awarded Silver Sea Gallantry Medals.

== Interwar service ==
A little later in his naval career, Fegen was seconded to the Royal Australian Navy, and during 1928–29, served as executive officer in the Royal Australian Naval College at Jervis Bay, on the south coast of New South Wales. By coincidence, the vessel on which he later achieved fame (and death) was named after this bay.

== Second World War ==
He was 49 years old, and an acting captain in the Royal Navy during the Second World War when the following deed took place for which he was awarded the VC.

On 5 November 1940 in the Atlantic, Captain Fegen, commanding the armed merchantman HMS Jervis Bay, was escorting 38 ships of Convoy HX 84, when they were attacked by the German heavy cruiser Admiral Scheer (often termed a "pocket battleship"). Captain Fegen immediately engaged the enemy head-on, thus giving the ships of the convoy time to scatter. Out-gunned and on fire Jervis Bay maintained the unequal fight for 22 minutes, although the captain's right arm was shattered, and even after he died when the bridge was shot from under him. He went down with his ship but 31 ships of the convoy managed to escape – including San Demetrio.

He was remembered in Winston Churchill's broadcast speech on 13 May 1945 "Five years of War", as having defended Ireland's honour:

When I think of these days I think also of other episodes and personalities. I do not forget Lieutenant-Commander Esmonde, V.C., D.S.O., Lance-Corporal Kenneally, V.C., Captain Fegen, V.C., and other Irish heroes that I could easily recite, and all bitterness by Britain for the Irish race dies in my heart. I can only pray that in years which I shall not see, the shame will be forgotten and the glories will endure, and that the peoples of the British Isles and of the British Commonwealth of Nations will walk together in mutual comprehension and forgiveness.

The citation for Fegen's Victoria Cross was published in the London Gazette on 22 November 1940, reading:

The KING has been graciously pleased to approve the award of the VICTORIA CROSS to the late Commander (acting Captain) Edward Stephen Fogarty Fegen, Royal Navy for valour in challenging hopeless odds and giving his life to save the many ships it was his duty to protect. On the 5th of November, 1940, in heavy seas, Captain Fegen, in His Majesty's Armed Merchant Cruiser Jervis Bay, was escorting thirty-eight Merchantmen. Sighting a powerful German warship he at once drew clear of the Convoy, made straight for the Enemy, and brought his ship between the Raider and her prey, so that they might scatter and escape. Crippled, in flames, unable to reply, for nearly an hour the Jervis Bay held the German's fire. So she went down, but of the Merchantmen all but four or five were saved.

== In popular culture ==
Issue #47 of the comic book Hitman by Garth Ennis and John McCrea contains a fictionalized account of Fegen's last battle and the sinking of the Jervis Bay.
