= Arthur Edwards (photographer) =

British photographer (born 1940)

Arthur Edwards MBE
- Born: Arthur John Edwards; 12 August 1940 (age 86); London, United Kingdom
- Education: St Bernard's Grammar School; Anglia Ruskin University
- Occupation: Photographer
- Employer: The Sun
- Known for: Taking photographs of the British royal family
- Spouse: Ann (m. 1961; died 2022)
- Children: 3

Arthur Edwards (born 12 August 1940) is a British photographer, working for The Sun newspaper, who specialises in pictures of the British royal family, with whom he has toured often.

== Early life and education ==
Arthur Edwards was born on 12 August 1940, and educated at St Bernard's Catholic Grammar School, Stepney, London. His mother worked as a cleaner and bought him his first camera, after saving from her wages.

He joined The Sun in 1975, and has continued to work with the newspaper for over 40 years.

== Personal life ==
Edwards was married to Ann from 1961 until her death in 2022. They had three children.

He appeared as a castaway on the BBC Radio programme Desert Island Discs on 25 September 2011.

Edwards was appointed a Member of the Order of the British Empire (MBE) in 2003 for "outstanding service to newspapers" and was awarded an honorary doctorate by Anglia Ruskin University in 2012.

== Bibliography ==
- —— (1993). I'll Tell The Jokes Arthur: Diana, the Royal Family and Me. John Blake Publishing Ltd. ISBN 978-1857820492.
- —— (2007). Magic Moments: The Greatest Royal Photographs of All Time. John Blake Publishing Ltd. ISBN 978-1844544820.
  - —— (2011). Arthur Edwards' Magic Moments: The Sun's Greatest Royal Photographs of All Time. Metro Books. ISBN 978-1843584131.
  - —— (2013). Arthur Edwards' Magical Memories: The Greatest Royal Photographs of All Time. John Blake Publishing Ltd. ISBN 978-1782194798.
- —— (2022). Behind the Crown: My Life Photographing the Royal Family. HarperCollins. ISBN 978-0008581138.
- —— (2026). Cup of Tea, Arthur?: My Extraordinary 50 Years Photographing the Royal Family. HarperCollins. ISBN 978-0008844417.
