= Convoy HX 84 =

Convoy during naval battles of the Second World War

- Part of World War II
| Date | 5 November 1940 |
| Location | North Atlantic |
| Result | German victory |

Belligerents
| Germany | United Kingdom Canada |

Commanders and leaders
| (Nazi Germany) Theodor Krancke | (United Kingdom) E.S.F. Fegen † |

Strength
| 1 heavy cruiser | 38 merchant ships 3 escorts (1 during attack) |

Casualties and losses
| None | 5 merchants sunk 1 merchant damaged 1 escort sunk (1 merchant sunk post-dispersal) |

Convoy HX 84 was the 84th of the numbered series of Allied North Atlantic HX convoys of merchant ships from Halifax, Nova Scotia, and Bermuda to Liverpool, England, during the Battle of the Atlantic. Thirty-eight ships escorted by the armed merchant cruiser HMS Jervis Bay departed from Halifax on 28 October 1940, eastbound to Liverpool.

== Background ==
On the morning of 5 November, HX 84 had been passed by the cargo liner Mopan, which was also bound for Liverpool, enroute from Port Antonio, during which an offer had been made to Mopan's Master, Captain Sapsworth, for Mopan to join HX 84. However, the offer had been declined and Mopan continued eastbound alone.

=== Mopan ===
Having been thwarted from using its Arado Ar 196 seaplane the previous day, on 5 November the weather was suitable for Admiral Scheer to utilise its air reconnaissance. A seaplane was launched at 09:40hrs having been ordered to make a sweep 100 nautical miles (190 km; 120 mi) wide and 70 nautical miles (130 km; 81 mi) deep. When the seaplane returned at 12:05 the observer reported having sighted a convoy steaming eastbound at position 52°41′N 32°52′W. This meant that the intervening distance between Admiral Scheer and the convoy was approximately 90 nautical miles (170 km; 100 mi). No escort had been observed. This confirmed the earlier B-Dienst radio intercept by Admiral Scheer which had identified the convoy as being HX 84.

Onboard Admiral Scheer a dilemma was presented to Kapitän zur See Theodor Krancke regarding whether he should attack the convoy before nightfall, or wait and make his attack at dawn the following day. Kapitän Krancke made the decision to attack, with Admiral Scheer altering course onto 150 degrees and increasing speed to 23 knots (43 km/h; 26 mph) allowing Krancke to intercept at approximately 15:30.

At 14:27, an hour before Admiral Scheer was scheduled to intercept the convoy, a single smoke column was observed. Once visual acquisition had been made a flag could be observed flying from the vessel's masthead, however the purpose of this could not be established. Unsure as to the identity of the vessel Krancke decided to maintain his course, as to turn away to the east would significantly reduce his ability to intercept HX 84 before darkness fell.

The vessel was Mopan, by this time approximately three hours ahead of HX 84. On the bridge of Admiral Scheer, as the range decreased, it was decided that the vessel was an armed merchantman, acting as a screen, and stationed ahead or on the flank of the convoy. Krancke trained all his armament on to Mopan with Admiral Scheer firing warning shots from her secondary armament of 15 cm (5.9 in) SK C/28 guns, which exploded close to the freighter's bow. At 15:08, by use of a signal lamp, the Admiral Scheer ordered Mopan to heave to.

Admiral Scheer then proceeded to hoist a flag signal stating "Take to your boats and bring your papers across." Krancke kept his guns trained on Mopan's wireless transmission aerials on her masthead and accompanied this with an order that the ship's wireless was not to be used. This caused some rancour onboard Mopan with her wireless officer, James Macintosh, on more than one occasion pleading with Captain Sapsworth to ignore the request from Admiral Scheer and transmit the internationally recognised signal: R-R-R "(I Am Being Attacked By A Raider)," thereby affording Convoy HX 84 the ability to take some form of evasive action.

However, with the guns of Admiral Scheer trained on the Mopan and unwilling to sacrifice himself to give the convoy a chance, Sapsworth refused Macintosh's pleas and instead ordered his ship's company to abandon ship, upon when they would transfer to Admiral Scheer in order to be taken prisoner. The order was carried out in a measured and organised manner, something that was not lost on Krancke. Following the evacuation of Mopan, Admiral Scheer proceeded to sink the vessel. However, this proved to be a more difficult task than was initially envisaged.

If he was to make a successful interception of HX 84 before nightfall, Krancke knew that time was beginning to run short. No prize crew was sent to Mopan, instead Admiral Scheer opened fire on the merchantman from a distance of approximately 300 yards (270 m) using a combination of her secondary armament of 15 cm guns and her main armament of 28 cm (11 in) SK C/28 guns. Vexed by the continued stubbornness of Mopan, Krancke ordered an increase in the rate of fire from the Admiral Scheer's gunners in addition to which he requested the presence of Captain Sapsworth, who cautioned against the targeting of the aft end of his ship as it was where the ammunition for Mopan's 4-inch (102 mm) gun was stored. Mopan finally sank at 16:05.

== Interception ==
=== Jervis Bay ===
Almost two hours had been lost by Admiral Scheer having devoted time to Mopan and the onset of dusk arrived as the cruiser closed with the convoy, a situation that caused significant annoyance to Krancke.

As HX 84 appeared before Admiral Scheer Captain E.S.F. Fegen of Jervis Bay sailed clear of the convoy and attacked the raider so as to cause as much delay as possible, and to allow the convoy to scatter. Incensed with the earlier delay and the approach from the Jervis Bay, Krancke was determined to sink the British vessel.

Jervis Bay was sunk after 20 minutes of fighting with the loss of 190 of her crew. Nevertheless, their sacrifice allowed the convoy to begin to escape.

=== Beaverford ===
The merchant ship SS Beaverford, armed with only two guns, reportedly engaged Admiral Scheer in a cat-and-mouse gunnery duel that lasted for over four hours before Beaverford was sunk with all hands, allowing most of the convoy to complete their escape. However, given that the convoy ships were scattering in all directions, it is unlikely that anyone on another ship could have reliably seen all of this. The story is also contradicted by the account Admiral Scheer's captain wrote after the war. Krancke paid generous tribute to the courage of Jervis Bay, and of a small burning freighter that fired back just before she sank (this must have been Kenbane Head). He did not mention any battle with Beaverford, which he records only as a ship carrying a deck cargo of timber that Admiral Scheer caught up with as it fled at speed far to the south of the main action. When finally caught, Beaverford proved hard to sink by gunfire, and was therefore torpedoed to save ammunition. There is no mention of any fight or any return fire from Beaverford, and far from being a four or five hour battle, Beaverford was attacked only 50 minutes after Kenbane Head and about an hour before Admiral Scheer caught up with Fresno City. There was no time for any such battle. The sinking of Beaverford was witnessed from Fresno City, also fleeing south. Her captain's log recorded: "The Beaverford, bearing 110 degrees East South East was attacked and set on fire, distant about 10 miles".

=== Other ships ===
Maiden, Trewellard, Kenbane Head, and Fresno City were sunk and the tanker San Demetrio damaged, but failing light now allowed the rest of the convoy to escape. San Demetrio was abandoned by her crew, but two days later some of the crew, now in lifeboats, sighted San Demetrio, still afloat and still ablaze. They reboarded her, got the engines running, and brought her in to port. This incident later formed the basis for the script of the film San Demetrio London. The largest ship in the convoy, RMS Rangitiki, was straddled by heavy shells but escaped without casualties amongst her 230 crew and 25 passengers, including women and children; her radio officer was able to transmit a warning signal that was picked up and repeated by a station in Long Island. Admiral Scheer was only able to sink six of the 38 ships in the convoy.

== Aftermath ==
The time Admiral Scheer spent to intercept, evacuate and sink Mopan, followed by the actions involving Jervis Bay and Beaverford, undoubtedly enabled HX 84 to escape extensive destruction. Though failing to warn HX 84 of the threat, Sapsworth succeeded in delaying an attack on the convoy by ordering the slow and orderly evacuation of Mopan.

A monument to Jervis Bay was unveiled on 5 November 1941 at Albouy's Point in the City of Hamilton, Bermuda, in front of a Guard of Honour provided by the Royal Marines detachment of HMS Despatch, by Vice Admiral Sir Charles Kennedy-Purvis, Commander-in-Chief of the America and West Indies Station.

== Ships in the convoy ==
=== Allied merchant ships ===
A total of 38 merchant vessels joined the convoy, either in Halifax or later in the voyage (convoys formed at Bermuda, coded BHX merged on the ocean with the convoys from Halifax as it was easier to protect one large convoy than two smaller ones). Five merchant ships were sunk when the unified convoy was attacked, with one more sunk after the convoy dispersed.

| Name | Flag | Tonnage (GRT) | Notes |
|---|---|---|---|
| Andalusian (1918) | United Kingdom | 3,082 | |
| Anna Bulgaris (1912) | Greece | 4,603 | |
| Athelempress (1930) | United Kingdom | 8,941 | Joined ex-BHX 84 |
| Atheltemplar (1930) | United Kingdom | 8,992 | Joined ex-BHX 84 |
| Beaverford (1928) | United Kingdom | 10,042 | Sunk by Admiral Scheer |
| Briarwood (1930) | United Kingdom | 4,019 | |
| Castilian (1919) | United Kingdom | 3,067 | |
| Cetus (1920) | Norway | 2,614 | |
| Cordelia (1932) | United Kingdom | 8,190 | Joined ex-BHX 84. Returned post-dispersal |
| Cornish City (1936) | United Kingdom | 4,952 | |
| Dan-Y-Bryn (1940) | United Kingdom | 5,117 | |
| Danae Ii (1936) | United Kingdom | 2,660 | |
| Delhi (1925) | Sweden | 4,571 | Joined ex-BHX 84 |
| Delphinula (1939) | United Kingdom | 8,120 | |
| Emile Francqui (1929) | Belgium | 5,859 | |
| Empire Penguin (1919) | United Kingdom | 6,389 | |
| Erodona (1937) | United Kingdom | 6,207 | |
| Fresno City (1929) | United Kingdom | 4,955 | Sunk by Admiral Scheer |
| Hjalmar Wessel (1935) | Norway | 1,742 | |
| James J Maguire (1939) | United Kingdom | 10,525 | |
| Kenbane Head (1919) | United Kingdom | 5,225 | Sunk by Admiral Scheer |
| Lancaster Castle (1937) | United Kingdom | 5,172 | |
| Maidan (1925) | United Kingdom | 7,908 | Sunk by Admiral Scheer |
| Morska Wola (1924) | Poland | 3,208 | |
| Oilreliance (1929) | United Kingdom | 5,666 | Joined ex-BHX 84 |
| Pacific Enterprise (1927) | United Kingdom | 6,736 | Jx BHX 84 |
| Persier (1918) | Belgium | 5,382 | |
| Puck (1935) | Poland | 1,065 | |
| Rangitiki (1929) | United Kingdom | 16,698 | |
| Saint Gobain (1936) | Sweden | 9,959 | Joined ex-BHX 84 |
| San Demetrio (1938) | United Kingdom | 8,073 | afloat but ablaze, later recovered |
| Solfonn (1939) | Norway | 9,925 | Joined ex-BHX 84 |
| Sovac (1938) | United Kingdom | 6,724 | |
| Stureholm (1919) | Sweden | 4,575 | Returned to Halifax post-dispersal |
| Trefusis (1918) | United Kingdom | 5,299 | |
| Trewellard (1936) | United Kingdom | 5,201 | Sunk by Admiral Scheer |
| Varoy (1892) | Norway | 1,531 | |
| Vingaland (1935) | Sweden | 2,734 | Sunk by Luftwaffe aircraft post-dispersal west of County Donegal |

=== Convoy escorts ===
A series of armed military ships escorted the convoy at various times during its journey, with only one present when the Germans attacked.

| Name | Flag | Type | Joined | Left |
|---|---|---|---|---|
| HMCS Columbia | Royal Canadian Navy | Town-class destroyer | 28 October 1940 | 29 October 1940 |
| HMS Jervis Bay | Royal Navy | Armed merchant cruiser | 28 October 1940 | 5 November 1940; Sunk by Admiral Scheer |
| HMCS St. Francis | Royal Canadian Navy | Town-class destroyer | 28 October 1940 | 29 October 1940 |

== Bibliography ==
- Hague, Arnold (2000). The Allied Convoy System 1939–1945. ISBN 1-86176-147-3.
- Krancke, Theodor; Brennecke, Hans (1956). The Battleship 'Scheer'.
- Krancke, Theodor; Brennecke, HJ (1958). Pocket Battleship. New York: W. W. Norton & Company.
- MacNeil, Calum (1957). San Demetrio.
- van der Vat, Dan (1988). The Atlantic Campaign. ISBN 0-340-37751-8.
