= SS Beaverford =

British cargo ship

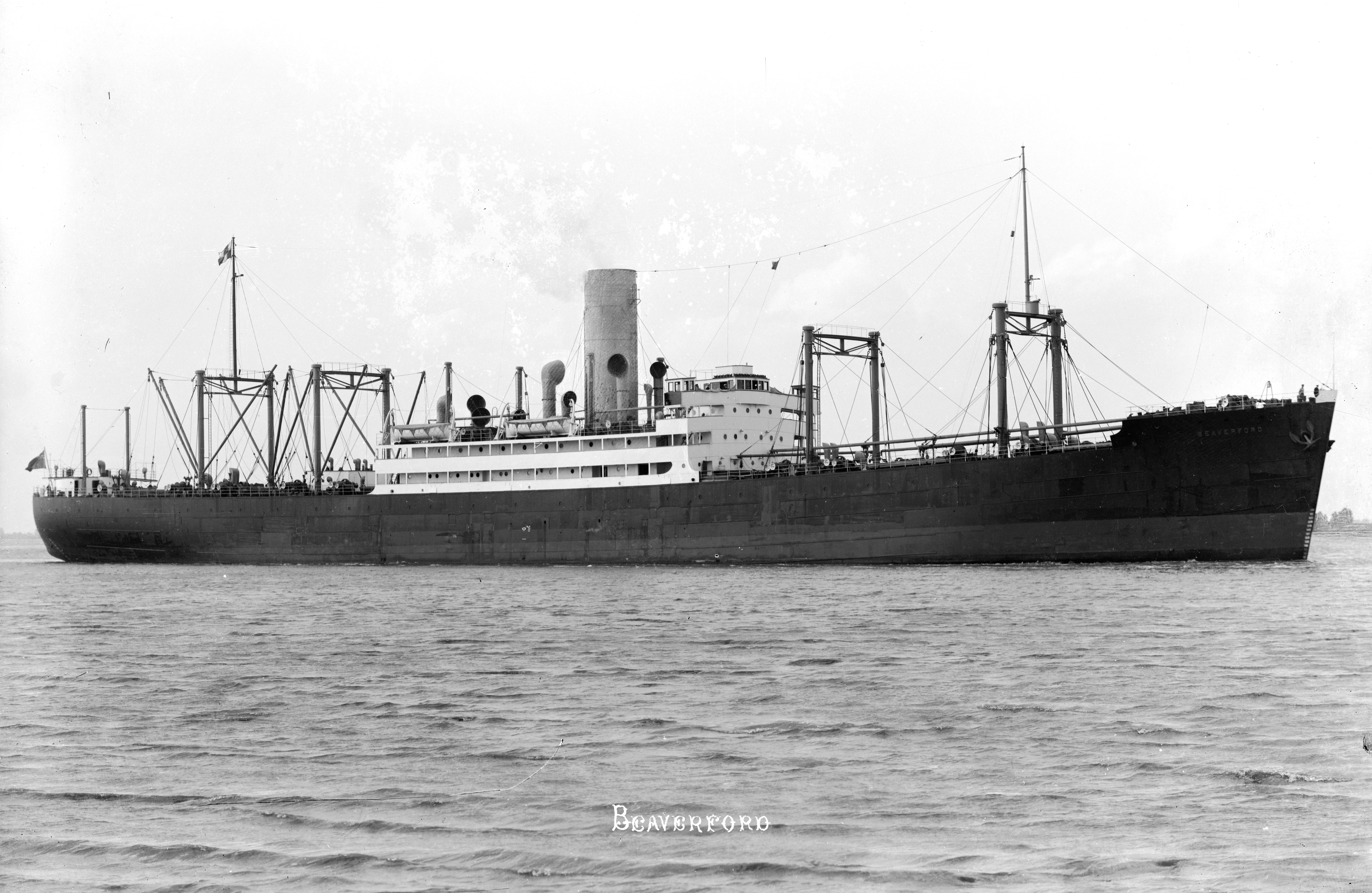
- Beaverford

History
- Name: Beaverford
- Owner: Canadian Pacific Railway
- Operator: Canadian Pacific Steamships
- Port of registry: London (United Kingdom)
- Route: London to Montreal (Apr–Nov), London to Saint John, New Brunswick and Halifax (Nov–Apr)
- Builder: Barclay, Curle & Co, Glasgow
- Yard number: 617
- Launched: 27 October 1927
- Maiden voyage: 21 January 1928
- Identification: UK official number 149983; Code letters LBCS (until 1933); Call sign GNMB (from 1934)
- Fate: Sunk 5 November 1940

General characteristics
- Type: Cargo liner
- Tonnage: 10,042 GRT; tonnage under deck 9,259; 6,060 NRT
- Length: 503 ft (153 m)
- Beam: 61.8 ft (18.8 m)
- Draught: 29 ft 11 in (9.12 m)
- Depth: 37.5 ft (11.4 m)
- Ice class: Strengthened for navigation in ice
- Installed power: 1,574 NHP
- Propulsion: 6 × steam turbines, 2 × screws
- Speed: 15 kn (28 km/h)
- Capacity: 12 passengers
- Crew: 77 including 2 DEMS gunners (1940)
- Sensors & processing systems: direction finding equipment; echo sounding equipment
- Armament: 1940: 1 × 4-inch gun; 1 × 3-inch gun

SS Beaverford was a cargo liner registered in the United Kingdom and operated by the Canadian Pacific Steamship Company. She was built in 1928 for service between Montreal and London.

In the Second World War Beaverford took part in North Atlantic convoys from Canada to the UK. Her final voyage was with Convoy HX 84, which dispersed on 5 November 1940 when the German cruiser Admiral Scheer attacked it. Scheer shelled and torpedoed Beaverford, sinking her with all hands.

== Construction ==
Beaverford was the first of a class of five cargo ships built for Canadian Pacific in 1927 and 1928. Her sister ships were Beaverdale, Beaverburn, Beaverhill and Beaverbrae. They were designed to carry 10,000 tons deadweight (DWT) of cargo and 12 passengers. They were fitted with 80,000 cubic feet (2,300 m^{3}) feet of insulated cargo space and 20,000 cubic feet (570 m^{3}) of refrigerated cargo spaces for meat and fruit. Barclay, Curle & Co of Glasgow launched Beaverford on 27 October 1927 and completed her on 21 January 1928.

The ship was fitted with Erith-Roe mechanical stokers, the first automatic stokers in the Merchant Navy of the United Kingdom. They fed six corrugated furnaces with a combined grate area of 397 square feet (37 m^{2}). These heated two single-ended boilers and four water-tube boilers with a combined heating surface of 17,796 square feet (1,653 m^{2}). The boilers supplied steam at 250 pounds per square inch (1,700 kPa) to six Parsons steam turbines whose combined power output was rated at 1,574 nominal horsepower. The turbines drove twin screws via single-reduction gearing. They were among the most efficient steam engines of their time.

== Identification ==
Beaverford's United Kingdom official number was 149983. When completed she was given the code letters LBCS. In 1934 code letters were superseded by radio call signs and Beaverford was given the call sign GNMB.

== Pre-war service ==
The "Beaver" ships maintained a fast cargo schedule between London and Montreal in the summer and London and Saint John, New Brunswick and Halifax, Nova Scotia in the winter. They were registered in London and had mostly British crews. Beaverford was adopted by Downhills Central School in Tottenham via the British Ships Adoption Society. School pupils toured the ship when it was in port and the ship's officers visited the school. On 2 July 1938 Beaverford rescued 400 passengers from the Cunard liner Ascania, which had run aground in the Saint Lawrence River near Bic Island, Quebec.

== War service ==
With the onset of war, the fast and modern "Beaver" ships were requisitioned by the UK Admiralty to carry high-value stores. On 16 September 1939, just a fortnight into the war, Beaverford sailed in HX 1, the first convoy of the war to leave from Halifax. Early in 1940 she was fitted with two naval guns: a four-inch gun on her stern and a three-inch gun on her bow, to make her a defensively equipped merchant ship. She remained owned by Canadian Pacific with a Merchant Navy crew, supplemented by two DEMS gunners. By the autumn of 1940 she had made 16 crossings of the North Atlantic and had survived a U-Boat attack on convoy HX 55 in July 1940.

== Final voyage and loss ==
Beaverford sailed from Halifax, Nova Scotia on 28 October 1940, as part of Convoy HX 84. She was carrying refined aluminum and copper, maize, meats and cheese and a large cargo of ammunition in her holds along with a deck cargo of crated aircraft and timber. Beaverford had a crew of 77. Most were from Britain but three were Canadians including one of her two gunners. She was commanded by the 60-year-old Captain Hugh Pettigrew from Coatbridge, who had sailed with Canadian Pacific since 1910, was a veteran of naval actions at Gallipoli, and as a First Officer had survived the torpedoing of Medora by SM U-86 west-southwest of Mull of Galloway in 1918.

On 5 November Convoy HX 84 was midway across the Atlantic when the German pocket battleship Admiral Scheer located and attacked it. The attack began at 17:15. The convoy's only escort, the armed merchant cruiser HMS Jervis Bay, ordered the convoy to scatter. In an engagement that won the commander of Jervis Bay a posthumous Victoria Cross, the escort steered directly towards Admiral Scheer. Hopelessly outgunned, Jervis Bay was set afire and sank 22 minutes later. Admiral Scheer now began to attack the convoy, first sinking the freighter Maidan with all hands. The tanker San Demetrio was set on fire but did not sink. Admiral Scheer next sank the freighters Trewellard and Kenbane Head.

Beaverford had fled south, but Admiral Scheer caught her up and illuminated her with starshell. Beaverford transmitted a final wireless message: "It is our turn now. So long. The captain and crew of SS Beaverford".

Admiral Scheer fired 83 shells at Beaverford. 71 were from its 150 mm guns, with 16 hitting the freighter, and 12 were from the cruiser's 280 mm main guns, with three hits. The shelling was observed and recorded in the log aboard the freighter Fresno City, ten miles off and also fleeing south. Beaverford was badly damaged, but the cargo of timber on her deck kept her afloat, and to save ammunition Admiral Scheer's commander, KzS Theodor Krancke, ordered that she be finished off with a torpedo. The torpedo hit the fore part of Beaverford, lifting her bow and detonating the ammunition in her hold. The ship blew apart and the stern was last seen sliding into the ocean. All aboard were killed.

It was now completely dark, but Admiral Scheer went on to find and sink one more ship, Fresno City, from which the attack on Beaverford had been observed an hour before. Admiral Scheer sank six of the 38 ships from the convoy.

== Recognition ==
In 1944 an article supposedly based on accounts from one of the other ships in Convoy HX 84 was written by Norman Mackintosh, published in the magazine Canada's Weekly and republished in the Evening Standard in London which praised the sacrifice of Beaverford: "For more than four hours she was afloat, followed by the raider, firing and fighting to the last. Using the big reserve of engine power for speed, and superb seamanship for steering and manoeuvering to baffle and evade the enemy's aim, for all that time she held her own, hit by shells but firing back and delaying the raider hour by hour while the rest of the convoy made their escape."

However, given that the convoy ships were scattering in all directions, it is unlikely that anyone on another ship could have reliably seen all of this. The story is also contradicted by the account Admiral Scheer's captain wrote after the war. Krancke paid generous tribute to the courage of Jervis Bay, and of a small burning freighter that fired back just before she sank (this must have been Kenbane Head). But he did not mention any battle with Beaverford, which he records only as a ship carrying a deck cargo of timber that Admiral Scheer caught up with as it fled at speed far to the south of the main action. When finally caught, Beaverford proved hard to sink by gunfire, and was therefore torpedoed to save ammunition.

The sinking of Beaverford was witnessed from Fresno City, also fleeing south. Her captain's log recorded: "The Beaverford, bearing 110 degrees East South East was attacked and set on fire, distant about 10 miles". There is no mention of any fight or any return fire from Beaverford, and far from being a four or five hour battle, Beaverford was attacked only 50 minutes after Kenbane Head and about an hour before Scheer caught up with Fresno City. There was no time for any such battle.

Some writers complain that Beaverford received no official recognition for its role in the battle, but that may be because the story only emerged years later, and is unsupported by credible evidence.

== Memorials ==
Tower Hill Memorial, the UK Merchant Navy monument in London, records the names of all 77 members of Beaverford's crew who were killed when she was sunk. The names of the three Canadians in her crew, Clifford Carter, Laughlin Elwood Stewart, William Lane Thibideau, are inscribed on the Sailors' Memorial at Point Pleasant Park in Halifax, Nova Scotia which overlooks the harbour mouth whence Beaverford made her final departure in 1940.

In a special service on 20 May 1944 a painting and memorial plaque were installed at Downhills Central School, which had adopted Beaverford. The plaque read "SS Beaverford, our ship, lost with all hands in action 5th November 1940". The school was closed in 1964 as part of school amalgamations and both the painting and the memorial plaque disappeared. The plaque later turned up in a junk shop.

Captain Pettigrew's widow, HG Pettigrew, was welcomed in Halifax when she immigrated in 1948 and her late husband was lauded as the man "who took over the task of covering the convoy against the German pocket battleship... and gained five hours for the convoy before Beaverford was sank with all hands."

In 1946 Canadian Pacific perpetuated Beaverford's name in the postwar restoration of its fleet when it acquired a replacement ship, Empire Kitchener, which it renamed Beaverford. Under that name she sailed until CP sold her in 1962.

== Bibliography ==
- Edwards, Bernard (2013). Convoy Will Scatter: The Full Story of Jervis Bay and Convoy HX84. Barnsley: Pen and Sword Books. pp. 11–12, 82–83. ISBN 978-1781593769.
- Krancke, Theodor; Brennecke, HJ (1958). Pocket Battleship. New York: W. W. Norton & Company.
- Pigott, Peter (2010). Sailing Seven Seas: A History of the Canadian Pacific Line. Toronto: Dundurn Press. pp. 91, 139–143. ISBN 978-1-55488-836-8.
