= RMS Ascania (1923) =

British ocean liner (1925–1956)

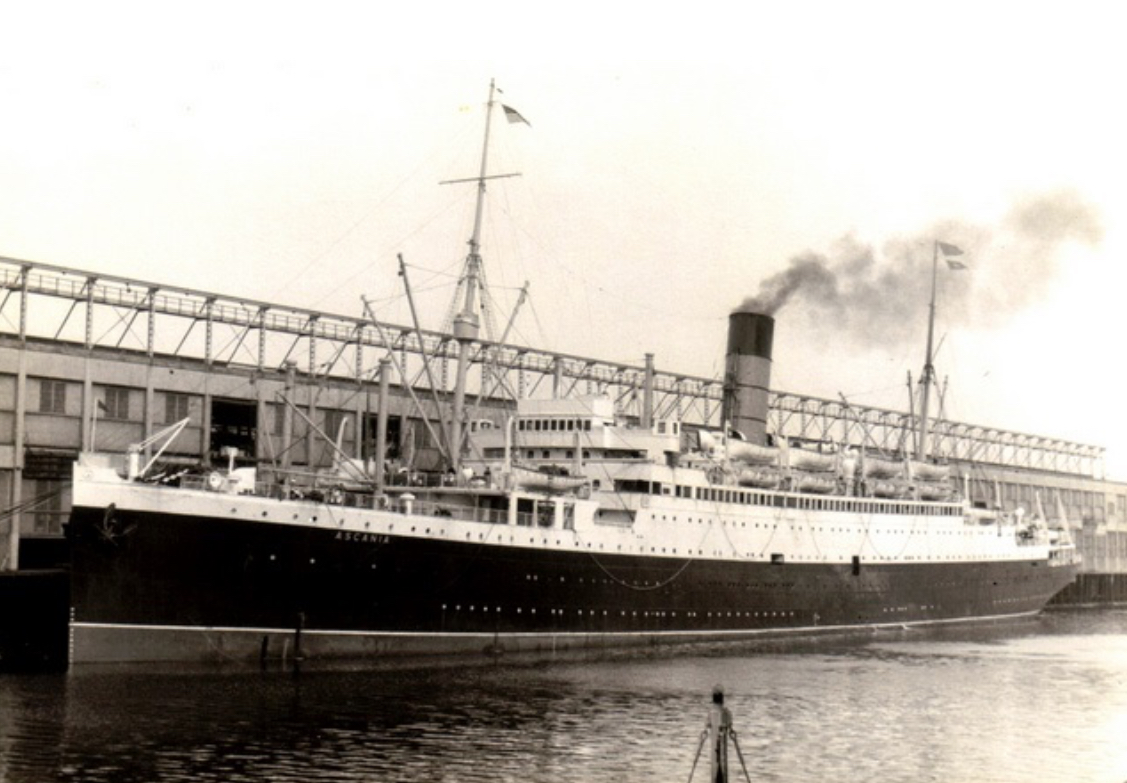
- Ascania at pier 90 in New York

History

United Kingdom
- Name: RMS Ascania
- Owner: Cunard Line
- Port of registry: United Kingdom
- Builder: Armstrong Whitworth, Newcastle-upon-Tyne.
- Yard number: 971
- Launched: 20 December 1923
- Christened: 21 April 1925
- Completed: 2 May 1925
- Maiden voyage: 22 May 1925
- Out of service: December 1956
- Fate: Scrapped at Newport Monmouthshire, by J Cashmore, January 1957.

General characteristics
- Type: Ocean liner
- Tonnage: 14,013 GRT
- Length: 538 ft (164 m)
- Beam: 65.3 ft (19.9 m)
- Decks: 2 decks and shelter deck, forecastle and bridge
- Installed power: Geared turbine engines: 8,500 shp (6,300 kW) (from builders)
- Propulsion: Two propellers
- Speed: 15 knots (28 km/h)
- Capacity: 500 cabin class, 1,200 3rd class passengers (as built)
- Crew: 270

RMS Ascania was an ocean liner operated by the Cunard Line. She was launched on 20 December 1923 at the Armstrong Whitworth Shipbuilders Ltd yard in Newcastle-upon-Tyne; the fifth of Cunard's six A-class liners. Due to unforeseen cost overruns, the vessel was not completed until May 1925. Following service in a number of military roles during the Second World War, she was refitted and returned to civilian use in 1950, finally retiring in 1956.

== Early service ==
Her maiden voyage was between London (cargo)-Southampton-Quebec-Montreal starting on 22 May 1925; she was employed on this route, switching to Halifax, Nova Scotia and New York during the winter, until World War II. In July 1927 her accommodation was altered to cabin, tourist and third class, and in March 1939 to cabin and third class. In December 1934 Ascania rescued the crew of the sinking cargo ship SS Unsworth in mid-Atlantic. Ascania herself ran into trouble on 2 July 1938 when she ran aground in the St. Lawrence River, near Bic Island, Quebec. Her 400 passengers were taken off by the Canadian Pacific cargo liner Beaverford while Ascania's crew remained aboard to refloat the liner which was repaired and returned to service a few months later.

== Wartime service ==
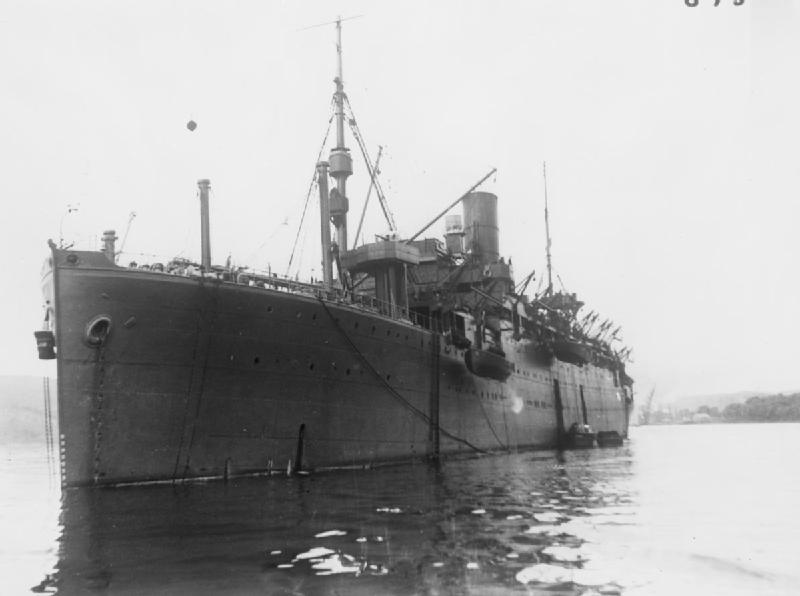
HMS Ascania in 1940

On 24 August 1939, she was taken into naval service and converted into an armed merchant cruiser. Armed with eight 6-inch (152 mm) and two 3-inch (76 mm) naval guns, she became HMS Ascania with the pennant number F68. She sailed with the Halifax Escort Force and later with the North Atlantic Escort Force on convoy protection duty. From November 1941 to September 1942 she deployed to the New Zealand station. In October 1942, she was returned to the UK and was employed as a troopship by the Ministry of War Transport. The following year, Ascania was modified into a Landing Ship Infantry and took part in the Invasion of Sicily in 1943, and the Anzio Landings and landings in the south of France in 1944.

== Post-war ==
Ascania was returned to Cunard and refitted, resuming passenger service on 20 December 1947 on the Liverpool to Halifax route. She underwent a major refit in 1949, to 14,440 gross register tons (GRT) and with accommodation for 200 first and 500 tourist class passengers, and returned to service on 21 April 1950 on the Liverpool-Quebec-Montreal route. Ascania was again taken up as a troopship for the Suez landings and finally retired in December 1956.

== Heritage ==
Ship's bell RMS Ascania

Ascania's bell is on display at the Maritime Museum of the Atlantic in Halifax, Nova Scotia. It is located in the 'Visible Storage' display cases section of the museum on the second floor. In addition, a large cut-away model is displayed at the Canadian Museum of Immigration at Pier 21 next to the landing deck where Ascania once docked.
