= MV San Demetrio =

British ship

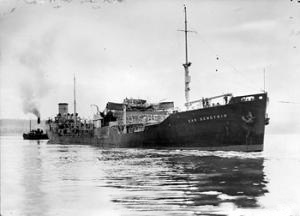
- MV San Demetrio

History

United Kingdom
- Name: San Demetrio
- Namesake: Saint Demetrius of Thessaloniki
- Owner: Eagle Oil & Shipping Co Ltd
- Builder: Blythswood Ship Building Co, Scotstoun
- Yard number: 52
- Launched: 11 October 1938
- Out of service: 1942
- Home port: London
- Identification: UK official number 156023; Call sign GKKW
- Fate: Sunk on 17 March 1942

General characteristics
- Type: Oil tanker
- Tonnage: 8,073 GRT
- Length: 463.2 ft (141.2 m)/479 ft 5 in (146.13 m)
- Beam: 61.2 ft (18.7 m)
- Draught: 27 ft 1/2 in (8.24 m)
- Depth: 33.1 ft (10.1 m)
- Installed power: 502 NHP
- Propulsion: 8-cylinder 4-stroke single-acting marine diesel built by John G. Kincaid & Co Ltd, Greenock
- Speed: 12 knots (22 km/h)
- Complement: 45 officers & men; 8 DEMS gunners
- Armament: 1 × 4.7 inch gun; 1 × 12-pounder gun; 1 × Hotchkiss gun

MV San Demetrio was a British motor tanker, notable for her service during the Second World War. She was built in 1938 for the Eagle Oil and Shipping Company. In 1940 she was damaged by enemy action in mid-Atlantic, abandoned by her crew but later re-boarded and successfully brought into harbour. She was the subject of a 1943 feature film, San Demetrio London, one of the few films that recognised the heroism of the UK Merchant Navy crews during the War.

San Demetrio was one of several motor tankers of about 8,000 GRT built for Eagle Oil and Shipping in the latter 1930s. She was built by the Blythswood Shipbuilding Company of Glasgow, who had also launched her sister ships San Conrado in 1936 and San Cipriano in 1937.

== Convoy HX 84 ==
San Demetrio had loaded 11,200 tons of aviation fuel in Aruba, Dutch West Indies and was bound for Avonmouth, England. She was one of 38 ships that joined Convoy HX 84 for the passage across the North Atlantic and left Halifax, Nova Scotia on 28 October 1940. The Town-class destroyers HMCS Columbia and HMCS St. Francis escorted the convoy out of Canadian home waters but once clear of the coast, the convoy's sole escort was the armed merchant cruiser HMS Jervis Bay – a converted passenger liner that had been armed with seven outdated BL 6 inch Mk VII naval guns and a pair of 3-inch (76 mm) anti-aircraft guns.

== Attack by Admiral Scheer ==
On 5 November 1940, the German cruiser Admiral Scheer found the convoy at 50°30′N 32°00′W and attacked immediately. Captain E.S.F. Fegen of HMS Jervis Bay steamed out towards the raider so as to delay Admiral Scheer to allow the convoy to scatter and escape. Jervis Bay was completely outclassed, but she fought for 22 minutes before she was sunk with the loss of 190 of her crew. Their sacrifice, followed by an alleged four-hour cat-and-mouse battle with the convoy freighter SS Beaverford enabled most of the merchantmen from Convoy HX 84 to escape. Fegen received a posthumous Victoria Cross.

Admiral Scheer now tried to sink as many of the convoy as possible before darkness fell. She hit San Demetrio with several shells that killed look-out Ernest Daines, destroyed the bridge and poop deck and left the upper deck in flames. Despite both the exploding shells and the resultant fire, the ship's highly flammable cargo did not explode. Nevertheless, her Master, Captain Waite, believed that the fire could set off the aviation fuel at any moment so he gave the order to abandon ship. With the ship remaining under fire from Admiral Scheer, the crew escaped in three lifeboats. Admiral Scheer then turned her attention to other ships of the rapidly scattering convoy.

== Re-boarding ==
The lifeboats separated in the night, and the two lifeboats with the captain and twenty-five crew were picked up and taken to Newfoundland. The sixteen men in the other lifeboat, including Second Officer Arthur G. Hawkins and Chief Engineer Charles Pollard, drifted for 24 hours when they sighted a burning ship. To their surprise, they discovered that it was their own ship, San Demetrio. With few alternatives, the crew had to decide whether to risk death by exposure or to re-board and risk the fire. In the end they chose to remain in the lifeboat because the fire was too great and the weather too hazardous to attempt boarding, but after a second night in the boat and enduring a freezing North Atlantic winter gale, they regretted not re-boarding the tanker.

At dawn the following day, 7 November 1940, the San Demetrio was about 5 nautical miles (9 km) downwind so the crew set sail toward her and re-boarded. They fought the fire, repaired the port auxiliary boiler sufficiently to restart the ship's pumps and dynamos and repaired the auxiliary steering gear. No charts or navigational instruments had survived so the crew estimated a course from occasional glimpses of the sun. Her radio had not survived either. They managed to sail the tanker across the rest of the Atlantic, braving bad weather and U-boats. After seven days the San Demetrio reached waters off Ireland, from where they were escorted on to the mouth of the River Clyde, docking on 16 November 1940. They declined the offer of a tow from a tug because of the high cost.

Despite the damage and fire, only 200 tons of San Demetrio's highly volatile cargo had been lost. There was only one fatality, John Boyle, who had been injured jumping into the lifeboat after the original battle and gradually began to feel unwell. He was propped up in the engine room, to watch the gauges, but died of a haemorrhage after two days. He was posthumously awarded the King's Commendation for Brave Conduct.

Since the crew had received no assistance from another vessel, in the ensuing case in the Probate, Divorce and Admiralty Division of the High Court, they were able to claim the salvage money from the insurers for the ship and cargo. The oil and freight cargo were valued at £60,000. The ship herself, almost new, was worth £250,000. The High Court awarded the claimants £14,700 salvage money: £2,000 of it going to Second Officer Hawkins; £1,000 to the estate of John Boyle. Another £1,000 went to 26-year-old Oswald John Edmund Preston, a Canadian seaman and Naturalized American Citizen, because he played a "magnificent" part when the battle started. Hawkins was also given the tattered Red Ensign of the ship.

Salvage payouts

Name	Position	Award
Arthur Godfrey Hawkins	Second Officer	£2000
Charles Pollard	Chief Engineer	£2000
George P. Willey	Third Engineer	£1400
John L. Jones	Apprentice	£1200
W. E. Fletcher	Boatswain	£1200
John Boyle	Greaser	£1000
J. Davies	Storekeeper	£1000
Oswald Preston	Able Seaman	£1000
C. McNeil	Able Seaman	£1000
Roderick McLennan	Able Seaman	£800
John Halloran	Second Steward	£600
John Jamieson	Mess Room Steward	£600
John Porter	Assistant Steward	£300
Clifford Cottis	Ordinary Seaman	£300
Roy Housden	Cadet	£200
G. Mortimer	Able Seaman	£100

Second Officer Hawkins was awarded the OBE for his gallantry. Chief Engineer Charles Pollard and Deck Apprentice John Lewis Jones each received the Lloyd's War Medal for Bravery at Sea. San Demetrio was repaired and returned to service.

== Sinking ==
On 14 March 1942 San Demetrio sailed unescorted from Baltimore, Maryland bound for the UK via Halifax, Nova Scotia with a cargo of 4,000 tons of alcohol and 7,000 tons of aviation spirit. On 17 March she was northwest of Cape Charles, Virginia when the German submarine U-404, commanded by KptLt Otto von Bülow, torpedoed and sank her. 16 crew and three DEMS gunners were lost, and six crew wounded, but survivors managed to launch two lifeboats. Two days later the US tanker SS Beta rescued the Master, 26 crew and five DEMS gunners and took them to Norfolk, Virginia. The Master, Conrad Vidot, was awarded the Lloyd's War Medal.

== Film ==
The ship's part in Convoy HX 84 was made into a film, San Demetrio London in 1943, starring Walter Fitzgerald, Mervyn Johns, Ralph Michael, and Robert Beatty. It was one of the few films to recognise the heroism of British Merchant Navy crews during the war.

== Books ==
An 64-page account of the events surrounding the sinking written by F. Tennyson Jesse, The Saga of San Demetrio, was published by HMSO in 1942 as an exercise in helping boost public morale.

One of the ship's crew, Able Seaman Calum Macneil, wrote a memoir called San Demetrio, published by Angus and Robertson in 1957. It is a personal account of his leaving his previous ship and joining the San Demetrio, and of the subsequent attack and re-boarding.

== Art depictions and museum holdings ==
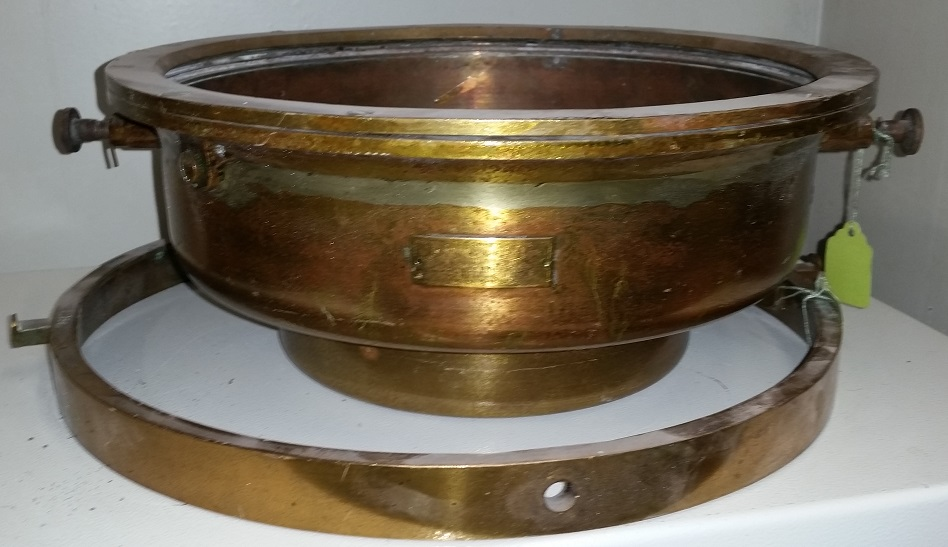
Compass from the San Demetrio, currently held at the Imperial War Museum, Duxford with reference number MAR1274

A wartime poster entitled "San Demetrio gets home" was issued by the Post Office Savings Bank. It featured a painting of the ship by Charles Pears. She is also depicted in two works by marine painter Norman Wilkinson. The 'San Demetrio' at the Jervis Bay action, 5 November 1940 is held by the National Maritime Museum (NMM), while The Crew Reboarding the Tanker 'San Demetrio', 7 November 1940 is held by the Imperial War Museum (IWM). The NMM collection also includes the ship's bell. The IWM collection includes the compass (pictured right), a fragment of her wheel, and two models of the ship. One of these models was made by Ealing Studios for use in the making of the film San Demetrio London. The compass along with two newspaper cuttings (pictured right) were stored in John Jamieson's father's tenement from 1940 until 1972 at 600 Paisley Road West, Glasgow, then in Southampton, before being donated to the Imperial War Museum.

== See also ==
- SS Ohio
