= Theodor Krancke =

German admiral

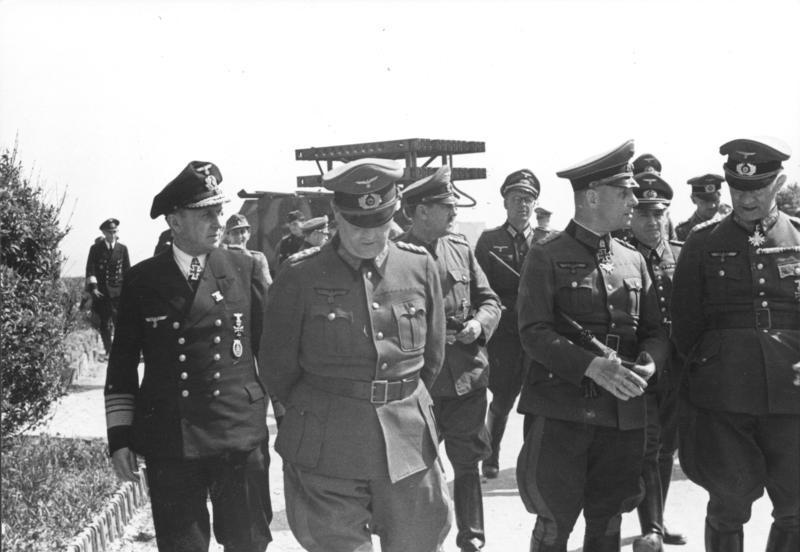
- Krancke (left) with General Walther Buhle and Field Marshal Erwin Rommel
- Born: 30 March 1893; Magdeburg, Germany
- Died: 18 June 1973 (aged 80); Wentorf bei Hamburg, West Germany
- Military career
- Allegiance: Germany
- Branch: Imperial German Navy; Reichsmarine; Kriegsmarine
- Service years: 1912–45
- Rank: Admiral
- Commands: Cruiser Admiral Scheer
- Conflicts: World War I World War II
- Awards: Knight's Cross of the Iron Cross with Oak Leaves

Theodor Krancke (30 March 1893 – 18 June 1973) was a naval commander and admiral of Germany during World War II and a recipient of the Knight's Cross of the Iron Cross with Oak Leaves.

Under the command of Krancke, during the five-month-long raiding cruise, the pocket battleship Admiral Scheer sank 13 merchant ships, one armed merchant cruiser HMS Jervis Bay, and captured three merchant ships representing 115,195 gross register tons (GRT) of Allied and neutral shipping.

During the Allied Invasion of Normandy Krancke, as Commander-in-Chief of Navy Group Command West headquartered in Paris, controlled all German naval vessels in France, as well as the various land-based naval units and the naval coastal artillery and anti-aircraft batteries along the French Atlantic coast.

== Dates of rank ==
- Fähnrich zur See – 12 April 1913
- Leutnant zur See – 22 March 1915
- Oberleutnant zur See – 25 December 1917
- Kapitänleutnant – 1 September 1922
- Korvettenkapitän – 1 October 1930
- Fregattenkapitän – 1 November 1935
- Kapitän zur See – 1 April 1937
- Konteradmiral – 1 April 1941
- Vizeadmiral – 1 April 1942
- Admiral – 1 March 1943

== Awards ==
- Iron Cross (1914) 2nd Class (May 1915) & 1st Class (27 September 1919)
- Sudetenland Medal 1939
- High Seas Fleet Badge 1941
- Clasp to the Iron Cross (1939) 2nd Class (29 October 1939) & 1st Class (20 April 1940)
- Knight's Cross of the Iron Cross with Oak Leaves
  - Knight's Cross on 21 February 1941 as Kapitän zur See and commander of heavy cruiser Admiral Scheer
  - 614th Oak Leaves on 18 October 1944 as Admiral and commander in chief of Marinegruppenkommando West (Navy Group Command West)

Military offices
| Preceded by Generaladmiral Wilhelm Marschall | Commander-in-Chief of the Kriegsmarine Group Command West; 20 April 1943 – 20 October 1944 | Succeeded by Kriegsmarine High Command West |
| Preceded by Kriegsmarine Group Command West | Commander-in-Chief of Kriegsmarine High Command West; 20 October 1944 – 18 April 1945 | Succeeded by none |
| Preceded by Admiral Otto Ciliax | Commander-in-Chief of the Kriegsmarine High Command Norway; 26 April 1945 – 26 August 1945 | Succeeded by none |
