= HMS Jervis Bay =

20th-century British armed merchant ship

Coordinates: 53°41′N 32°17′W

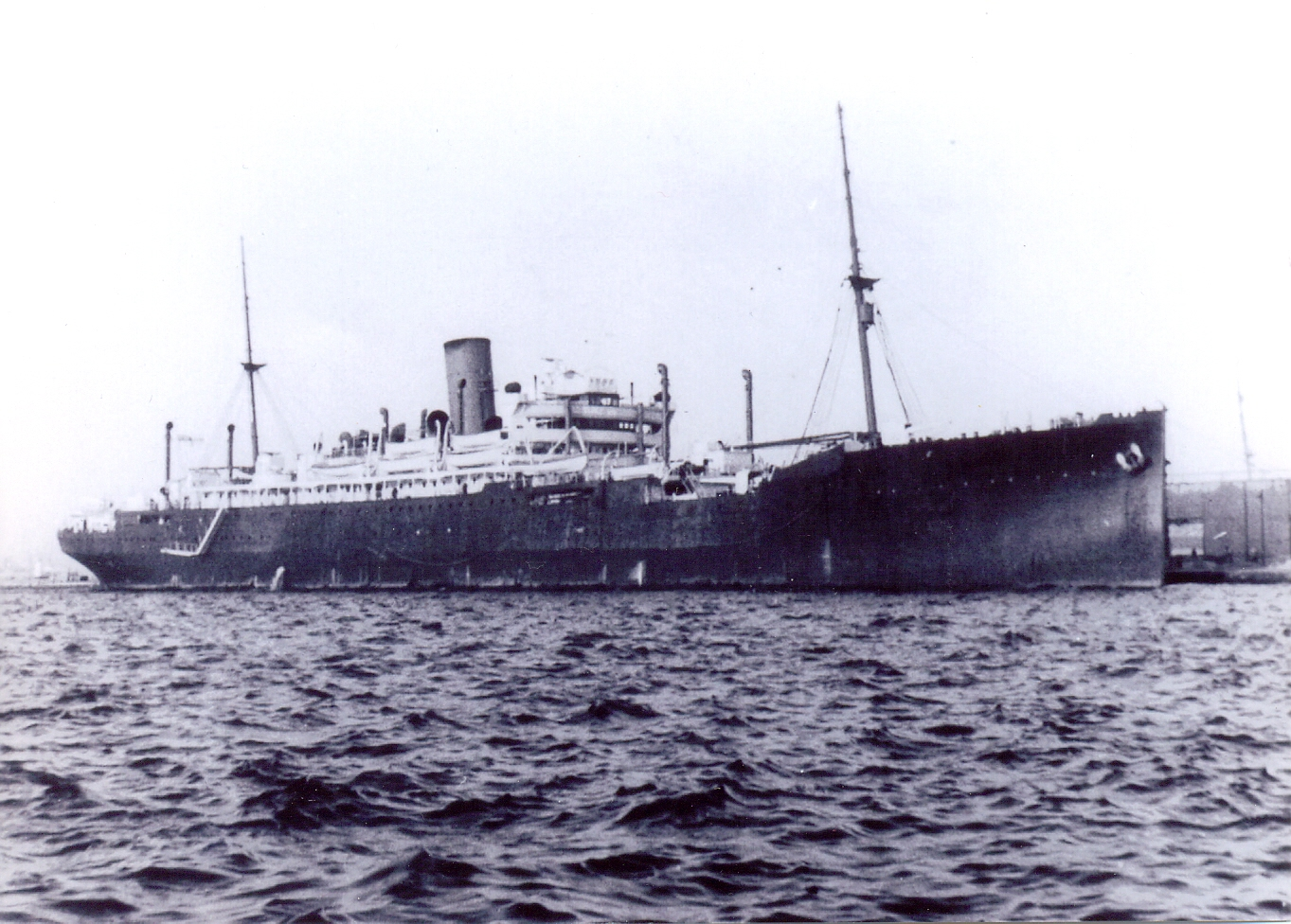
- Jervis Bay at Dakar in 1940

History

United Kingdom
- Name: Jervis Bay
- Builder: Vickers Shipbuilding & Engineering, Barrow-in-Furness
- Launched: 17 January 1922
- Acquired: August 1939
- Commissioned: October 1940
- Fate: Sunk by the cruiser Admiral Scheer, 5 November 1940

General characteristics
- Type: Armed Merchant Cruiser
- Tonnage: 14,164 grt
- Length: 549 ft (167 m)
- Beam: 68 ft (21 m)
- Draught: 33 ft (10 m)
- Speed: 15 knots (28 km/h; 17 mph)
- Complement: 254
- Armament: 7 × 6 in (152 mm) Mk. VII guns; 2 × 3 in (76 mm) AA guns

HMS Jervis Bay was a British liner later converted into an armed merchant cruiser, pennant F40. She was launched in 1922, and sunk in battle on 5 November 1940 by the German heavy cruiser Admiral Scheer in an action which earned her captain the Victoria Cross.

== Merchant service ==
The ship was launched as the Commonwealth Line, Australian steamer Jervis Bay, named after the Australian bay of that name (the line named all its passenger liners after bays). She was one of five large liners that operated in the immigrant trade between the United Kingdom and Australia.

The Commonwealth Line had problems with high operating costs and frequent industrial action, so in 1928 its ships were sold to the White Star Line who operated them in the Aberdeen and Commonwealth Line – an entity created by merging into the Aberdeen Line, which was a White Star subsidiary. In new ownership, TSS Jervis Bay used Southampton as her UK port instead of London, as had been the case under Commonwealth Line management. In 1931, she was converted to a one-class ship. The accommodation was altered from 12 first class and about 712 third class passengers to a tourist class ship carrying 270 passengers. This could be increased by the addition of temporary cabins to a total of 540.

== Naval service ==
Jervis Bay was requisitioned by the Royal Navy in August 1939 at the outbreak of the World War II, and armed with seven 1898-vintage BL 6-in (152 mm) guns and two QF 3-inch (76.2 mm) guns of 1894 design. The 6-inch guns were in single centre-pivot mountings with open-backed shields, to protect against blast and splinters at best, being arranged as follows: Two on either side of the forecastle and two either side of the upper deck behind the break of the forecastle, giving two guns firing dead ahead; two guns were mounted on the quarterdeck and the seventh was on the aft deckhouse roof with full command of the stern, giving the ship three guns able to fire dead astern, or a total of four 6-inch guns available on broadside. The 3-inch AA guns were mounted on either side of the boat deck, just aft of amidships, in unusual circular open-topped casements, giving each weapon a 180-degree arc of fire to the side; they would be capable of contributing to broadside fire in an emergency.

After her acquisition and commissioning, Jervis Bay was initially placed under the Commander-in-Chief, South Atlantic. She was involved in an incident on 13 October 1939 while at Rosyth, ramming the old S-class destroyer HMS Sabre (H18). Sabre was under repair for over six months. Jervis Bay then became a convoy escort in May 1940, based at the Royal Naval Dockyard, Bermuda. Given brief repairs at Halifax, Nova Scotia, she became the sole escort for the 37 merchant ships of Convoy HX 84 from Bermuda and Halifax to Britain (Jervis Bay escorted a convoy from Bermuda which merged at sea with a convoy from Halifax, since larger convoys suffered fewer losses than smaller ones due to the relatively smaller defensive perimeter of the larger surface area).

When the convoy encountered the German warship Admiral Scheer about 755 nautical miles (1,398 km) south-southwest of Reykjavík, the captain of Jervis Bay, Edward Fegen, ordered the convoy to scatter, and set his own ship on a course towards the German warship to draw its fire. Jervis Bay was hopelessly outgunned and outranged by the 28 cm (11inch) guns of the German ship, but it attacked the larger ship with its guns, firing more to distract the German ship from the merchantmen than with hopes of doing any damage. Although the German's shells ravaged Jervis Bay, and Fegen was wounded and many crewmen killed, Fegen and the surviving crew fought on until their ship was sunk. Captain Fegen and many of the crew went down with the ship.

Jervis Bay's sacrifice bought enough time for the convoy to begin to scatter. According to some sources, further time was bought by the freighter SS Beaverford, which reportedly engaged Admiral Scheer for over four hours. However, the account published after the war by the captain of Admiral Scheer and the timings of the sinking show that there was no such engagement. Beaverford fled with the other ships, but was sunk during the night. In the end, the German cruiser was only able to sink five merchant ships, and the remainder of the convoy escaped.

Sixty-eight survivors of Jervis Bay's crew of 254 were picked up by the neutral Swedish ship Stureholm (three later died of their wounds). Guy Byam was one of the survivors of the sinking; he was later killed while covering an air raid over Germany for the BBC.

Captain Fegen was awarded a posthumous Victoria Cross as a result of this action. The citation for his award reads:

For valour in challenging hopeless odds and giving his life to save the many ships it was his duty to protect. On the 5th of November, 1940, in heavy seas, Captain Fegen, in His Majesty's Armed Merchant Cruiser Jervis Bay, was escorting thirty-eight Merchantmen. Sighting a powerful German warship he at once drew clear of the Convoy, made straight for the Enemy, and brought his ship between the Raider and her prey, so that they might scatter and escape. Crippled, in flames, unable to reply, for nearly an hour the Jervis Bay held the German's fire. So she went down: but of the Merchantmen all but four or five were saved.

== Memorials ==
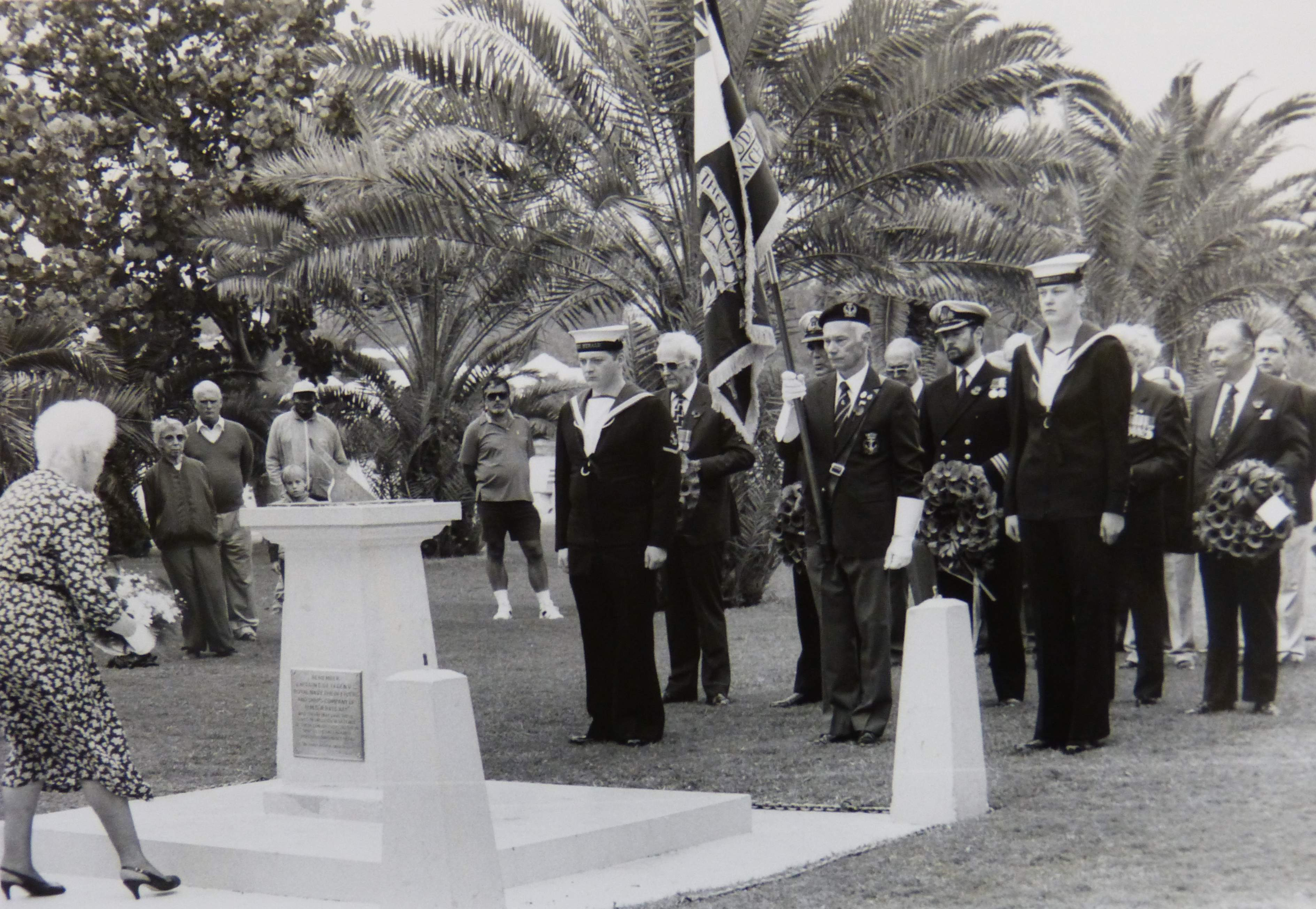
Remembrance Day ceremony at HMS Jervis Bay memorial at Hamilton, Bermuda

=== Bermuda ===
There is a monument to Jervis Bay at Albouy's Point, in Hamilton, Bermuda, from where Jervis Bay had departed on her final mission. Bermuda was a formation point for trans-Atlantic convoys in both world wars. During the Second World War, convoys formed at Bermuda and coded BHX merged at sea with those formed at Halifax, which were coded HX, before crossing the Atlantic Ocean as it was easier to protect one large convoy than two smaller.

The monument was unveiled on 5 November 1941, in front of a Guard of Honour provided by the Royal Marines detachment of Despatch, by Vice Admiral Charles Kennedy-Purvis, Commander-in-Chief of the America and West Indies Station, who said:

To-day is the anniversary of a very gallant naval deed, that of the action of H.M.S. Jervis Bay, in which the ship was lost with most hands, carrying out her duty on November 5th, 1940.... The Jervis Bay was serving at the time under my command on this station and she was well-known in this City, where her officers and ship's company had many friends....The Jervis Bay was a medium-sized liner of 16 knots, used on the Australian trade. She was taken up at the beginning of the war and armed with eight 6-inch guns, of which four could be fired on one broadside. She was manned by a crew mostly Royal Naval Reserve and Mercantile Marine. The only Royal Naval Officer was Captain Fegen, her Commander - that was all. On November 5th towards evening she was steaming in the centre of the front line of a big convoy of nearly forty ships. These ships were disposed in columns of four with the columns abeam of each other. Suddenly, the port wing ship sighted smoke on the port bow, and very soon afterwards the foretop of a man-of-war.... Captain Fegen instructed the Commandant of the convoy, if this proved to be an enemy ship, to turn his convoy to starboard and to scatter, while he went out to port to engage the enemy. It soon became plain that the ship was German - one of the pocket battleships. The Jervis Bay steamed out ahead and turned to port. The convoy turned to starboard, dropping smoke floats and soon after scattered. The Jervis Bay proceeded on her course and was soon enveloped in the fire of six 11-inch guns. She was heavily straddled and hit and took fire. As soon as he was within range with his own guns, Captain Fegen opened fire and kept his 6-inch guns firing until the last. The ship became a blazing wreck and after an hour's action went to the bottom. A few survivors were picked up that night. The Jervis Bay delayed an attack on the convoy for a while and in that time the convoy was all over the ocean, with the result that only some 20% of the ships were lost and 80% of the convoy reached home. Now, that is a tremendous decision to take when you are faced with overwhelming odds, but I know that in Captain Fegen's case there were no second thoughts. He had been brought up by his training of nearly forty years in His Majesty's Navy and by tradition to believe that the duty of an escort of a convoy is to protect that convoy at all costs. This he did. He was posthumously awarded the Victoria Cross, the highest award for bravery which His Majesty the King can award.

A small ceremony is held before the monument every Remembrance Day (following the larger parade in front of the Cenotaph commemorating all of the territory's dead of the two world wars) in which personnel from the Royal Navy, the Royal Naval Association, and the Sea Cadet Corps take part.

=== Canada ===
There is a monument to Captain Fegen and the crew of Jervis Bay at Ross Memorial Park in Saint John, New Brunswick, Canada. This is the port where she was refitted for war service in the summer of 1940.

In early 1941, the city of Owen Sound, Ontario dedicated the HMS Jervis Bay Park as a permanent memorial to the ship and to Stoker A.M. "Jimmy" Johnson, RCNR, a resident of the city who was a casualty of the sinking of Jervis Bay.

In the Lakeside Heights Area of the City of Pointe-Claire in Quebec, built for the WWII veterans and where the streets are named upon war locations, events, etc., there is a Jervis Bay Avenue.

=== Britain ===
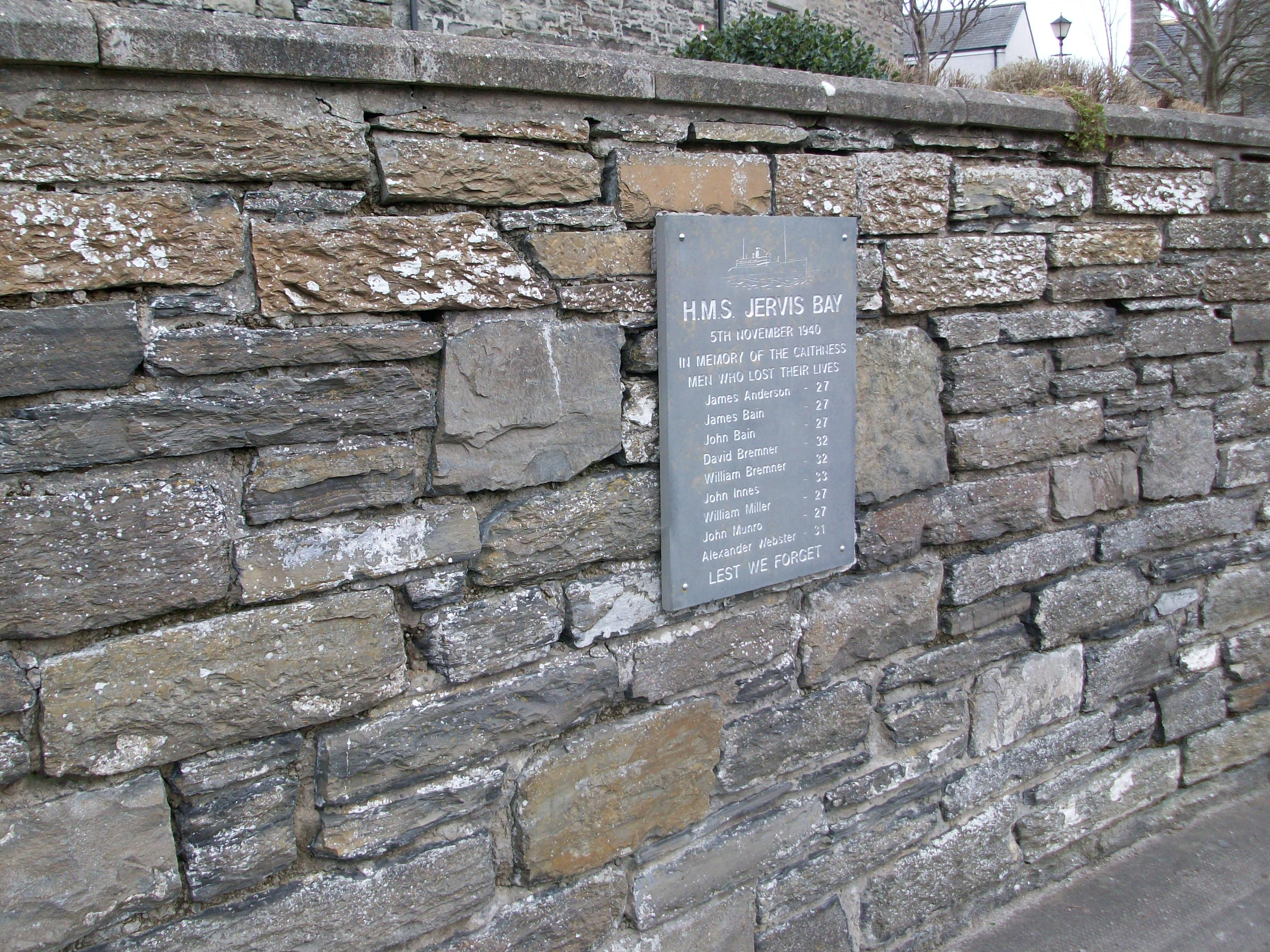
Plaque to the Caithness crew of HMS Jervis Bay, at Wick

In 2006 the Scottish town of Wick erected a plaque to the Caithness members who died in the sinking of the ship. The ship was crewed extensively from Caithness, and Wick in particular.

There was also a monument in London. The main room of the Merchant Navy Hotel (closed, 2002) was known as the "Jervis Bay Room", and included a display detailing the action. It was the custom for everyone entering the room to salute the display.

=== Depictions ===
The Australian poet Michael Thwaites wrote a ballad about Jervis Bay in 1941, while he was serving as a naval officer in the Atlantic. It can be read in The Faber Book of War Poetry or online at the Thwaites family website.

The final action of Jervis Bay was portrayed in the movie San Demetrio London, released in 1943, regarding the tale of heavy damage and subsequent survival of MV San Demetrio, one of the vessels of Convoy HX 84. The encounter between Jervis Bay and Admiral Scheer is also narrated in a short story in Alistair MacLean's book The Lonely Sea. Jervis Bay is also commemorated by the Jervis Bay Memorial Pipe Band, located in Saint John, New Brunswick, Canada.

The ship is featured as a model in Scarborough's "Naval Warfare" holiday show, which takes place in the summer at Peasholm Park; in the show the ship fights off an enemy battleship and submarine.

In the Ant and Cleo novels by Dominic Green, a British space fleet names one of its cruisers in the Jervis Bay's honour.

It is also the subject of issue 47 of Hitman and in Volume 6 of the collection, which the protagonists take as an example of how to live.

The ship was later honoured by the Sea Cadets and Marine Cadets Detachment in Brock Barracks in Reading, who adopted TS Jervis Bay (Training Ship) as the name of the unit.

Two ships of the Royal Australian Navy have been named HMAS Jervis Bay, however, for Jervis Bay, on the south coast of New South Wales.

== In popular culture ==
The ship and its sinking is depicted in an early part of the 1943 film San Demetrio London.

A merchant ship, Jervis Bay, is in the Tony Palmer 1969 documentary on Jack Bruce; Rope Ladder To The Moon at 11m 23s; the ship Jervis Bay figures prominently as the camera pans right.

== Sources ==
- Osborne, Richard; Spong, Harry & Grover, Tom (2007). Armed Merchant Cruisers 1878–1945. Windsor, UK: World Warship Society. ISBN 978-0-9543310-8-5.
- Ralph Segman and Gerald Duskin, If the Gods are Good: The Epic Sacrifice of HMS Jervis Bay (Naval Institute Press, 2004)
