= List of shipwrecks in November 1940 =

The list of shipwrecks in November 1940 includes ships sunk, foundered, grounded, or otherwise lost during November 1940.

== 1 November ==
List of shipwrecks: 1 November 1940
Ship	State	Description
East Oaze Lightship	Trinity House	World War II: The lightship was bombed and sunk in the Thames Estuary by Luftwaffe aircraft. All seven crew were killed.
Elsi	Estonia	The 246 GRT motor schooner on a passage from Wismar for Tallinn in ballast, ran aground and was wrecked at Kåseberga.
Empire Bison	United Kingdom	World War II: Convoy HX 82: The Design 1019 cargo ship (5,612 GRT) on a voyage from Baltimore for Clyde with a cargo of scrap steel and 94 trucks, straggled behind the convoy. She was torpedoed and sunk in the Atlantic Ocean (59°30′N 17°40′W) by U-124 (Kriegsmarine) with the loss of 38 lives (30 crew, 1 gunner and 7 passengers). There were only four survivors.
Hans	Denmark	World War II: The coaster (39 GRT) vanished without a trace during a storm in the Kattegat with the loss of her two crew.
Hundvaag	Norway	World War II: The coaster (690 GRT) on a passage from Immingham for Dover with a cargo of coal, struck a mine and sank in the English Channel off Dover, Kent (51°08′41″N 1°27′55″E) with the loss of a crew member from the fifteen people aboard.
Letchworth	United Kingdom	World War II: Convoy FS 22: The collier (1,317 GRT) on a trip from Blyth for London with a cargo of coal, was bombed and sunk in the Thames Estuary north east of Sheerness, Kent by Junkers Ju 87 bombers of StG 1 with the loss of a crew member.
Placidas Faroult	Royal Navy	World War II: The lighter (136 GRT) was run aground by a storm on Blackstone rock, Salcombe, England and was wrecked. There were no casualties.
Poul Børge	Denmark	World War II: The fishing trawler (26 GRT) was pushed aground by a storm near Lyngvig, Denmark, and was wrecked. All hands survived.
Santa Lucia	Netherlands	World War II: Convoy HG 45: The coaster (379 GRT) on her way in from Oporto, struck a mine and sank in Belfast Lough 3.6 nautical miles (6.7 km) off Pile Light. Two of her eight crew were lost and two others, including the captain, died of wounds.
HMT Tilbury Ness	Royal Navy	World War II: The Castle-class minesweeping naval trawler (279 GRT) was bombed and sunk in the Thames Estuary by Ju 87 bombers of StG 1 with the loss of ten crew. Ten survivors were rescued by HMS Royal Eagle (Royal Navy) and Salvo (United Kingdom).
HMT Torbay II	Royal Navy	World War II: The drifter (83 GRT), used as a patrol vessel, was bombed and sunk in The Downs by Ju 87 bombers of StG 1. A crew member was killed.

== 2 November ==
List of shipwrecks: 2 November 1940
Ship	State	Description
Deanbrook	United Kingdom	World War II: The tug (149 GRT) was sunk by the explosion of a magnetic mine while being moored in Tilbury Dock Basin, Essex with the loss of all four hands. She was later raised and scrapped.
Goodwill	Royal Navy	World War II: The drifter (28 GRT) struck a mine and sank in the Firth of Forth 3.1 miles to the north-east of Inchkeith. There were no casualties.
Lea	United Kingdom	World War II: The tug (168 GRT) was sunk by the explosion of a magnetic mine while being moored in Tilbury Dock Basin, Essex with the loss of all six hands. She was later raised and scrapped.
Penola	United Kingdom	The schooner (166 GRT) was damaged in a collision in Firth of Clyde and was run aground near Toward Point, Argyllshire. The crew took to the lifeboat and made their way safely to the shore. She was a total loss.
HMT Rinovia	Royal Navy	World War II: The naval trawler (429 GRT) struck a mine and sank in the English Channel off Falmouth, Cornwall with the loss of fourteen of her crew. There were 4 survivors.
U-31	Kriegsmarine	World War II: The Type VIIA submarine (915 GRT) was depth charged and sunk in the Atlantic Ocean north west of Ireland (56°26′N 10°18′W) by HMS Antelope (Royal Navy) with the loss of two crew. The 44 survivors were taken as prisoners of war.

== 3 November ==
List of shipwrecks: 3 November 1940
Ship	State	Description
Casanare	United Kingdom	World War II: The cargo ship (5,376 GRT) on a trip from Victoria for Garston with a cargo of bananas, was torpedoed and sunk in the Atlantic Ocean 200 nautical miles (370 km) west of County Donegal, Ireland (53°58′N 14°13′W) by U-99 (Kriegsmarine) with the loss of nine of crew. The 54 survivors were rescued by HMS Beagle (Royal Navy).
Kildale	United Kingdom	World War II: Convoy WN 20: The cargo ship (3,877 GRT) on a trip from Barahona for London with a cargo of sugar, was bombed and sunk in the North Sea north east of Fraserburgh, Aberdeenshire (57°45′N 1°45′W) by Heinkel He 115 aircraft of 706 Küstenfliegergruppe, Luftwaffe with the loss of two of her 37 crew.
HMS Laurentic	Royal Navy	World War II: The 18,724 GRT armed merchant cruiser was torpedoed and sunk in the Atlantic Ocean west of Bloody Foreland, County Donegal, Ireland (54°09′N 13°44′W) by U-99 (Kriegsmarine) with the loss of 49 of the 417 people on board. Survivors were rescued by HMS Beagle (Royal Navy).
Sigrun	Denmark	World War II: The 1,337 GRT cargo ship on a passage from Oslo for Porsgrunn in ballast, was torpedoed and sunk in Oslofjord 10 nautical miles (19 km) east south east of Larvik, Norway (58°59′N 10°21′E) by HMS Sturgeon (Royal Navy). Twenty of her crew were killed.
Van der Weyden	Belgium	World War II: The fishing trawler struck a mine and sank at Milford Haven, Pembrokeshire, United Kingdom. Eight of her crew were killed.

== 4 November ==
List of shipwrecks: 4 November 1940
Ship	State	Description
HMS Patroclus	Royal Navy	World War II: The 11,314 GRT armed merchant cruiser was torpedoed and sunk in the Atlantic Ocean west of Bloody Foreland, County Donegal, Ireland (53°43′N 14°41′W) by U-99 (Kriegsmarine) with the loss of 56 of her 319 crew. Survivors, plus those from Casanare (United Kingdom) and HMS Laurentic (Royal Navy), were rescued by HMS Achates and HMS Hesperus (both Royal Navy).
Snia Amba	Italy	World War II: The 2,532 GRT cargo ship travelling in a convoy from Tripoli to Tobruk, was torpedoed and damaged off Benghasi, Libya (31°35′N 19°20′E) by HMS Tetrarch (Royal Navy). She was towed to Benghasi, where she remained in unusable state until scuttled in February 1941 prior to city's evacuation.

== 5 November ==
List of shipwrecks: 5 November 1940
Ship	State	Description
Beaverford	United Kingdom	World War II: Convoy HX 84: The 10,042 GRT cargo ship on a trip from Montreal for Liverpool with a cargo of copper, aluminum, munitions and foodstuffs, was shelled, torpedoed and sunk in the Atlantic Ocean (52°26′N 32°34′W) by Admiral Scheer (Kriegsmarine) with the loss of all 77 crew.
Fresno City	United Kingdom	World War II: Convoy HX 84: The 4,955 GRT cargo ship on a voyage from Montreal for Oban with a cargo of maize, was shelled and sunk in the Atlantic Ocean (51°47′N 33°29′W) by Admiral Scheer (Kriegsmarine) with the loss of one of her 37 crew. Survivors were rescued by Gloucester City (United Kingdom) and Mount Taygetus (Greece).
Gartbrattan	United Kingdom	World War II: Convoy OG 45: The 1,811 GRT cargo ship on a trip from Cardiff for Lisbon with a cargo of coal, collided with Melrose Abbey(United Kingdom) and sank in the Atlantic Ocean west of Cape Clear Island, County Cork, Ireland (51°03′N 19°35′W).
Haig Rose	United Kingdom	The 1,117 GRT cargo ship departed from Barry, Glamorgan for Plymouth, Devon with a cargo of coal. No further trace, presumed foundered or mined in the Bristol Channel with the loss of all thirteen crew.
HMS Jervis Bay	Royal Navy	World War II: Convoy HX 84: The armed merchant cruiser was shelled and sunk in the Atlantic Ocean 735 nautical miles (1,361 km) south west of Iceland (52°50′N 32°15′W) by Admiral Scheer with the loss of 136 of her 201 crew. Survivors were rescued by Stureholm (Sweden).
Kenbane Head	United Kingdom	World War II: Convoy HX 84: The 5,225 GRT cargo ship on a trip from Montreal for Belfast with general cargo, was shelled and sunk in the Atlantic Ocean west of Ireland (52°26′N 32°34′W) by Admiral Scheer (Kriegsmarine) with the loss of 23 of her 47 crew. Survivors were rescued by Gloucester City (United Kingdom).
Lady Drusie	United Kingdom	World War II: The vessel struck a mine and sank off Milford Haven, Pembrokeshire. A crew member was killed.
Maidan	United Kingdom	World War II: Convoy HX 84: The 7,908 GRT cargo ship on a trip from Halifax for Liverpool with a cargo of ammunition, was shelled by Admiral Scheer (Kriegsmarine), exploded and sank in the Atlantic Ocean west of Ireland (52°28′N 32°08′W) with the loss of all 91 crew.
Mopan	United Kingdom	World War II: The 5,389 GRT banana boat on a voyage from Port Antonio for Garston with a cargo of bananas, was shelled and sunk in the Atlantic Ocean west of Ireland (52°59′N 32°12′W) by Admiral Scheer (Kriegsmarine). All 68 crew survived but were taken as prisoners of war.
San Demetrio	United Kingdom	World War II: Convoy HX 84: The tanker was shelled and set on fire in the Atlantic Ocean (52°48′N 32°15′W) by Admiral Scheer (Kriegsmarine) and was abandoned by her crew. All 41 crew initially survived the attack. Twenty-five survivors were rescued by Gloucester City (United Kingdom). The other sixteen reboarded the burning ship on 7 November and she reached the Clyde on 16 November, one of the crew dying en route from injuries sustained. She was subsequently repaired and returned to service.
Scottish Maiden	United Kingdom	World War II: Convoy HX 83: The 6,993 GRT tanker on a trip from Curaçao for Avonmouth with a cargo of fuel oil, was torpedoed and sunk in the Atlantic Ocean 225 nautical miles (417 km) west by south of Bloody Foreland, County Donegal, Ireland (54°36′N 14°23′W) by U-99 (Kriegsmarine) with the loss of sixteen of her 43 crew. Survivors were rescued by HMS Beagle (Royal Navy).
Trewellard	United Kingdom	World War II: Convoy HX 84: The 5,201 GRT cargo ship on a voyage from Boston for Liverpool with a cargo of steel and 12 airplanes, was shelled and sunk in the Atlantic Ocean (52°27′N 32°09′W) by Admiral Scheer (Kriegsmarine) with the loss of sixteen of her 41 crew. Survivors were rescued by Gloucester City (United Kingdom).

== 6 November ==
List of shipwrecks: 6 November 1940
Ship	State	Description
Clan MacKinlay	United Kingdom	World War II: Convoy WN 31: The 6,365 GRT cargo ship on a trip from Bombay for London with a cargo of crepe rubber, was bombed and sunk in the North Sea off Noss Head, Caithness (58°33′N 2°53′W) by Heinkel He 115 aircraft of 706 Küstenfliegergruppe, Luftwaffe with the loss of five of her 82 crew.
Delfinus	Norway	World War II: The 1,294 GRT cargo ship on a passage for Hamburg with a cargo of fish, was torpedoed and sunk in the North Sea west of Varhaug (58°34′N 5°37′E) by HMS Sturgeon (Royal Navy). Her crew survived.
Comandante Faà di Bruno	Regia Marina	World War II: The Marcello-class submarine was depth charged and sunk in the Atlantic Ocean south west of Ireland by HMS Harvester (Royal Navy) and HMCS Ottawa (Royal Canadian Navy). All 55 crew were killed.
Elly	Sweden	World War II: The fishing vessel struck a mine and sank in the Skagerrak 20 nautical miles (37 km) west of the Pater Noster Lighthouse with the loss of five of her crew.
HMT Girl Helen	Royal Navy	World War II: The 63 GRT naval drifter struck a mine and sank in the North Sea off Newcastle upon Tyne, Northumberland.
Nalon	United Kingdom	World War II: Convoy SLF-52: The 7,222 GRT cargo liner on a passage from Beira for Clyde via Cape Town with a cargo of copper, was bombed and sunk in the Atlantic Ocean west of Ireland (53°57′N 15°03′W) by Focke-Wulf Fw 200 aircraft of I Staffeln, Kampfgeschwader 40, Luftwaffe. Her 72 crew were rescued.
HMS Sevra	Royal Navy	World War II: The 253 GRT naval whaler struck a mine and sank in the English Channel off Falmouth, Cornwall.

== 7 November ==
List of shipwrecks: 7 November 1940
Ship	State	Description
Astrologer	United Kingdom	World War II: Convoy FS 328: The 1,673 GRT cargo ship on a passage from Leith for London, was bombed and damaged in the Thames Estuary off the coast of Essex (51°32′N 1°06′E) by Heinkel He 115 aircraft of Küstenfliegergrüppe 506, Luftwaffe and was beached. She was wrecked in a gale on 15 November.
Cambridge	United Kingdom	World War II: The refrigerated cargo ship struck a mine in the Bass Strait and sank with the loss of one of her 56 crew. Survivors were rescued by HMAS Orara (Royal Australian Navy). Cambridge was on a voyage from Cardiff, Glamorgan to Brisbane, Queensland, Australia.
Herland	United Kingdom	World War II: The Design 1099 cargo ship (2,645 GRT) struck a mine and sank in the Thames Estuary north east of Sheerness, Kent (51°29′10″N 0°53′35″E) with the loss of eighteen of her 37 crew.
Poncelet	(France) Vichy French Navy	World War II: Battle of Gabon: The submarine was damaged in the Atlantic Ocean off Gabon, French Equatorial Africa by HMS Milford (Royal Navy) and a Supermarine Walrus aircraft of the Fleet Air Arm based on HMS Devonshire (Royal Navy). She was scuttled at 0°20′S 8°50′E by her captain, who sank with her. The rest of her crew were rescued by HMS Foxhound and HMS Fortune (both Royal Navy).
Poulmic	Free French Naval Forces	World War II: The 300 GRT auxiliary minesweeper struck a mine and sank in the English Channel off Plymouth, Devon (50°19.193′N 004°09.696′W) with the loss of eleven of her eighteen crew.
HMT Reed	Royal Navy	World War II: The 99 GRT naval trawler struck a mine and sank in the North Sea south of Clacton-on-Sea, Essex (51°46′00″N 1°14′05″E) with the loss of all sixteen crew.
HMS Swordfish	Royal Navy	World War II: The S-class submarine struck a mine and sank in the English Channel south of St. Catherine's Point, Isle of Wight with the loss of all 40 crew.
T6	Kriegsmarine	World War II: The Type 1935-class torpedo boat struck a mine and sank in the North Sea off Kinnaird Head, Aberdeenshire United Kingdom. Forty-four of her crew were killed. Survivors were rescued by T7 and T8 (both Kriegsmarine).
Victoria Regina	United Kingdom	The 146 GRT coaster on a trip from Maryport for Stranraer with Royal Air Force equipment, struck rocks on Sanda Island and was wrecked. Crew taken off.
HMT William Wesney	Royal Navy	World War II: The 364 GRT naval trawler struck a mine and sank in the North Sea east of Felixstowe, Suffolk (51°53′48″N 1°33′36″E) with the loss of five of her crew. Survivors were rescued by HMS Sheldrake (Royal Navy) and two British fishing trawlers.

== 8 November ==
List of shipwrecks: 8 November 1940
Ship	State	Description
Agamemnon	Netherlands	World War II: Convoy FN 329: The cargo ship was bombed and sunk in the Thames Estuary off the South West Swin Lightship ( Trinity House) (51°43′09″N 1°24′09″E) by Luftwaffe aircraft with the loss of two of her 29 crew. The wreck was subsequently dispersed by explosives.
HMS A.N. 2	Royal Navy	World War II: The 221 GRT converted whaler struck a mine and sank in the English Channel off Falmouth, Cornwall.
City of Rayville	United States	World War II: The cargo ship struck a mine and sank in the Bass Strait off Cape Otway, Victoria, Australia (38°51′S 143°39′E) with the loss of one of her 38 crew.
Dioni	Greece	The 4,227 GRT cargo ship on a passage from Dublin for Barry in ballast, was driven ashore near Milford Haven, Pembrokeshire, United Kingdom. She was refloated but was consequently scrapped.
Empire Dorado	United Kingdom	World War II: The Design 1016 ship was bombed and damaged in the Atlantic Ocean west of Ireland (55°07′N 16°50′W) by Luftwaffe aircraft. She was towed in to the Clyde. Subsequently repaired and returned to service.
Fireglow	United Kingdom	World War II: The 1,261 GRT cargo ship on a passage from London for Sunderland in ballast, was bombed and damaged in the North Sea off Turk Head by Heinkel He 115 aircraft of Küstenfliegergruppe 506, Luftwaffe. She was towed to Southend, repaired and returned to service.
HNoMS Fridtjof Nansen	Royal Norwegian Navy	The offshore patrol vessel ran aground and sank on Jan Mayen Island.
HMS Muria	Royal Navy	World War II: The 192 GRT rescue tug struck a mine and sank in the North Sea north of Margate, Kent (51°26′30″N 1°27′00″E) with the loss of all hands.
HNLMS O 22	Royal Netherlands Navy	World War II: The O 21-class submarine was depth charged and sunk off Lindesnes, Norway by UJ-117 and UJ-1104 (both Kriegsmarine) with the loss of all hands.
Vingaland	Sweden	World War II: Convoy HX 84: The cargo ship was bombed and set on fire in the Atlantic Ocean west of County Donegal, Ireland (55°41′N 18°24′W) by Focke-Wulf Fw 200 aircraft of I Staffeln, Kampfgeschwader 40, Luftwaffe with the loss of six of her 25 crew. Survivors were rescued by Danae II (United Kingdom). Vingaland was torpedoed and sunk the next day by Guglielmo Marconi (Regia Marina).

== 9 November ==
List of shipwrecks: 9 November 1940
Ship	State	Description
Baltrader	United Kingdom	World War II: The 1,699 GRT cargo ship on a trip from Seville for Clyde with general cargo, struck a mine, broke in two and sank in the North Sea 9 nautical miles (17 km) southeast of Clacton-on-Sea (51°41′N 1°18′E) with the loss of two crew.
Bougainville	(France) Vichy French Navy	World War II: Battle of Gabon: The Bougainville-class aviso was sunk in the Atlantic Ocean off Gabon, French Equatorial Africa by Commandant Dominé and Savorgnan de Brazza (both Free French Naval Forces).
V-104 Giuseppe e Maria	Regia Marina	The requisitioned 93 GRT trabaccolo was rammed and sunk in error 5 nautical miles (9.3 km) south of Capo Passero, Sicily by Santorre Santarosa.
Minerva	Finland	World War II: The 2,039 GRT cargo ship struck a mine and sank in the North Sea off Borkum, Germany.
Ridley	United Kingdom	The 4,993 GRT cargo ship on a passage from Glasgow for Pepel in ballast, caught fire and sank in the Atlantic Ocean (20°08′N 29°36′W). Her crew survived.

== 10 November ==
List of shipwrecks: 10 November 1940
Ship	State	Description
Garland	Newfoundland	The 15-ton Bell Island Strait ferry was run down and sunk in a snowstorm at Conception Bay by another ferry, Golden Dawn, killing 22 passengers and crew.
HMT Kingston Alalite	Royal Navy	World War II: The 412 GRT naval trawler struck a mine and sank in the English Channel off Plymouth, Devon with the loss of six of her crew.
HMT Marcelle	Royal Navy	World War II: The 64 GRT boom defence vessel struck a mine and sank in the Bristol Channel (51°21′48″N 3°08′00″W) with the loss of one of her five crew.
Vivi	Greece	World War II: The 489 GRT coaster on a trip from Piraeus for Katakolo with a cargo of wheat, wandered into Greek defensive minefield, struck a mine and sank in the Gulf of Patras off Cape Papas with a loss of 10 of her crew.

== 11 November ==
List of shipwrecks: 11 November 1940
Ship	State	Description
Anna C. Minch	Canada	Armistice Day Blizzard : The 4,139 GRT bulker on a trip from Fort William, Ontario for Chicago with a cargo of wheat screenings, ran into a violent gale, broke in two and sank in Lake Michigan off Pentwater with the loss of all 24 crew.
Ardmore	Ireland	The 1,023 GRT cargo ship on a trip from Cork for Fishguard with a cargo of livestock on board, struck a drifting mine in the Atlantic Ocean 3 nautical miles (5.6 km) south of Great Saltee Island, County Wexford, Ireland and sank with the loss of all 24 crew.
Automedon	United Kingdom	World War II: The cargo liner was captured in the Bay of Bengal off Sumatra, Netherlands East Indies (4°18′N 89°20′E) by Atlantis (Kriegsmarine) with the loss of eight of her 105 crew. She was subsequently scuttled.
Balmore	United Kingdom	World War II: Convoy HG 46: The 1,925 GRT cargo ship on a voyage from Huelva for Glasgow with a cargo of pyrites and cork, was bombed and sunk in the Atlantic Ocean 300 nautical miles (560 km) west of Ireland (52°00′N 17°00′W) by Focke-Wulf Fw 200 aircraft of I Staffeln, Kampfgeschwader 40, Luftwaffe. All 27 crew were killed.
Conte di Cavour	Regia Marina	World War II: Battle of Taranto: The Conte di Cavour-class battleship was torpedoed and sunk off Taranto by Fairey Swordfish aircraft based on HMS Illustrious (Royal Navy).
Creemuir	United Kingdom	World War II: Convoy EN 23: The 3,997 GRT cargo ship on a passage from Hull for Sydney in ballast, was torpedoed and sunk in the North Sea 10 nautical miles (19 km) south east of Aberdeen (57°00.808′N 001°52.158′W) by a Heinkel He 115 of 706 Küstenfliegergruppe, Luftwaffe with the loss of 26 of her crew.
Duilio	Regia Marina	World War II: Battle of Taranto: The Andrea Doria-class battleship was torpedoed and damaged off Taranto by Fairey Swordfish aircraft based on HMS Illustrious (Royal Navy) and was beached.
Littorio	Regia Marina	World War II: Battle of Taranto: The Littorio-class battleship was damaged off Taranto by Fairey Swordfish aircraft based on HMS Illustrious (Royal Navy). She was beached but later sank.
Novadoc	Canada	Armistice Day Blizzard: The cargo ship was driven ashore and wrecked in Lake Michigan near Pentwater, Michigan, United States. All but two crew saved by the tugboat Three Brothers II (United States).
Porthcarrack	United Kingdom	The 406 GRT coaster on a trip from Barry for Hayle with a cargo of coal, ran aground near the mouth of the Ogmore River in a storm and subsequently foundered with the loss of four of her crew.
Ravnanger	Norway	World War II: The 3,371 GRT cargo ship on a passage from Middlesbrough for Sydney in ballast, was bombed and sunk in the North Sea off Redcar, Yorkshire by Heinkel He 115 aircraft of 506 Küstenfliegergruppe, Luftwaffe with the loss of one of the 40 people on board.
Skarv	United Kingdom	World War II: The 158 GRT coaster on a passage from Swansea for Nash Sands in ballast, struck a mine and sank in the Bristol Channel.
HMT Stella Orion	Royal Navy	World War II: The 417 GRT naval trawler struck a mine and sank in the Thames Estuary north of Herne Bay, Kent. Her crew were rescued.
Tahoe	United States	The motor vessel sank 1/2 nautical mile (930 m) of the Humpback Lighthouse, in the Alexander Archipelago, Territory of Alaska.
Trebartha	United Kingdom	World War II: Convoy EN 23: The 4,597 GRT cargo ship on a passage from Southend for Sydney in ballast, was bombed and damaged in the North Sea 4 nautical miles (7.4 km) off Aberdeen by Heinkel He 115 aircraft of 706 Küstenfliegergruppe, Luftwaffe with the loss of four of her crew. She came ashore north of Cove Bay (57°06.203′N 002°04.250′W). Trebartha broke in two on 15 November and was abandoned as a total loss.
William B. Davock	United States	Armistice Day Blizzard: The cargo ship sank in Lake Michigan with the loss of all 32 crew.

== 12 November ==
List of shipwrecks: 12 November 1940
Ship	State	Description
Antonio Locatelli	Italy	World War II: Battle of the Strait of Otranto: The 5,691 GRT cargo ship travelling in a convoy from Valona to Brindisi, was shelled and sunk in the Strait of Otranto 12 nautical miles (22 km) northwest of Saseno by HMS Ajax, HMS Orion (both Royal Navy) and HMAS Sydney (Royal Australian Navy) with the loss of all hands.
Argus	Trinity House	World War II: The lighthouse tender struck a mine and sank in the Thames Estuary north east of the Isle of Sheppey, Kent with the loss of 34 of her 35 crew.
Capo Vado	Italy	World War II: Battle of the Strait of Otranto: The 4,391 GRT cargo ship travelling in a convoy from Valona to Bari, was shelled and sunk in the Strait of Otranto 12 nautical miles (22 km) northwest of Saseno by HMS Ajax, HMS Orion (both Royal Navy) and HMAS Sydney (Royal Australian Navy).
Catalani	Italy	World War II: Battle of the Strait of Otranto: The 2,429 GRT passenger ship travelling in a convoy from Valona to Brindisi, was shelled and sunk in the Strait of Otranto 12 nautical miles (22 km) northwest of Saseno by HMS Ajax, HMS Orion (both Royal Navy) and HMAS Sydney (Royal Australian Navy).
Premuda	Italy	World War II: Battle of the Strait of Otranto: The 4,427 GRT cargo ship travelling in a convoy from Valona to Brindisi, was shelled and sunk in the Strait of Otranto 12 nautical miles (22 km) northwest of Saseno by HMS Ajax, HMS Orion (both Royal Navy) and HMAS Sydney (Royal Australian Navy).
Witte Zee	Royal Netherlands Navy	The 465 GRT salvage tug on a passage from Penzance for Lamlash, ran aground at Oxwich Point, Glamorgan, United Kingdom and was wrecked.

== 13 November ==
List of shipwrecks: 13 November 1940
Ship	State	Description
Anvers	Belgium	World War II: Convoy WN 35: The 4,398 GRT cargo ship on a trip from Philadelphia for Methil with a cargo of steel scrap, was bombed and sunk in the North Sea 5 nautical miles (9.3 km) north east of Rattray Head, Aberdeenshire, United Kingdom (57°43′N 1°49′W) by Heinkel He 115 aircraft of 706 Küstenfliegergruppe, Luftwaffe with the loss of one of her 37 crew.
Cape St. Andrew	United Kingdom	World War II: Convoy OB 240: The 5,094 GRT cargo ship on a passage from Middlesbrough for Bombay in ballast, straggled behind the convoy. She was torpedoed and sunk in the Atlantic Ocean west of Tory Island, County Donegal, Ireland (55°14′N 10°29′W) by U-137 (Kriegsmarine) with the loss of fifteen of her 68 crew. Survivors were rescued by HMS Salvonia (Royal Navy).
Charles Edmond	France	World War II: The barkentine (301 GRT) was torpedoed and sunk in the Bay of Biscay 60 nautical miles (110 km) off the mouth of the Gironde (45°41′N 2°57′E) by HMS Tigris (Royal Navy). Three crew were lost.
Dekabrist	Soviet Navy	The Dekabrist-class submarine sank in Motovsky Bay during a diving exercise with the loss of all 53 crew.
Empire Wind	United Kingdom	The cargo ship was bombed and sunk in the Atlantic Ocean (53°48′N 15°52′W by Focke-Wulf Fw 200 aircraft of I Staffeln, Kampfgeschwader 40, Luftwaffe. Her crew were rescued by HMS Arrow (Royal Navy).
Leon Martin	United Kingdom	World War II: The 1,951 GRT tanker on a passage from Swansea for Hamble, struck a mine and sank in the English Channel off Falmouth, Cornwall with the loss of sixteen of her crew.
Shipmates	Royal Navy	World War II: The drifter was bombed and sunk at Dover, Kent by Luftwaffe aircraft.
St. Catherine	United Kingdom	World War II: Convoy WN 35: The 1,216 GRT cargo ship on a trip from Aberdeen for Kirkwall with general cargo, was torpedoed and sunk in the North Sea off Aberdeen by Heinkel He 115 aircraft of 706 Küstenfliegergruppe, Luftwaffe with the loss of fifteen lives.
Wilhelmsburg	Germany	The tanker ran aground at Boulogne, Pas-de-Calais, France and was wrecked.

== 14 November ==
List of shipwrecks: 14 November 1940
Ship	State	Description
Buoyant	United Kingdom	World War II: The coaster struck a mine and sank in the North Sea off Skegness, Lincolnshire. Six of her crew were killed.
Fishpool	United Kingdom	World War II: The cargo ship was bombed and damaged in the Atlantic Ocean south west of Rockall, Inverness-shire (approx 55°00′N 17°04′W) and was abandoned. She was subsequently towed in to the Clyd by the tug Assurance (United Kingdom). Fishpool was later repaired and returned to service.
Maurice Margueritte	Belgium	World War II: The fishing vessel struck a mine and sank in the English Channel off Gravelines, Nord, France. Three of her crew were killed.
HMS Ristango	Royal Navy	The boom defence vessel fouled the boom and sank at Sheerness, Kent.
Teddy	Norway	World War II: The tanker was scuttled in the Indian Ocean by Atlantis (Kriegsmarine). She had been captured on 8 November at 5°35′N 88°22′E. Her 32 crew were rescued and landed in a Japanese port.

== 15 November ==
List of shipwrecks: 15 November 1940
Ship	State	Description
Amenity	United Kingdom	World War II: The coaster (297 GRT) struck a mine and sank in the North Sea off Spurn Head, Yorkshire. Her seven crew were rescued.
Apapa	United Kingdom	World War II: Convoy SL 53: The passenger ship (9,333 GRT, 1927) was bombed and sunk in the Atlantic Ocean 200 nautical miles (370 km) west of Achill Head, County Mayo, Ireland (54°34′N 16°47′W) by a Focke-Wulf Fw 200 aircraft of I Staffeln, Kampfgeschwader 40 with the loss of 23 lives. She was carrying 95 passengers from Lagos to Liverpool and a crew of 158. Her cargo of gold was valued at £19,188. Survivors were rescued by Mary Kingsley and New Columbia (both United Kingdom).
Blue Galleon	United Kingdom	World War II: Convoy FN 34: The coaster was bombed and sunk in the North Sea off Happisburgh, Norfolk by Luftwaffe aircraft with the loss of three of her crew.
HMT Dungeness	Royal Navy	World War II: The naval trawler was bombed and damaged in the North Sea off Happisburgh. She was declared a constructive total loss.
HMS Guardsman	Royal Navy	World War II: The tug struck a mine and sank in the North Sea off North Foreland, Kent with the loss of two of her crew.
Havbør	Norway	World War II: The tanker was torpedoed and sunk in the Atlantic Ocean off the coast of Sierra Leone (4°24′N 13°46′W) by U-65 (Kriegsmarine) with the loss of 29 of her 33 crew. Survivors were rescued by Baron Ardrossan (United Kingdom).
Kohinur	United Kingdom	World War II: Convoy OB 235: The cargo ship was torpedoed and sunk in the Atlantic Ocean off Freetown, Sierra Leone (4°24′N 13°46′W by U-65 (Kriegsmarine) with the loss of 48 of her 85 crew. Survivors were rescued by City of Pittsburg (United Kingdom).
Penryn	United Kingdom	The coaster collided with another vessel in Liverpool Bay and sank.
HMT Sea Ranger	Royal Navy	World War II:The 125.2-foot (38.2 m), 263-ton anti-submarine naval trawler was damaged by German aircraft off Hammonds Knoll, and beached on Haisborough Sands, Norfolk. Declared a Total Loss.

== 16 November ==
List of shipwrecks: 16 November 1940
Ship	State	Description
HMT Arsenal	Royal Navy	The naval trawler collided with ORP Burza (Polish Navy) in the Clyde Estuary (55°46′25″N 4°59′05″W) and sank. Survivors were rescued by HMS Arrow (Royal Navy) and the tug Superman (United Kingdom).
Fabian	United Kingdom	World War II: The cargo ship was torpedoed and sunk in the Atlantic Ocean (2°49′N 15°29′W) by U-65 (Kriegsmarine) with the loss of six of her 39 crew. Survivors were rescued by British Statesman (United Kingdom).
Planter	United Kingdom	World War II: Convoy SLS 53: The cargo ship romped ahead of the convoy. She was torpedoed and sunk in the Atlantic Ocean west of County Donegal, Ireland (55°38′N 8°38′W) by U-137 (Kriegsmarine) with the loss of 13 of the 73 people on board. Survivors were rescued by HMS Clare (Royal Navy).
Phrygia	Kriegsmarine	World War II: The tanker was scuttled in the Gulf of Mexico when her crew mistook the neutral USS Broome, USS McCormick and USS Plunkett (all United States Navy) for Allied warships.
WBS 4 Hinrich Freese	Kriegsmarine	World War II: The weather ship was deliberately run aground and wrecked on Jan Mayen Island, Norway whilst under attack from HMS Naiad (Royal Navy). Two of her crew drowned, and the survivors were captured.

== 17 November ==
List of shipwrecks: 17 November 1940
Ship	State	Description
Saint Germain	United Kingdom	World War II: Convoy HG 46: The cargo ship was torpedoed and damaged in the Atlantic Ocean off County Donegal, Ireland (55°40′N 8°40′W) by U-137 (Kriegsmarine). She sank the next day at 55°20′N 8°50′W. All eighteen crew were rescued by HMS Mallow (Royal Navy).
Veronica	Sweden	World War II: Convoy HG 46: The cargo ship was torpedoed and sunk in the Atlantic Ocean off the coast of County Donegal (55°20′N 8°45′W) by U-137 (Kriegsmarine) with the loss of seventeen of her Twenty crew. Survivors were rescued by a British fishing vessel.

== 18 November ==
List of shipwrecks: 18 November 1940
Ship	State	Description
Ability	United Kingdom	World War II: The 293 GRT motor barge on a passage from London for Yarmouth with cement, hit a mine and sank in the North Sea 2 nautical miles (3.7 km) south-southeast of Clacton (51°45′N 1°11′E). All seven crew were rescued by motor lifeboat Edward Z. Dresden.
Ardita IV	Italy	World War II: The 54 GRT steam tug was bombed and sunk off Valona by Potez 633 B2 bombers of 31st Bombardment Squadron of Hellenic Air Force.
Congonian	United Kingdom	World War II: The 5,065 GRT tanker on a passage from Liverpool for Freetown in ballast, was torpedoed and sunk in the Atlantic Ocean (8°21′N 16°12′W) by U-65 (Kriegsmarine) with the loss of one of her 36 crew. Survivors were rescued by HMS Devonshire (Royal Navy).
HMT Go Ahead	Royal Navy	World War II: The 100 GRT converted drifter collided with another vessel and sank in the River Medway at Queenborough, Kent.
Lillian Moller	United Kingdom	World War II: Convoy SL 53S: The 5,285 GRT cargo ship on a trip from Calcutta and Table Bay for London with a cargo of cereals, was torpedoed and sunk in the Atlantic Ocean west of Ireland (52°57′N 18°03′W) by Maggiore Baracca (Regia Marina) with the loss of all 49 hands.
Nestlea	United Kingdom	World War II: Convoy SL 53S: The 4,274 GRT cargo ship on a trip from Takoradi for Workington with a cargo of manganese ore, straggled behind the convoy. She was bombed and sunk in the Celtic Sea 55 nautical miles (102 km) south-southwest of Fastnet (50°38′N 10°00′W) by Focke-Wulf Fw 200 aircraft of I Staffeln, Kampfgeschwader 40, Luftwaffe. Her 39 crew were rescued.
Nowshera	United Kingdom	World War II: The 7,920 GRT cargo ship on a trip from Adelaide for England via Durban with a cargo of wheat, zinc ore and wool, was shelled and sunk in the Indian Ocean west of Australia (31°02′S 100°51′E) by Pinguin (Kriegsmarine). Her 122 crew were rescued and taken prisoners of war.

== 19 November ==
List of shipwrecks: 19 November 1940
Ship	State	Description
HMT Fontenoy	Royal Navy	World War II: The 275 GRT naval trawler was bombed and sunk in the North Sea off Lowestoft, Suffolk (52°31′N 1°55′E) by Luftwaffe aircraft. Her crew were rescued.
Santa Rita	United States	The fishing vessel was destroyed by fire 2 nautical miles (3.7 km) south of Baranof, Territory of Alaska. The only person aboard survived.

== 20 November ==
List of shipwrecks: 20 November 1940
Ship	State	Description
R-51 Ardita III	Regia Marina	World War II: The 57 GRT auxiliary minesweeper, a converted steam tug, was bombed and sunk at Assab, Italian Somaliland by Royal Air Force aircraft.
Confienza	Regia Marina	The Palestro-class destroyer collided with Capitano A. Cecchi (Regia Marina) in the evening of 19 November off Brindisi, and sank shortly after midnight. Two of her crew were killed, two were reported missing and a fifth died of his wounds.
HMAS Goorangai	Royal Australian Navy	The 223 GRT auxiliary minesweeper/trawler collided with Duntroon (United Kingdom) and sank at Port Philip Bay, Victoria with the loss of all 24 crew.
Maimoa	United Kingdom	World War II: The 8,011 GRT cargo ship on a trip from Brisbane for England with general cargo, was shelled and sunk in the Indian Ocean west of Fremantle (32°14′S 100°56′E) by Pinguin (Kriegsmarine). All 87 crew were taken as prisoners of war by Pinguin.
S-38	Kriegsmarine	World War II: The Type 1939/40 schnellboot was shelled and sunk in the North Sea off Lowestoft, Suffolk, United Kingdom by HMS Campbell and HMS Garth (both Royal Navy). Five of her 23 crew were killed; the survivors were captured.
Snorre I	Germany	World War II: The coaster struck a mine and sank at Kjøkkelvik, Norway.

== 21 November ==
List of shipwrecks: 21 November 1940
Ship	State	Description
Birgitte Raabe	Germany	World War II: The 375 GRT coaster on a passage from Stugsund to Germany with a cargo of timber, collided with another vessel in the Baltic Sea 18 nautical miles (33 km) south of Utklippan, Sweden and was severely damaged. Declared unsalvageable, she was scuttled.
Coastville	United Kingdom	The 423 GRT coaster on a passage from Bangor for Liverpool in ballast, was driven ashore in a storm and ran aground on rocks at Ballymacormick. Refloated in December 1940, and broken up.
Dakotian	United Kingdom	World War II: The 6,426 GRT cargo ship on a trip from Swansea for St. Jonh with general cargo, struck a mine and sank off Milford Haven, Pembrokeshire (51°42′12″N 5°08′19″W). Her 49 crew were rescued.
Daydawn	United Kingdom	World War II: Convoy OB 244: The 4,768 GRT cargo ship on a trip from Barry for Río Santiago with a cargo of coal, was torpedoed and sunk in the Atlantic Ocean northwest of County Donegal, Ireland (56°30′N 14°10′W) by U-103 (Kriegsmarine) with the loss of two of her 39 crew. Survivors were rescued by HMS Castleton and HMS Rhododendron (both Royal Navy).
NB 17 Wespe	Kriegsmarine	The 124 GRT harbor defense vessel, former Norwegian whaler Scapa, hit a mine and sank off Bergen. She was later refloated, repaired and returned to service as V 5517 Natter.
Orungal	Australia	The 5,826 GRT cargo ship on a trip from Sydney for Melbourne with general cargo, ran aground at Barwon Heads, Victoria. Salvage operations were abandoned after a fire and several explosions in her engine room on 13 December; the ship was declared a total loss.
Port Brisbane	United Kingdom	World War II: The 8,315 GRT reefer on a voyage from Adelaide for England via Durban with general cargo, was shelled and sunk in the Indian Ocean (29°29′S 95°35′E) by Pinguin (Kriegsmarine) with the loss of a crew member from the 93 people on board. The 27 crew not taken on board Pinguin as prisoners of war were rescued by HMAS Canberra (Royal Australian Navy).
Victoria	Greece	World War II: Convoy OB 244: The 6,085 GRT cargo ship on a passage from Avonmouth for Botwood in ballast, was torpedoed and sunk in the Atlantic Ocean north west of County Donegal (56°17′N 14°12′W by U-103 (Kriegsmarine). Her 27 crew were rescued by HMS Castleton (Royal Navy).
HMT Xmas Rose	Royal Navy	World War II: The 96 GRT naval drifter struck a mine and sank in the Thames Estuary off Walton-on-the-Naze (51°47′45″N 1°25′30″E) with the loss of four of her crew.

== 22 November ==
List of shipwrecks: 22 November 1940
Ship	State	Description
Cree	United Kingdom	World War II: Convoy SL 53S: The 4,791 GRT cargo ship on a trip from Pepel for Workington with a cargo of iron ore, straggled behind the convoy. She was torpedoed and sunk in the Atlantic Ocean west of Ireland (54°39′N 18°50′W) by U-123 (Kriegsmarine) with the loss of all 45 crew.
HMT Ethel Taylor	Royal Navy	World War II: The non-standard Castle-class trawler struck a mine and sank off the mouth of the River Tyne. Crew rescued by the Cullercoats Lifeboat, Westmorland.
Glen	United Kingdom	World War II: The barge struck a mine and sank in the River Forth at Low Torry, Fife.
Hercules	United Kingdom	World War II: The tug struck a mine and sank at the mouth of the River Tyne (55°01′N 1°23′W) with the loss of five of her crew.
ML-127	Royal Navy	World War II: The Fairmile B motor launch struck a mine and sank in the North Sea off Clacton-on-Sea, Essex with the loss of eleven of her crew.
Pikepool	United Kingdom	World War II: The 3,683 GRT cargo ship on a passage from Glasgow for Barry in ballast, struck a mine and sank in the Bristol Channel 25 nautical miles (46 km) south of Linney Head, Pembrokeshire with the loss of seventeen of her 32 crew.

== 23 November ==
List of shipwrecks: 23 November 1940
Ship	State	Description
Anten	Sweden	World War II: Convoy OB 223: The 5,135 GRT cargo ship on a passage from Liverpool for Capetown in ballast, was torpedoed and damaged in the Atlantic Ocean west of the Hebrides, United Kingdom (56°57′N 18°18′W) by U-123 (Kriegsmarine) with the loss on one of her 33 crew. The ship was abandoned; survivors were rescued by HMS Sandwich (Royal Navy). Anten sank on 25 November at 57°15′N 17°40′W.
Bonaparte	United Kingdom	World War II: The 38 GRT steam tug was bombed and sunk near Northam Bridge during the Luftwaffe raid on Southampton.
Bradfyne	United Kingdom	World War II: Convoy SC 11: The 4,740 GRT cargo ship on a trip from Montreal for Belfast with a cargo of grain, was torpedoed and sunk in the Atlantic Ocean 170 nautical miles (310 km) north of Ireland (55°04′N 12°15′W) by U-100 (Kriegsmarine) with the loss of 39 of her 43 crew. Survivors were rescued by Norse King (Norway).
Bruse	Norway	World War II: Convoy SC 11: The 2,205 GRT cargo ship on a trip from Sydney for Ipswich with a cargo of timber, was torpedoed and severely damaged in the Atlantic Ocean (55°04′N 12°15′W) U-100 (Kriegsmarine). She broke in two with the loss of sixteen of her 22 crew; the bow section sank. The survivors abandoned ship and were rescued by HMCS Skeena (Royal Canadian Navy). Bruse was taken in tow on 28 November and arrived at the Clyde two days later. She was consequently scrapped.
Bussum	Netherlands	World War II: Convoy SC 11: The 3,636 GRT cargo ship on a trip from Montreal for Belfast with a cargo of grain, was torpedoed and sunk in the Atlantic Ocean north of Ireland (55°39′N 8°58′W) by U-100 (Kriegsmarine). Her 29 crew were rescued by HMCS Ottawa (Royal Canadian Navy).
HMS Duchess of Cornwall	Royal Navy	The 302 GRT auxiliary paddle minesweeper was bombed and sunk at Royal Pier during the Luftwaffe raid on Southampton. Later raised, repaired and returned to service.
HMT Good Design	Royal Navy	The 46 GRT patrol vessel hit a mine, broke in two and sank northeast of Inchkeith, Fife with a loss of 2 men.
Justitia	United Kingdom	World War II: Convoy SC 11: The 4,562 GRT cargo ship on a trip from Savannah for London with a cargo of steel and timber, was torpedoed and sunk in the Atlantic Ocean north west of County Donegal, Ireland (55°00′N 13°10′W) by U-100 (Kriegsmarine) with the loss of thirteen of her 39 crew. Survivors were rescued by HMS Enchantress (Royal Navy).
King Idwal	United Kingdom	World War II: Convoy OB 244: The 5,115 GRT cargo ship on a passage from Liverpool for Baltimore in ballast, was torpedoed and sunk in the Atlantic Ocean west of the Outer Hebrides (56°44′N 19°13′W) by U-123 (Kriegsmarine) with the loss of twelve of her 40 crew. Survivors were rescued by HMS Sandwich (Royal Navy).
Kolchis	Greece	World War II: Convoy SC 13: The 2,219 GRT cargo ship on a voyage from Sorel for Belfast with a cargo of grain foundered in a gale in the Atlantic Ocean with a loss of her entire crew of 23.
Leise Mærsk	United Kingdom	World War II: Convoy SC 11: The 3,136 GRT cargo ship on a voyage from Trois-Rivières for Sharpness with general cargo and grain, was torpedoed and sunk in the Atlantic Ocean west of the Outer Hebrides (55°30′N 11°00′W) by U-100 (Kriegsmarine) with the loss of seventeen of her 24 crew. Survivors were rescued by a Dutch salvage tug.
Mary Arnold	United States	While towing the dredge Progress (United States), the tug sank without loss of life in 60 feet (18 m) of water 2 nautical miles (3.7 km; 2.3 mi) south of the breachway at Charlestown, Rhode Island.
New Comet	United Kingdom	World War II: The drifter struck a mine off the mouth of the River Tyne and was beached. She was later refloated, but sank on 28 February 1941.
Oakcrest	United Kingdom	World War II: Convoy OB 244: The 5,407 GRT cargo ship on a passage from Birkenhead for New York in ballast, straggled behind the convoy. She was torpedoed and sunk in the Atlantic Ocean west of Ireland (53°00′N 17°00′W) by U-123 (Kriegsmarine) with the loss of 35 of her 41 crew.
Ootmarsum	Netherlands	World War II: Convoy SC 11: The 3,628 GRT cargo ship on a trip from Sydney for Newport with a cargo of iron ore, was torpedoed and sunk in the Atlantic Ocean 350 nautical miles (650 km) west of Inishtrahull Island, County Donegal, Ireland by U-100 (Kriegsmarine) with the loss of all 25 crew.
Progress	United States	While under tow by the tug Mary Arnold (United States), the dredger sank in 60 feet (18 m) of water 2 nautical miles (3.7 km; 2.3 mi) south of the breachway at Charlestown, Rhode Island.
Sailor King	United Kingdom	World War II: The drifter struck a mine and sank in the North Sea off Brightlingsea, Essex.
Salonica	Norway	World War II: Convoy SC 11: The 2,694 GRT cargo ship on a trip from Pugwash for Newcastle with a cargo of pit props, was torpedoed and sunk in the Atlantic Ocean west of County Donegal (55°16′N 12°14′W) by U-100 (Kriegsmarine) with the loss of nine of her 25 crew. Survivors were rescued by HMS Enchantress (Royal Navy).
Tymeric	United Kingdom	World War II: Convoy OB 223: The 5,228 GRT cargo ship on a trip from Hull for Buenos Aires with a cargo of coal, was torpedoed and sunk in the Atlantic Ocean (57°00′N 20°30′W) by U-123 (Kriegsmarine) with the loss of 71 of her 76 crew. Survivors were rescued by HMS Sandwich (Royal Navy).

== 24 November ==
List of shipwrecks: 24 November 1940
Ship	State	Description
Alice Marie	United Kingdom	World War II: The 2,206 GRT collier on a trip from Methil for London with a cargo of coal, struck a mine and sank in the Thames Estuary 4/5 nautical mile (1.5 km) off the Knob Lightship ( Trinity House). Her crew were rescued.
Alma Dawson	United Kingdom	World War II: Convoy SC 11: The 3,985 GRT cargo ship on a trip from Montreal for Ipswich with general cargo, struck a mine and sank off the north coast of Northern Ireland (55°32′N 6°44′W). Her crew were rescued by Spurt (Norway).
HMT Amethyst	Royal Navy	World War II: The 447 GRT anti-submarine naval trawler struck a mine at Barrow Deep in the Thames Estuary and sank. Her crew were rescued by HMT Le Tiger (Royal Navy).
Appolonia	Netherlands	World War II: The 2,086 GRT coastal tanker on a passage from Plymouth for Avonmouth in ballast, was shelled, torpedoed and sunk in the Atlantic Ocean 8 nautical miles (15 km) south west of The Lizard, Cornwall, United Kingdom by Z10 Hans Lody, Z20 Karl Galster and Z4 Richard Beitzen (all Kriegsmarine) with the loss of fifteen of her crew.
Behar	United Kingdom	World War II: The 6,100 GRT cargo ship on a trip from Clyde for Milford Haven with government stores, struck a mine and was damaged off Milford Haven (51°42′N 5°07′W). She was beached near Great Castle Head, but salvage attempts proved to be unsuccessful due to poor weather and further German mining, and she was declared a constructive total loss and broken up in situ. All 71 people on board survived.
HMY Gael	Royal Navy	World War II: The armed yacht struck a mine and sank in the Humber Estuary off Spurn Point, Yorkshire.
Llandovery Castle	United Kingdom	The cargo liner was severely damaged in a Luftwaffe air raid on Southampton, Hampshire. Her conversion to a hospital ship was subsequently completed.
Marguerite Simmone	Belgium	World War II: The fishing vessel was shelled and sunk in the English Channel eight nautical miles (15 km; 9.2 mi) south east by south of the Wolf Rock, Cornwall by Z10 Hans Lody, Z20 Karl Galster and Z4 Richard Beitzen (all Kriegsmarine). Her crew survived.
Port Hobart	United Kingdom	World War II: The 7,448 GRT cargo ship on a voyage from Liverpool for Auckland with general cargo, was shelled and sunk in the Atlantic Ocean off the Azores, Portugal (24°44′N 58°21′W) by Admiral Scheer (Kriegsmarine). Her 73 crew were taken as prisoners of war.
Preserver	United Kingdom	World War II: The 630 GRT requisitioned salvage vessel struck a German aerial-laid mine and sank at Milford Haven, Pembrokeshire with the loss of five of her crew.
Ryal	United Kingdom	World War II: The 367 GRT coaster on a passage from London for Middlesbrough, struck a mine and sank in the North Sea (51°32′N 1°04′E) with the loss of eight of her nine crew.
Thomas M.	United Kingdom	World War II: The 310 GRT coaster on a trip from Blyth for Norwich with a cargo of coal, struck a mine and sank in the North Sea off Gorleston-on-Sea, Suffolk with the loss of seven of her crew.

== 25 November ==
List of shipwrecks: 25 November 1940
Ship	State	Description
HMT Conquistador	Royal Navy	The 224 GRT minesweeping naval trawler collided with another vessel and sank in the Thames Estuary while transporting survivors of HMT Kennymore (Royal Navy). Wreck later salvaged and broken up.
Holmwood	New Zealand	World War II: German auxiliary cruiser Komet (Kriegsmarine) shelled and sank the coaster in the Pacific Ocean off the Chatham Islands (43°44′S 177°30′W). All 30 people on board were rescued.
HMT Kennymore	Royal Navy	World War II: The 225 GRT minesweeping naval trawler struck a mine and sank in the Thames Estuary with the loss of her Captain and three of her crew. Some of the survivors were rescued by HMT Conquistador (Royal Navy).
HMS ML 111	Royal Navy	World War II: The Fairmile A motor launch struck a mine and sank off the mouth of the Humber with the loss of two of her crew.
Patria	France	Patria World War II: Patria disaster: The British captured passenger ship (11,885 GRT) with about 1,800 people on board, was sabotaged, exploded, capsized and sank in the Port of Haifa, Palestine with the loss of many lives. The wreck was refloated in 1952 and scrapped.
Tees Hopper No.3	United Kingdom	World War II: The hopper barge struck a mine and sank in the North Sea off Stockton on Tees, County Durham (54°40′N 1°07′W). Her crew were rescued.

== 26 November ==
List of shipwrecks: 26 November 1940
Ship	State	Description
HMS Medoc	Royal Navy	World War II: The training ship was torpedoed and sunk in the English Channel off Rame Head, Cornwall by a Luftwaffe aircraft with the loss of 42 of her crew.
Grijalva	Nicaragua	The cargo ship departed from Ciudad del Carmen, for Veracruz, Mexico. No further trace.
Ovington Court	United Kingdom	The 6,095 GRT cargo ship on a trip from Mauritius to England with a cargo of sugar and copra, was driven ashore in a severe storm at Durban, Union of South Africa. She was a total loss.

== 27 November ==
List of shipwrecks: 27 November 1940
Ship	State	Description
Diplomat	United Kingdom	World War II: Convoy HX 88: The cargo ship straggled behind the convoy. She was torpedoed and sunk in the Atlantic Ocean north west of County Donegal, Ireland (55°42′N 11°37′W) by U-104 (Kriegsmarine) with the loss of fourteen of her 53 crew. Survivors were rescued by HMS Active (Royal Navy).
HMT Elk	Royal Navy	World War II: The naval trawler struck a mine and sank in the English Channel off Plymouth, Devon. Her crew were rescued.
Glenmoor	United Kingdom	World War II: Convoy OB 248: The cargo ship straggled behind the convoy. She was torpedoed and sunk in the Atlantic Ocean 167 nautical miles (309 km) north west of the Slyne Head Lighthouse, County Galway, Ireland (54°35′N 14°31′W) by U-103 (Kriegsmarine) with the loss of 31 of her 33 crew. Survivors were rescued by HMS Harvester and HMS Havelock (both Royal Navy).
Havborg	Norway	World War II: The cargo ship was torpedoed and sunk in the Weser by Royal Air Force aircraft with the loss of four of her crew.
Irene Maria	United Kingdom	World War II: The cargo ship was torpedoed and sunk in the Atlantic Ocean north west of County Donegal by U-95 (Kriegsmarine) with the loss of all 25 crew.
Lisieux	Free French Naval Forces	Convoy SC 13: The cargo ship foundered in the Atlantic Ocean off the coast of Newfoundland (48°20′N 47°15′W) with the loss of fourteen of her 30 crew. Survivors were rescued by Bernhard (Norway).
HMS Port Napier	Royal Navy	The wreck of HMS Port Napier on 18 May 2010. The auxiliary minelayer exploded and sank in Loch Alsh, Argyllshire (57°17′N 5°44′W) after a fire had developed the previous day.
Rangitane	New Zealand	World War II: The passenger ship was shelled and sunk in the Pacific Ocean east of New Zealand (36°48′S 175°07′W) by Komet and Orion (both Kriegsmarine) with the loss of sixteen of the 296 people aboard.

== 28 November ==
List of shipwrecks: 28 November 1940
Ship	State	Description
Eugena Cambanis	Greece	World War II: Convoy SC 13: The 3,470 GRT cargo ship on a trip from Sainte-Anne-des-Monts for Belfast with a cargo of lumber was abandoned in a gale after her cargo shifted in the Atlantic Ocean off the coast of Newfoundland (46°53′N 48°37′W). Sources conflict on survivors, with some saying none survived and others stating they were rescued by Urla (United Kingdom). The wreck was destroyed by Hilda Knudsen (Norway) on 19 December.
HMT Manx Prince	Royal Navy	World War II: The 220 GRT naval trawler struck a mine and sank in the North Sea at the entrance to the Humber, three miles (5 km) off Spurn Point, Yorkshire. HMT Cortina (Royal Navy) rescued her crew.
Mount Athos	Greece	World War II: Convoy OB 248: The 3,578 GRT cargo ship on a trip from Barry for Freetown with a cargo of coal, was torpedoed and sunk in the Atlantic Ocean west of Ireland (55°30′N 15°25′W) by U-103 (Kriegsmarine) with the loss of nineteen of her crew.
St. Elwyn	United Kingdom	World War II: Convoy OB 249: The 4,940 GRT cargo ship on a trip from Hull for Santos with a cargo of coal, was torpedoed and sunk in the Atlantic Ocean 500 nautical miles (930 km) east of the Bishop Rock (55°30′N 19°30′W) by U-103 (Kriegsmarine) with the loss of three passengers and 24 of her 40 crew. Leeds City (United Kingdom) rescued the survivors.

== 29 November ==
List of shipwrecks: 29 November 1940
Ship	State	Description
Aid	United Kingdom	World War II: Operation Seydlitz: The 134 GRT tug travelling from Southampton for Falmouth, was shelled and sunk in the English Channel 8 nautical miles (15 km) off Start Point, Devon by Z10 Hans Lody, Z20 Karl Galster and Z4 Richard Beitzen (all Kriegsmarine) with the loss of five of her ten crew.
BHC 10	United Kingdom	World War II: Operation Seydlitz: The 284 GRT barge being towed by Abeille XIV(Free France) from Southampton for Falmouth, was shelled and sunk in the English Channel 8 nautical miles (15 km) off Start Point by Z10 Hans Lody, Z20 Karl Galster and Z4 Richard Beitzen (all Kriegsmarine) with the loss of three of her eight crew.
HMT Calverton	Royal Navy	World War II: The 214 GRT minesweeping naval trawler struck a mine and sank off the mouth of the Humber with the loss of two crew.
HMS Javelin	Royal Navy	World War II: Operation Seydlitz: The J-class destroyer was shelled, torpedoed and severely damaged in the English Channel by Z10 Hans Lody, Z20 Karl Galster and Z4 Richard Beitzen (all Kriegsmarine), with the loss of 45 officers and ratings. She lost both bow and stern. Repairs took almost a year to complete.
Parthenia	United Kingdom	World War II: Convoy HX 88: The cargo ship collided with Robert F. Hand (United Kingdom) and sank in the Firth of Clyde 7 nautical miles (13 km) south west of the Sanda Lightship ( Trinity House).
Stoomloodsvaartuig 4	United Kingdom	World War II: Operation Seydlitz: The 461 GRT pilot boat, former Dutch vessel Hellevoetsluis, was shelled and sunk in the English Channel by Z10 Hans Lody, Z20 Karl Galster and Z4 Richard Beitzen (all Kriegsmarine) with a loss of 6 crew.

== 30 November ==
List of shipwrecks: 30 November 1940
Ship	State	Description
Aracataca	United Kingdom	World War II: The 5,378 GRT cargo ship on a trip from Port Antonio for Avonmouth with a cargo of bananas and grapefruit, was torpedoed and sunk in the Atlantic Ocean (57°08′N 20°50′W) by U-101 (Kriegsmarine) with the loss of 36 of her 69 crew and passengers. Of the 33 survivors, eighteen were rescued by Potaro, and fifteen by Djurdjura (both United Kingdom).
HMT Chestnut	Royal Navy	World War II: The Tree-class trawler struck a mine and sank in the North Sea off North Foreland, Kent. Her crew were rescued.
Port Wellington	United Kingdom	World War II: The 7,868 GRT reefer on a trip from Adelaide for England via Durban with general cargo, was captured in the Indian Ocean (30°50′S 73°20′E) by Pinguin (Kriegsmarine) with the loss of two crew. She was scuttled the next day; survivors were taken as prisoners of war.

== Unknown date ==
List of shipwrecks: Unknown date 1940
Ship	State	Description
Quarto	Regia Marina	The decommissioned protected cruiser was sunk in weapons testing at Livorno.
U-104	Kriegsmarine	World War II: The Type IXB submarine's last contact was on 19 November, reported missing 28 November. Sunk on or about 28 November 1940 in the Atlantic Ocean north-west of Tory Island, County Donegal, Ireland (approximately 55°30′N 8°00′W) by a mine in the British minefield SN 44. Lost with all 49 crew.
