= SS Novadoc =

Great Lakes freighter lost in the Armistice Day Storm in Lake Michigan

Coordinates: 43°41.801′N 086°30.954′W

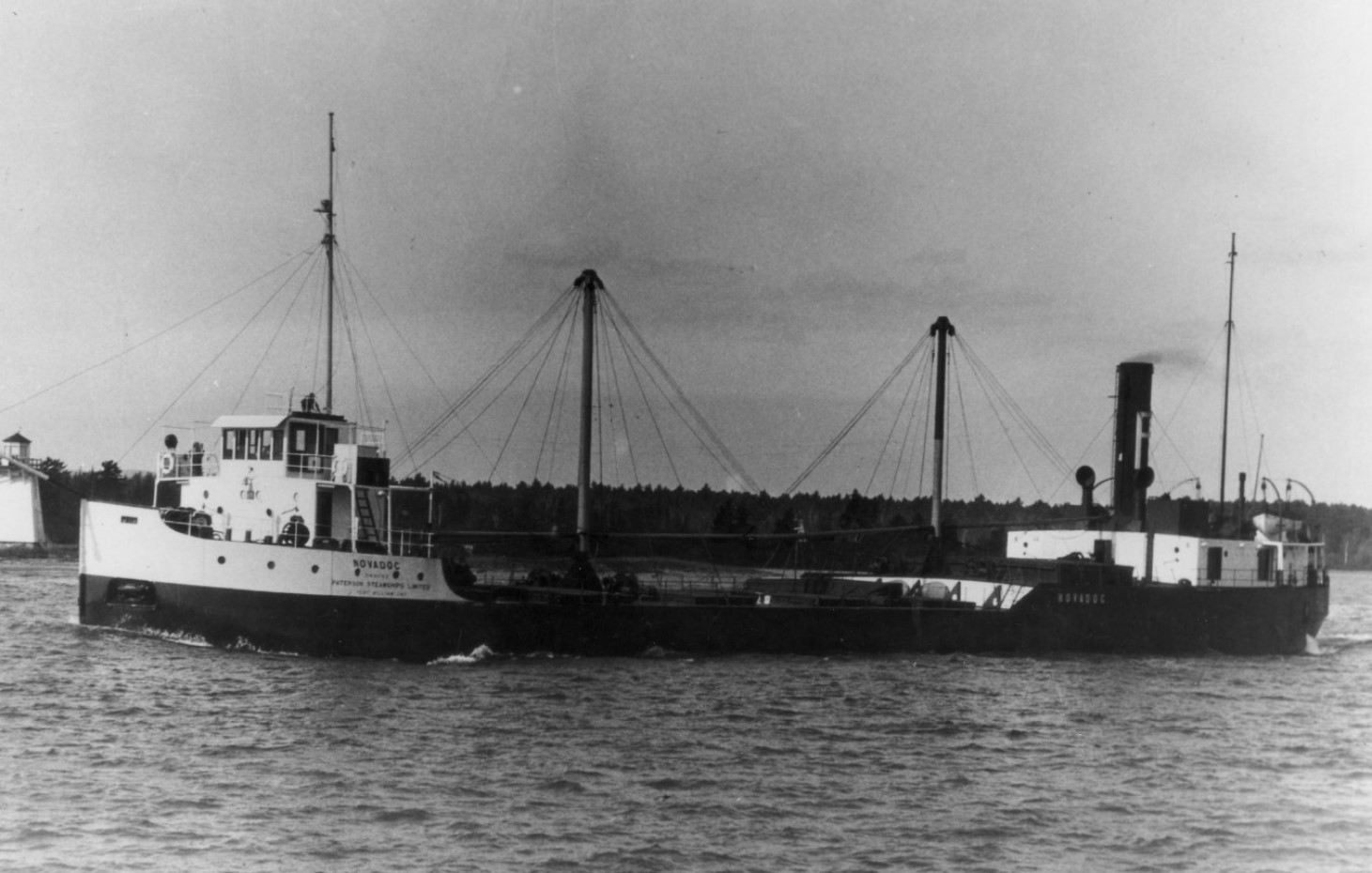
- SS Novadoc, Sometime before 1940.

History

United States
- Name: SS Novadoc
- Builder: Swan, Hunter & Wigham Richardson, Ltd.
- Launched: 1928
- In service: 1928
- Out of service: 1940
- Fate: Sunk, November 11, 1940

General characteristics
- Type: Great Lakes freighter
- Length: 77.1 m (253 ft)
- Beam: 54 ft (16 m)
- Propulsion: Triple expansion steam engine; Screw propeller

SS Novadoc was one of three Great Lakes freighters lost in the Armistice Day Storm of 11 November 1940. SS William B. Davock and Anna C. Minch both foundered that same night with complete loss of their crews. All three ships went down between Little Point Sable and Pentwater, Michigan. Unlike the crews of the Davock and Minch, most of the Novadoc′s 19 crew survived the sinking due to the bravery of some local fishermen.

== History ==
Novadoc was of Canadian registry. The vessel was built in 1928 by Swan, Hunter & Wigham Richardson, Ltd. at Wallsend-on-Tyne, England. the steel-hulled Novadoc was just 250 feet (76 meters) in length, having been designed to navigate comfortably through the canals and locks of the lower Great Lakes.

== Storm ==
Originally, the high winds of the powerful storm came from the southeast, causing the captains of those ships to hug Lake Michigan′s eastern shore to protect their ships. Later, when the winds shifted to the southwest, the ships became fully exposed to the brunt of what is known as a "non-tropical cyclone."

The winds were clocked at 75 miles per hour (121 km/h), driving 20 foot (6.1 m) waves, which is the threshold wind velocity for a hurricane. Already close to the Michigan shoreline because of the earlier storm-fighting tactics, the change in wind direction drove the Novadoc on to the sand bars located about two miles north of Little Point Sable, five miles south of the town of Pentwater. She immediately broke in two, severing her electrical power lines. Novadoc continued to be battered by the high wind and waves, eventually drawing a crowd to Juniper beach.

The United States Coast Guard personnel stationed in Pentwater determined that weather conditions were too severe to offer assistance to the grounded freighter. After 36 hours a fish tug, Three Brothers II, decided to go to Novadoc's assistance. The fish tug's crew was able to rig a breeches buoy from the stricken freighter to the beach directly in front of the Silver Lake sand dunes. In the end, the tug was able to rescue all but 2 from the stricken ship, who had been washed overboard earlier in the storm.
