= German submarine U-104 (1940) =

German World War II submarine

Coordinates: 55°30′N 8°0′W

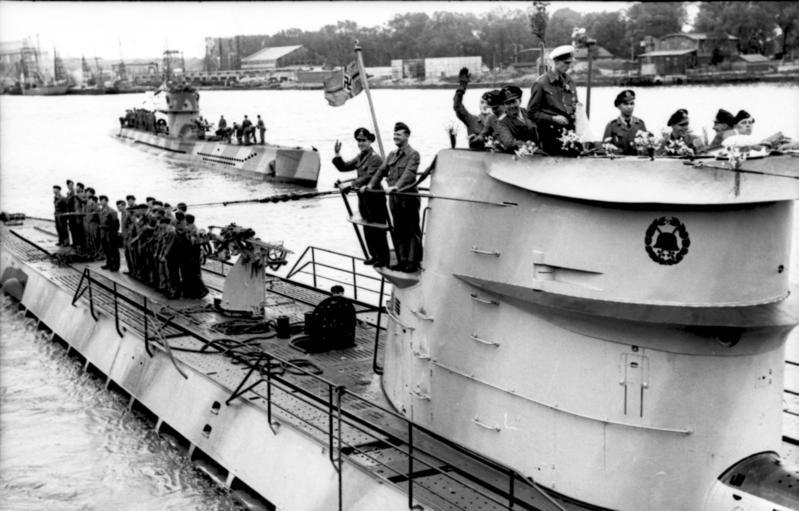
- U-123–an identical U-boat to U-104–leaving Lorient on 8 June 1941

History

Nazi Germany
- Name: U-104
- Ordered: 24 May 1938
- Builder: DeSchiMAG AG Weser, Bremen
- Yard number: 967
- Laid down: 10 November 1939
- Launched: 25 May 1940
- Commissioned: 19 August 1940
- Fate: Sunk by mine around 28 November 1940 in the North Atlantic northwest of Tory Island

General characteristics
- Class & type: Type IXB submarine
- Displacement: 1,051 t (1,034 long tons) surfaced; 1,178 t (1,159 long tons) submerged
- Length: 76.50 m (251 ft) o/a; 58.75 m (192 ft 9 in) pressure hull
- Beam: 6.76 m (22 ft 2 in) o/a; 4.40 m (14 ft 5 in) pressure hull
- Height: 9.60 m (31 ft 6 in)
- Draught: 4.70 m (15 ft 5 in)
- Installed power: 4,400 PS (3,200 kW; 4,300 bhp) (diesels); 1,000 PS (740 kW; 990 shp) (electric)
- Propulsion: 2 shafts; 2 × diesel engines; 2 × electric motors
- Speed: 18.2 kn (33.7 km/h; 20.9 mph) surfaced; 7.3 knots (13.5 km/h; 8.4 mph) submerged
- Range: 12,000 nmi (22,000 km; 14,000 mi) at 10 knots (19 km/h; 12 mph) surfaced; 64 nmi (119 km; 74 mi) at 4 knots (7.4 km/h; 4.6 mph) submerged
- Test depth: 230 m (750 ft)
- Complement: 4 officers, 44 enlisted
- Armament: 6 × torpedo tubes (4 bow, 2 stern); 22 × 53.3 cm (21 in) torpedoes; 1 × 10.5 cm (4.1 in) SK C/32 deck gun (180 rounds); 1 × 3.7 cm (1.5 in) SK C/30 AA gun; 1 × twin 2 cm FlaK 30 AA guns

Service record
- Part of: 2nd U-boat Flotilla; 19 August 1940 – 28 November 1940
- Identification codes: M 07 089
- Commanders: Kptlt. Harald Jürst; 19 August 1940 – 28 November 1940
- Operations: 1 patrol: 12 – 28 November 1940
- Victories: 1 merchant ship sunk (8,240 GRT); 1 merchant ship damaged (10,516 GRT)

German submarine U-104 was a Type IXB U-boat of Nazi Germany's Kriegsmarine during World War II. She was ordered by the Kriegsmarine on 24 May 1938 as part of the German naval rearmament program Plan Z. Her keel was laid down by DeSchiMAG AG Weser in Bremen in November 1939. Following about six and a half months of construction, she was launched on 25 May 1940 and formally commissioned into the Kriegsmarine on 19 August 1940.

U-104 had a very short career, sinking just one enemy vessel and damaging one other during one war patrol. In the middle of her first patrol, U-104 was posted missing off the north coast of Ireland on 30 November 1940 and was presumed sunk in minefield SN 44, which was laid a few days prior to her arrival in the area.

== Construction and design ==
=== Construction ===
U-104 was ordered by the Kriegsmarine on 24 May 1938 (as part of Plan Z and in violation of the Treaty of Versailles). Her keel was laid down on 10 November 1939 by DeSchiMAG AG Weser in Bremen as yard number 967. U-104 was launched on 25 May 1940 and commissioned on 19 August of that year under the command of Kapitänleutnant Harald Jürst.

=== Design ===
Type IXA submarines were slightly larger than the original Type IX submarines, later designated IXA. U-104 had a displacement of 1,051 tonnes (1,034 long tons) when at the surface and 1,178 tonnes (1,159 long tons) while submerged. The U-boat had a total length of 76.50 m (251 ft), a pressure hull length of 58.75 m (192 ft 9 in), a beam of 6.76 m (22 ft 2 in), a height of 9.60 m (31 ft 6 in), and a draught of 4.70 m (15 ft 5 in). The submarine was powered by two MAN M 9 V 40/46 supercharged four-stroke, nine-cylinder diesel engines producing a total of 4,400 metric horsepower (3,240 kW; 4,340 shp) for use while surfaced, two Siemens-Schuckert 2 GU 345/34 double-acting electric motors producing a total of 1,000 metric horsepower (740 kW; 990 shp) for use while submerged. She had two shafts and two 1.92 m (6 ft) propellers. The boat was capable of operating at depths of up to 230 metres (750 ft).

The submarine had a maximum surface speed of 18.2 knots (33.7 km/h; 20.9 mph) and a maximum submerged speed of 7.3 knots (13.5 km/h; 8.4 mph). When submerged, the boat could operate for 64 nautical miles (119 km; 74 mi) at 4 knots (7.4 km/h; 4.6 mph); when surfaced, she could travel 12,000 nautical miles (22,000 km; 14,000 mi) at 10 knots (19 km/h; 12 mph). U-104 was fitted with six 53.3 cm (21 in) torpedo tubes (four fitted at the bow and two at the stern), 22 torpedoes, one 10.5 cm (4.13 in) SK C/32 naval gun, 180 rounds, and a 3.7 cm (1.5 in) SK C/30 as well as a 2 cm (0.79 in) C/30 anti-aircraft gun. The boat had a complement of forty-eight.

== Service history ==
During her short career, U-104 sank one enemy vessel and damaged another on her first and only war patrol in the North Sea, off the northern coast of Ireland and Great Britain. She went to sea on her first and only war patrol on 12 November 1940. For a period of 17 days, she roamed the North Sea and eventually the northern coast of Scotland and Ireland in search of any Allied convoys heading to Great Britain. During that time she attacked two enemy vessels, sinking one and damaging the other. On 27 November 1940, U-104 torpedoed and sank the British merchant vessel Diplomat, a straggler of convoy HX 88, with the loss of 14 of her crew. The other merchant vessel was the British motor tanker Charles F. Meyer, of convoy HX 87, which survived the attack. The next day, U-104 went missing just north of neutral Ireland. She is presumed to have been sunk by a mine from the SN 44 minefield, which was laid on 8 November 1940, just 20 days prior to U-104's disappearance. All of her crew are presumed dead.

== Summary of raiding history ==
Date	Ship	Nationality	Tonnage	Fate
27 November 1940	Charles F. Meyer	United Kingdom	10,516	Damaged
27 November 1940	Diplomat	United Kingdom	8,240	Sunk

== Bibliography ==
- Busch, Rainer; Röll, Hans-Joachim (1999). German U-boat commanders of World War II : a biographical dictionary. Translated by Brooks, Geoffrey. London, Annapolis, Md: Greenhill Books, Naval Institute Press. ISBN 1-55750-186-6.
- Busch, Rainer; Röll, Hans-Joachim (1999). Deutsche U-Boot-Verluste von September 1939 bis Mai 1945 [German U-boat losses from September 1939 to May 1945]. Der U-Boot-Krieg (in German). Vol. IV. Hamburg, Berlin, Bonn: Mittler. ISBN 3-8132-0514-2.
- Gröner, Erich; Jung, Dieter; Maass, Martin (1991). U-boats and Mine Warfare Vessels. German Warships 1815–1945. Vol. 2. Translated by Thomas, Keith; Magowan, Rachel. London: Conway Maritime Press. ISBN 0-85177-593-4.
