= German submarine U-65 (1939) =

German World War II submarine

Coordinates: 60°4′N 15°45′W

History

Nazi Germany
- Name: U-65
- Ordered: 16 July 1937
- Builder: AG Weser, Bremen
- Yard number: 953
- Laid down: 6 December 1938
- Launched: 6 November 1939
- Commissioned: 15 February 1940
- Fate: Sunk 28 April 1941.

General characteristics
- Class & type: Type IXB submarine
- Displacement: 1,051 t (1,034 long tons) surfaced; 1,178 t (1,159 long tons) submerged
- Length: 76.50 m (251 ft) o/a; 58.75 m (192 ft 9 in) pressure hull
- Beam: 6.76 m (22 ft 2 in) o/a; 4.40 m (14 ft 5 in) pressure hull
- Height: 9.60 m (31 ft 6 in)
- Draught: 4.70 m (15 ft 5 in)
- Speed: 18.2 knots (33.7 km/h; 20.9 mph) surfaced; 7.3 knots (13.5 km/h; 8.4 mph) submerged
- Range: 12,000 nmi (22,000 km; 14,000 mi) at 10 knots (19 km/h; 12 mph) surfaced; 64 nmi (119 km; 74 mi) at 4 knots (7.4 km/h; 4.6 mph) submerged
- Armament: 6 × torpedo tubes (4 bow, 2 stern); 22 × 53.3 cm (21 in) torpedoes; 1 × 10.5 cm (4.1 in) SK C/32 deck gun (180 rounds); 1 × 3.7 cm (1.5 in) SK C/30 AA gun; 1 × twin 2 cm FlaK 30 AA guns

Service record
- Part of: 2nd U-boat Flotilla; 15 February 1940 – 28 April 1941
- Identification codes: M 26 817
- Commanders: K.Kapt. Hans-Gerrit von Stockhausen; 15 February 1940 – 24 March 1941; Kptlt. Joachim Hoppe; 25 March – 28 April 1941
- Operations: 6 patrols: 1st patrol: 9 April – 14 May 1940; 2nd patrol: 8 June – 7 July 1940; 3rd patrol: a. 8–19 August 1940; b. 21 – 22 August 1940; 4th patrol: 28 August – 25 September 1940; 5th patrol: 15 October – 10 January 1941; 6th patrol: 12 – 28 April 1941
- Victories: 12 merchant ships sunk (66,174 GRT); 3 merchant ships damaged (22,490 GRT)

German submarine U-65 was a Type IXB U-boat of Nazi Germany's Kriegsmarine during World War II. Over the course of six war patrols between 9 April 1940 and 28 April 1941, she sank twelve ships and damaged three others for a total loss of 88,664 gross register tons (GRT).

== Construction and design ==
=== Construction ===
U-65 was ordered by the Kriegsmarine on 16 July 1937. Her keel was laid down on 6 December 1938 by AG Weser, Bremen as yard number 953. She was launched on 6 November 1939 and commissioned on 15 February 1940 under the command of Kapitänleutnant Hans-Gerrit von Stockhausen.

=== Design ===
Type IXB submarines were slightly larger than the original Type IX submarines, later designated IXA. U-65 had a displacement of 1,051 tonnes (1,034 long tons) when at the surface and 1,178 tonnes (1,159 long tons) while submerged. The U-boat had a total length of 76.50 m (251 ft), a pressure hull length of 58.75 m (192 ft 9 in), a beam of 6.76 m (22 ft 2 in), a height of 9.60 m (31 ft 6 in), and a draught of 4.70 m (15 ft 5 in). The submarine was powered by two MAN M 9 V 40/46 supercharged four-stroke, nine-cylinder diesel engines producing a total of 4,400 metric horsepower (3,240 kW; 4,340 shp) for use while surfaced, two Siemens-Schuckert 2 GU 345/34 double-acting electric motors producing a total of 1,000 metric horsepower (740 kW; 990 shp) for use while submerged. She had two shafts and two 1.92 m (6 ft) propellers. The boat was capable of operating at depths of up to 230 metres (750 ft).

The submarine had a maximum surface speed of 18.2 knots (33.7 km/h; 20.9 mph) and a maximum submerged speed of 7.3 knots (13.5 km/h; 8.4 mph). When submerged, the boat could operate for 64 nautical miles (119 km; 74 mi) at 4 knots (7.4 km/h; 4.6 mph); when surfaced, she could travel 12,000 nautical miles (22,000 km; 14,000 mi) at 10 knots (19 km/h; 12 mph). U-65 was fitted with six 53.3 cm (21 in) torpedo tubes (four fitted at the bow and two at the stern), 22 torpedoes, one 10.5 cm (4.13 in) SK C/32 naval gun, 180 rounds, and a 3.7 cm (1.5 in) SK C/30 as well as a 2 cm (0.79 in) C/30 anti-aircraft gun. The boat had a complement of forty-eight.

== Service history ==
=== First patrol ===
U-65's first war patrol began on 9 April 1940 when she left her home port of Wilhelmshaven. For 36 days she patrolled the North Sea and the waters off the coast of Norway, participating in the invasion of that country. During this time, she sank no enemy vessels. On 13 April, the U-boat attacked a group of British destroyers north of Bergen, Norway; but her torpedoes failed to detonate, the destroyers counter-attacked, causing some minor damage to the submarine. U-65 was able to escape the attack, she returned safely to Wilhelmshaven on 14 May.

=== Second patrol ===
U-65's second war patrol began on 8 June 1940. Over 30 days the boat crossed the North Sea, rounded the British Isles to the north and proceeded through the Celtic Sea to the Bay of Biscay. At 08:17 on 21 June, she encountered her first victim, the 1,177 GRT Dutch steam merchant ship Berenice, outbound from Bordeaux, carrying 1,000 tons of manganese ore and 22 passengers. A single torpedo hit her amidships and she sank in three minutes. Out of 47 souls aboard, only nine survivors were pulled from the water by a coastal vessel. One of these men, the ship's master, died of his wounds before the remaining complement was landed at Falmouth in Cornwall.

The following day, at 18:04, U-65 sank an unescorted tanker in the Bay of Biscay. This is believed to have been the 7,011 GRT French steam tanker Monique, although there were no survivors to confirm her identity. The only trace ever found of Monique was the body of one of her sailors, which washed ashore near A Coruña, Spain.

Near midday on 30 June, U-65 located and attacked convoy SL-36 and reported hits on two ships. In fact only one, the 5,802 GRT British steam merchantman Clan Ogilvy was hit. There were no casualties; the damaged ship was assisted by HMS Vesper and Gladiolus and arrived at Falmouth on 4 July.

One day later (1 July), the U-Boat attacked convoy OA-175. At 13:51 she fired her sole remaining torpedo at the Dutch steam merchant vessel Amstelland about 380 nmi (700 km; 440 mi) southwest of Lands End. The torpedo struck her on the starboard side; one crew member was blown overboard and drowned. Kptlt. Stockhausen claimed to have sunk his target, but despite being disabled Amstelland remained afloat for two days with a flooded Number 5 hold before being taken in tow by the rescue tug HMS Marauder. The Flower-class corvette Calendula escorted the tug and her charge to Falmouth, where they arrived on 5 July.

The last of her torpedoes expended, U-65 headed for home. This successful patrol was terminated at Wilhelmshaven on 7 July.

=== Third patrol ===
Departing Wilhelmshaven on 8 August 1940, U-65 proceeded into the North Sea and around the British Isles on her way to her new base at the recently captured Lorient, in France. The journey took twelve days. This patrol was unfruitful however, the submarine arrived at Lorient on 19 August without scoring any kills. U-65 carried on this patrol IRA Chief of Staff Seán Russell and Frank Ryan an IRA man who had fought on the Republican side in the Spanish Civil War and was captured by Franco forces and handed over to the Abwehr. The aim of this Abwehr-sanctioned mission, titled Operation Dove ("Unternehmen Taube" in German), was sabotage following transport to Ireland. Russell became ill during the journey and complained of stomach pains. U-65 was not equipped with a doctor and he died on 14 August, 100 miles short of Galway. He was buried at sea and the mission aborted. Following the return of the submarine to Germany an inquiry was set up into Russell's death by the Abwehr. This inquiry included the interrogation of U-65's crew and Frank Ryan. The conclusion drawn was that Russell had suffered a burst gastric ulcer and without medical attention he had died.

=== Fourth patrol ===
U-65 stood out of Lorient on 21 August 1940 for her fourth patrol. After a stop of about six days at Brest, the North Atlantic patrol began in earnest. No targets were sighted until 20:00 on 14 September, when convoy HX 70 was located about 180 nmi (330 km; 210 mi) off Barra Head (in Scotland).

At 21:18, a torpedo was fired but missed ahead of the Norwegian MV Hird's bow. Reacting to the attack, the merchantman began zigzagging at full speed, trying to escape. Due to the evasive course, it took nine hours to reach a new firing position, but at 06:05 a single torpedo fired from U-65's stern tube struck the merchant vessel on the starboard side between the bridge and the foremast. As the ship developed a heavy list, the crew abandoned their vessel in one lifeboat and a gig, signalling a nearby trawler to pick them up. The Germans observed the crew being rescued and the Hird sinking at 20:30. The trawler, the Icelandic Þórólfur (English: Thorolf), landed the survivors at Fleetwood on England's west coast on 17 September.

A second successful attack occurred on 17 September 1940, when the boat torpedoed the British steam merchant ship Treganna which had been travelling with convoy HX 71. A single torpedo hit sent her to the bottom 78 nmi (144 km; 90 mi) northwest of Rockall in a matter of seconds; of her 37 crew, only four survived. They were picked up by the British merchantman Filleigh from the same convoy, and landed at Avonmouth.

Another twelve days at sea provided no additional targets; U-65 returned to Lorient on 25 September.

=== Fifth patrol ===
Several weeks later, on 15 October, U-65 sortied from Lorient, bound for the west coast of Africa and the South Atlantic. This would become both her longest and most successful patrol. A full month at sea passed before the submarine spotted her first target, the 5,168 GRT British steam merchant vessel Kohinur; recently separated from convoy OB 235. At 15:11, U-65 attacked and sank her about 250 nmi (460 km; 290 mi) north of the Equator. Initially, 68 of 85 men aboard survived, however many of them were killed a few hours later when U-65 sank her second victim of the patrol, the 7,614 GRT Norwegian motor tanker Havbør.

British sailors on a raft from Kohinur had warned Havbør that a submarine was in the area, but boats were lowered to assist the 31 survivors anyhow. While this operation was in progress, Havbør was hit on the port side by a single torpedo from U-65 and immediately caught fire, burning oil spread over the surface of the water and engulfed many of the boats involved in the rescue operation. 28 members of Havbør's crew (including the ship's master) and all 31 men from Kohinur perished in the flames. The tanker sank seven hours later. Of the five survivors, one died of his wounds before rescue finally arrived on 24 November. The four remaining men were landed at Freetown in Sierra Leone.

On 16 November, the submarine found her next mark in the 3,059 GRT British steam merchant ship Fabian about 350 nmi (650 km; 400 mi) west of Freetown. A single torpedo at 14:29 hit her in the foreship. The U-Boat surfaced and finished off the stricken freighter with five hits out of eight rounds from the deck gun and she sank with the loss of six men. The 33 survivors were questioned by the Germans, who treated two injured men and provided food and water before departing the scene.

At 18:02 on 18 November, U-65 sighted the unescorted British motor tanker Congonian. The first torpedo hit the tanker's engine compartment. A coup de grâce followed at 18:12, hitting her near the stern. One man was lost, the remaining 35 crew members were picked up by the British cruiser HMS Devonshire and landed at Freetown a few days later (29 November).

U-65 became the first U-Boat to cross the Equator on 11 December 1940.

After the sinking of Congonian, more than a month passed before U-65 encountered her next victim. At 16:05 on 21 December, the unescorted (neutral) Panamanian steam tanker Charles Pratt was hit amidships by a single torpedo. Although Stockhausen noted that the neutral flags painted on her sides were clearly visible, he decided to attack without warning as it was clear (based on her position and heading) that she was bound for an enemy port. The tanker's fire suppression system was damaged in the attack, the crew abandoned their vessel in two portside lifeboats. A second torpedo hit on the starboard side just forward of the midship house about 20 minutes later, showering the surrounding water with debris, some of which barely missed the lifeboats. Although this second attack extinguished the fire, the flooding was too much and the ship sank with a heavy list. The survivors were picked up a few days later by the British merchantmen Gascony and Langleegorse and landed at Freetown.

On Christmas Eve U-65 encountered the steam tanker British Premier, a straggler from convoy SLS-60. Two torpedoes sealed her fate at 16:41; she was sunk about 200 nmi (370 km; 230 mi) southwest of Freetown. The ship's master, thirty crew and a gunner were lost in the sinking. Of the thirteen survivors, nine were picked up on 3 January 1941 by HMS Hawkins and landed at Freetown. The other four drifted in an open boat for 41 days (25 of those without food) before being rescued by HMS Faulknor.

Three days later, the unescorted Norwegian steam merchant vessel Risanger (5,455 GRT) was sighted. At 11:31 a single torpedo fired from U-65's stern hit her amidships. U-65 surfaced and fired 70 rounds from the deck gun to finish off the merchant ship, which sank with her screw still turning. All 29 men aboard abandoned ship and were picked up a few days later by the Norwegian motor tanker Belinda. They were landed at Cape Town, South Africa on 10 January 1941.

On 31 December, U-65 sighted the 8,532 GRT motor tanker British Zeal traveling on a non-evasive course at 10.5 knots east of the Cape Verde Islands. The submarine fired two torpedoes at 17:52, one of which became hot in the tube and had to be launched manually; both of these shots missed. At 23:00 a lookout spotted another torpedo track and the helm was thrown hard to starboard, but the torpedo struck the tanker squarely on the starboard side under the bridge, rupturing Number 2 tank. Despite rough seas, the crew took to the lifeboats immediately. A first coup de grâce missed, due to a malfunction, but a second struck the starboard side at the bulkhead between Numbers 3 and 4 tanks about 30 minutes after the first hit. The darkness and adverse weather prevented use of the deck gun, but having observed the crew abandoning ship the submarine departed the area, assuming the tanker would sink.

At first light, the tanker's crew spotted their still floating ship and re-boarded her. Despite three flooded tanks, two large holes in the starboard side, and a deck torn open by the explosions the engine room was found to be intact. The crew raised steam and tested the engines and steering, but then abandoned the ship again, fearing the submarine was still nearby. At dawn the next day, the crew re-boarded the vessel a second time, raised steam and headed toward Bathurst at five knots. A few hours later the British destroyer HMS Encounter arrived, offered assistance, and then left to search for the long-departed attacker. The damaged tanker continued alone until joined by the rescue tug HMS Hudson on 4 January. Despite heavy damage and inclement weather, British Zeal made harbour at Freetown on 8 January. She left the port after temporary repairs for more permanent restoration in Baltimore. The ship returned to service in February 1942.

A final kill was added to the submarine's tally on 2 January 1941. At 22:07 a single torpedo from U-65 struck the British steam merchant ship Nalgora (6,579 GRT) about 350 nmi (650 km; 400 mi) north of the Cape Verde Islands. About 20 minutes later, the U-Boat surfaced and finished off the stricken vessel with the deck gun. All 105 souls aboard the merchantman survived. 86 were picked up by the British merchant ships Nolisement and Umgeni after eight days adrift. The remaining 19 reached land in the Cape Verde Islands.

After months at sea, U-65 returned to the U-Boat pens at Lorient on 10 January 1941. In honor of this highly successful patrol, Stockhausen was promoted to Korvettenkapitän and awarded the Knight's Cross of the Iron Cross. He left the boat at this time and assumed command of the newly formed 26th U-boat Flotilla.

=== Sixth patrol and loss ===
After a much needed break from life at sea, U-65 sortied again from Lorient on 12 April 1941. Under the command of Kptlt. Joachim Hoppe, she made for the North Atlantic where, on 28 April she was attacked and sunk by depth charges from the British destroyer HMS Douglas.

50 men died with the U-boat; there were no survivors.

== Summary of raiding history ==
Date	Ship	Nationality	Tonnage	Fate
21 June 1940	Berenice	Netherlands	1,177	Sunk
22 June 1940	Monique	France	7,011	Sunk
30 June 1940	Clan Ogilvy	United Kingdom	5,802	Damaged
1 July 1940	Amstelland	Netherlands	8,156	Damaged
15 September 1940	Hird	Norway	4,950	Sunk
17 September 1940	Tregenna	United Kingdom	5,242	Sunk
15 November 1940	Havbør	Norway	7,614	Sunk
15 November 1940	Kohinur	United Kingdom	5,168	Sunk
16 November 1940	Fabian	United Kingdom	3,059	Sunk
18 November 1940	Congonian	United Kingdom	5,065	Sunk
21 December 1940	Charles Pratt	Panama	8,982	Sunk
24 December 1940	British Premier	United Kingdom	5,872	Sunk
27 December 1940	Risanger	Norway	5,455	Sunk
31 December 1940	British Zeal	United Kingdom	8,532	Damaged
2 January 1941	Nalgora	United Kingdom	6,579	Sunk

== Bibliography ==
- Busch, Rainer; Röll, Hans-Joachim (1999). German U-boat commanders of World War II : a biographical dictionary. Translated by Brooks, Geoffrey. London, Annapolis, Md: Greenhill Books, Naval Institute Press. ISBN 1-55750-186-6.
- Busch, Rainer; Röll, Hans-Joachim (1999). Der U-Boot-Krieg, 1939-1945: Deutsche U-Boot-Verluste von September 1939 bis Mai 1945 [German U-boat losses from September 1939 to May 1945] (in German). Vol. IV. Hamburg, Berlin, Bonn: Mittler. ISBN 3-8132-0514-2.
- Edwards, Bernard (1996). Dönitz and the Wolf Packs - The U-boats at War. Cassell Military Classics. pp. 22, 27, 29. ISBN 0-304-35203-9.
- Gröner, Eric; Jung, Dieter; Maass, Martin (1991). German Warships 1815-1945: U-boats and Mine Warfare Vessels. Vol. 2. Translated by Thomas, Keith; Magowan, Rachel. London: Conway Maritime Press. ISBN 0-85177-593-4.
