= German submarine U-137 (1940) =

German World War II submarine

History

Nazi Germany
- Name: U-137
- Ordered: 25 September 1939
- Builder: Deutsche Werke, Kiel
- Yard number: 266
- Laid down: 16 November 1939
- Launched: 18 May 1940
- Commissioned: 15 June 1940
- Fate: Scuttled on 5 May 1945 at Wilhelmshaven

General characteristics
- Class & type: Type IID coastal submarine
- Displacement: 314 t (309 long tons) surfaced; 364 t (358 long tons) submerged
- Length: 43.97 m (144 ft 3 in) o/a; 29.80 m (97 ft 9 in) pressure hull
- Beam: 4.92 m (16 ft 2 in) (o/a); 4.00 m (13 ft 1 in) (pressure hull)
- Height: 8.40 m (27 ft 7 in)
- Draught: 3.93 m (12 ft 11 in)
- Installed power: 700 PS (510 kW; 690 bhp) (diesels); 410 PS (300 kW; 400 shp) (electric)
- Propulsion: 2 shafts; 2 × diesel engines; 2 × electric motors
- Speed: 12.7 knots (23.5 km/h; 14.6 mph) surfaced; 7.4 knots (13.7 km/h; 8.5 mph) submerged
- Range: 3,450 nmi (6,390 km; 3,970 mi) at 12 knots (22 km/h; 14 mph) surfaced; 56 nmi (104 km; 64 mi) at 4 knots (7.4 km/h; 4.6 mph) submerged
- Test depth: 80 m (260 ft)
- Complement: 3 officers, 22 men
- Armament: 3 × 53.3 cm (21 in) torpedo tubes; 5 × torpedoes or up to 12 TMA or 18 TMB mines; 1 × 2 cm (0.79 in) C/30 anti-aircraft gun

Service record
- Part of: 1st U-boat Flotilla; 15 June – 19 December 1940; 22nd U-boat Flotilla; 20 December 1940 – 5 May 1945
- Identification codes: M 02 030
- Commanders: Oblt.z.S. / Kptlt. Herbert Wohlfarth; 15 June – 14 December 1940; Oblt.z.S. Hans-Ferdinand Massmann; 15 December 1940 – 7 December 1941; Oblt.z.S. Herbert Brüning; 8 December 1941 – 1 September 1942; Oblt.z.S. Gerth Gemeiner; 2 September 1942 – 27 December 1943; Oblt.z.S. Günther Schimmel; 28 December 1943 – 24 January 1945; Oblt.z.S. Erich Fischer; 25 January – 28 February 1945; Oblt.z.S. Hans-Joachim Dierks; March – 5 May 1945
- Operations: 4 patrols: 1st patrol: 21 – 29 September 1940; 2nd patrol: 9 – 17 October 1940; 3rd patrol: a. 3 – 22 November 1940; b. 24 – 27 November 1940; c. 17 – 20 June 1941; 4th patrol: a. 21 June - 4 July 1941; b. 24–26 July 1941; c. 28–29 August 1941
- Victories: 6 merchant ships sunk (24,136 GRT); 1 merchant ship damaged (4,917 GRT); 1 auxiliary warship damaged (10,552 GRT)

German submarine U-137 was a Type IID U-boat of Nazi Germany's Kriegsmarine in World War II. Her keel was laid down on 16 November 1939 by Deutsche Werke in Kiel. She was launched on 18 May 1940 and commissioned on 15 June 1940 with Oberleutnant zur See Herbert Wohlfarth in command.

U-137 conducted four patrols, sinking six ships totaling 24,136 gross registered tons (GRT) and damaged one vessel of 4,917 GRT. She also damaged one auxiliary warship of 10,552 GRT. She was scuttled on 5 May 1945 at Wilhelmshaven, a week before Germany's surrender. U-137 never suffered any casualties to her crew.

== Design ==
German Type IID submarines were enlarged versions of the original Type IIs. U-137 had a displacement of 314 tonnes (309 long tons) when at the surface and 364 tonnes (358 long tons) while submerged. Officially, the standard tonnage was 250 long tons (254 t), however. The U-boat had a total length of 43.97 m (144 ft 3 in), a pressure hull length of 29.80 m (97 ft 9 in), a beam of 4.92 m (16 ft 2 in), a height of 8.40 m (27 ft 7 in), and a draught of 3.93 m (12 ft 11 in). The submarine was powered by two MWM RS 127 S four-stroke, six-cylinder diesel engines of 700 metric horsepower (510 kW; 690 shp) for cruising, two Siemens-Schuckert PG VV 322/36 double-acting electric motors producing a total of 410 metric horsepower (300 kW; 400 shp) for use while submerged. She had two shafts and two 0.85 m (3 ft) propellers. The boat was capable of operating at depths of up to 80–150 metres (260–490 ft).

The submarine had a maximum surface speed of 12.7 knots (23.5 km/h; 14.6 mph) and a maximum submerged speed of 7.4 knots (13.7 km/h; 8.5 mph). When submerged, the boat could operate for 35–42 nautical miles (65–78 km; 40–48 mi) at 4 knots (7.4 km/h; 4.6 mph); when surfaced, she could travel 3,800 nautical miles (7,000 km; 4,400 mi) at 8 knots (15 km/h; 9.2 mph). U-137 was fitted with three 53.3 cm (21 in) torpedo tubes at the bow, five torpedoes or up to twelve Type A torpedo mines, and a 2 cm (0.79 in) anti-aircraft gun. The boat had a complement of 25.

== Operational career ==
=== First patrol ===
U-137 made the short journey from Kiel to Stavanger in Norway in September 1940. It was from the Nordic port that she began her first patrol on the 21st. Her route took her through the gap between the Faroe and Shetland Islands and on in to the Atlantic west of Scotland and Ireland.

She sank Manchester Brigade west of Malin Head on the 26th and damaged Ashantian on the same date. The ship had been abandoned by her crew; the master and eight crew-members had returned to the vessel where the master was scandalized to see that the ship had been looted following the presence of a boarding party from the armed trawler HMS Wolves. Ashantian was repaired and returned to service in September 1941. She was sunk in April 1943.

Continuing her success, the U-boat sank Stratford, in the same general area as her other victims, also on the 26th.

U-137 arrived at Lorient on the French Atlantic coast, on 29 September.

=== Second patrol ===
U-137 torpedoed the British Armed Merchant Cruiser HMS Cheshire northwest of Ireland on 14 October 1940. The Cheshire did not sink, and was towed to Belfast Lough, then moved to Liverpool for repairs that took six months.

Having set off from Lorient on 9 October, U-137 returned there on the 17th.

=== Third patrol ===
Sortie number three commenced with U-137's departure from Lorient on 3 November 1940 and returning to her old hunting grounds west of Scotland and north of Ireland. Her run of victories continued, sinking Cape St. Andrew west north-west of Aran Island on the 13th; Planter on the 16th north north-west of Bloody Foreland and two ships on the same day, from the same convoy (HG 46), Veronica and Saint Germain north north-west of Tory Island on 17 November.

The submarine steamed to Norway, again round the British Isles, docking in Bergen, on 22 November.

=== Fourth patrol ===
The boat's last operational patrol was to the north of the Shetland Islands, but she did not attack any targets. She then moved from Bergen to Helsingör in Denmark and on to Kiel, arriving there on 29 August 1941.

=== Fate ===
U-137 became a 'school' (or training) boat in December 1940, a position she would hold for the rest of the war. She was one of many that were scuttled in Raederschleuse (a lock named after the Grand Admiral), in Wilhelmshaven, on 5 May 1945. The wreck was broken up, although the post-war date is unknown.

== Summary of raiding history ==
Date	Ship Name	Nationality	Tonnage (Note: Merchant ship tonnages are in gross register tons. Military vessels are listed by tons displacement.)	Fate	Convoy	Position	Deaths
26 September 1940	Ashantian	United Kingdom	4,917	Damaged	OB 218	55°10′N 11°00′W	4
26 September 1940	Manchester Brigade	United Kingdom	6,042	Sunk	OB 218	54°53′N 10°22′W	56
26 September 1940	Stratford	United Kingdom	4,753	Sunk	OB 218	54°50′N 10°40′W	2
14 October 1940	HMS Cheshire	Royal Navy	10,552	Damaged		55°13′N 13°02′W	0
13 November 1940	Cape St. Andrew	United Kingdom	5,094	Sunk	Straggler	55°14′N 10°29′W	15
16 November 1940	Planter	United Kingdom	5,887	Sunk	Sailing alone	55°38′N 08°28′W	13
17 November 1940	Saint Germain	United Kingdom	1,044	Sunk	HG 46	55°40′N 08°40′W	0
17 November 1940	Veronica	Sweden	1,316	Sunk	HG 46	55°20′N 08°45′W	17

== Bibliography ==
- Busch, Rainer; Röll, Hans-Joachim (1999). German U-boat commanders of World War II: a biographical dictionary. Translated by Brooks, Geoffrey. London, Annapolis, Md: Greenhill Books, Naval Institute Press. ISBN 1-55750-186-6.
- Busch, Rainer; Röll, Hans-Joachim (1999). Der U-Boot-Krieg, 1939-1945: Deutsche U-Boot-Verluste von September 1939 bis Mai 1945 [The U-Boat War, 1939-1945: German U-boat losses from September 1939 to May 1945] (in German). Vol. IV. Hamburg, Berlin, Bonn: Mittler. ISBN 3-8132-0514-2.
- Gröner, Erich; Jung, Dieter; Maass, Martin (1991). "U-boats and Mine Warfare Vessels". German Warships 1815–1945. Vol. 2. Translated by Thomas, Keith; Magowan, Rachel. London: Conway Maritime Press. ISBN 0-85177-593-4.
