= SS British Premier =

Tanker sunk during World War II

Coordinates: 6°20′N 13°20′W

History

United Kingdom
- Name: British Premier
- Operator: British Tanker Co. Ltd., London
- Builder: Palmers Shipbuilding and Iron Company, Jarrow and Hebburn-on-Tyne
- Yard number: 925
- Launched: 25 August 1922
- Completed: 1922
- Fate: Sunk on 24 December 1940

General characteristics
- Tonnage: 5,872 GRT
- Length: 400 ft 7 in (122.10 m) o/a
- Beam: 53 ft 10 in (16.41 m)
- Draught: 32 ft 9 in (9.98 m)
- Propulsion: 2 steam turbines, single screw
- Speed: 10 knots (19 km/h; 12 mph)
- Capacity: 8,000 tons of crude oil
- Crew: 45

SS British Premier was a tanker built by Palmers Shipbuilding and Iron Company in 1922, registered in London and operated by the British Tanker Company.

During the Second World War, she was used on convoy duties to bring oil from the Persian Gulf around the Cape of Good Hope and to the United Kingdom. She was part of Convoy SLS 60 in late December 1940, but was straggling behind the main group when she came under attack by a German U-boat and was sunk with heavy loss of life.

Her final convoy was to have taken her from Abadan to Swansea, via Freetown, which she reached on 22 December. Two days later she was still straggling, when she was spotted by U-65, commanded by Hans-Gerrit von Stockhausen. At 16:41, U-65 torpedoed and sank British Premier. She went down with the loss of 32 of her crew. There were thirteen survivors, nine of whom were later picked up by the cruiser HMS Hawkins on 3 January 1941 and taken to Freetown. The remaining four were not picked up until 3 February, when they were rescued by the destroyer HMS Faulknor, having spent 41 days in an open boat, 25 of those days without any food.
