= 1940 Armistice Day Blizzard =

Storm in the midwestern United States

Armistice Day Blizzard
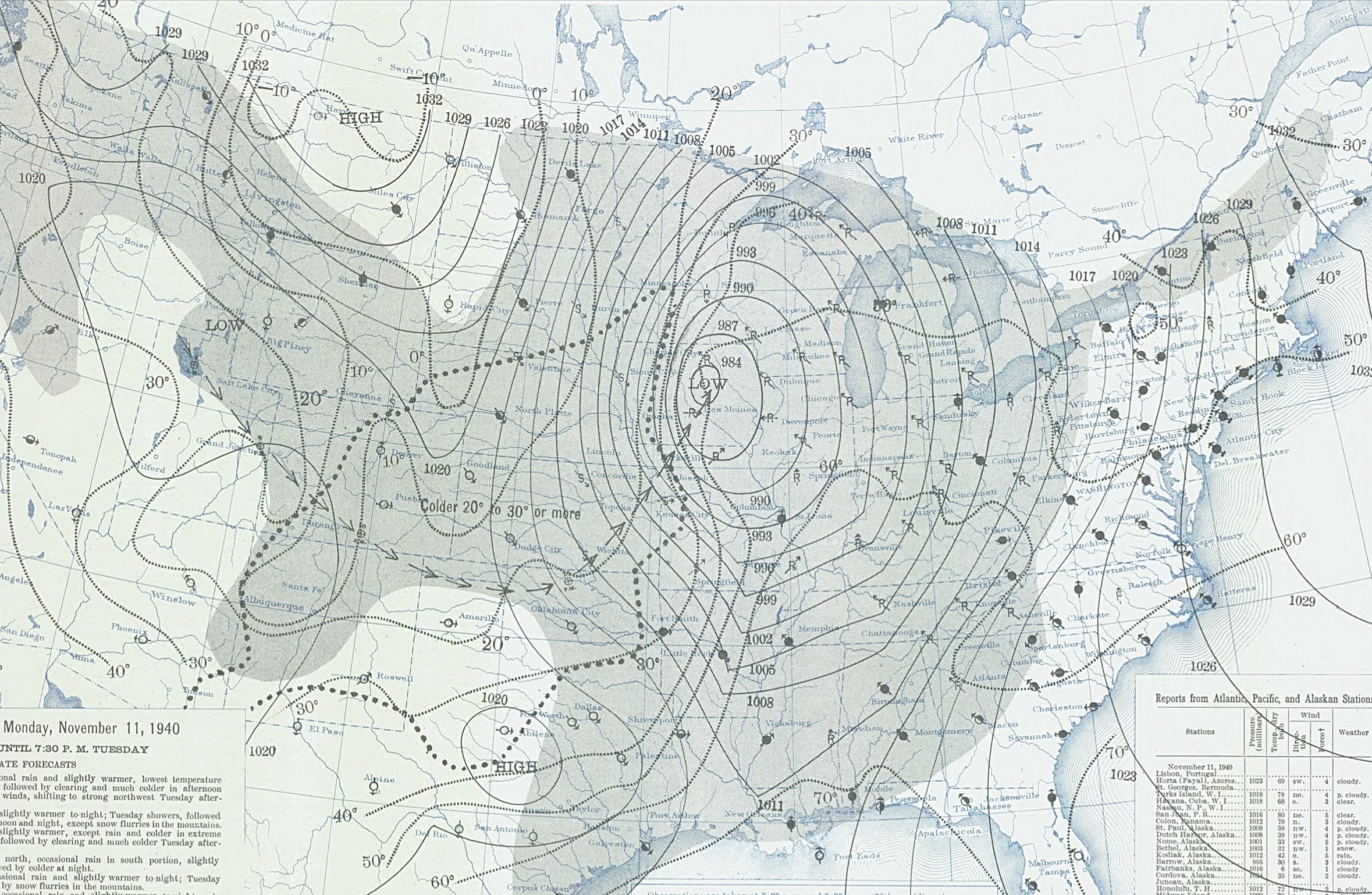
- Weather map of the storm over the Midwestern United States on November 11

Meteorological history
- Formed: November 10, 1940
- Dissipated: November 12, 1940

Blizzard
- Lowest pressure: 971 hPa (mbar); 28.67 inHg
- Max. snowfall: 27 inches (69 cm) (Collegeville, MN)

Overall effects
- Fatalities: 154
- Damage: $2.2 million (1940)
- Areas affected: Midwestern United States

Armistice Day Storm Informational Designation
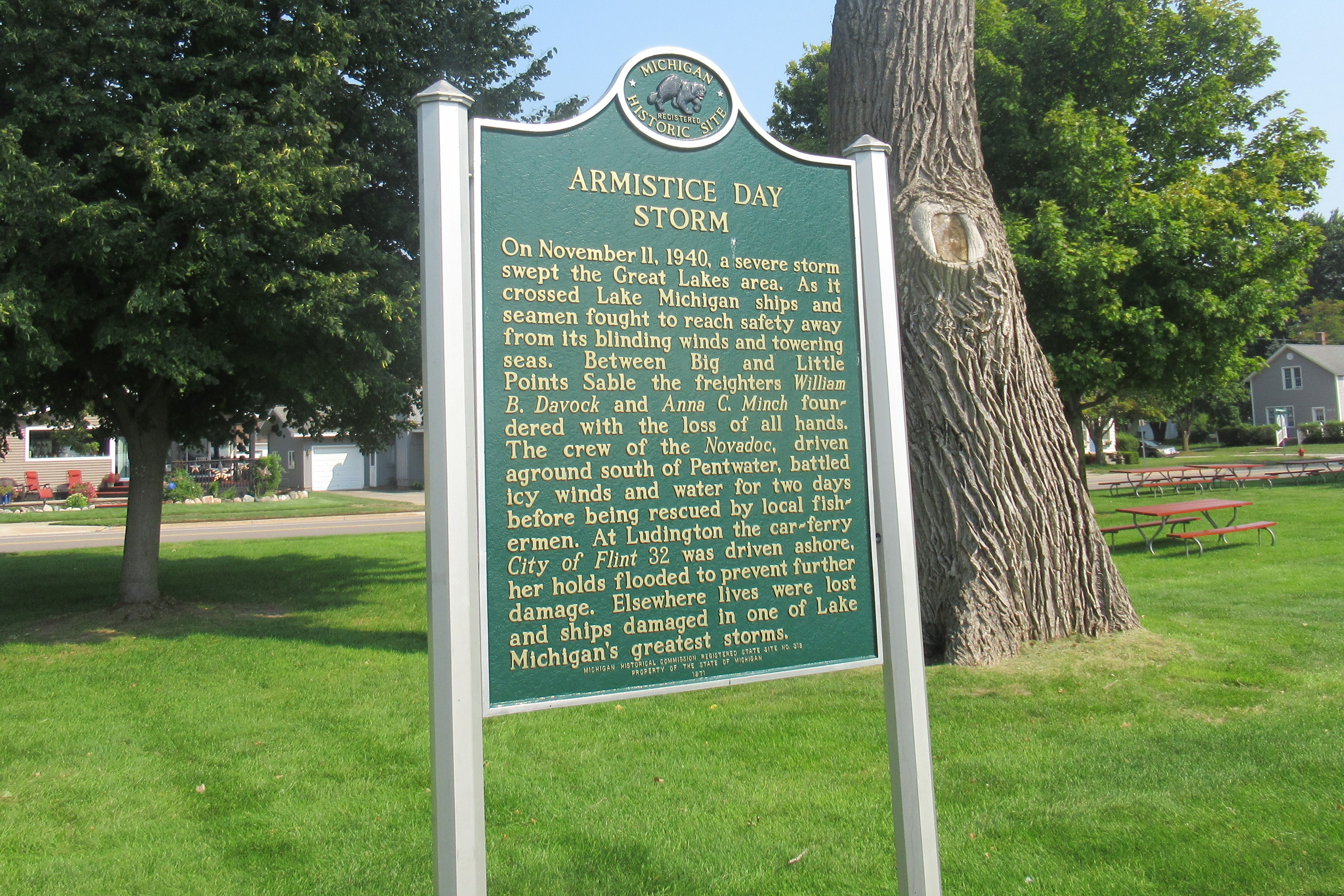
- Interactive map of Armistice Day Storm; Informational Designation
- 43°57′29″N 86°27′35″W
- Location: Stearns Park Beach along North Lakeshore Drive (M-116); Ludington, Michigan

Michigan State Historic Site
- Designated: November 6, 1970

The Armistice Day Blizzard (or the Armistice Day Storm) took place in the Midwest region of the United States on November 11 (Armistice Day) and November 12, 1940. The intense early-season "panhandle hook" winter storm cut a 1,000-mile-wide (1,600-kilometer) swath through the middle of the country from Kansas to Michigan.

== Meteorological synopsis ==
On November 7, 1940, the low pressure system that later developed into the storm was affecting the Pacific Northwest and produced the 40 mph (64 km/h) winds that destroyed the Tacoma Narrows Bridge. On November 10, the fast-moving storm crossed the Rocky Mountains in just two hours on its way to the Midwest.

The morning of November 11, 1940, brought with it unseasonably high temperatures in the Upper Midwest. By early afternoon, temperatures approached 65 °F (18 °C) over most of the affected region. However, as the day wore on conditions quickly deteriorated. Severe weather was reported across much of the Midwest with heavy rain and snow, a tornado, and gale-force winds were all reported. Temperatures dropped sharply, winds picked up and rain, followed by sleet and then snow, began to fall. An intense low pressure system tracked from the southern plains northeastward into western Wisconsin, pulling Gulf of Mexico moisture up from the South and pulling down a cold arctic air mass from the North.

The result was a raging blizzard that would last into the next day. Snowfalls of up to 27 inches (69 cm), winds of 50 to 80 miles per hour (80 to 130 km/h), 20-foot (6.1 m) snow drifts, and 50 °F (28 °C) temperature drops were common over parts of the states of Nebraska, South Dakota, Iowa, Minnesota, Wisconsin, and Michigan. In Minnesota, 27 in (69 cm) of snow fell at Collegeville, and the Twin Cities recorded 16 in (41 cm). Record low pressures were recorded in La Crosse, Wisconsin, and Duluth, Minnesota. Transportation and communications were crippled, which made finding the dead and injured more difficult. The Armistice Day Blizzard ranks #2 in Minnesota's list of the top five weather events of the 20th century.

Survivors describe the cold as so severe that it was difficult to breathe, with the air so moisture-laden it was thick like syrup and that the cold seared the survivors' lungs like a red-hot blade. Many individuals claim that animals were aware of the upcoming weather shifts, which led to animals moving rapidly from the area. Duck hunters who were out at the time were amazed at the number of ducks that were in the area and on the move through the skies; one survivor recounted that there were thousands. Future Minnesota Vikings coach Bud Grant was caught in this storm while duck hunting with two friends. Grant and his friends were nearly unable to find shelter until Grant was able to hear a train horn and followed the sound's direction to discover railroad tracks, then was able to find shelter at a nearby gas station and ride out the blizzard.

== Casualties ==
A total of 146 deaths were blamed on the storm, with the following instances being noteworthy:

- Along the Mississippi River several hundred duck hunters had taken time off from work and school to take advantage of the ideal hunting conditions. Weather forecasters had not predicted the severity of the oncoming storm, and as a result many of the hunters were not dressed for cold weather. When the storm began many hunters took shelter on small islands in the Mississippi River, and the 50 mph (80 km/h) winds and 5-foot (1.5 m) waves overcame their encampments. Some became stranded on the islands and then froze to death as temperatures went below 10 °F (−12 °C) overnight. Others tried to make it to shore and drowned. Duck hunters constituted about half of the 49 deaths in Minnesota. Those who survived told of how ducks came south with the storm by the thousands, and everybody could have shot their daily limit had they not been focused on survival.
- Casualties were lessened by the efforts of Max Conrad, a pioneering light plane pilot and flight school owner, and John R. "Bob" Bean (one of the flight school instructors), both based in Winona, Minnesota. They flew up and down the river in the wake of the storm, locating survivors and dropping supplies to them. Both men were nominated for the Carnegie Medal for their heroism.
- One survivor, Gerald Tarras, survived the storm in Minneapolis due to the two family Labrador Retriever dogs who lay beside him and provided body heat to protect him.
- In Watkins, Minnesota, 2 people died when a passenger train and a freight train collided in the blinding snow. Watkins residents formed a human chain to lead the passengers to safety.
- On Lake Michigan, 66 sailors died in the sinking of three freighters, the SS Anna C. Minch, the SS Novadoc, and the SS William B. Davock, and two smaller boats.
- 13 people died in Illinois, 13 in Wisconsin, and 4 in Michigan.

Additionally, 1.5 million turkeys intended for Thanksgiving dinners across Minnesota perished from exposure to the cold conditions.

== Aftermath ==
Prior to this event, all of the weather forecasts for the region originated in Chicago. After the failure to provide an accurate forecast for this blizzard, forecasting responsibilities were expanded to include 24-hour coverage and more forecasting offices were created, yielding more accurate local forecasts.

The U.S. Weather Bureau was criticized that it failed to predict the huge blizzard and officials released a statement that they were aware that the storm was coming but wrong about its strength and scope. The Twin Cities (Minneapolis/St. Paul) branch of Meteorology was upgraded to issue forecasts and not rely on the Chicago site.

== See also ==
- Climate of Minnesota
- Great Lakes Storm of 1913
- Great Storms of the North American Great Lakes
- Mataafa Storm
- Collapse of the first Tacoma Narrows Bridge, an infamous bridge collapse caused by the same low pressure system several days prior
