= SS Trebartha =

Cargo carrying steamship built in 1920

History

United Kingdom
- Name: Trebartha
- Namesake: Trebartha Hall
- Owner: Hain Steamship Company
- Operator: Hain Steamship Company
- Builder: John Readhead and Sons Ltd
- Yard number: 463
- Launched: 31 August 1920
- Completed: December 1920
- In service: December 1920
- Out of service: 12 November 1940

General characteristics
- Type: Cargo ship
- Tonnage: 4,597 GRT
- Length: 400 ft (120 m) lbp; 414 ft (126 m) loa
- Beam: 52 ft (16 m)
- Depth: 28 ft 6 in (8.69 m)
- Decks: 2
- Installed power: Steam engine
- Propulsion: Screw propeller

SS Trebartha was a 4,597 GRT cargo carrying steamship built in 1920 by John Readhead & Sons Ltd of South Shields for the Hain Steamship Company. She was attacked by German aircraft on 11 November and sank on 12 November 1940.

== Building ==
Named after Trebartha Hall; a photograph of her namesake was hung in the ship’s smokeroom.

== Sister ships ==
Trebartha's sister ships were SS Trevorian and SS Tredinnick, J. Readhead & Sons yard numbers 462 and 464 respectively. Trevorian sank in the North Sea on 29 November 1943 after a collision with the Icelandic trawler Oli Garda. Tredinnick was torpedoed of 25 or 29 March 1942 (sources conflict as to the date) by the Italian submarine Pietro Calvi on passage from New York to Table Bay and lost with all hands.

== Cargo ship career ==
After conducting her sea trials off the River Tyne Trebartha departed Avonmouth on 24 December 1920 for Liverpool and sailed on 1 Jan 1921 for Fremantle; Adelaide; Melbourne; Sydney; and Brisbane under the command of Captain J.H. Pelham.

A letter published in The Fremantle Times Feb 1921 from the Second Officer S.G. Roach reported a ship’s cricket team had been formed by the officers and cadets and would be pleased to play local amateur teams when the ship reached Australia – providing the local teams could provide the bats.

Trebartha arrived in Fremantle at 1240 p.m 17 February 1921 before then calling at Adelaide, Melbourne and Sydney on the 2, 7, and 14 March. Whilst in Sydney the apprentice Samuel Hills, aged 16, was overcome by fumigating gas when removing hatch covers and fell 40 ft into No. 2 Hold.

Trebartha sailed from Sydney 24 March with a cargo of 97,608 bags of wheat for the State Wheat Board. After bunkering at Fremantle and passing through the Suez Canal she finished her maiden voyage by arriving in London on 24 May 1921.

On Saturday 29 April 1922 a cricket match was played between the officers of the Trebartha and the Port Pirie YMCA, and in November 1923 another match was played in Port Pirie against High School for a score of 123 runs to 134.

She is recorded as having departed from an unknown port of New Guinea 6 September 1924 with a cargo of 1,911 tons of copra valued at £37,503.

On 5 May 1925, on return from Australia with a cargo of 3058 tons of Port Pirie loaded loose lead concentrates for Antwerp via Rabaul, Kaeweing, Madang, Marseilles and Hull Trebartha stranded on a reef near Nasalomon Island and was refloated in the early hours of 8 May after unloading 500 tons of copra cargo. After proceeding to Rabaul for examination she was declared sea-worthy and continued her voyage. She was under the command of Captain J. Symonds.

She was laid up in the River Fal 16 March 1930 to 27 November 1931.

During the winter of 1934-1935 she was trapped in ice in the harbour of Vladivostok for nearly a month, Captain T. H. Stanbury telling The Sydney Morning Herald on 22 February that the Chief Officer E.A. Jenkins was almost lost falling through thin ice as he inspected the propeller.

In December 1938 poor weather in the Pacific Ocean on her way from Townsville to St. John’s diminished her usual stores, Captain Barrett then deciding to make a diversion to Pearl Harbor where she was bunkered with 200 tons of coal from US Naval stores.

On 28 April 1939 the top 20 ft of her after-mast snapped whilst unloading cargo at Woolloomooloo, with the entire mast being replaced in Melbourne.

On 19 January 1940 the Trebartha was involved in a collision with S.S. Cymbeline in Suez Bay which considerably damaged her stem and port bow. Repairs were carried out in Newcastle in March. Trebartha was later found by the British Admiralty Court to be three quarters to blame for the collision.

== Wartime convoys ==
The Trebartha was an active ship: the following are her movements for 1940 and her known convoys.

- Sd. Columbo 31/12 for Suez arr. 15/1/1940. In Suez Rds 17/1. Collision on 19/01. Sd. Port Said for Gibraltar arr. 07/02.
- Convoy HG 18 Gibraltar 9/2/40 for London arr. 19/2.
- Sd. for Tyne 28/02 Anch. Southend 29/02
- Convoy FN 9 Southend 2/03/40 for Tyne arr. 4/03/40
- Repairs at Newcastle upon Tyne 07/03/1940
- Convoy FS 44 Tyne 12/04 arr. Southend 14/4
- Convoy OA 13OG Sd. Southend 16/4 passed Dover 16/4 to form Convoy OG 26 Arr. Gibraltar 25/4
- Sd. Gibraltar 28/4 for Algiers arr. 30/4 Sd. Algiers 4/5 for Bône Arr. 4/5. Sd. Bône 7/5 for Gibraltar Arr. 11/5
- Convoy HGF 30 Sd. 12/5 Arr. Greenock 22/5 Sd. 23/5 damaged 23/5. Repairs at Clyde 30/5. Sd Greenock 4/6. Arr. Newport 6/6 Sd. Milford Haven 28/6. Listed as member of Convoys OB 174 and OB 175
- Arr. Buenos Aires 30/7 Dep. 6/8 for Rosario arr. 10/8. Sd Rosario for B. Aires Arr. 17/8 Sd. 22/8 for Freetown arr. 10/9.
- Convoy SL48 Sd. 19/9 Arr. Methil Roads 11/10. Convoy FS 311 Sd. 16/10 to pass Southend 18/10. Repairs London 24/10. Sd. Gravesent 7/11. Anchored Southend 7/11. Sd. Southend 8/11 with Convoy FN 329
- Arr. Methil Roads 10/11
- EN23 Sd. 11/11 Attacked 4 miles SE Aberdeen 11/11 abandoned sunk 12/11
- Intended journey London 06/11 to Philadelphia 20/11 for cargo of scrap and steel.

== Loss ==
On 11 November 1940, the Trebartha was a member of the northbound Methil to Oban Convoy EN 23, on her way in ballast from London to Philadelphia for a cargo of scrap and steel.

Coming up the east coast of Scotland, the convoy was attacked by a Heinkel He 111 at 1358, the escorting Avro Anson N.5372 successfully diverting it away; although they were unable to intercept. Four miles SE of Aberdeen the convoy was harried again by a German Heinkel He 115 of 706 Küstenfliegergruppe which attacked and sank both the Trebartha and the SS Creemuir, with loss of four of the Trebartha's crew; and twenty-seven or twenty-nine of the Creemuir's.

Trebartha was struck by an HE bomb, penetrating the bridge and saloon and setting the bridge space bunkers alight. As the men abandoned ship the enemy aircraft machine-gunned the survivor’s boats in the light of the burning ship. They were picked up by the Dutch cargo steamer SS Oberon which, escorted by the lifeboat RNLB Emma Constance, put into Aberdeen where the surviving crew of Trebartha and Creemuir were taken to the Seaman's Mission.

The abandoned Trebartha drifted in the south southeast wind onto the rocks north of Cove Harbour, where she sank the next day. She was reported in December 1940 to have broken in two, "the parts lying on their sides 50 feet apart in about 7 fathoms of water."

== Status ==
The wreck was commercially salvaged around 1950, the explosives used caused the collapse of the tip of the nearby "Poor Man" sea stack. The ship's bell was trawled up around 1999 and auctioned on eBay in 2010.

According to the (BSAC) British Sub-Aqua Club 0906, Deeside Sub Aqua Club, which regularly dive the wreck and post wreck condition reports that the steering quadrant is still visible and upright.
