= Breachway =

Canal from ocean to a lagoon

A breachway is a small canal that connects two bodies of water across a thin piece of land, such as a barrier beach, or the shoreline along such a canal.

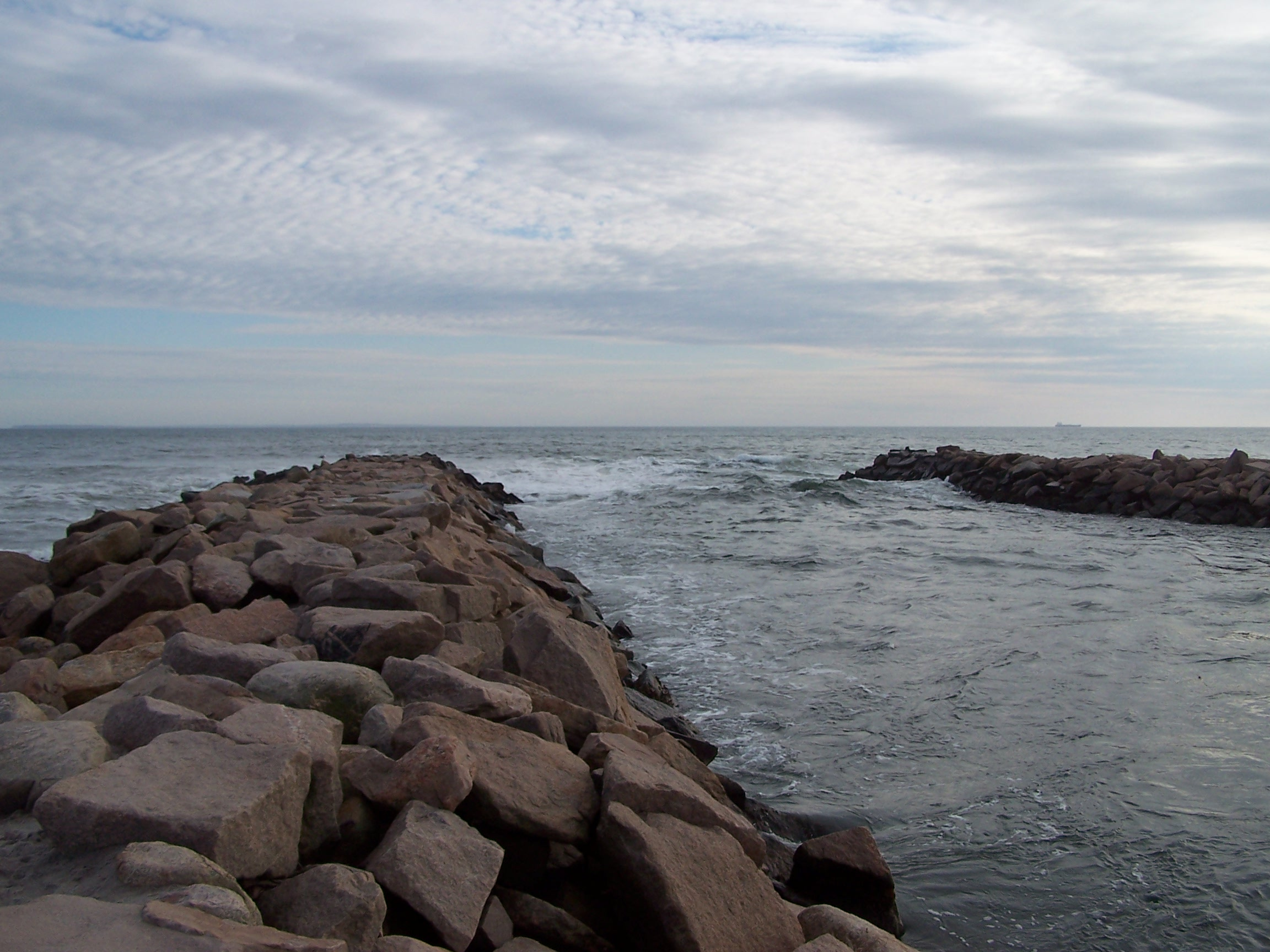
A breachway in Charlestown, RI

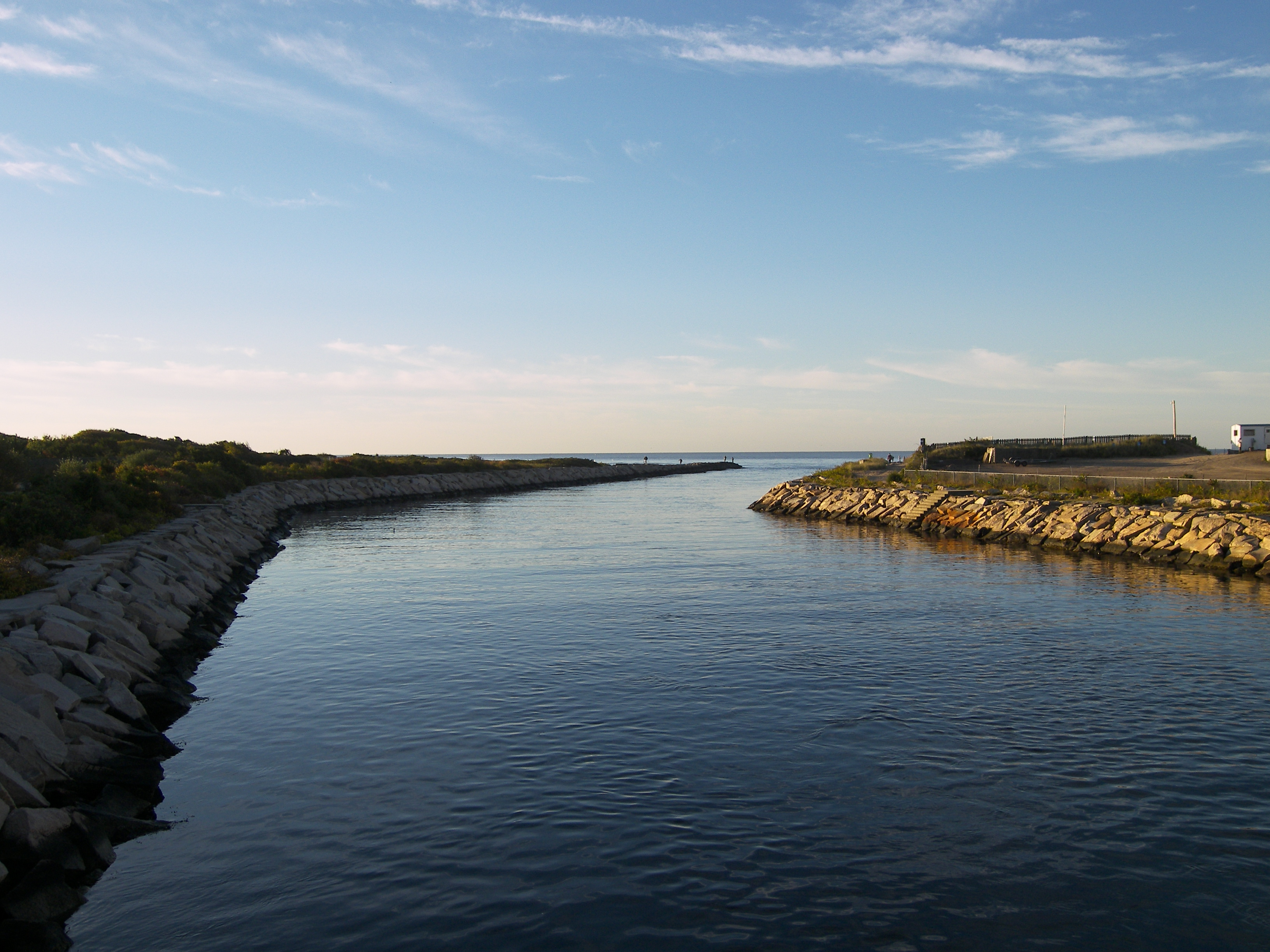
A breachway in Weekapaug, RI

Rhode Island's coastline has multiple breachways, including the Charlestown Breachway and Weekapaug Breachway. The breachways may be used to replicate the transient natural channels that form between barrier islands, connecting lagoons or salt water ponds to the ocean. Such channels can be useful both for improving navigation and the water quality of the lagoon.

Permanent breachways use rock jetties that line the sides of the channel to protect against erosion or closing of the waterway.
