= SS William B. Davock =

Lake freighter sunk in Lake Michigan

Coordinates: 43°58′0″N 86°35′0″W

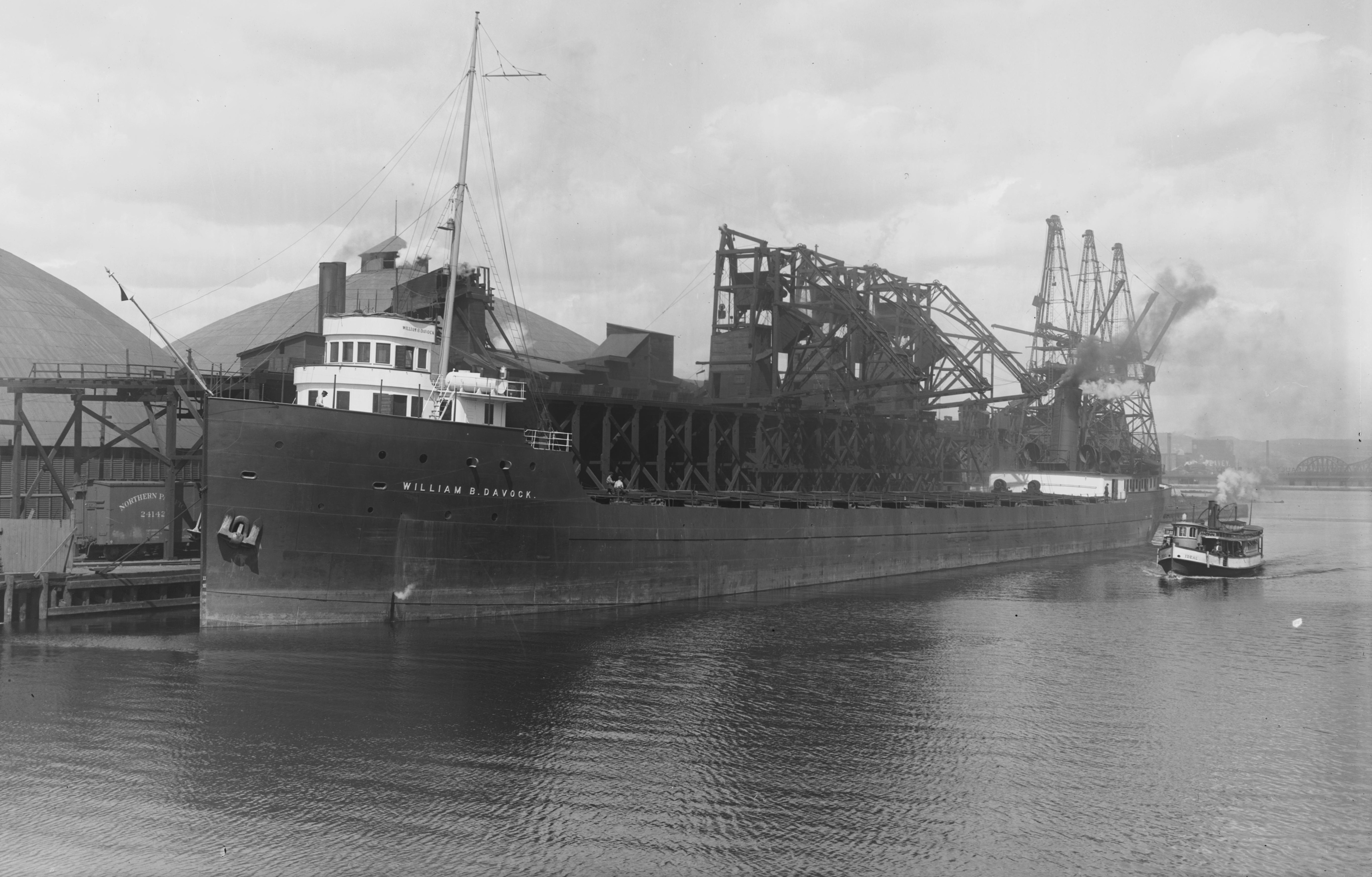
- William B. Davock

History

United States
- Name: William B. Davock
- Operator: Vulcan Steamship Co.; Interlake Steamship Co. (Pickands Mather & Co., Mgrs.)
- Port of registry: (United States) Fairport
- Builder: Great Lakes Engineering Works; St. Clair, Michigan
- Yard number: 00026
- Completed: 1907
- In service: 1907
- Out of service: 1940
- Fate: Foundered off Little Sable Point Light on the Michigan side of Lake Michigan, November 11, 1940

General characteristics
- Type: Conventional dry bulk lake freighter
- Tonnage: 4468
- Length: 420 ft (130 m)
- Beam: 52 ft (16 m)
- Height: 23 ft (7.0 m)
- Propulsion: Single screw, steam reciprocating triple expansion engine
- Speed: 12 kt.
- Capacity: ~7000 tons
- Crew: 32
- Notes: Reconstructed by Interlake Steamship Co., Fairport, OH, winter, 1922-1923 (4220 gross - 2671 net).

The SS William B. Davock was a lake freighter that was constructed in 1907 by Great Lakes Engineering Works, at their St. Clair, Michigan facility for the Vulcan Steamship Co. (R.H. Pigott, Mgr.). She was operated by Vulcan Steamship from 1907 to 1915 in the Great Lakes coal, iron ore, grain and stone trades. In 1915 the ship came under the management of the Interlake Steamship Co. (Pickands Mather & Co., Mgrs.). While laid up for the winter (1922–23) in Fairport, Ohio, she was reconstructed and updated; this work changed her tonnage to 4220 gross and 2671 net. The Davock resumed its traditional trade pattern of coal carried to ports in the upper lakes from Lake Erie and iron ore carried from Lake Superior ports to the steel mills of Lake Erie and Lake Michigan.

The Davock sank on November 11, 1940 as a ferocious storm swept the lakes late on that Monday afternoon. Considered to be the worst storm to that point on Lake Michigan, it saw 75 mph winds and rain turning to snow. Several vessels transiting Lake Michigan were caught with little warning. The Davock, making her way down the lake with coal for Chicago, was presumably overwhelmed at the height of the storm, succumbing to the intense wind and waves and slipping to her final resting place about 200 feet below the surface five miles out from Little Sable Point between Ludington, Michigan and Pentwater, Michigan. None of the 32 (some sources cite 33) hands survived. In total the storm took two vessels and their entire crews (Davock and Anna C. Minch). Several other vessels were damaged or ran aground trying to escape the storm's fury. Overall estimates state 59 sailors were lost in what would be the worst maritime disaster on the Great Lakes since the Great Storm of 1913.

Early in 2015, Michigan Shipwreck Research Association, a 501(c)3 non-profit based in Holland, Michigan, announced the results of a 2014 survey of the wreck which revealed the cause of the William B. Davock's loss was a broken rudder, which jammed against the propeller breaking off one or more blades, rendering the vessel without steering or propulsion. This allowed the boat to fall into the trough of the waves, where it was swamped and perhaps capsized before sinking. It sank in more than 200 feet of water, taking all hands with it. Diver Jeff Vos captured video images of the wreck showing the damaged rudder and propeller.

== The Davock today ==
The sunken hull of the Davock was discovered in May 1972, capsized in over 200 feet (60m) of water, off Little Sable Point Light, not far from the wreck of the SS Anna C. Minch, which went down in the same storm, also with all hands. The light is located south of Pentwater, Michigan.
