= SS Anna C. Minch =

Cargo vessel sank in Lake Michigan

Coordinates: 43.787°N 86.531°W

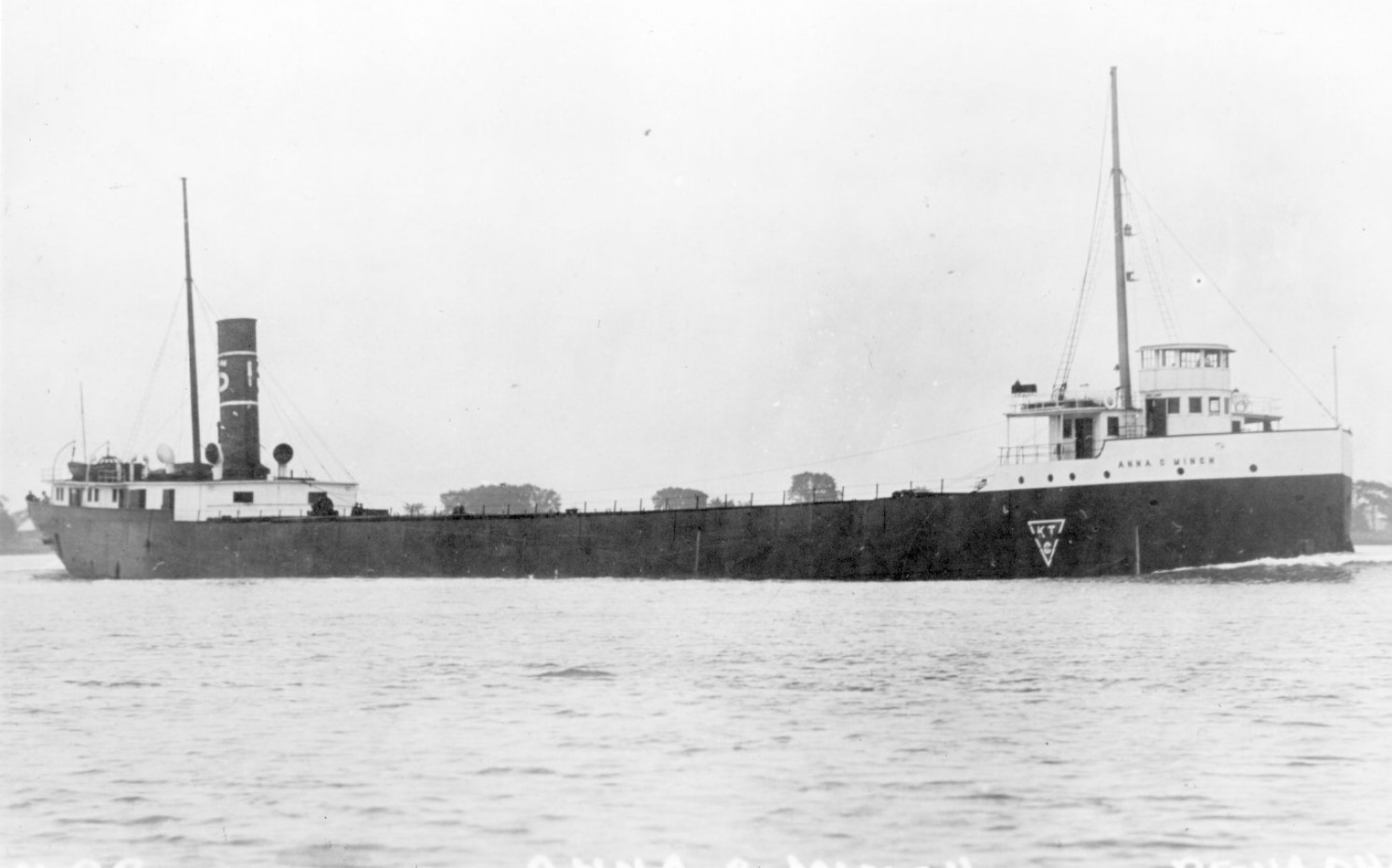
- The Anna C. Minch, before 1940

History

United States
- Name: Anna C. Minch
- Operator: Kinsman Transit Co. Cleveland, Ohio (1903-1926)
- Builder: American Ship Building Company
- Yard number: 415
- Completed: 1903
- Identification: U.S. Registry #107846
- Fate: Sold to the Western Navigation Co. Fort William, Ontario Canada

Canada
- Name: Anna C. Minch
- Operator: The Western Navigation Co. Fort William, Ontario Canada
- Acquired: 1926
- Identification: Canadian Registry #153113
- Fate: Sank off Pentwater, Michigan during Armistice Day Blizzard on 11 November 1940

General characteristics
- Type: Bulk freighter
- Tonnage: 4,285 GRT; 3,229 NRT
- Length: 380 ft (120 m)
- Beam: 50 ft (15 m)
- Height: 28 ft (8.5 m)
- Propulsion: Triple expansion steam engine
- Crew: 24

SS Anna C. Minch was a cargo carrier which foundered, broke in two, and sank in Lake Michigan during the Armistice Day Blizzard on 11 November 1940. The Anna C. Minch was a steam-powered, steel-hulled bulk freighter constructed in 1903 by the American Ship Building Company at Cleveland, Ohio.

All of the crew were lost when the ship sank. The cargo she was in transit with during her final run is disputed, it's mostly unknown what her cargo was at the time she foundered. Her wreckage is located one and a half miles south of Pentwater, Michigan, not far from the wreckage of the SS William B. Davock, which foundered and sank in the same storm.

== Ship history ==
The Anna C. Minch was struck by the steamer Harvey D. Goulder while at the Cargill grain elevator in Superior, Wisconsin on 12 April 1907, resulting in $2000 in damages. On 12 November 1911 she struck a dock in the Chicago River. At Lorain, Ohio on 30 September 1915 she struck the south end of a bridge protection pier on the Erie Avenue Bridge. The Theodore H. Wickwire and the Anna C. Minch tore loose from their mooring lines on Buffalo Creek, drifted downstream and damaged several steamers along with crushing a yacht against a concrete dock on 27 March 1916. She collided with the steamer Charles M. Warner on Lake St. Clair and suffered severe bow damage on 6 November 1916. She was struck by the steamer Steel King on 18 November 1917 while moored at the dock at Toledo, Ohio, suffering starboard bow damage. Her mooring was damaged from the Cleveland, Ohio breakwall when she was struck by the steamers Matthew Andrews and Philip Minch on 26 February 1918. Her rudder was damaged when she was grounded one mile below the St. Clair Ship Canal on 31 August 1920. The Anna C. Minch was struck by the steamer Harry W. Croft at Buffalo, New York on 20 October 1920, also she was grounded in fog on the north end of Bois Blanc Island in the Straits of Mackinac on 17 October 1921. On 21 December 1921 she suffered gale damage at Erie, Pennsylvania and then ice damage in the same location on 23 February 1922. She struck the bottom twice when entering Conneaut, Ohio on 17 October 1923. She suffered wheel damage at Milwaukee, Wisconsin on 22 November 1923. The Anna C. Minch struck the dock at Duluth, Minnesota on 1 November 1924 and also struck a dock at Buffalo, New York on 28 October 1925. She was stranded in fog at Fox Point, Wisconsin on 4 December 1925 and was leaking when she was freed by tug boats.

=== Sinking ===
While steaming through the storm, the Anna Minch decided to hug the land near Little Sable point and close to the Pentwater Harbor entrance and drop anchor hoping to ride the storm out as trying to steam on into the conditions would've been futile against the conditions by the time she foundered. Various sources vary on the cargo she was carrying so it's not known what her cargo was at the time of her loss, when she foundered in the storm. Captain Donald Kennedy and the twenty-three crew were lost. No bodies were ever recovered. Her wreckage is located one and a half miles south of Pentwater, Michigan, not far from the wreckage of the SS William B. Davock, which foundered in the same storm.
