= Finnafjord Port =

Deepwater port and industrial site in Iceland

- Location in Iceland
- Native name: Finnafjörður

Location
- Country: Iceland
- Coordinates: 66.1062°N 15.1502°W

Details
- Operated by: (Germany) Bremenports GmbH

The Finnafjord Port (Icelandic: Finnafjörður [ˈfɪnnaˌfjœrðʏr̥]) is a proposed deepwater port and industrial site in Iceland. Construction is expected to begin between 2021 and 2023 and will continue until at least 2040.

== Background ==
In recent years, Trans-polar shipping along the Northeast Passage has become more viable due to the decline of sea ice in the Arctic Ocean. If Arctic Sea Ice continues to shrink, the Northeast Passage could become navigable year-round, significantly reducing the journey from Asia to the United States.

In 2013, the Icelandic engineering firm EFLA and Bremenports GmbH, which manages the Ports of Bremen in Germany, announced they would investigate the viability of an Arctic trans-shipment hub in Finnafjord.

In 2019, Bremenports announced it had entered into a joint venture agreement with EFLA to construct the port. Currently, Bremenports owns 66% of the port, EFLA owns 26%, and the nearby municipalities of Vopnafjarðarhreppur and Langanesbyggð own 8%.

EFLA claims that the port could be a distribution hub for offshore Arctic oil and mineral resources in Greenland and Iceland.

== Location ==
The Finnafjord Port is located south of the Langanes Peninsula in the Eastern Region. Like many fjords in Iceland, Finnafjord is rich with gravel, which could be used to build up the harbor facility near the coast. The waters around Iceland are ice-free year round due to the Gulf Stream.

== See also ==
- Arctic shipping routes
