= Northeast Passage =

Shipping lane from the Kara Sea to the Pacific Ocean

The Northeast Passage (blue) and an alternative route through the Suez Canal (red)

The Northeast Passage (abbreviated as NEP; Russian: Северо-Восточный проход, romanized: Severo-Vostochnyy prokhod, Norwegian: Nordøstpassasjen) is the shipping route between the Atlantic and Pacific Oceans, along the Arctic coasts of Norway and Russia. The western route through the islands of Canada is accordingly called the Northwest Passage (NWP).

The NEP traverses (from west to east) the Barents Sea, Kara Sea, Laptev Sea, East Siberian Sea, and Chukchi Sea, and it includes the Northern Sea Route (NSR). The Northern Sea Route is a portion of the NEP. It is defined in Russian law and does not include the Barents Sea and therefore does not reach the Atlantic Ocean. However, since the NSR has a significant overlap over the majority of the NEP, the NSR term is often used to refer to the entirety of the Northeast Passage. This practice injects confusion in understanding the specifics of both navigational procedures and jurisdiction.

The Northeast Passage is one of several Arctic maritime routes, the others being the Northwest Passage (going through the Canadian Arctic Archipelago and the coast of Alaska) and the Transpolar Route (going across the North Pole).

The first confirmed attempt to complete the passage from west to east was made by Adolf Erik Nordenskiöld, a Finland-Swedish explorer, and a former member of Russian Academy of Sciences. He did it on a Swedish ship Vega (1878–1879), backed by the royal funding of king Oscar II of Sweden. Nordenskiöld was forced to winter just a few days' sailing distance from the Bering Strait, due to pack ice.

== History ==
=== 11th to 17th centuries ===
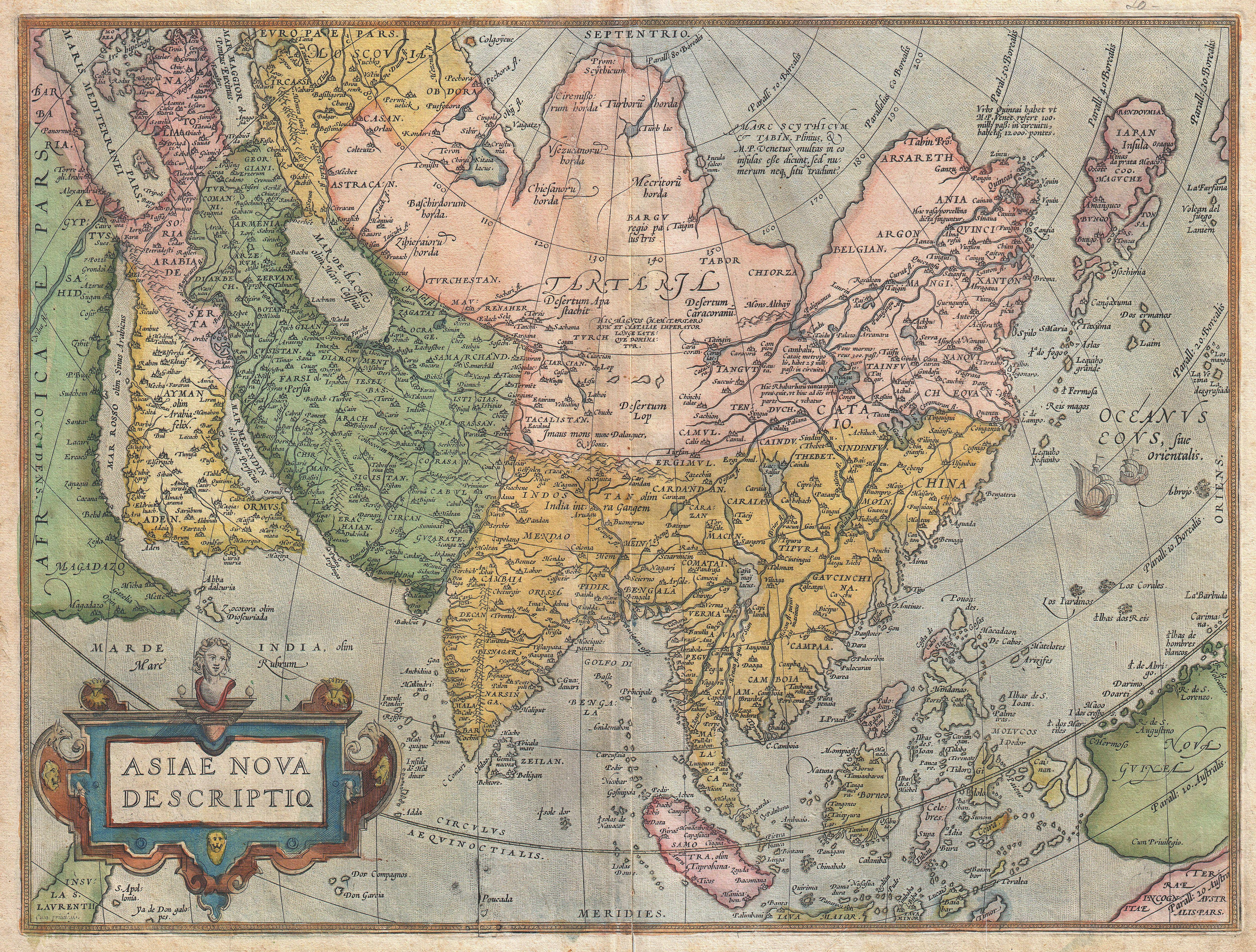
First edition of the important map of Asia by Abraham Ortelius (1572). Ortelius marks a vast network of waterways across East Asia, advocating his belief that a shipping route existed through China to the Northern Sea and thence, by way of the Northeast Passage, to Europe.

The motivation to navigate the Northeast passage was initially economic. In Russia, the idea of a possible seaway connecting the Atlantic and the Pacific Oceans was first proposed by the diplomat Gerasimov in 1525. However, Russian settlers and traders on the coast of the White Sea, the Pomors, had been exploring parts of the route as early as the 11th century. Grigory Istoma wrote about his 1496 voyage along the passage, which was later published by Sigismund von Herberstein and influenced the planning of future expeditions.

During a sail across the Barents Sea in search of the Northeast Passage in 1553, English explorer Hugh Willoughby thought he saw islands to the north, and islands called Willoughby's Land were shown on maps published by Plancius and Mercator in the 1590s, and they continued to appear on maps by Jan Janssonius and Willem Blaeu into the 1640s.

By the 17th century, traders had established a continuous sea route from Arkhangelsk to the Yamal Peninsula, where they portaged to the Gulf of Ob. This route, known as the Mangazeya seaway, after its eastern terminus, the trade depot of Mangazeya, was an early precursor to the Northern Sea Route.

East of the Yamal, the route north of the Taimyr Peninsula proved impossible or impractical. East of the Taimyr, from the 1630s, Russians began to sail the Arctic coast from the mouth of the Lena River to a point beyond the mouth of the Kolyma River. Both Vitus Bering (in 1728) and James Cook (in 1778) entered the Bering Strait from the south and sailed some distance northwest, but from 1648 (Semyon Dezhnev) to 1879 (Adolf Erik Nordenskiöld) no one is recorded as having sailed eastward between the Kolyma and Bering Strait.

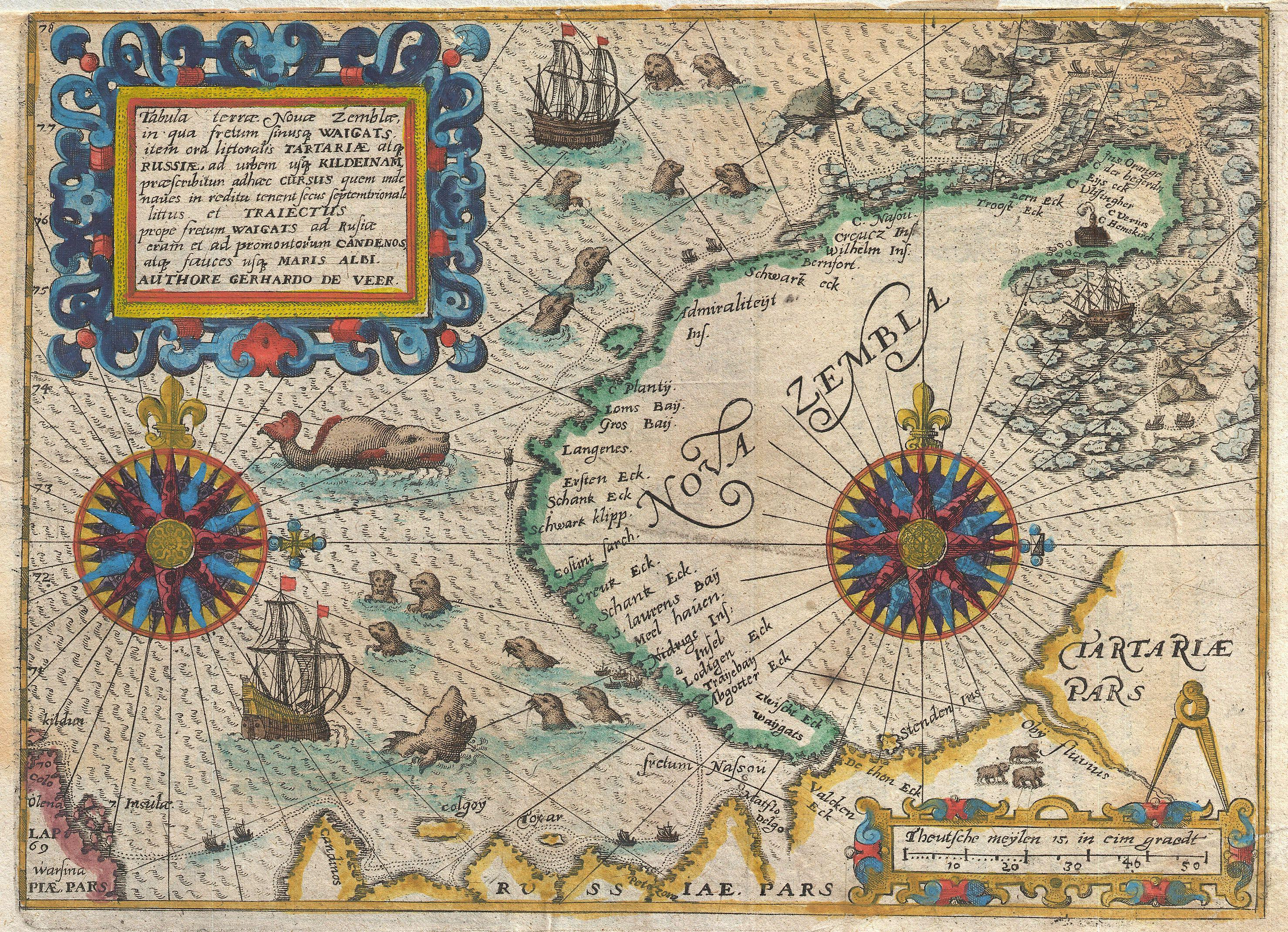
Map drawn in 1601 by Theodore de Bry to describe the ill-fated third voyage of the Dutch explorer Willem Barentsz in search of the Northeast Passage

The western parts of the passage were explored by northern European countries such as England, the Netherlands, Denmark, and Norway, looking for an alternative seaway to China and India; had it proved practicable, such a seaway would have had enormous economic and military importance. Although these expeditions failed, new coasts and islands were discovered. The most notable was the 1596 expedition led by Dutch navigator Willem Barentsz, who discovered Spitsbergen and Bear Island, and rounded the north end of Novaya Zemlya.

Fearing English and Dutch penetration into Siberia, Russia closed the Mangazeya seaway in 1619. Pomor activity in Northern Asia declined and most Arctic exploration in the 17th century was carried out by Siberian Cossacks, sailing from one river mouth to another in their Arctic-worthy kochs. In 1648, the most famous of these expeditions, led by Fedot Alekseev and Semyon Dezhnev, sailed east from the mouth of the Kolyma River to the Pacific Ocean, and rounded the Chukchi Peninsula, thus proving that no land connection existed between Asia and North America.

=== 18th and 19th centuries ===
Eighty years after Dezhnev, in 1728, another Russian explorer, Danish-born Vitus Bering on Svyatoy Gavriil (Saint Gabriel) made a similar voyage in reverse, starting in Kamchatka and going north to the passage that now bears his name; the Bering Strait. It was Bering who named the Diomede Islands, which Dezhnev had vaguely mentioned.

Bering's explorations of 1725–30 were part of a larger scheme of Peter the Great, known as the Great Northern Expedition.

The Second Kamchatka Expedition took place in 1735–42, with two ships, Svyatoy Pyotr (Saint Peter) and Svyatoy Pavel (Saint Paul), the latter commanded by Bering's deputy in the first expedition, Captain Aleksey Chirikov. During the Second Expedition Bering became the first Westerner to sight the coast of northwestern North America, and Chirikov was the first Westerner to land there (a storm had separated the two ships earlier). On his return leg, Bering discovered the Aleutian Islands but fell ill, and Svyatoy Pyotr had to take shelter on an island off Kamchatka, where Bering died (Bering Island).

Independent of Bering and Chirikov, other Russian Imperial Navy parties took part in the Second Great Northern Expedition. One of these, led by Semyon Chelyuskin, in May 1742 reached Cape Chelyuskin, the northernmost point of both the Northeast Passage and the Eurasian continent.

Later expeditions to explore the Northeast Passage took place in the 1760s (Vasiliy Chichagov), 1785–95 (Joseph Billings and Gavril Sarychev), the 1820s and 1830s (Baron Ferdinand Petrovich Wrangel, Pyotr Fyodorovich Anjou, Count Fyodor Litke and others). The possibility of navigating the length of the passage was proven by the mid-19th century.

However, it was only in 1878-79 that Fenno-Swedish explorer Adolf Erik Nordenskiöld (born in Finland but exiled to Sweden many years before the expedition) made the first complete passage of the Northeast Passage, leading the Vega expedition from west to east. The ship's captain on this expedition was Lieutenant Louis Palander of the Swedish Royal Navy.

One year before Nordenskiöld's voyage, commercial exploitation of a section of the route started with the so-called Kara expeditions, exporting Siberian agricultural produce via the Kara Sea. Of 122 convoys between 1877 and 1919 only 75 succeeded, transporting as little as 55 tons of cargo. From 1911 the Kolyma River steamboats ran from Vladivostok to the Kolyma once a year.

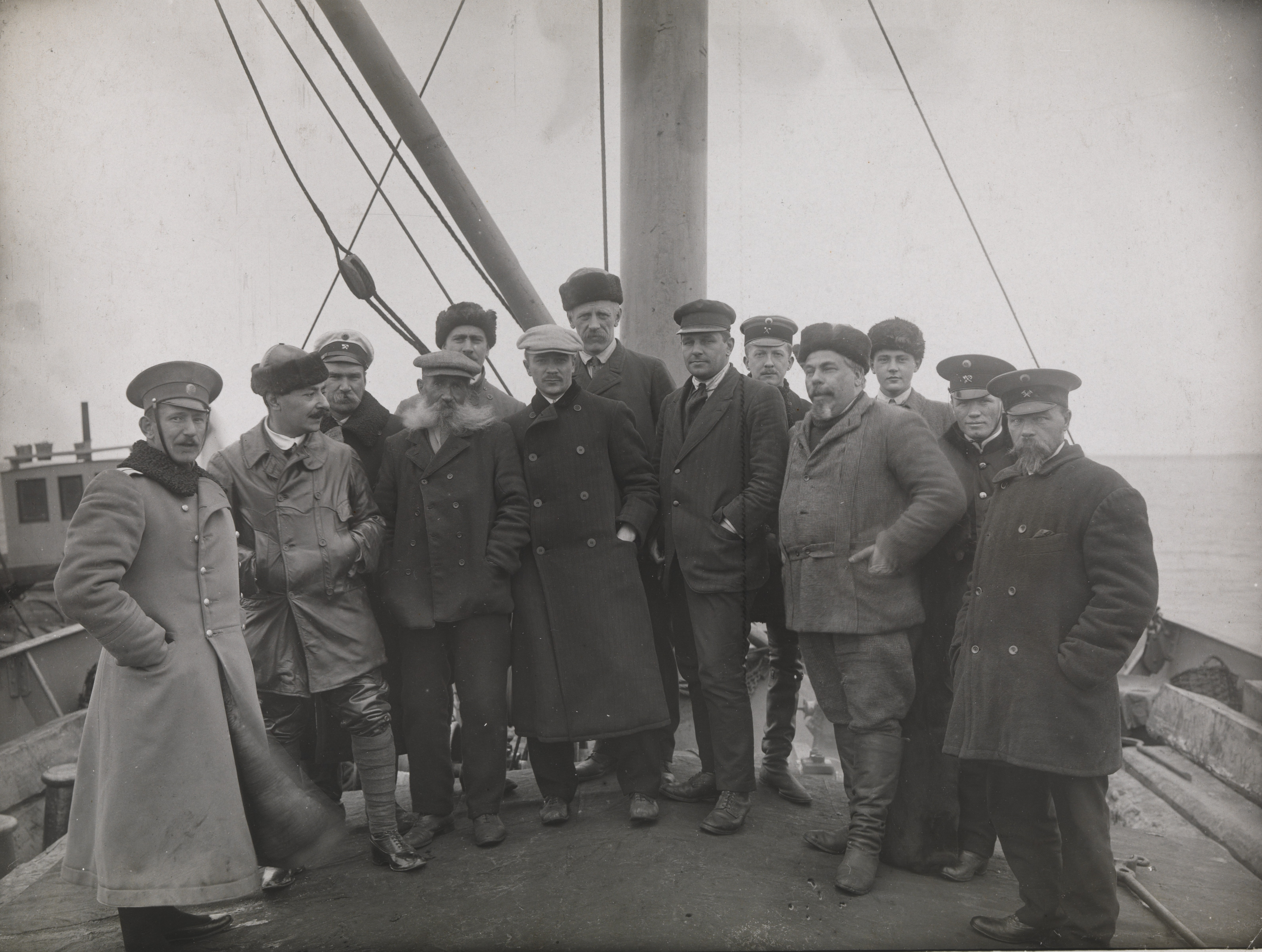
One of the pictures from Jonas Lied's and Nansen's journey to Siberia (2 August to 26 October 1913). Nansen is the tall man in the centre, number 2 from left hand is Loris-Melikov, number 5 partly concealed is Lied, number 10 is Vostrotin. Fridtjof Nansen started his trans-Siberian travel on a freighter from Oslo to the Yenisei. The journey went through parts of the Northeast Passage, which was to be opened as a shorter trading connection between Western Europe and the Far East. The photograph depicts the encounter of some of the ship's crew with officers from the Russian barges at the mouth of the Yenisei River.

In 1912, two Russian expeditions set out; Captain Georgy Brusilov and the Brusilov Expedition in the Santa Anna, and Captain Alexander Kuchin with Vladimir Rusanov in the Gerkules (Hercules); each with a woman on board. Both expeditions were hastily arranged, and both disappeared. The German Arctic Expedition of 1912, led by Herbert Schröder-Stranz, ended disastrously with only 7 of 15 crew members surviving the preliminary expedition to Nordaustlandet.

In 1913 Jonas Lied organized a successful expedition through the Kara Sea to the Yenisei. Explorer and scientist Fridtjof Nansen and Siberian industrialist Stephan Vostrotin were prominent passengers. Lied had founded The Siberian company with the purpose of exporting and importing goods through the great Siberian rivers and the Kara Sea. The 1913 trip is recorded in Nansen's Through Siberia.

In 1915, a Russian expedition led by Boris Vilkitskiy made the passage from east to west with the icebreakers Taymyr and Vaygach.

Nordenskiöld, Nansen, Amundsen, DeLong, Makarov and others also led expeditions, mainly for scientific and cartographic purposes.

=== After the Russian Revolution ===
The introduction of radio, steamboats, and icebreakers made running the Northern Sea Route viable. After the Russian Revolution of 1917, the Soviet Union was isolated from the western powers, which made it imperative to use this route. Besides being the shortest seaway between the western and far eastern USSR, it was the only one that lay completely inside Soviet internal waters and did not impinge on waters of opposing countries.

In 1932, a Soviet expedition on the icebreaker A. Sibiryakov led by Professor Otto Yulievich Schmidt was the first to sail all the way from Arkhangelsk to the Bering Strait in the same summer without wintering en route. After trial runs in 1933 and 1934, the Northern Sea Route was officially defined and open and commercial exploitation began in 1935. The next year, part of the Baltic Fleet made the passage to the Pacific where armed conflict with Japan was looming.

A special governing body Glavsevmorput (Chief Directorate of the Northern Sea Route) was set up in 1932, with Otto Schmidt as its director. It supervised navigation and built Arctic ports.

During the early part of World War II, the Soviets allowed the German auxiliary cruiser Komet to use the Northern Sea Route in the summer of 1940 to evade the British Royal Navy and break out into the Pacific Ocean. Komet was escorted by Soviet icebreakers during her journey. After the start of the Soviet-German War, the Soviets transferred several destroyers from the Pacific Fleet to the Northern Fleet via the Arctic. The Soviets also used the Northern Sea Route to transfer materials from the Soviet Far East to European Russia, and the Germans launched Operation Wunderland to interdict this traffic.

A convoy of seven brand-new merchant vessels (900 DWT to 5500 DWT) built for the People's Republic of China but sailing under the Polish flag from Gdynia, reached the port of Pevek (via the Kara, Vilkitsky, Dmitry Laptev and Sannikov Straits), two days of navigation before the Bering Strait in 1956.

In July 1965, USCGC Northwind (WAGB-282), commanded by Captain Kingdrel N. Ayers USCG, conducted an oceanographic survey between Greenland, Iceland, and Scotland and was the first western vessel to operate in the Kara Sea of the Soviet Union, for which she received the Coast Guard Unit Commendation with Operational Distinguishing Device. The real (then-classified) mission of Northwind was to attempt a transit of the "Northeast Passage". The effort was not successful due to diplomatic reasons and caused an international incident between the U.S.S.R. and U.S.A.

=== After the Soviet Union ===
After the Soviet Union dissolved in the early 1990s, commercial navigation in the Siberian Arctic went into decline. Regular shipping is found only from Murmansk to Dudinka in the west and between Vladivostok and Pevek in the east. Ports between Dudinka and Pevek see virtually no shipping. Logashkino and Nordvik were abandoned and are now ghost towns.

Renewed interest led to several demonstration voyages in 1997 including the passage of the Finnish product tanker Uikku.

A January 2013 Reuters News report on expanding Russian arctic natural gas shipments to Asia, stated that while shipping traffic on the NSR surged in 2012 to around 1 million tons of various kinds of cargoes, "it pales by comparison with the 1987 peak of 6.6 million tons." It also reported that the Finnish crude oil tanker Uikku was the first non-Russian energy vessel to brave the NSR in 1997.

Now the NSR is developing rapidly. In 2021 85 ships with around 2.75m tons of cargo made their way along the NSR, only 12 of which were under the Russian flag.

== Northern Sea Route ==
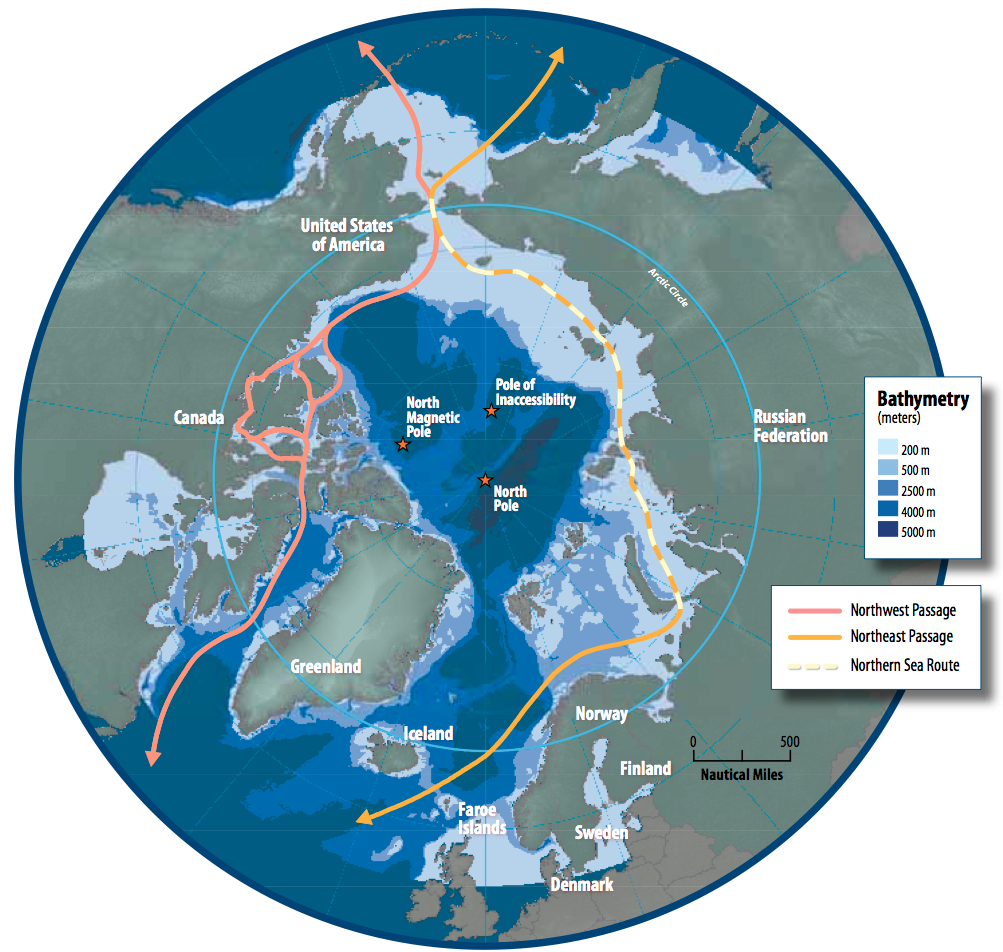
Map of the Arctic region showing the Northern Sea Route (yellow & white dash line), in the context of the Northeast Passage, and Northwest Passage

A similar route to the NEP is the Northern Sea Route (NSR). The NSR is a shipping route that administratively begins at the boundary between the Barents and Kara Seas (the Kara Strait) and ends in the Bering Strait (Cape Dezhnev). The length of the Northern Sea Route from the Kara Gates to Provideniya Bay is about 5600 km. The distance from St. Petersburg to Vladivostok through the NSR is over 14 thousand km (for comparison, the same distance through the Suez Canal is over 23 thousand km). The Northern Sea Route serves the Arctic ports and major rivers of Siberia by importing fuel, equipment, food and exporting timber and minerals. The Suez or Panama Canal are the alternatives to the Northern Sea Route. However, if the distance from the port of Murmansk (Russia) to the port of Yokohama (Japan) through the Suez Canal is 12,840 nautical miles, the same itinerary along the Northern Sea Route equals only 5,770 nautical miles.

Therefore, the NEP encompasses all the East Arctic seas, and the NSR all the seas except the Barents Sea. Since the NSR constitutes the majority of the NEP, sometimes the term NSR has been used to refer to the entirety of the NEP.

== Governance ==
The governance of the NEP has developed considerably in the late 20th and early 21st centuries. The main sources of governance are the United Nations Convention on the Law of the Sea (UNCLOS), the Arctic Council (AC), the International Maritime Organization (IMO), and the domestic legislation of the Russian Federation. In combination, they cover territorial claims, economic exploitation, technical shipping requirements, environmental protection, and search and rescue responsibilities.

For example, Rosatom assumes the possibility and functions of the NSR. Rosatom is a state corporation that organizes the navigation of vessels in the waters of the NSR in accordance with the Merchant Shipping Code, manages a fleet of powerful nuclear icebreakers, ensures the safety and uninterrupted operation of navigation, provides port services for gas tankers in case of unfavorable weather conditions. Rosatom also provides navigation and hydrographic support in the waters of the Northern Sea Route, develops the infrastructure of sea harbors, and manages the state property of these ports. For this purpose, the Directorate of the Northern Sea Route was formed, that now manages three subordinate organizations "Atomflot" (ROSATOMFLOT), "Hydrographic Enterprise" and "ChukotAtomEnergo".

Recently, the "Main Directorate of the Northern Sea Route" ("Glavsevmorput") was established on the basis of the Naval Operations Headquarters of FSUE "Atomflot". The main purpose of the creation of the Glavsevmorput is to organize the navigation of vessels in the waters of the Northern Sea Route. Glavsevmorput Federal State Budgetary Institution solves the following tasks: ensuring the organization of icebreaking vessels taking into account the hydrometeorological, ice, and navigation conditions in the waters of the NSR; vessels navigation in the waters of the NSR; issuance, suspension, renewal, and termination of permits for sailing vessels in the waters of the NSR. To solve these tasks, the department arranges icebreaker fleet vessels in the waters of the NSR, monitors the traffic in the NSR water area, provides information on hydrometeorological, ice, and navigation conditions, and processes information from vessels located in the NSR water area. Rosatom is a Legacy Member of the Arctic Economic Council, that's why all the operations are aimed to establish economic well-being, environmental neutrality, and human capital development.

== Pacific-Atlantic distances ==
The Northeast Passage is a shorter route to connect Northeast Asia with Western Europe, compared to the existing routes through the Suez Canal, the Panama Canal, or around the Cape of Good Hope. The table below shows the sailing distances between the major East Asia sea ports, and Rotterdam in Europe (these distances assume no route diversions owing to ice conditions).

Sailing distances between Asia and Europe through the NEP (in nautical miles)
	To Rotterdam, via:			
From	Cape of Good Hope	Suez Canal	NEP	Difference between Suez and NEP
Yokohama, Japan	14,448	11,133	7,010	37%
Busan, South Korea	14,084	10,744	7,667	29%
Shanghai, China	13,796	10,557	8,046	24%
Hong Kong, China	13,014	9,701	8,594	11%
Ho Chi Minh City, Vietnam	12,258	8,887	9,428	−6%

=== Commercial value ===
A usable Northern Sea Route between northern Europe and North Pacific ports would cut time at sea (and resultant fuel consumption) by more than half. For the corporate players in bulk shipping of relative low-value raw materials, cost savings for fuel may appear as a driver to explore the Northern Sea Route for commercial transits, and not necessarily reduced lead time. The Northern Sea Route allows economies of scale compared to coastal route alternatives, with vessel draught and beam limitation. Environmental demands faced by the maritime shipping industry may emerge as a driver for developing the Northern Sea Route. Increased awareness of environmental benefits and costs for both the Northern Sea Route and Suez routes will probably be important factors in this respect.

In 2011, four ships sailed the length of the Northern Sea Route and Northeast Passage, from the Atlantic to Pacific Oceans. In 2012, 46 ships sailed the NSR.

In August 2012, Russian media reported that 85% of vessels transiting the Northern Sea Route in 2011 were carrying gas or oil, and 80% were high-capacity tankers.

As the Northern Sea Route is a strategically important transport artery, it can already be called economically profitable in comparison, for example, with the Suez Canal due to a number of reasons:

- Fuel savings due to reduced distance;
- The shorter distance reduces the cost of staff labor and chartering vessels;
- The Northern Sea Route does not charge payments for the passage (unlike, for example, the Suez Canal);
- There are no queues (unlike, for example, the Suez Canal);
- There is no risk of a pirate attack.

=== Environmental concerns ===
In September 2012, Inuit Circumpolar Conference Chair Jimmy Stotts was reported as saying there is concern that increased shipping could adversely affect indigenous hunting of marine mammals. Also concerning is the lack of infrastructure on the Western Alaska coast to deal with a spill or a wrecked vessel.

However, a polar opinion also does exist. The Northern Sea route is considerably shorter than the existing sea routes from Asia to Europe, which makes it more ecological due to less emission of CO_{2}. A usable Northern Sea Route between northern Europe and North Pacific ports would cut time at sea (and, accordingly, fuel consumption) by more than half. For the corporate players in bulk shipping of relative low-value raw materials, cost savings for fuel may appear as a driver to explore the Northern Sea Route for commercial transits, and not necessarily reduced lead time. The Northern Sea Route allows economies of scale compared to coastal route alternatives, with vessel draught and beam limitation. Environmental demands faced by the maritime shipping industry may emerge as a driver for developing the Northern Sea Route. With the NSR each year becoming more navigable for commercial shipping nations such as China may be inclined to change their traditional shipping routes from the Suez Cannel to the NSR. This could triple or even quadruple the NSR's shipping tonnage.

According to the Fourth IMO GHG Study 2020, sea cargo transportation is responsible for 2.9% of global emissions. More than that, in the next 20 years the trading maritime volume is expected to double, which may cause even worse consequences for the environment. Now marine transport produces about 1 gigaton of carbon dioxide (CO_{2}) emissions per year and has been struggling for many years to reduce its environmental impact. For example, the International Maritime Organization (IMO) has obliged sea carriers to reduce CO_{2} emissions by 50% by 2050. It may seem very realistic, but achieving this result may become a tough challenge. Firstly, marine transport generates 14% of all transport emissions, and, secondly, effective techniques that could replace marine engines powered by fossil fuels do not exist yet. Due to its shorter length, navigation on the NSR contributes to reducing the carbon footprint of maritime transport thus contributing to the achievement of the Paris Agreement goals.

== Ice conditions ==
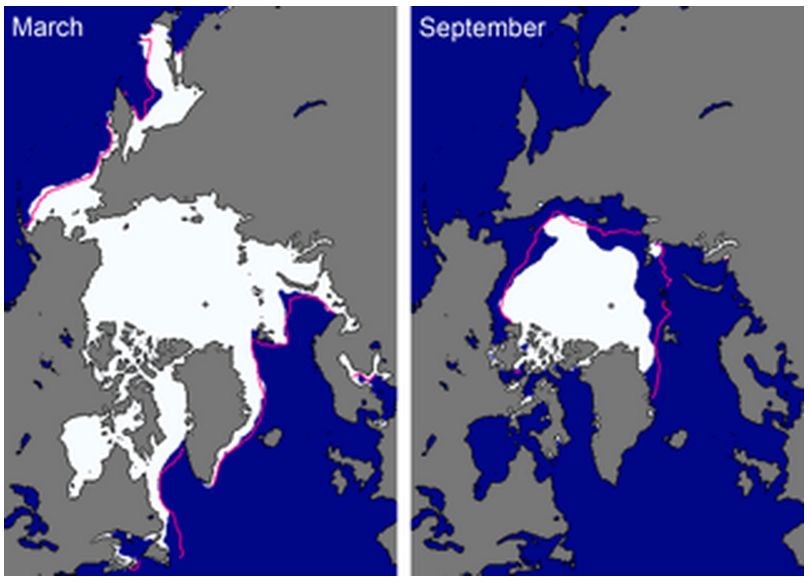
Sea ice extent in March 2013 (left) and September 2013 (right), illustrating the respective monthly averages during the winter maximum and summer minimum extents. The magenta lines indicate the median ice extents in March and September, respectively, during the period 1981–2010.

Unlike the similar latitudes in Alaska and Canada (along the Northwest Passage), parts of the NEP remain ice-free year-round. This is mostly the case of the Barents Sea, by the northern coast of Norway and Northwestern coast of Russia. The Barents sea is affected by the currents of warm water from the Gulf Stream, feeding into the North Atlantic.

Other parts of the NEP (mostly the NSR part), freeze in winter and partially melt in the summer months, especially along the coasts. Since the early 2000s the summer melting has been stronger, and the winter freezing has been weaker, opening the waters to the possibility of more non-ice breaking ships taking advantage of the route for longer periods of time.

=== Ice-free ports ===
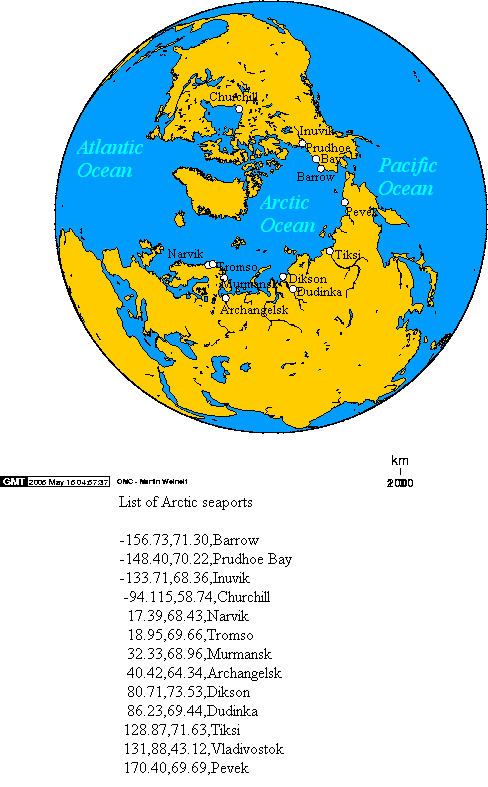
Arctic Ocean seaports

Only one Russian seaport in the Barents Sea along the officially defined Northern Sea Route (which begins at the Kara Gates Strait) is ice-free year-round, Murmansk on the Kola Peninsula. Other Arctic ports are generally usable from July to October, or, such as Dudinka, are served by nuclear-powered icebreakers. Beyond the Bering Strait, the end of the Northern Sea Route, and south along Russia's Pacific seaboard Petropavlovsk in Kamchatka, Vanino, Nakhodka, and Vladivostok are accessible year-round.

The development of the icebreaking fleet is the most important condition for constant navigation in Arctic waters. Since 2008, the structure of Rosatom includes the Russian nuclear icebreaker fleet, which is the largest in the world with a container ship, four service vessels and seven nuclear-powered icebreakers ("Yamal", "50 Let Pobedy", "Taymyr", "Vaygach", "Arctic", "Siberia" and Ural). The last three are the latest universal icebreakers of the 22220 project, and the world's only transport vessel with the Sevmorput nuclear power plant in operation.

== Transit shipping activity ==
Due to its harsh climatic conditions and the low population density, the NEP has had relatively little activity. The NSR portion of the NEP experienced its highest levels of activity during the Soviet era. The NSR greatly developed as a heavily subsidized domestic route, with traffic peaking in 1987 with 6.58 million tons of cargo carried by 331 ships over 1306 voyages. With the end of the Soviet Union and its subsidies, the NSR traffic collapsed to 1.5–2 M tons of cargo.

Since the early 2000s, the thickness and area extent of the Arctic sea ice has experienced significant reduction, compared to the recorded averages. This has led to an increase in transit shipping. In 2011, four ships sailed the entire length of the NEP, 46 in 2012, and 19 in 2013. The number of trips is still very small compared to the thousands of ships each year through the Suez Canal. Mainstream container shipping is expected to continue to overwhelmingly use the Suez route, while niche activities like bulk shipping is expected to grow, driven by the mining industries of the Arctic.

Nevertheless, the cargo traffic is steadily growing every year. The research shows that the NSR-SCR combined shipping scheme can be more competitive than the use of the Suez Canal Route only. If the shipping company provides sufficient loading on the NSR, uses a reliable ice-class vessel for navigation and the price of crude oil is high, the economic advantage of the NSR-SCR combined shipping scheme is obvious. Ice thickness directly affects the shipping cost. Now, when the Arctic ice is slowly melting due to weather conditions, the cost of icebreaking service is expected to reduce. Also, vessels of some ice classes can sail on the NSR independently. That is why the NSR icebreaker escort fee may be several times lower than the SCR toll.

State Corporation Rosatom assumes the possibility and functions of the NSR and ensures the safety of navigation on the high technological level. Besides organizing the navigation along the NSR and the icebreaking services with the world's only nuclear icebreaker fleet, Rosatom is planning to implement the Arctic Ice Regime Shipping System (AIRSS) methodology. This system will represent a digital space that will provide various services to cargo carriers, shipowners, captains, insurers, and other participants in the logistics market on the NSR. In particular, it involves issuing permits for the passage of vessels, monitoring, dispatching, and managing the work of the fleet. The single digital platform will collect information from all the available sources, for example, hydrometeorological data, the location of ships and icebreakers, port congestion. As a result, users will receive an advanced "ice navigator" that will allow to plot a precise route in view of the changing ice conditions of the NSR. In other words, the study of Sibul et al. proposed a path-finding algorithm for the NSR strategic assessment. It uses real weather as input and find the optimal shipping route. More recent studies emphasize the need to account for uncertainty in ice conditions when planning routes in the ice, as relying on averaged conditions may lead to misleading assessments.

=== Ice-free navigation ===
Nuclear icebreaker NS 50 Let Pobedy escorting the Beluga Fraternity and Beluga Foresight through the Northern Sea Route in 2009

The term "ice free" generally refers to the absence of fast ice, i.e. continuously frozen surface ice sheet cover. Under common usage "ice free" does not mean that there is no Arctic sea ice. "Ice free" regions can contain broken ice cover of varying density, often still requiring appropriately strengthened hulls or icebreaker support for safe passage.

French sailor Eric Brossier made the first passage by sailboat in only one season in the summer of 2002. He returned to Europe the following summer through the Northwest Passage.

The same year Arved Fuchs and its crew sailed the Northeast Passage with the Dagmar Aaen.

The Northern Sea Route was opened by receding ice in 2005 but was closed by 2007. The amount of polar ice had receded to 2005 levels in August 2008. In late August 2008, it was reported that images from the NASA Aqua satellite had revealed that the last ice blockage of the Northern Sea Route in the Laptev Sea had melted. This would have been the first time since satellite records began that both the Northwest Passage and Northern Sea Route had been open simultaneously. However, other scientists suggested that the satellite images may have been misread and that the sea route was not yet passable.

In 2009, the Bremen-based Beluga Group claimed they were the first Western company to attempt to cross the Northern Sea Route for shipping without assistance from icebreakers, cutting 4000 nautical miles off the journey between Ulsan, Korea and Rotterdam. The voyage was widely covered and sometimes incorrectly said to be the first time that non-Russian ships made the transit. In 1997, a Finnish oil tanker, Uikku, sailed the length of the Northern Sea Route from Murmansk to the Bering Strait, becoming the first Western ship to complete the voyage.

However, the new (2008) ice-strengthened heavy lift vessels Beluga Fraternity and Beluga Foresight commenced an East-to-West passage of the Northern Sea Route in August 2009 as part of a small convoy escorted by the Russian nuclear icebreaker NS 50 Let Pobedy, westward through the Bering, Sannikov, and Vilkitskiy Straits. The two vessels embarked Russian ice pilots for the voyage to the western Siberian port of Novyy, in the Yamburg region in the delta of the Ob River. The ships arrived at Novyy on 7 September, discharged their cargo to barges and departed on 12 September, bound for the Kara Gates and Rotterdam. They were the first non-Russian commercial vessels to complete this journey, but not without Russian assistance. The captain of the Beluga Foresight, Valeriy Durov, described the achievement as "...great news for our industry." The president of Beluga Shipping claimed the voyage saved each vessel about 300,000 euros, compared to the normal Korea-to-Rotterdam route by way of the Suez Canal. The company did not disclose how much they paid for the escort service and the Russian pilots. An 18 September 2009 press release stated that the company was planning for six vessels to make Arctic deliveries in 2010. It is not clear that this plan was followed up on.

In 2009, the first two international commercial cargo vessels traveled north of Russia between Europe and Asia. In 2011, 18 ships made the now mostly ice-free transit. During 2011, 34 ships made the transit up from a total of 6 ships in 2010. In 2012, 46 commercial ships made the transit. Petroleum products constituted the largest cargo group. In 2013 71 commercial ships made the transit.

On 28 July 2009, the sailing yacht RX II (36-foot length), with expedition leader Trond Aasvoll and crew Hans Fredrik Haukland and Finn Andreassen left Vardø in Norway on a quest to circumnavigate the North Pole. The northern sea route proved ice free and the three Norwegians sailed into the Bering Strait on 24 September. But Russian bureaucracy managed to do what the arctic waters did not – to stop their effort to sail around in one season. The boat over-wintered in Nome, and finished the trip through the Northwest passage the following summer.

Also in 2009, Ola Skinnarmo and his crew sailed the Northeast Passage aboard Explorer of Sweden, becoming the second Swedish sailboat to transit the Northeast Passage, after Adolf Erik Nordenskiöld.

In September 2010, two yachts circumnavigated the Arctic: Børge Ousland's team aboard The Northern Passage, and Sergei Murzayev's team in the Peter I. These were the first recorded instances of the circumnavigation of the Arctic by sailing yachts in one season.

The largest ship as of 2011 is the 117,000 tonne SCF Baltica loaded with natural-gas condensate.

In 2012, the 288-metre (945 ft) LNG carrier Ob River became the first ship of its kind to transit the Northern Sea Route. The vessel completed the westbound voyage in ballast in only six days and planned to sail back to Asia in November with a full load of liquified natural gas. The growth in traffic has been startling. 46 ships sailed the entire length from Europe to East Asia during 2012. By July 2013, the administrators of the Northern Sea Route had granted permission to 204 ships to sail during the season. By that time, Arctic sea ice had declined substantial especially on the Atlantic side of the Arctic. "On July 15 extent came within 540,000 square kilometers (208,000 square miles) of that seen in 2012 on the same date... (Compared to the 1981 to 2010 average, ice extent on July 15, 2013 was 1.06 million square kilometers (409,000 square miles) below average.)" (Summer 2012 Arctic sea ice volume reached a record low.)

During early September 2013 the Russian battlecruiser Petr Velikiy led a flotilla of Russian navy ships with icebreaker support along the Northern Sea Route to the New Siberian Islands. About 400 ships were expected to transit the Russian portion of the route during the 2013 season, up from about 40 during 2012.

On 15 September 2015, the Chinese trimaran Qingdao China set a speed record by sailing from Murmansk to the Bering Strait in 13 days.

On 3 October 2019 Nanni Acquarone became the first Italian skipper with the Italian cutter Best Explorer to sail both Northwest Passage in 2012 and Northeast Passage with a sailboat clockwise. Best Explorer started 1 June 2012 from Tromsø (Norway) sailing the Northwest Passage (first Italian boat and Italian skipper) and after several years of sailing in the Pacific got the permission to follow the Northeast Passage without assistance and without a Russian on board with a crew of five, including Salvatore Magri who sailed the Northwest Passage with Nanni. In 2019 Best Explorer left Petropavlovsk Kamchatski on 3 August and crossed the Bering Strait on 19 August reaching Murmansk on 22 September.

On 22 August 2026, vessel "PanStar Acro" became the first South Korean, and first ship of a country on Russia's Unfriendly countries list to use the passage on its journey from Busan to Felixstowe.

== Commemoration ==
In 2007, Finland issued a €10 Adolf Erik Nordenskiöld and Northeast Passage commemorative coin to celebrate the 175th anniversary of Nordenskiöld's birth and his discovery of the northern sea route. The obverse features an abstract portrait of Nordenskiöld at the helm of his ship. The reverse is dominated by a pattern resembling the labyrinth formed by adjacent ice floes. The coin is one of the Europa Coins 2007 series, which celebrates European achievements in history.
