= Hugh Willoughby =

English polar explorer (died 1554)

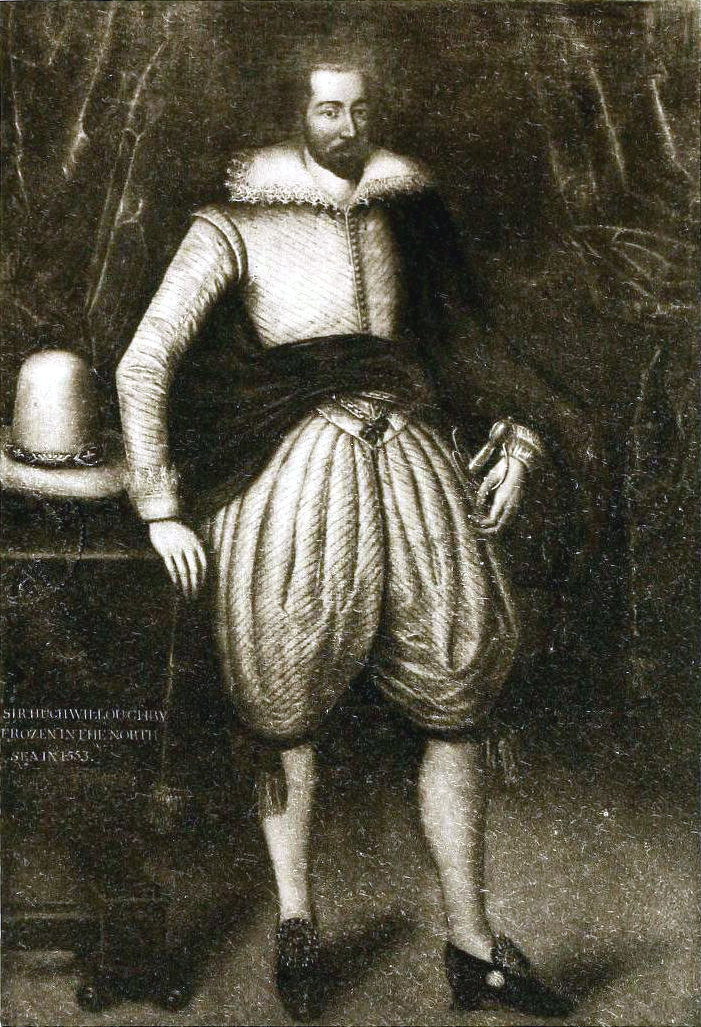
Willoughby in a posthumous portrait

Sir Hugh Willoughby (fl. 1544; died 1554) was an English soldier and an early Arctic voyager. He served in the court of Henry VIII and fought in the Scottish campaign where he was knighted for his valour. In 1553, he was selected by a company of London merchants to lead a fleet of three vessels in search of a Northeast Passage.

Willoughby and the crews of two ships died on the voyage while the third vessel Edward Bonaventure, under the command of Richard Chancellor, went on to open a successful, long-lasting trading arrangement with Russia.

== Biography ==
Willoughby was the third and youngest son of Sir Henry Willoughby of Middleton, Warwickshire, a wealthy and influential gentleman who served in the courts of Richard III and Henry VII and was knighted by Henry VII following the Battle of Stoke Field in 1487.

Hugh Willoughby served various roles in the court of Henry VIII and then joined the military to serve as a captain in the Scottish campaign of 1544. He was knighted at Leith by Edward Seymour, 1st Duke of Somerset, then Earl of Hertford. In February 1548 he was sent with Thomas Carlisle and 50 horsemen by Grey of Wilton to capture "Billie tower". He became commander of the fort on the site of Thirlestane Castle and served there until 1550, successfully withstanding a siege by the Scots and the French. In 1551 he was again campaigning in the border country and eastern marches. The downfall and execution of Somerset in 1552 affected Willoughby's standing and caused him to look for other opportunities.

In 1553, a company of London merchants and courtiers were financing a voyage of exploration and trade. Organized by Sebastian Cabot, they hoped to find a northeast sea route to the Far East. Initially called the Company of Merchant Adventurers to New Lands, the trade organization became better known as the Muscovy Company. Willoughby petitioned to lead this expedition and although he lacked significant maritime experience, he was selected based on his distinguished family and his "singular skill in the services of war." According to Terence Armstrong, it "seems a very reasonable possibility" that the 1496 voyage of Grigory Istoma influenced their planning.

Three new vessels were constructed specifically for the voyage; on one ship the keel was lined with lead in hopes of preventing attack by shipworms. The fleet was well-provisioned for a lengthy voyage and an experienced crew was selected. On 10 May 1553, Willoughby set sail on the Bona Esperanza as captain-general of the fleet with two other vessels, the Edward Bonaventura and the Bona Confidentia, under his command. His chief pilot, Richard Chancellor, sailed on the Edward, captained by Stephen Borough. They left London with great fanfare and travelled slowly down the Thames, pausing at Greenwich to fire an artillery salute for the young King Edward.

== Disappearance ==
They were seriously delayed by unfavourable winds, only reaching the coast of Norway on 14 July, more than two months after leaving London. The ships were careful to stay together and agreed that if they were separated, they would rendezvous at Vardøhus Fortress, a small fortified outpost on the Norwegian island of Vardøya in the town of Vardø. On 30 July, they were beset by storms and "terrible whirlwinds" probably in the vicinity of the North Cape. Willoughby and one other ship, the Bona Confidentia, became separated from Chancellor on the Edward. The Edward sailed to Wardhouse as agreed and waited for seven days but the other two ships never appeared. Setting out again to resume their eastward journey, Chancellor found the entrance to the White Sea and moored at the mouth of the Dvina River near the convent of St. Nicholas at Nyonoksa from where the first Russian czar Ivan IV obtained salt for Russia. From there he was summoned to Moscow and Ivan the Terrible's Court, where he negotiated an agreement opening trade with Russia through the northern ports that lasted three hundred years.

Willoughby and his crew were never seen alive again, but the events following their separation can be pieced together from Willoughby's journal which was later recovered. The storm had blown them far from the coast and without any landmarks they became disoriented. Willoughby attempted to reach Wardhouse, but their maps were misleading, compass readings were unreliable, and the weather was too overcast to measure latitude. For two weeks the ships sailed eastward until they encountered an uninhabited shoreline that was teeming with ducks and other birds. It was likely a part of the south island of Novaya Zemlya which came to be known to the Russians as Gusinaya Zemlya (Goose Land). They turned back and headed west, coasting along Kolguev Island and just missing the entrance to the White Sea where Chancellor had already landed. As the weather became colder and sea ice began to form they decided to winter in a bay formed by the Varzina River on the coast of the Kola Peninsula. Searches were made in three directions, but no settlements were discovered.

== Aftermath ==
No one survived the winter; the two ships with the bodies of the crews, including Willoughby and his journal, were found by Russian fishermen the following spring. For many years it was assumed that they died from some combination of starvation and bitter cold. More recently it has been suggested that the crew were killed by carbon monoxide poisoning, resulting from a decision to insulate their ship and block their stove chimney to fight the Arctic cold.

The discovery was quickly reported back to the tsar in Moscow who ordered the ships secured and transferred to the White Sea to await recovery by the English. It was not until 1556 that crews were sent to Russia to sail the ships back to London. It was claimed that Willoughby's body was put on board for transport home. After leaving St. Nicholas on 20 July 1556, the two ships made it as far as the west coast of Norway when they encountered a storm that sank them both. Willoughby's journal did make it back to England safely on another ship.

During the voyage, Willoughby thought he saw islands to the north. Based on his description, these were subsequently depicted on maps as Willoughby's Land and Macsinof or Matsyn Island.

In the 1590s, William Barents tried the same Northeast Passage, also became icebound near Novaya Zemlya, and also died, but some of his crew returned home and Barents Sea was named for him.

== See also ==
- List of people who disappeared mysteriously at sea
- Nesbit Willoughby
- Risley Hall
