= BBC (disambiguation) =

BBC is the British Broadcasting Corporation, a British public service broadcaster.

BBC or bbc may also refer to:

== Organisations ==
=== Broadcasting ===
==== British Broadcasting Corporation ====
- BBC Radio, an operational business division and service of the BBC
- BBC News (disambiguation), various BBC services
- BBC Three (disambiguation), various BBC services
- BBC Television, a television service of the BBC
- British Broadcasting Company (1922–1926), the BBC's commercial predecessor
- BBC America, an American television channel
- BBC Canada, a Canadian television channel
- BBC World Service, an international broadcaster owned and operated by the BBC

==== Other uses in broadcasting ====
- Banahaw Broadcasting Corporation, a defunct Philippine television network
- Biwako Broadcasting, a Japanese television station
- Hanguk-FM, a defunct South Korean radio station

=== Companies ===
- Bangkok Bank of Commerce, a collapsed Thai bank
- BBC Chartering, a shipping company
- BBC Hardware, a former Australian hardware chain
- Billionaire Boys Club, a former Californian investment group and Ponzi scheme
- Billionaire Boys Club (clothing retailer), a fashion label
- Brown, Boveri & Cie, a former Swiss power/automation company
- Bogotá Beer Company, Colombia; see Beer in Colombia
- Biman Bangladesh Airlines, the flag carrier of Bangladesh (ICAO airline code: BBC)

=== Education ===
- Bhiwani Boxing Club, India
- Biscayne Bay Campus, of Florida International University, North Miami, Florida, US
- Boise Bible College, Idaho, US
- Brisbane Boys' College, Australia

=== Other organisations ===
- BBC Monthey, a Swiss basketball team
- Biplobi Bangla Congress, an Indian political party in West Bengal
- Blades Business Crew, a football hooligan gang in England
- B'nai Brith Canada, a Canadian Jewish service and advocacy organization
- Bumblebee Conservation Trust, a British charity
- Russian Air Force, abbreviated as ВВС in Cyrillic

== Computing ==
- BBC Micro, a 1980s home computer
  - BBC BASIC, a programming language
- BBCode, a message board markup language
- Bootable business card, a card-shaped CD-ROM

== Other uses ==
- Bell Beaker culture, an archaeological culture in Europe
- Bromobenzyl cyanide, a phased out persisting lachrymatory agent
- British-born Chinese, ethnic Chinese who were born in the UK
- Bukit Brown Cemetery, a cemetery in Singapore
- Bay City Regional Airport which has the IATA code BBC
- "BBC", a song by Ming Tea
- "BBC", a song on the Jay-Z album Magna Carta Holy Grail
- "BBC", a Real Madrid attacking trio consisting of Gareth Bale, Karim Benzema, and Cristiano Ronaldo
- "BBC", a Juventus defensive trio consisting of Andrea Barzagli, Leonardo Bonucci, and Giorgio Chiellini
- B. B. See, pronounced as BBC, a character in The Noose (TV series)
- BBC (sexual slang), an initialism for big black cock
- Chevrolet big-block engine, an American V-8 car engine
- Toba Batak language (ISO 639-3 code: bbc)
