= BBC2 (disambiguation) =

BBC Two of the British Broadcasting Corporation is a television network in the United Kingdom.

BBC2 may also refer to:

- Banahaw Broadcasting Corporation or BBC2 in the Philippines.
- BBC Radio 2, British radio station of the British Broadcasting Corporation
- BBC II! (BBC Three Online), a British online service operating between the closure and revival of the BBC Three channel

== See also ==
- BBC (disambiguation)
