= BBC3 (disambiguation) =

BBC Three is a British television channel which broadcast from 9 February 2003 to 16 February 2016 but returned on 1 February 2022.

BBC3 or BBC Three, or similar, may also refer to:

== British Broadcasting Corporation ==
- Related to the former (then relaunched) British television channel:
  - BBC Three (streaming service), an internet channel launched in 2016
- Fictitious or hypothetical third BBC TV channels:
  - BBC-3 (TV series), 1960s TV series
  - BBC3, a fictional TV channel in the 1971 Doctor Who serial The Daemons
  - BBC3, temporary channel identity adopted by BBC1 for broadcasts of puppet character Roland Rat's 1980s BBC series
- Similarly named BBC radio channels:
  - BBC Radio 3, a national BBC radio station, broadcast throughout the United Kingdom
  - BBC Three Counties Radio (3CR), a BBC local radio station broadcasting in Bedfordshire, Buckinghamshire and Hertfordshire

== Other uses ==
- Biwako Broadcasting Co., a television station (UHF channel 20 - LCN 3) licensed to Shiga Prefecture, Japan
- P53 upregulated modulator of apoptosis, also known by the name Bcl-2-binding component 3 (BBC3), a biological signalling protein
- 믄 (U+BBC3), a unicode character; see List of modern Hangul characters in ISO/IEC 2022–compliant national character set standards

== See also ==
- BBC (disambiguation)
