= Beluga Fraternity =

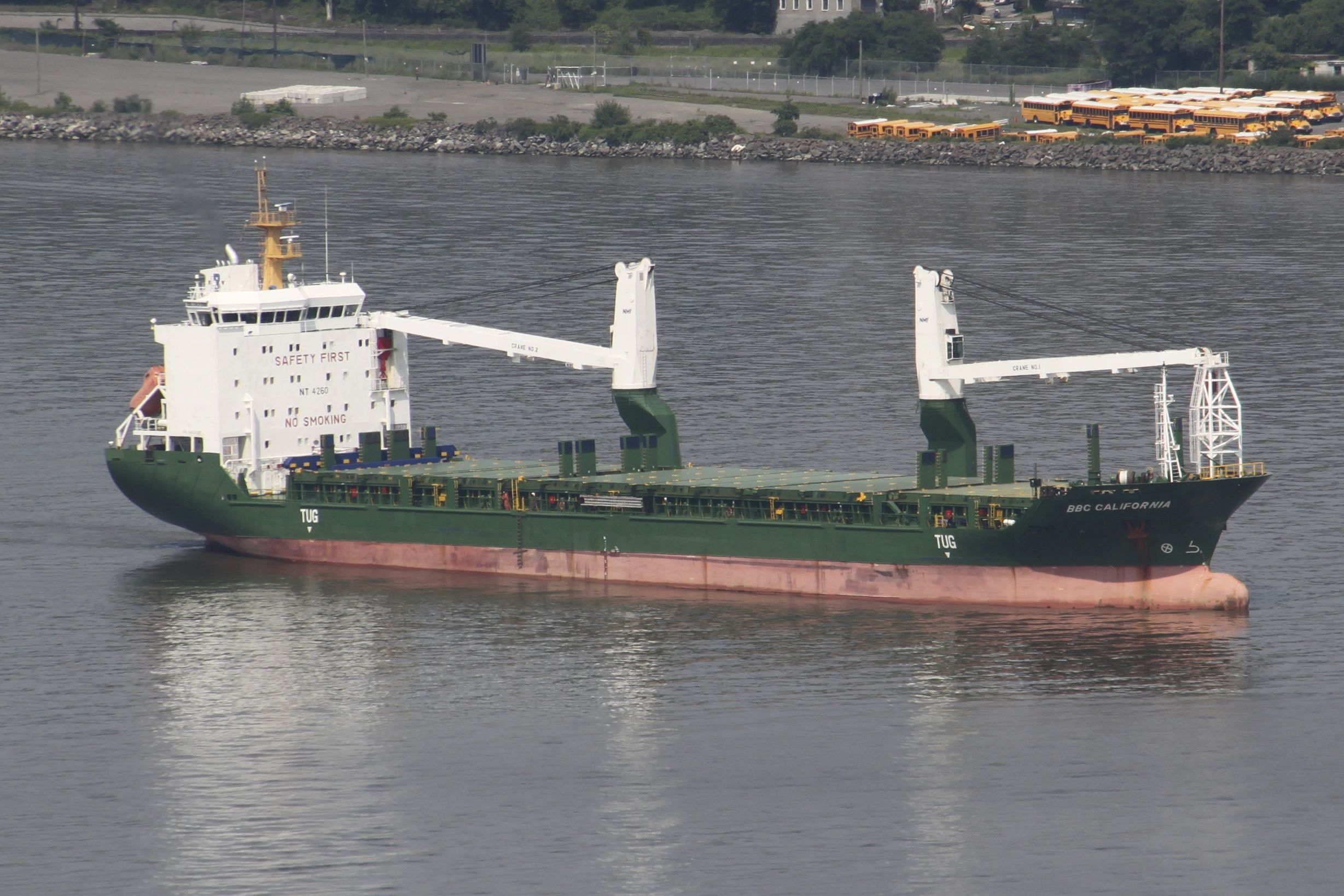
- BBC California on the Hudson River in 2015

History
- Name: BBC California (2011–); Fraternity (2011); Beluga Fraternity (2008–2011)
- Operator: Beluga Shipping GmbH
- Port of registry: St. John's, Antigua and Barbuda
- Builder: CSC Jiangdong Shipyard, Wuhu, People's Republic of China
- Yard number: JD12000-8
- Laid down: 28 April 2007
- Launched: 18 August 2007
- Completed: 28 February 2008
- Identification: IMO number: 9402055; Call sign: V2DD6; MMSI number: 305177000
- Status: In service

General characteristics
- Type: General cargo ship
- Tonnage: 9,611 GT; 4,260 NT; 12,672 DWT
- Length: 138.05 m (452 ft 11 in)
- Beam: 21.0 m (68 ft 11 in)
- Draft: 8.0 m (26 ft 3 in)
- Depth: 11.0 m (36 ft 1 in)
- Ice class: GL E3
- Installed power: Caterpillar 6M43C (5,400 kW)
- Propulsion: Single shaft; controllable-pitch propeller; Bow thruster (500 kW)
- Speed: 15 knots (28 km/h; 17 mph)
- Capacity: 665 TEU

BBC California, before 2011 known as Beluga Fraternity and briefly Fraternity, is a German general cargo ship owned by Beluga Shipping. In 2009 she and her sister ship, Beluga Foresight, transited the Northern Sea Route while carrying power plant components from Ulsan, South Korea, to the Russian port of Vladivostok. The voyage was widely covered and sometimes incorrectly said to be the first time when non-Russian ships make the transit. In 1997, a Finnish oil tanker, Uikku, sailed the length of the Northern Sea Route from Murmansk to the Bering Strait, becoming the first Western ship to complete the voyage.
