= Transpolar Sea Route =

Potential shipping route in the Arctic

The Transpolar Sea Route (yellow), Northwest Passage (green) and Northeast Passage (magenta)

The Transpolar Sea Route (TSR) is a future Arctic shipping route running from the Atlantic Ocean to the Pacific Ocean across the center of the Arctic Ocean.

The route is also sometimes called Trans-Arctic Route. In contrast to the Northeast Passage (including the Northern Sea Route) and the Northwest Passage it largely avoids the territorial waters of Arctic states and lies in international high seas. The route is currently only navigable by heavy icebreakers. However, due to the increasing decline of Arctic sea ice extent, the route is expected to become more viable in the future.

The TSR is about 3,900 kilometres (2,100 nmi) long and offers significant distance savings between Europe and Asia. It is the shortest of the Arctic shipping routes. In contrast to the Northern Sea Route and the Northwest Passage, which are both coastal routes, the TSR is a mid-ocean route and passes close to the North Pole. Due to high seasonal variability of ice conditions throughout the entire Arctic basin, the TSR will not exist as one fixed shipping lane, but will follow a number of navigational routes.

The TSR passes outside the exclusive economic zones of Arctic coastal states making it of special geopolitical importance to countries looking towards the Arctic as a future trade route. While a number of legal disagreement and uncertainties revolve around both the Northwest Passage and the Northern Sea Route, the TSR lies outside the territorial jurisdiction of any state. The Chinese icebreaker Xue Long was one of the first major vessels to utilize the route during its 2012 journey through the Arctic Ocean.

In 2019, the German company Bremenports announced it had entered into a contract to build the Finnafjord Port in Iceland which would cater to trans-arctic shipping.
