= Teerhof =

Peninsula between the River Weser and the Kleine Weser in Germany

Coordinates: 53°4′35″N 8°47′56″E

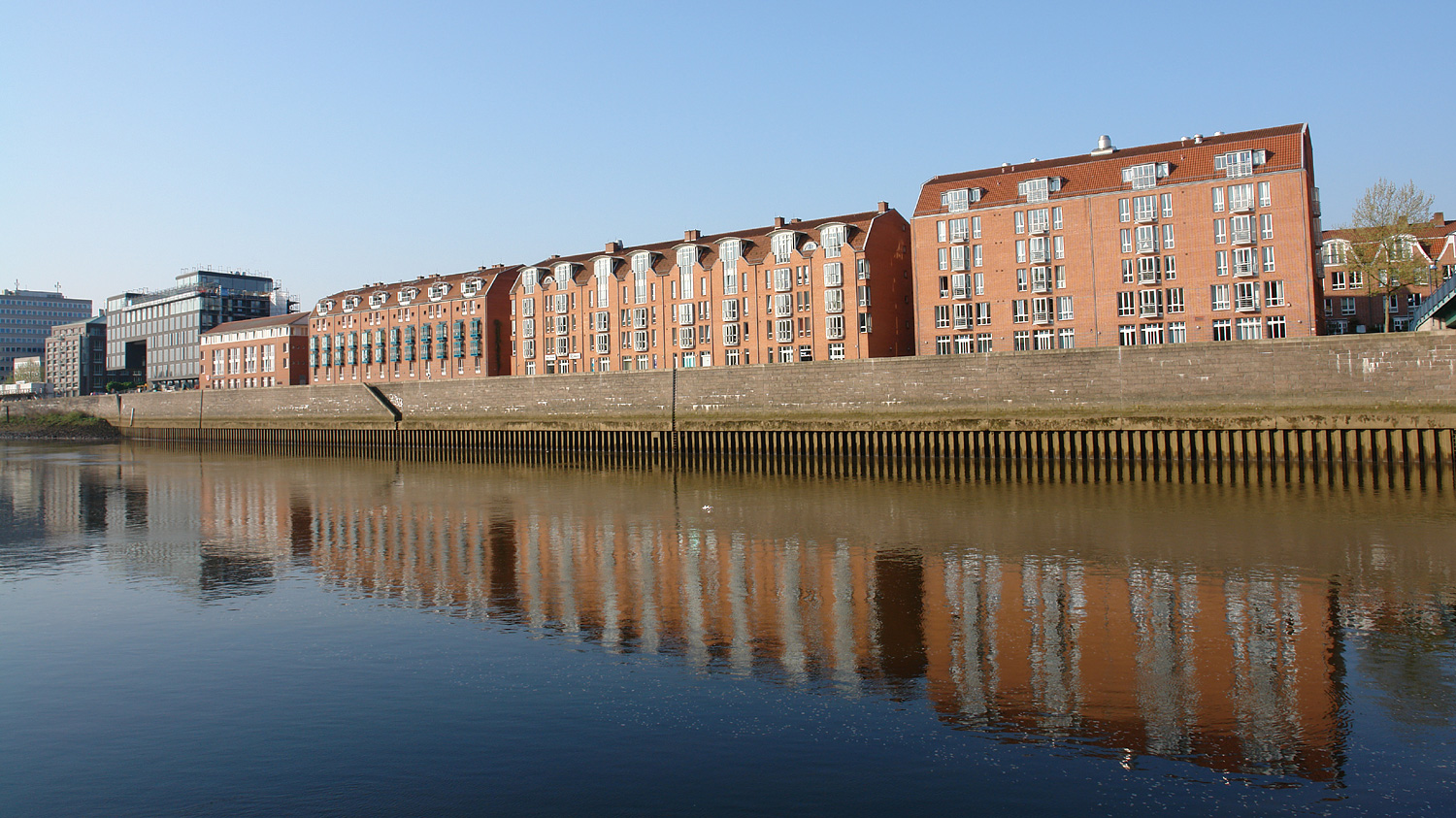
Buildings on the west side of the Teerhof

The Teerhof is a peninsula between the River Weser and the Kleine Weser, opposite the city centre of Bremen, Germany. It was first mentioned in 1624 as "Theerhof" when it was the northernmost part of an island. Today it consists mainly of residential buildings and the Weserburg modern art museum.

== History ==
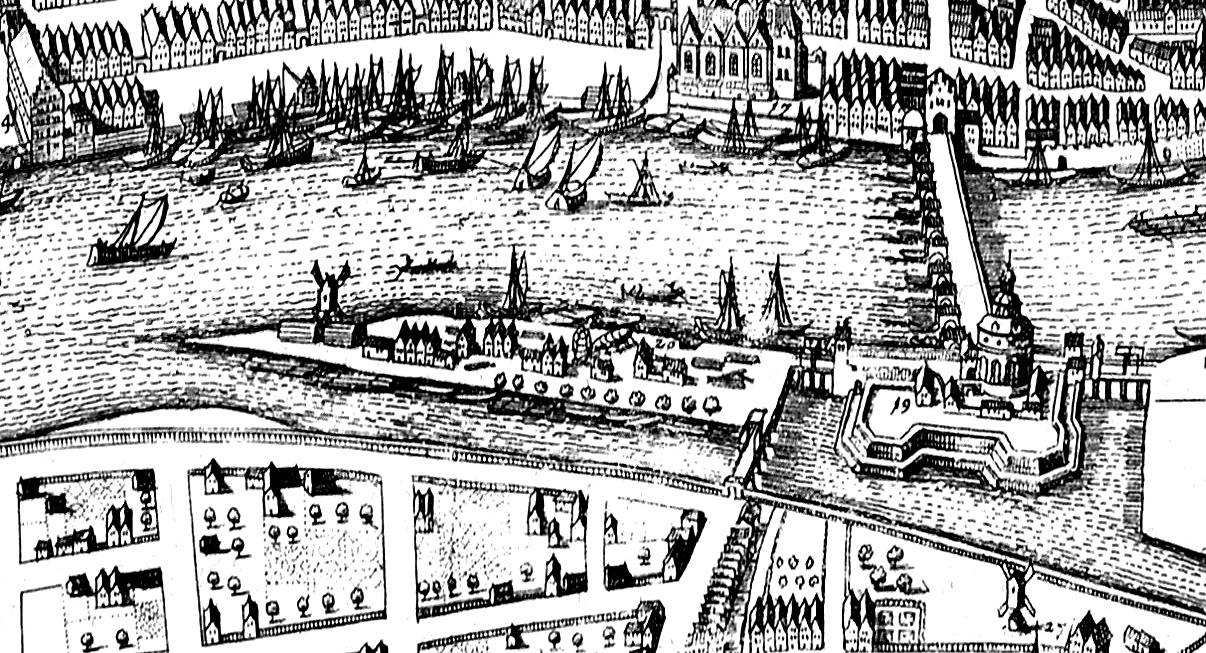
The Teerhof c. 1640

The name Teerhof means "tarring yard" as it was here ship hulls and ropes were once tarred for the local shipyard. Up to the end of the 19th century, mixed industrial and residential developments led to a widely varying collection of buildings. By the 1930s, the Teerhof was made up of storehouses, small production facilities, a coffee factory and housing. All the buildings were almost completely destroyed during the Second World War. The Weserburg coffee factory which was also seriously damaged was repaired and reopened in 1949. When it closed in 1973, the building was sold to the city and was used for various cultural events including artists' ateliers and art exhibitions, until it was decided it should become a collectors' museum.

In 1967, a tall insurance building was built on the southeastern section of the peninsula. In 1977, after decades of neglect the Danish architects firm Dissing & Weitling were charged to develop the area. In 1992, rows of three to seven storey red-brick apartment buildings were completed in a style resembling that of the old storehouses. The Weserburg Museum opened in September 1991 as a collectors' museum, the first of its kind in Europe. Its name was changed to "Weserburg | Museum of Modern Art" in 2007. There are currently plans (2014) to extend the museum which will now remain permanently on the peninsula.

A pedestrian bridge to the Schlachte was completed in 1992. Built in 1994, Bremen University's Gästehaus Teerhof overlooking the river has 17 double apartments and six singles as well as a meeting room for 50 people. More recently (c. 2009), an office building for Beluga Shipping Gmbh (now bankrupt) was constructed on the peninsula.

== Gallery ==
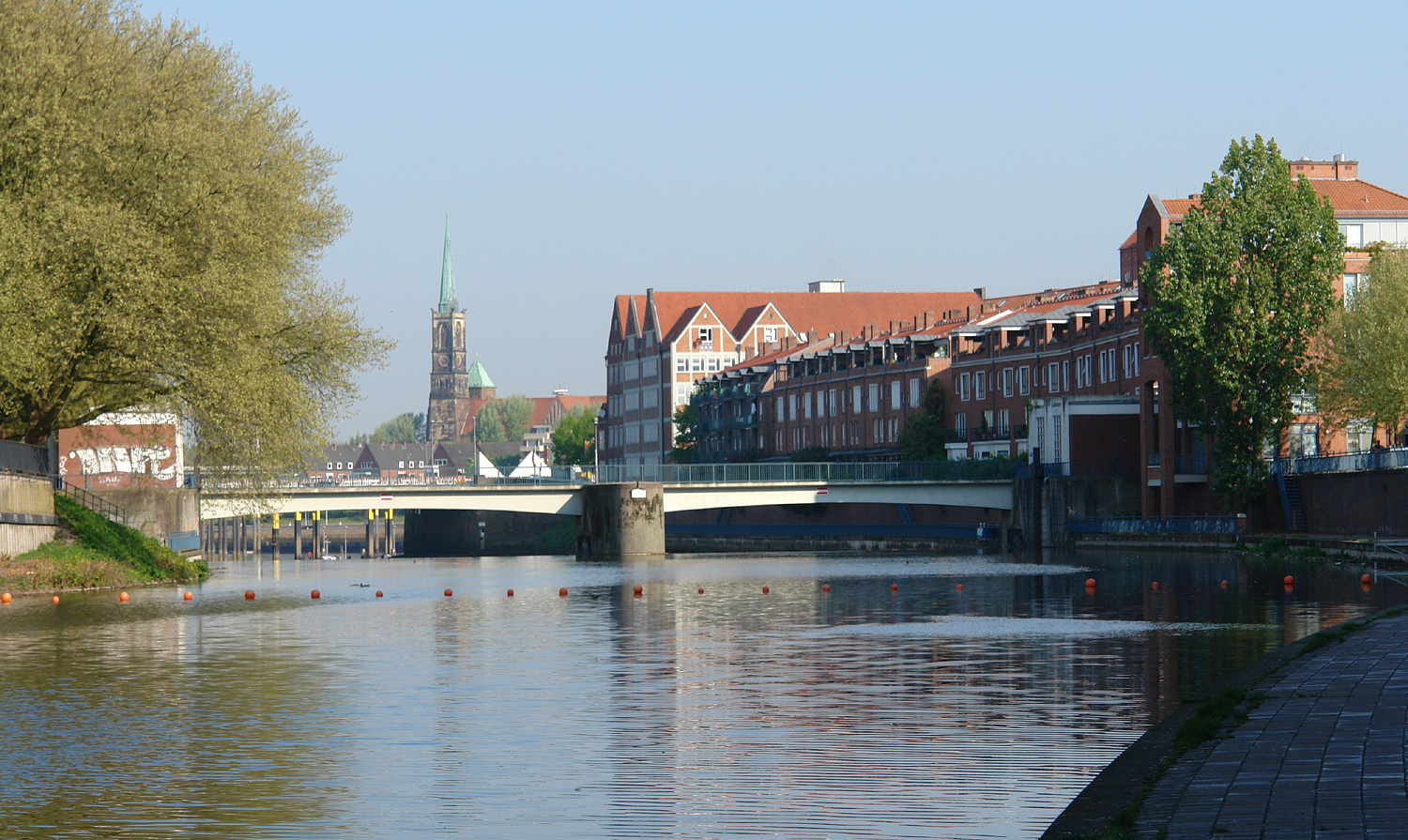
From the west with the Kleine Weser

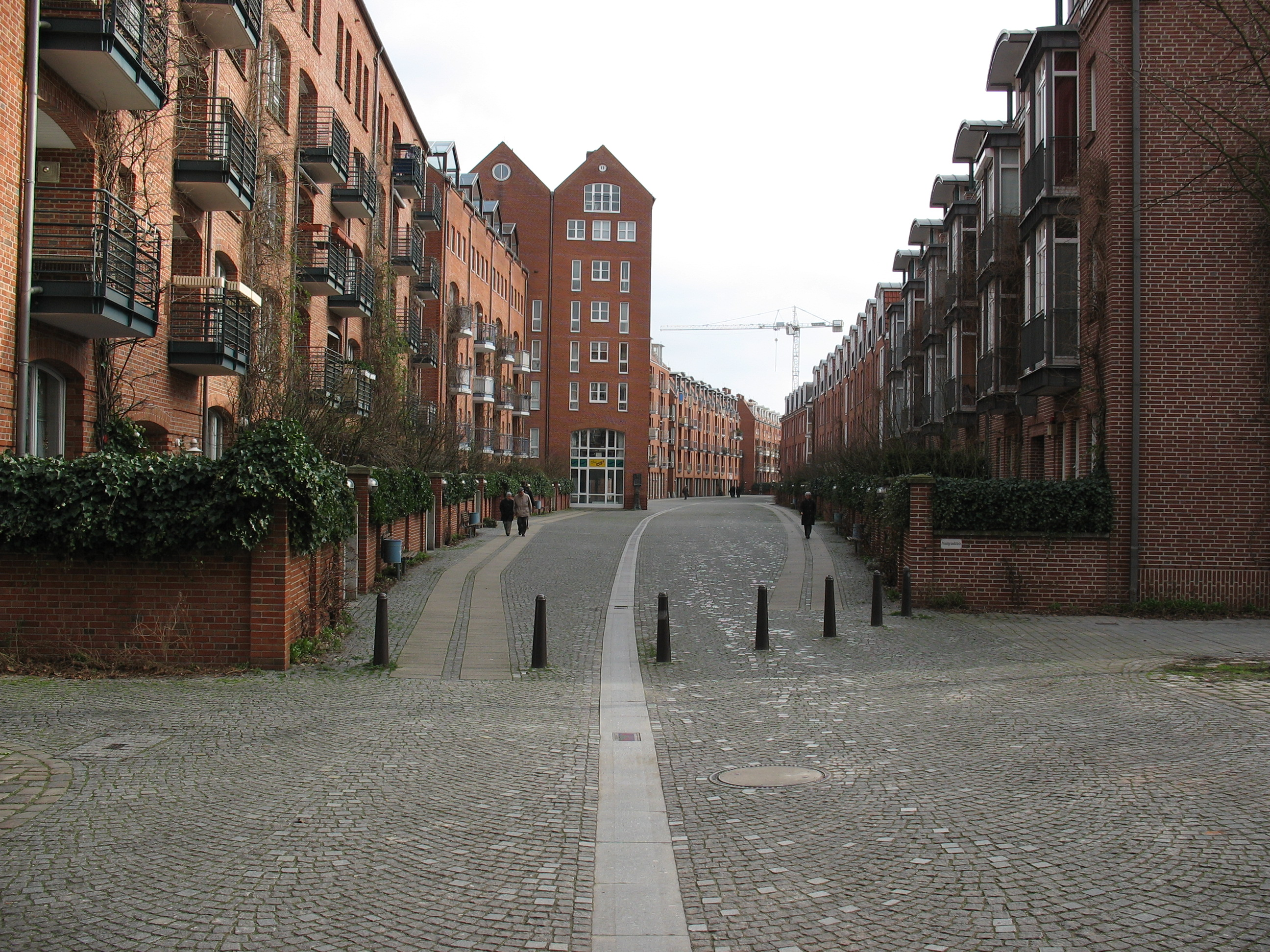
Apartment buildings

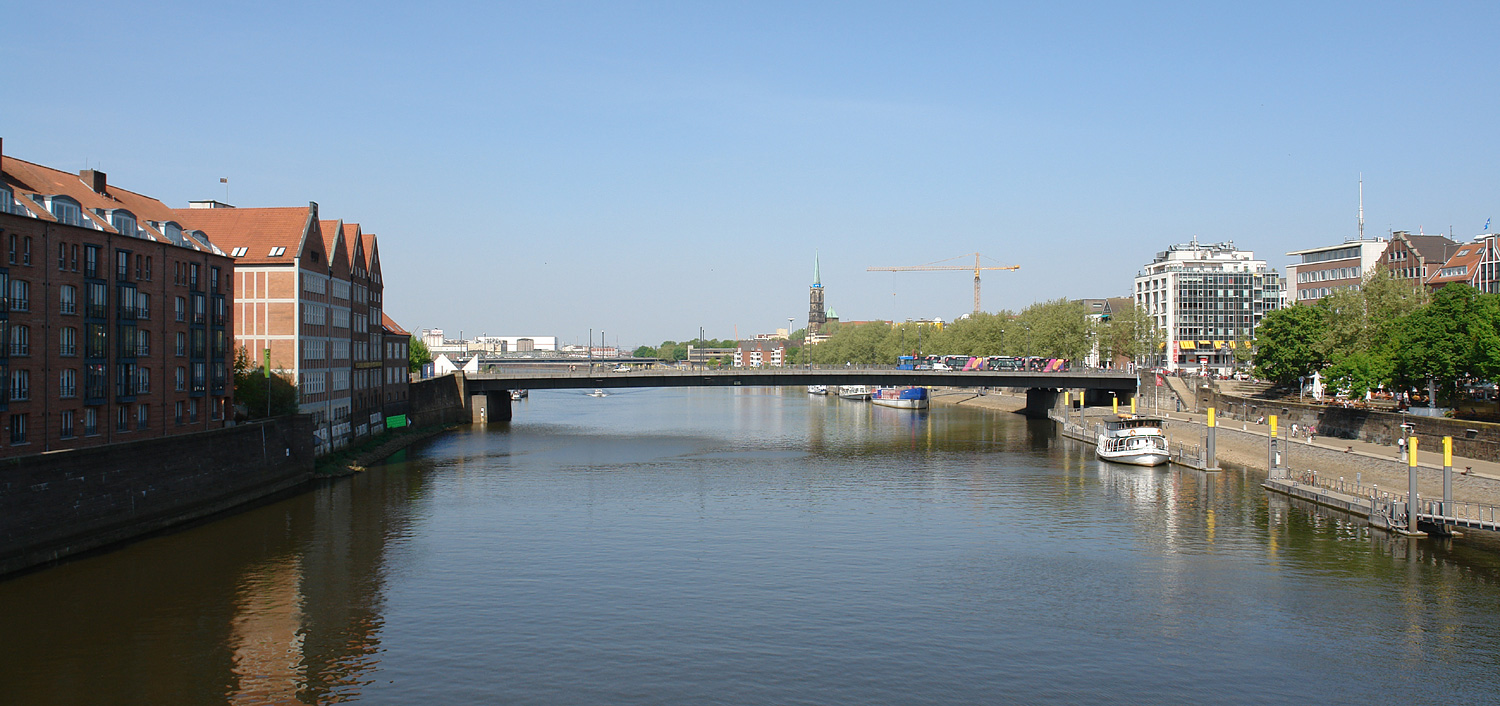
Pedestrian bridge from the Teerhof (left) to the Schlachte

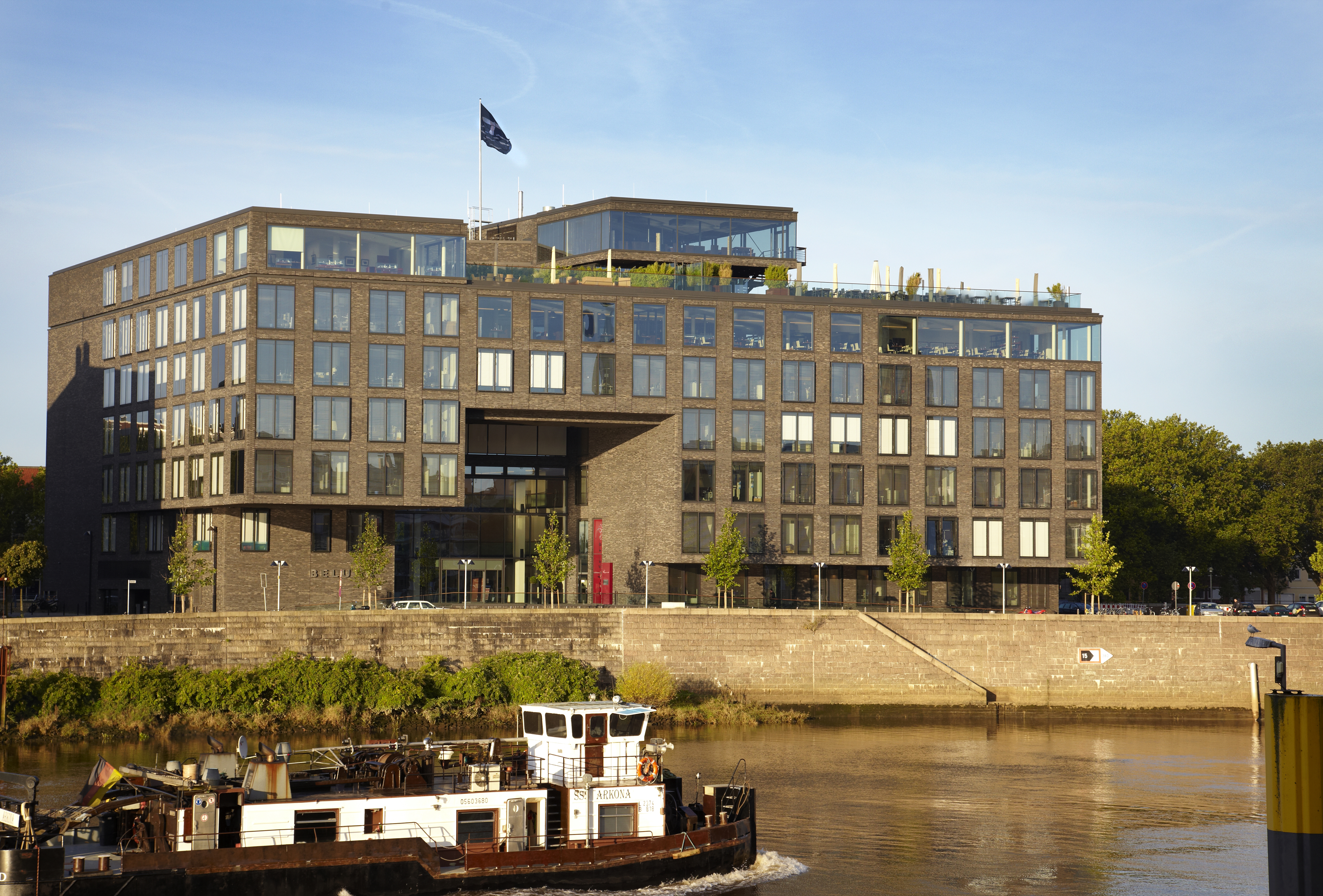
The Beluga building

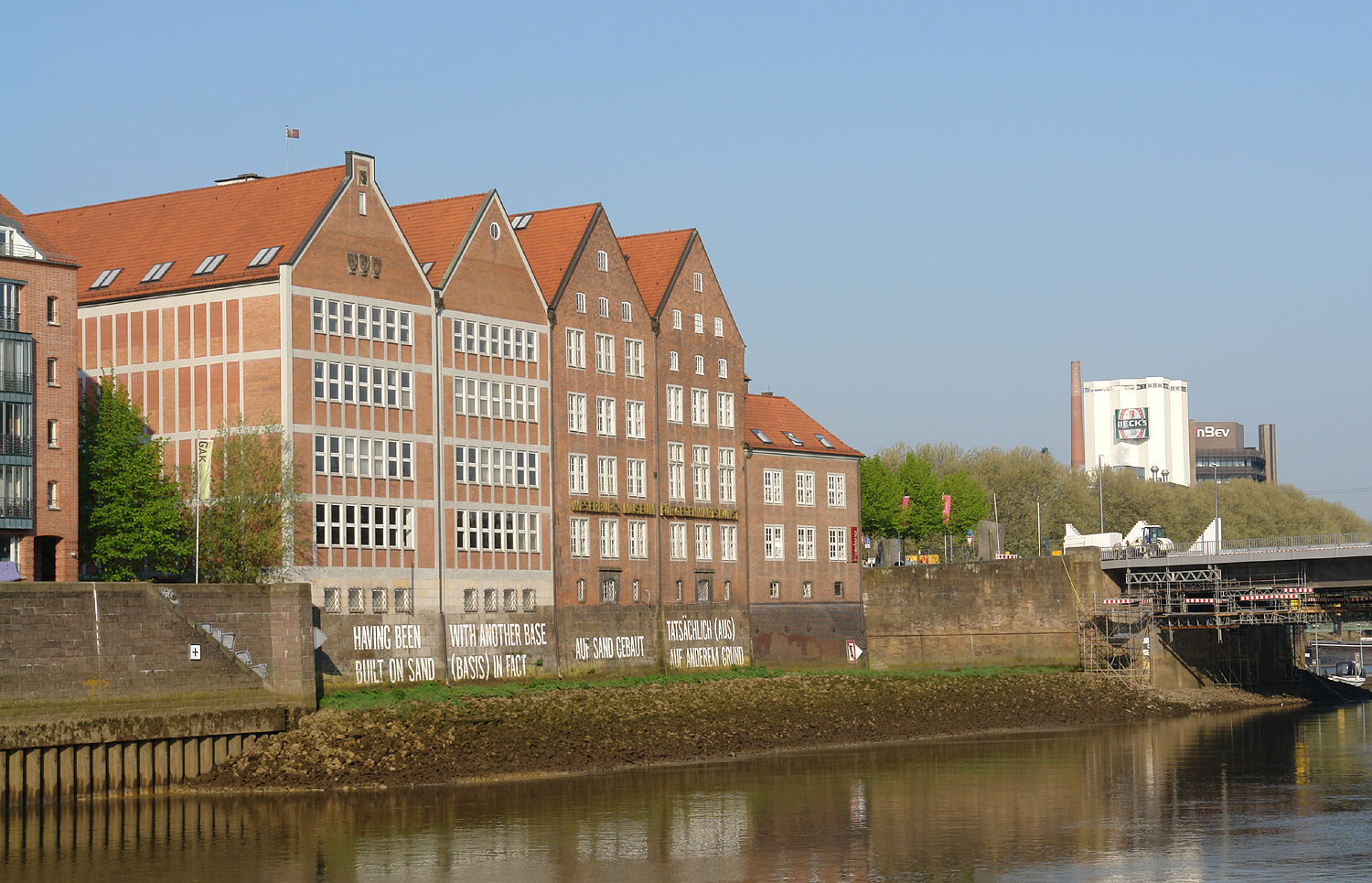
The Weserburg museum

== Literature ==
- Christoph Dette, Anke Grossmann, Ruprecht Grossmann: Der Teerhof in Bremen. Bremens Insel zwischen Altstadt und Neustadt. Hauschild, Bremen 1995, ISBN 3-929902-88-5. (in German)
