= BBC Chartering =

German international shipping company

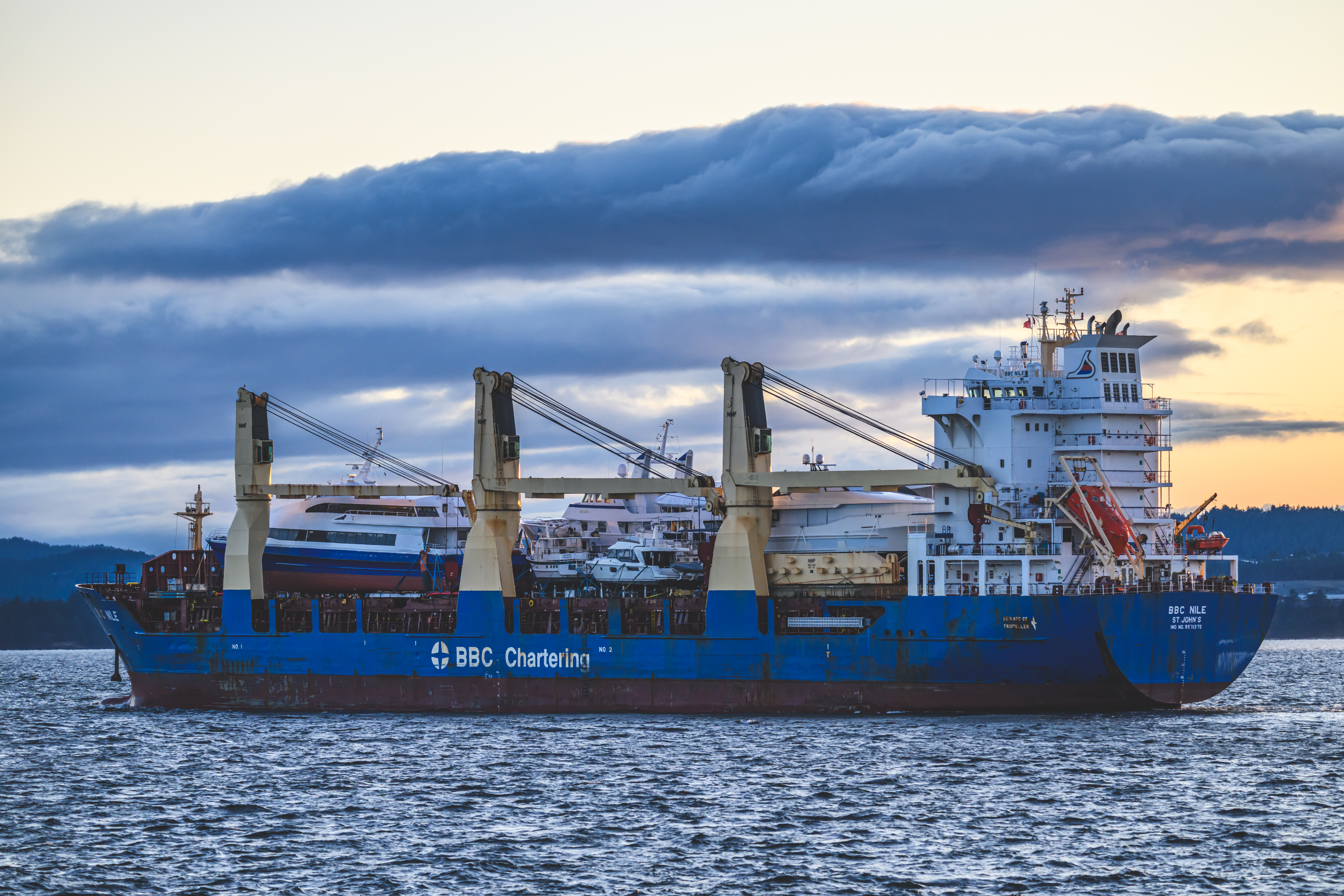
- BBC Nile off Ogden Point, BC Canada
- Trade name: BBC Chartering GmbH & Co. KG
- Industry: International shipping
- Founded: 1997 in Bremen, Germany
- Headquarters: Leer, Germany
- Number of locations: 30 (2015)
- Area served: Global
- Key people: Wilke Briese, Ulrich Ulrichs (CEO), Enno Jelken (CFO)
- Parent: Briese Schiffahrt Group
- Website: http://www.bbc-chartering.com

BBC Chartering GmbH, owned by the Briese Schiffahrt Group, is an international shipping company based in Leer, Germany. The company operates a fleet of over 160 vessels, including multipurpose ships, heavy-lift vessels, container ships, bulk carriers, and RoRos, making it the largest, multipurpose, chartering company on the Ems River. BBC Chartering is recognised as one of the leading companies in the global market for heavy-lift and project shipping, based on tonnage.

The company concentrates on specialised marine transport including bulk and neobulk cargo, steel products, and freight related to the energy sector, such as components for wind turbines. It also handles various types of freight, including hazardous materials, contatiners, and military cargo within the project shipping sector. The company motto is "Anchored by Excellence".

The company has more than 400 employees in 30 offices worldwide.

== History ==
The family-owned company, BBC Chartering (BBC), was established in 1997 by Roelf Briese and Bruno Bischoff with its office in Bremen, Germany. Two years later, the headquarters was moved to Leer, Germany. In the same year, the shipping company opened its first South American branch in Buenos Aires. Subsequent offices were opened in Argentina and Houston, Texas, and operations expanded into Europe, Asia and America.

In October 2003, the company experienced an incident involving the sinking of a multi-purpose freighter BBC China off the coast of South Africa. The following year, the Singapore office was established when the company launched Asia Project Chartering (APC)- an alliance formed through a joint venture with Clipper Projects.

Expansion continued in 2008 with the establishment of an office in the United States and the introduction of regular connections to the Persian Gulf. In 2010, the company opened an office in Japan and added the BBC Bulk Division to its operations portfolio. It also merged with Teras Cargo Transport to form Teras BBC Chartering LLC.

In 2011, the company significantly increased its fleet through the acquisition of ships previously managed by Beluga Shipping and opened additional offices in Asia and other regions to support the growth.

By the end of 2013, one-third of the BBC Chartering fleet had a lifting capacity of 500 tonnes or more, solidifying the company's position in the heavy-lift sector. In 2015, BBC Chartering launched its apac (any port, any cargo) service to support its global operations. By 2016, the company operated over 180 multipurpose and heavy-lift vessels, becoming the largest fleet of its type worldwide.

The company has also developed its liner services and participates in alliances such as CaytransBBC and TerrasBBC. It currently manages 18 liner services through 26 branches across five continents.

As of 2019, the company operates 30 global offices with main hubs in Leer, Houston, and Singapore.

== Cargo ==
BBC Chartering operates with a cargo-oriented structure, divided into three interconnected areas:

1. Tramp and Liner Shipping: This includes traditional shipping, liner services, and the hybrid apac service, which bridges the two.
2. Contracts of Affreightment (COA): This area manages cargo shipments based on long-term contracts, organising transport for recurring freight needs.
3. Special Projects: This division handles transport requirements that do not fit into the tramp or liner shipping categories, focusing on unique and complex logistics needs.

A significant portion of the cargo handled by BBC Chartering consists of project and heavy-lift cargo, including large and specialised items such as turbines and construction equipment. Additionally, a notable share of the total cargo volume includes bulk and containerised goods. The company is internally organised into various business and cargo divisions to manage these operations effectively:

- Project Division: Focused on heavy-lift cargo transported on global routes, considered the core of the company's operations
- Liner Services: Manages various liner service routes
- Oil and Gas: Handles cargo for the oil and gas industry, including pipeline systems, primarily from the Middle East, Siberia, and North America
- Green Energy: Specialises in renewable energy cargo, particularly wind turbines, with shipments from Europe to over 50 countries. The company claims to be the largest transporter of wind turbines globally
- Heavy Industry: Transports heavy equipment such as cranes and excavators worldwide
- Mining Industry: Focuses on the transport of mining equipment, including trucks and excavators
- Vehicles and Yachts: Manages the transport of various types of vehicles and yachts
- Bulk Cargo: Transports bulk cargo goods using bulk carriers and multipurpose freighters

== Fleet ==
As of 2017, BBC Chartering's fleet consists of approximately 170 chartered vessels, with an average age of 15 years, including multipurpose vessels, heavy-lift ships, container ships, and bulk carriers, ranging in size from 3,500 to 37,000 dot. Depending on the class of ship, the crane capacity of the fleet extends up to a maximum unit weight of 800 tonnes, with the Palabora featuring a capacity up to 900 tonnes.

BBC Chartering does not own its vessels, but charters them, primarily from its parent company, Briese Group, as well as other operators, such as W. Bockstiegel. While the technical and operational aspects - such as management, manning, and inspections - are handled by the vessel owners - BBC Chartering is responsible for the commercial management of the fleet, including matching cargo with suitable vessels under appropriate terms.

The fleet has an average age of 8.5 years (as of 2017), with over 100 vessels built in the 2000s, 60 of them between 2007 and 2009, and a further 70 built in the 2010s, 66 of which were constructed between 2010 and 2012. The fleet is designed for flexibility: most vessels are equipped with cranes, eliminating dependence on port infrastructure, and many are rated with high ice classes, enabling operations in icy waters such as the Baltic Sea during winter.

Since 2010, BBC Chartering has added long-term charters of multipurpose heavy-lift carriers, including vessels from the BBC Everest class (700-tonne lifting capacity) and the BBC Amber class (800-tonne lifting capacity).

In 2024, BBC Chartering began the expansion of its fleet with the introduction of 15 new LakerMax heavy-lift, 13,000dwt multipurpose vessels. The first of the 15 new builds, MV BBC Leer, was received by Briese Group in May 2024. The second, BBC Houston, was christened in September 2024.

== Operations ==
BBC chartering has been involved in many areas of shipping, including:

- Resupply missions for US Antarctic bases.
- Transportation of the radio telescope antennas used for in the Atacama Large Millimeter Array.
- Transport of turbines during construction of the Greater Gabbard Wind Farm.
- Bulk transport, including grain, and fertilizer.

== Liner Services ==
In addition to its traditional tramp shipping operations, which account for approximately two-thirds of its fleet, BBC Chartering also offers semi-liner services. Some of these services operate on regular schedules and are marketed as liner services, managed by dedicated line managers. Many routes connect industrialised countries with emerging and developing nations, reflecting the high demand for large finished products such as generators, turbines, machinery, and power plant components. Most of these routes are serviced on a monthly or bi-weekly basis.

== apac Service ==
BBC Chartering's fleet covers all major global routes, which led to the introduction of the apac (any port, any cargo) service. This service operates as a hybrid between tramp and liner shipping, offering flexible transport for a wide variety of cargo to any destination.

Under the apac concept, cargo is loaded onto a vessel already scheduled to travel to the required destination area. While this ensures faster delivery, the specific ship carrying the cargo cannot be predetermined. The service allows for flexible departure times and optimises vessel utilisation, reducing the environmental impact by minimising the number of ships operating on the same route.

== Ship Classes and Ships ==
Name	Ship type	Year of construction	Load capacity	Length	Width	Draft	Flag	Number	Crane capacity
BBC-Amber-Class	Heavy goods freighter	2011–2013	14.360 dwt	153,44 m	23,20 m	9,10 m	Antigua & Barbuda	14 ships	2 × 400 t + 1 × 80 t
BBC-Neptune-Class	Bulker	2010–2010	37.300 dwt	189,99 m	28,50 m	10,40 m	Liberia	2 ships	4 × 30 t
BBC-Leer-Class	Multipurpose vessel	1998–2000	20.000 dwt	153,22 m	23,60 m	9,73 m	Liberia	4 ships	2 × 60 t
Norderoog-Class	Container ship	2004–2008	16.921 dwt	161,35 m	25,00 m	9,90 m	Antigua & Barbuda, Gibraltar	6 ships	2 × 45 t
BBC-Everest-Class	Heavy goods freighter	2011–2012	9.300 dwt	125,79 m	22,00 m	7,60 m	Germany, Antigua & Barbuda	9 ships	2 × 350 t
BBC-Ems-Class	Multipurpose heavy goods freighter	2006–2012	17.500 dwt	143,14 m	22,80 m	9,70 m	Germany, Antigua & Barbuda	15 ships	3 × 80 t / 2 × 250 t + 1 × 80 t
BBC-Bergen-Class	Multipurpose vessel	2011–2012	8.000 dwt	128,45 m	16,50 m	7,00 m	Antigua & Barbuda	8 ships	2 × 80 t
BBC-Europe-Class	Multipurpose heavy goods freighter	2003–2009	7.700 dwt	119,80 m	20,20 m	7,60 m	Antigua & Barbuda, Germany, USA	9 ships	2 × 250 t
BBC-Campana-Class	Multipurpose heavy goods freighter	2004–2011	12.780 dwt	138,50 m	21,00 m	8,00 m	Gibraltar, Antigua & Barbuda, Cyprus, Liberia	31 ships	2 × 120 t / 2 × 150 t / 2 × 180 t
BBC-Winter-Class	Multipurpose heavy goods freighter	2011–2012	19.800 dwt	166,25 m	22,90 m	9,80 m	Liberia	2 ships	2 × 400 t + 1 × 120 t
BBC-Rhine-Class	Multipurpose vessel	2008	17.300 dwt	142,81 m	21,50 m	9,69 m	Liberia	2 ships	3 × 60 t
HR-Recognition-Class	Multipurpose heavy goods freighter	2005	10.500 dwt	134,65 m	21,50 m	7,95 m	Liberia	2 ships	2 × 250 t
BBC-England-Class	Multipurpose vessel	2003–2004	10.250 dwt	136,74 m	28,25 m	7,33 m	Antigua & Barbuda	3 ships	2 × 80 t
BBC-Kimberly-Class	Multipurpose heavy goods freighter	2009	10.000 dwt	139,00 m	20,00 m	7,70 m	Antigua & Barbuda	2 ships	2 × 250 t
BBC-K-Class	Multipurpose RoRo heavy goods freighter	1998–2000	7.200 dwt	126,51 m	20,30 m	6,65 m	Liberia	4 ships	2 × 100 t / 2 × 150 t
BBC-Atlantic-Class	Multipurpose vessel	2005–2011	6.150 dwt	115,50 m	16,50 m	5,70 m	Antigua & Barbuda, Gibraltar	11 ships	2 × 60 t

== BBC China ==
In October 2003, two months prior to Libya's announcement that it would cease the production of weapons of mass destruction, the United States intercepted the BBC China freighter, owned by BBC Chartering in Leer. This action was based on information provided by Urs Friedrich Tinner, a Swiss-born engineer and former CIA spy. The BBC China was believed to be transporting components for the construction of uranium ultracentrifuges (GUZ) and nuclear bombs, valued at over 10 million euros, with a scheduled arrival in Libya at the beginning of October 2003. The interception was part of an intelligence operation conducted by British and American agencies, who had learned in late September 2003 that the freighter had loaded GUZ components in Dubai and was en route to Libya. The intelligence agencies informed the German government and requested assistance in stopping and diverting the ship to Italy. The German government reached out to the ship's owner, who reportedly agreed to cooperate.

After navigating through the Suez Canal, the ship set course for the Italian port of Taranto for cargo inspection. A U.S. warship trailed the freighter during this operation. It is reported that neither the crew nor the shipping company was aware that components for a gas ultracentrifuge (GUZ) had been loaded in Dubai. The cargo had been misrepresented in the shipping documents, which, according to the Süddeutsche Zeitung, originated from a company based in Asia. Nuclear specialists from British and American authorities inspected the cargo and subsequently confiscated it. Investigative journalist Rainer Kahrs revealed that the ship was owned by Beluga Shipping and chartered to BBC Chartering. Prior to the voyage, it had been renamed from Beluga Superstition to BBC China. Shortly after the intelligence operation, the ship ran aground on a rock off the coast of South Africa near Port Grosvenor at 31.3851960°S 29.9076156°E and sank.
