= BBC News (disambiguation) =

BBC News is the news-gathering operation of the BBC, and the largest news organization in the world.

BBC News may also refer to:

- BBC News (British TV channel), a 24-hour domestic channel in the United Kingdom
  - BBC News at One
  - BBC News at Six
  - BBC News at Ten
- BBC News (international TV channel), a 24-hour international news channel, formerly BBC World News
- BBC News Online, the website of BBC News
- BBC News, a radio news programme broadcast on the BBC World Service
- BBC Radio 4 News, a news programme broadcast on BBC Radio 4
