= Multi-purpose vessel =

Ship type

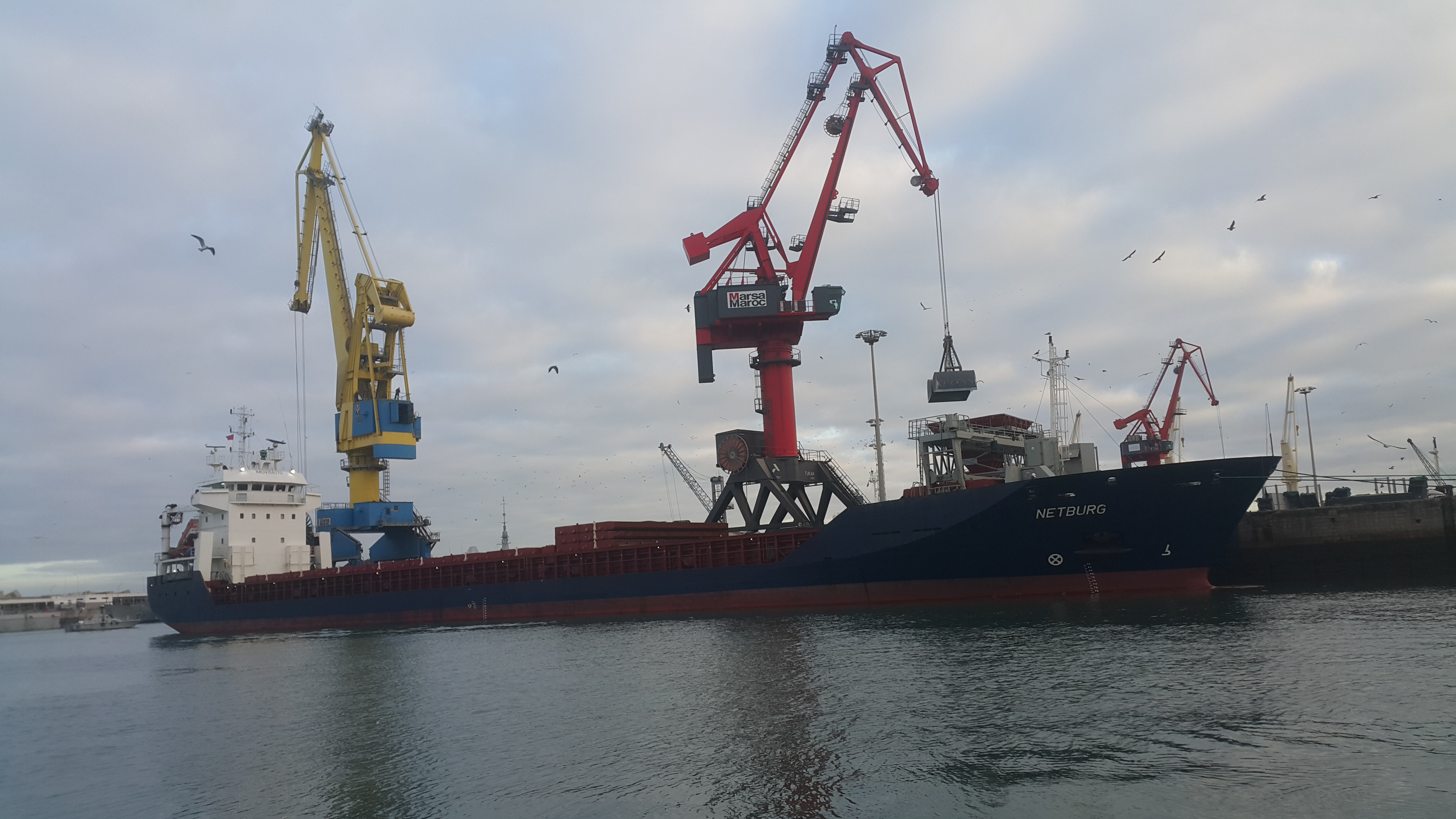
The 'NETBURG' an MPV seen in 2019

A multi-purpose vessel (MPV) is a seagoing ship that is built for the carriage of a wide range of cargoes. Examples of these cargoes are: wood, steel, building materials, rolls of paper and bulk cargo.

Multi-purpose vessels can be divided into four categories: vessels with and without cargo gear, coastal trade liners and sea-river vessels. Bigger multi-purpose vessels are able to carry different kinds of loading on the same voyage. Smaller multi-purpose vessels do not have this advantage but they are employed to get into smaller harbours because of their limited draught.

Because of their varying operating conditions, these ships have complex designs that are difficult to build. Their all-round design must be able to carry heavy loads, large objects and unitised cargo as bulk cargo. These cargoes can be rolled or lifted on board so this requires different types of loading gear, as well.

According to DNV, there are some 15,000 MPVS in existence and they range in size from small coastal vessels up to large ships with a heavy lift capability.

== See also ==
- Freight transport
