= Grigory Istoma =

Russian diplomat and clerk (died after 1526)

Grigory Istoma (Russian: Григорий Истома; died after 1526), also known as Istoma Maly (Russian: Истома Малый, lit. 'Istoma the Small'), was a Russian diplomat, explorer and podyachy (clerk) who served at the court of Ivan III and Vasily III.

== Career ==
Istoma journeyed to Denmark at the end of the 15th century along the Northeast Passage, which Russian and Danish ambassadors were forced to use as a result of the Russo-Swedish War of 1495–1497. The Ustyug Chronicle dates the Russian embassy and the Danish return embassy to 1496–1497. The most probable date is 1496, as evidenced by the writings of Sigismund von Herberstein. Istoma traveled from the mouth of the Northern Dvina, around the Kola Peninsula, to the Barents Sea and then to Trondheim, from where he continued by land to the south of the Scandinavian Peninsula and then to Copenhagen, the Danish capital.

Istoma's writing about his voyage to the Arctic Ocean, later published by Herberstein in 1549, is the first description in the European written tradition of a voyage to the northern coast of the Scandinavian Peninsula. Russian historians have often cited Istoma's 1496 voyage as evidence that Russian sources played a decisive role in influencing the planners of the 1553 English voyage to the White Sea. According to Terence Armstrong, it "seems a very reasonable possibility" that Istoma's voyage influenced them.

Istoma served as a translator from German and Latin at the Muscovite court and he also participated in the Russian embassies to Denmark and the Holy Roman Empire in 1517–1518. He also was the pristav (supervisory official) at the reception of Lithuanian and Holy Roman ambassadors in 1508, 1517, and 1526.

== Sources ==
- Khoroshkevich, A. L. (2008). "Истома". In Osipov, Yu. S. (ed.). Большая российская энциклопедия. Том 12: Исландия — Канцеляризмы (in Russian). Moscow: Большая российская энциклопедия. p. 100. ISBN 978-5-85270-343-9. Archived from the original on 6 October 2025.
- Okhuizen, Edwin; Nielsen, Jens, eds. (12 September 2022). From Northeast Passage to Northern Sea Route: A History of the Waterway North of Eurasia. BRILL. ISBN 978-90-04-52184-1.
