= Willoughby's Land =

Phantom islands of the Barents Sea

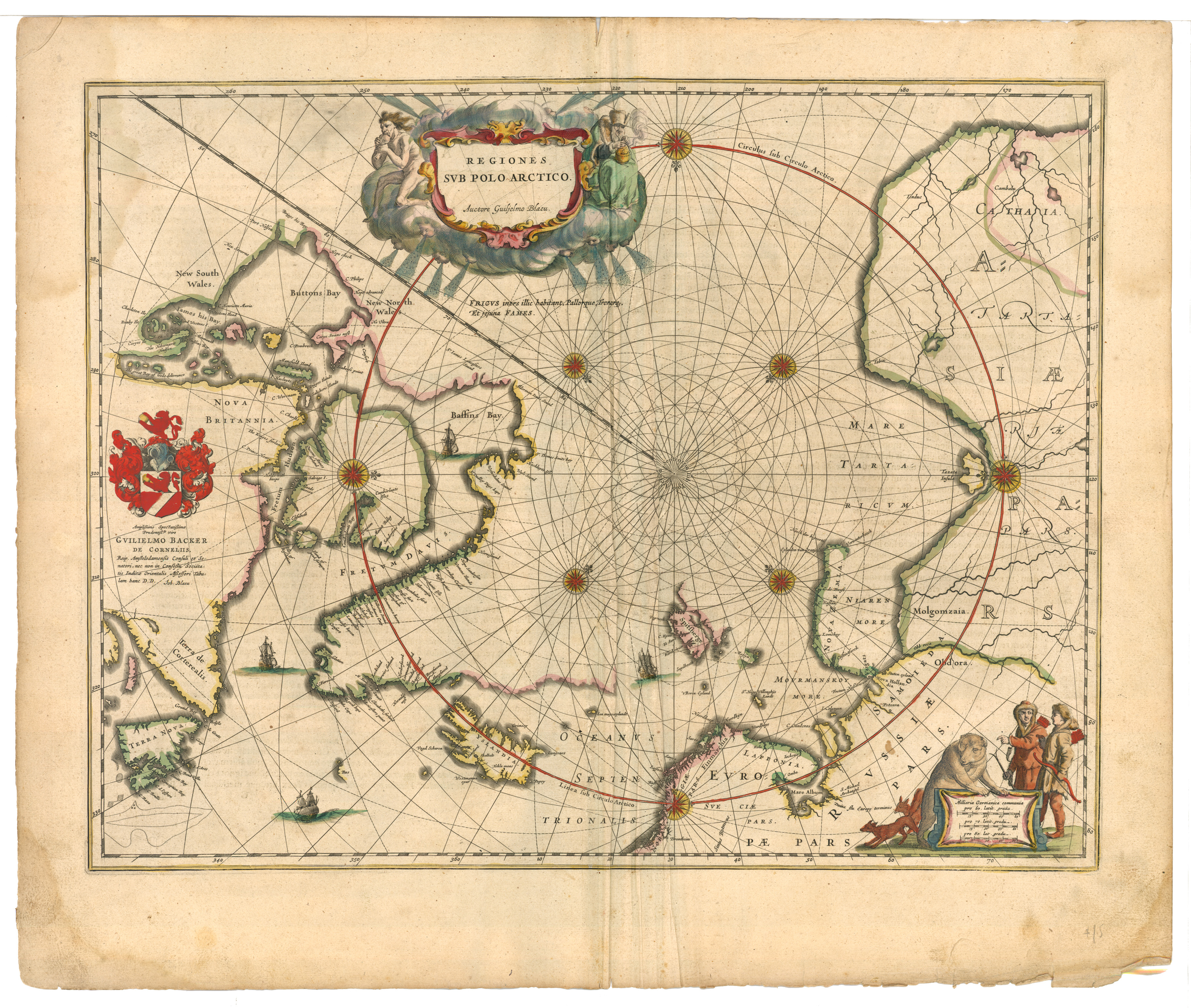
1645 map showing Willoughby's Land and Matsyn Island

During his 1553 voyage across the Barents Sea, English explorer Hugh Willoughby thought he saw islands to the north. Based on his description, these islands were subsequently depicted and named "Willoughby's Land" and "Macsinof Island" on maps published by Petrus Plancius in 1592 and 1594 (although he was doubtful of their existence). Gerardus Mercator included them on his 1595 map. Willem Barentsz found no sign of Willoughby's discoveries and omitted them from his map published in 1599, but they continued to appear on Arctic maps published by Jan Janssonius and Willem Blaeu at least into the 1640s.

A (erroneous) claim propagated in 1612 held that Willoughby's Land was identical to Spitsbergen, thus supporting an English claim prior to the Dutch discovery by Barentsz in 1596. This claim was used to justify a monopoly charter on whaling rights granted to the Muscovy Company in 1613.

Georg Michael Asher (1860) believed the two islands to be merely a western transposition of the two main islands of Novaya Zemlya.

== See also ==
- Surinam (English colony)
