= Beluga Shipping =

German transport company

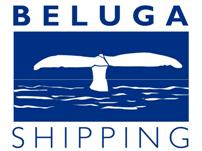
- Founded: December 1995; 30 years ago in Bremen, Germany
- Founder: Niels Stolberg

Beluga Shipping was a German heavy-lift shipping company in the Hanseatic city of Bremen. It was a world market leader in heavy-lift shipping and also highly innovative in related fields. As such, it was the first to equip ships of its fleet with SkySails that can reduce fuel consumption by up to 5%, and was the first company to send a heavy-lift ship from Europe to Asia along the Northern Sea Route through the Arctic Ocean rather than through the Suez Canal. The company was declared insolvent in March 2011, affecting 670 employees.

== History ==
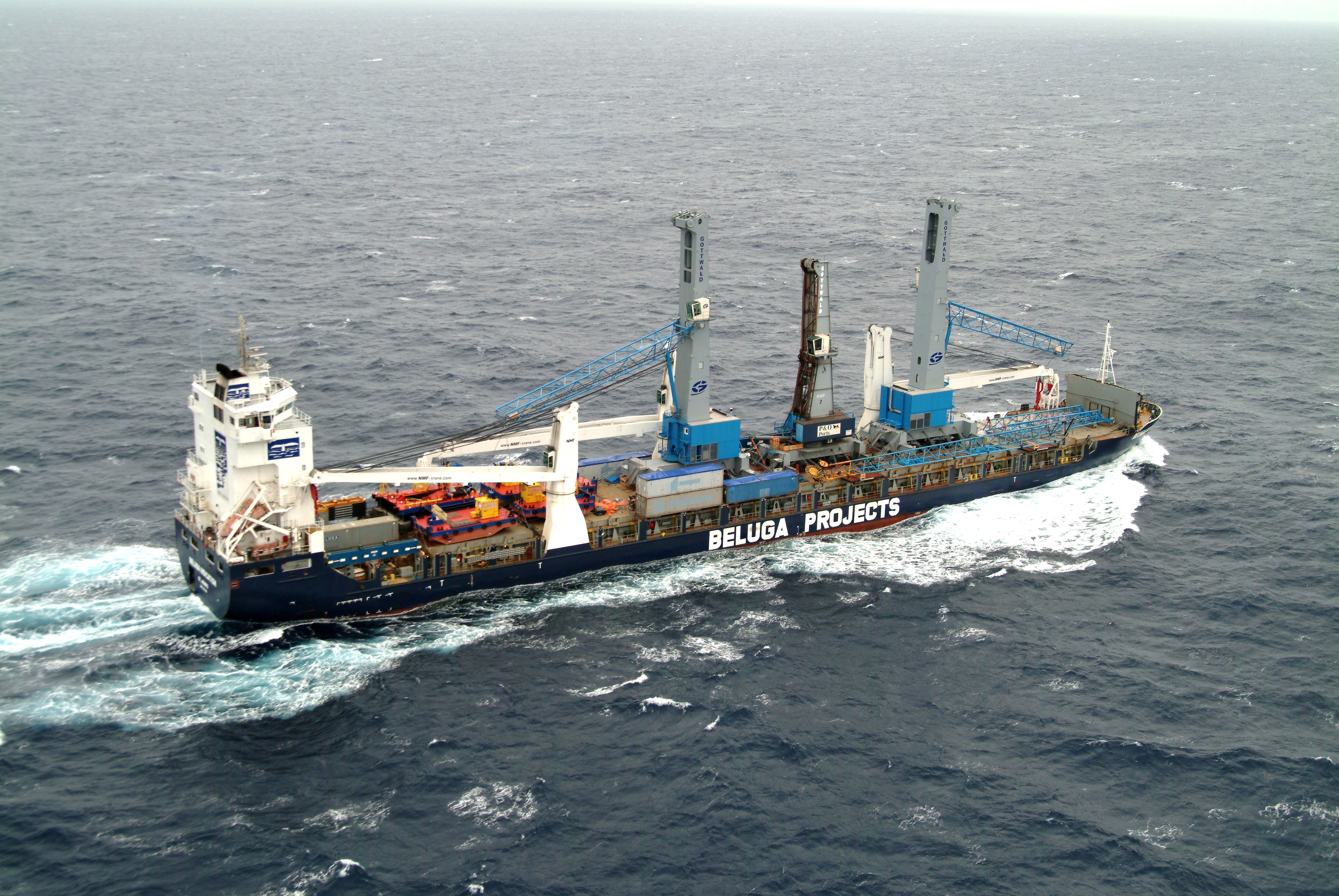
Multipurpose heavy-lift cargo carrier MV Beluga Indication transports three mobile harbour cranes and several barges on the ocean

Beluga Shipping was founded in Bremen in December 1995 by entrepreneur Niels Stolberg, initially as a cargo operator. In 1998, the company acquired its first vessel, the multipurpose heavy-lift carrier MV Beluga Obsession. In 1999, the company built its first new vessel, the MV Werder Bremen. Beluga Shipping grew significantly during the following years. By May 2010, 69 multipurpose heavy-lift carriers were in service for the company, with crane capacities reaching 1,400 tons in tandem usage (P-series). The fleet further increased to 70 units by end of 2010. The company offered trade lane management but concentrated on tramp shipping, meaning each transport was organized individually according to the requirements of the cargo and the port of loading and destination.

Since 2001, Beluga Shipping expanded its global network. By March 2009, the company ran twelve branch offices on five continents: Rotterdam, The Netherlands; London, United Kingdom; Stavanger, Norway; Moscow, Russia; Mumbai, India; Shanghai and Beijing, China; Tokyo, Japan; Singapore; Sydney, Australia; São Paulo, Brazil and Houston, United States. On the so-called Teerhof close to the Weser River in Bremen the new headquarters of the company was inaugurated in June 2009.

Due to the global recession, from 2010 on Beluga Shipping relied increasingly on financial help by the US financial investment firm Oaktree Capital Management. Since 28 February 2011 developments indicated that Oaktree Capital Management, shareholder with 49.5%, wanted to take over the Beluga-Group. The German Bundeskartellamt confirmed this.

On 3 March 2011, Niels Stolberg's retirement as CEO was announced and Oaktree appointee Roger Lliffe followed on his chair. With Stolberg, a few other leading managers were replaced.

Soon after Oaktree's takeover, the company filed for bankruptcy. Oaktree subsequently founded a new heavy-lift shipping company with part of the Beluga Fleet, the Hamburg-based Hansa Heavy Lift.

== Business segments ==
Core competence of Beluga Shipping was the sea transport of project and heavy-lift cargo. The group was judicially divided into three companies. Beluga Shipping GmbH formed a holding company and was responsible for the strategic planning, finance, marketing, human resources etc. Beluga Chartering GmbH provided for the affreightment of the Beluga fleet with cargo. The Beluga Fleet Management GmbH & Co. KG was responsible for the seagoing personnel, the nautical and technical management of the vessels as well as the newbuilding of vessels.

== Research and innovation ==
As one of the few companies in this sector, Beluga Shipping ran its own research and innovation department. Furthermore, Beluga Shipping was the initiator of the public private partnership project Maritime Campus Elsfleth, of which the Maritime Research Centre Elsfleth formed a part. The Maritime Campus Elsfleth aimed for the promotion of science, economy, education and research in the maritime sector. Beluga Shipping operated the world's first newly built vessel co-powered by wind using a towing kite system. The goal of MV Beluga Skysails was to reduce fuel consumption and emissions. It was first tested on the ship Beluga SkySails, launched December 15, 2007, in Hamburg, which was equipped with a sail that could reduce fuel consumption by 5.5% on parts of the route. Further, a ship from the Beluga Group was the first to traverse the icy Northern Sea Route through the Arctic Ocean in the summer of 2009. The passage is 1/3 shorter compared to traversing through the Mediterranean and the Suez Canal. The company was recognised by Hermann Simon as a role model for other small to medium-sized business in his book Hidden Champions.

== Criminal investigation ==
In 2012, the public prosecutor in Bremen found that the Beluga Eternity (a ship from the Beluga E-Series) had transported rockets and 16 Russian tanks in July 2009 from the Ukrainian port of Oktyabrsk to Myanmar, while the latter was a military dictatorship and subject to an arms embargo of the EU. Similarly, the Beluga Endurance was found to have transported tanks and munition from Oktyabrsk to Mombasa for further transportation to the newly created state of South Sudan. However, in both cases the ship was leased at that time and knowledge of the operation on part of Beluga Shipping could not be proven. Niels Stolberg was cleared of these charges. The Bremen public prosecutor referred the case of the Myanmar Shipment to the Federal Public Prosecutor in Karlsruhe, as it suspected involvement by personnel of Germany's Bundesnachrichtendienst in the case. However, the Federal Public Prosecutor saw no grounds for hearing the case and referred it back to the Bremen public prosecutor.

In February 2013, the Bremen public prosecutor opened a new process against Niels Stolberg and a Dutch shipping company for having engaged in credit fraud in the amount of 93 million Euro. The companies are accused of having declared much higher production costs of ships to their banks and credit-granting institutions, thus raising the latter's share from 70% to 100%. If proven guilty, Stolberg could be imprisoned for up to three years.

Beluga Shipping is also accused of having manipulated accounts to improve the company's financial balance between 2006 and 2010. In 2009, the company claimed a transaction volume of 415 million Euro. This was partially achieved by claiming possession of much more power fuel than the entire shipping fleet could comprise.

== Social Responsibility ==
The educational concept of Beluga Shipping was unique in the maritime business. On six training vessels and additional units of the Beluga fleet, the Sea Academy of Beluga Shipping offered up to 160 cadets a year of training. The training vessels were equipped with an additional deck including the accommodation for the cadets, a class room and a maritime library. In addition, Beluga Shipping financed several professorships at the University of Applied Sciences Oldenburg/Ostfriesland/Wilhelmshaven and the University of Applied Sciences Bremen. The international study course Shipping & Chartering (ISSC) was developed in cooperation with Beluga Shipping and the University of Applied Sciences Bremen. Social responsibility was a substantial part of the corporate philosophy. In response to the misery and destruction caused by the tsunami catastrophe in 2004, Beluga Shipping built up the "Beluga School for Life", a village in Thailand for orphans and other juvenile victims. The aims of the project were to provide shelter for the children in family-like accommodations and to provide education intended to break the circle of poverty.

== Competitors in Germany ==
- Schifffahrtskontor Altes Land GmbH & Co. KG
- Rickmers Reederei GmbH & Cie. kg
- BBC Chartering & Logistic GmbH & Co. KG
- Harren & Partner Ship Management GmbH & Co. KG
