= 1607 =

1607 in various calendars
- Gregorian calendar: 1607; MDCVII
- Ab urbe condita: 2360
- Armenian calendar: 1056; ԹՎ ՌԾԶ
- Assyrian calendar: 6357
- Balinese saka calendar: 1528–1529
- Bengali calendar: 1013–1014
- Berber calendar: 2557
- English Regnal year: 4 Ja. 1 – 5 Ja. 1
- Buddhist calendar: 2151
- Burmese calendar: 969
- Byzantine calendar: 7115–7116
- Chinese calendar: 丙午年 (Fire Horse); 4304 or 4097 — to — 丁未年 (Fire Goat); 4305 or 4098
- Coptic calendar: 1323–1324
- Discordian calendar: 2773
- Ethiopian calendar: 1599–1600
- Hebrew calendar: 5367–5368
- Hindu calendars
- Vikram Samvat: 1663–1664
- Shaka Samvat: 1528–1529
- Kali Yuga: 4707–4708
- Holocene calendar: 11607
- Igbo calendar: 607–608
- Iranian calendar: 985–986
- Islamic calendar: 1015–1016
- Japanese calendar: Keichō 12 (慶長１２年)
- Javanese calendar: 1527–1528
- Julian calendar: Gregorian minus 10 days
- Korean calendar: 3940
- Minguo calendar: 305 before ROC 民前305年
- Nanakshahi calendar: 139
- Thai solar calendar: 2149–2150
- Tibetan calendar: མེ་ཕོ་རྟ་ལོ་ (male Fire-Horse); 1733 or 1352 or 580 — to — མེ་མོ་ལུག་ལོ་ (female Fire-Sheep); 1734 or 1353 or 581

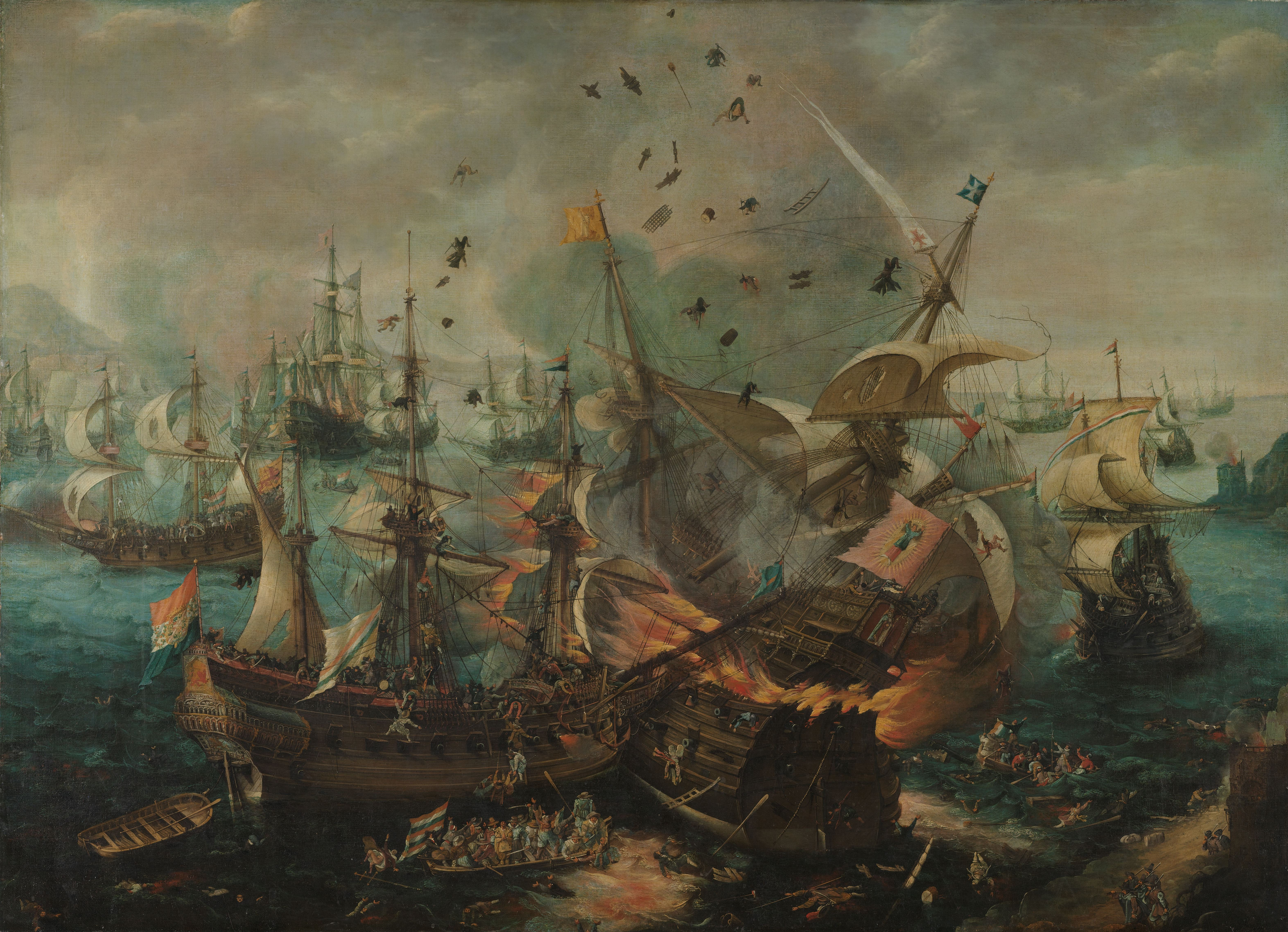
April 25: Battle of Gibraltar

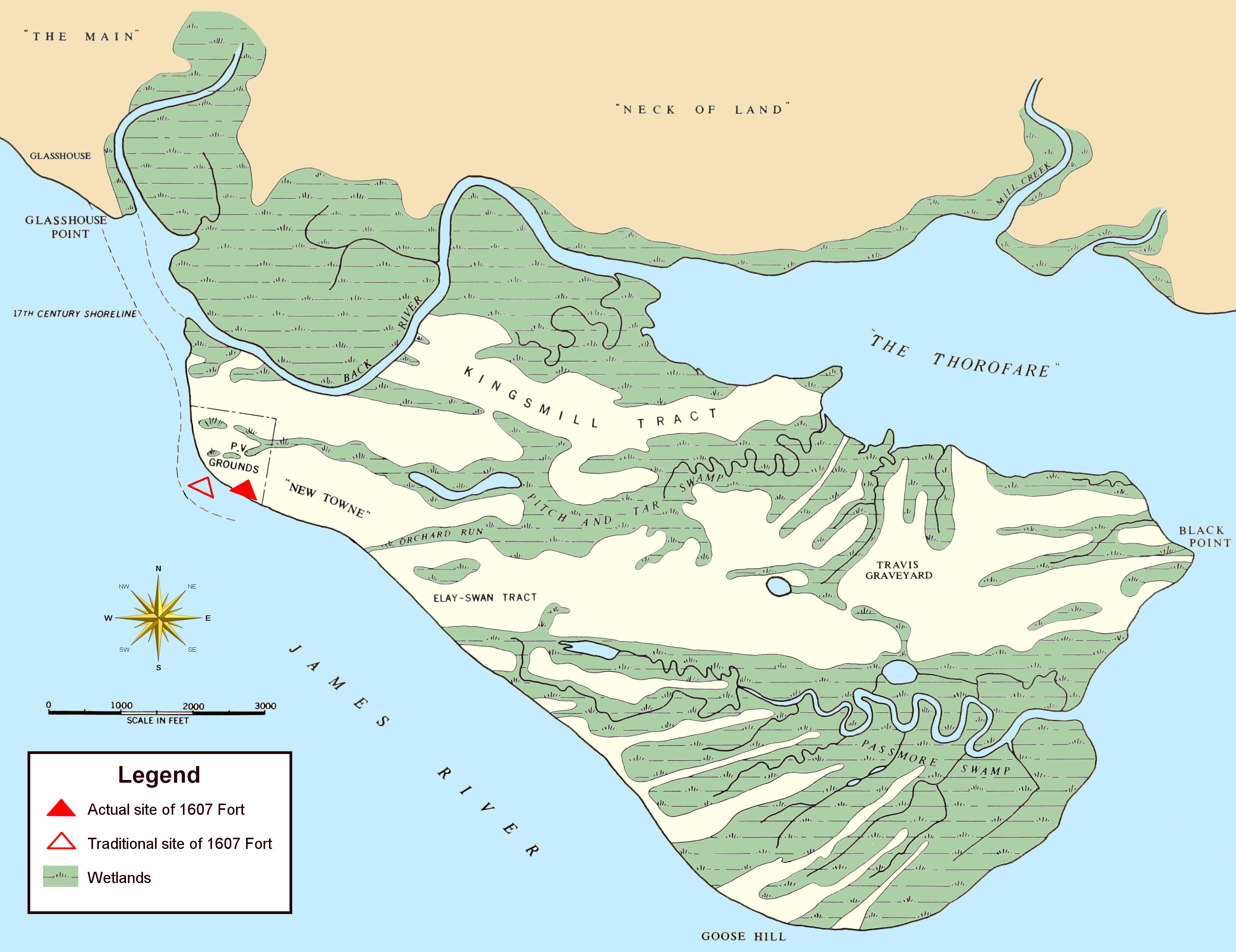
May 14: Map of Jamestown Island, showing the terrain and location of the original 1607 fort

1607 (MDCVII) was a common year starting on Monday of the Gregorian calendar and a common year starting on Thursday of the Julian calendar, the 1607th year of the Common Era (CE) and Anno Domini (AD) designations, the 607th year of the 2nd millennium, the 7th year of the 17th century, and the 8th year of the 1600s decade. As of the start of 1607, the Gregorian calendar was 10 days ahead of the Julian calendar, which remained in localized use until 1923.

The year 1607 was a significant year in world history, with the beginning of the British colonization of the Americas with the Jamestown settlement, as well as the Battle of Gibraltar culminating in the Twelve Years’ Truce.

== Events ==
=== January–March ===
- January 13 – The Bank of Genoa fails.
- January 19 – San Agustin Church, Manila, is officially completed; by the 21st century it will be the oldest church in the Philippines.
- January 30 – Coastal flooding around Britain, probably a storm surge, including Bristol Channel floods in which a massive wave sweeps along the Bristol Channel, killing an estimated 2,000 people.
- February 24 – Claudio Monteverdi's L'Orfeo, the earliest fully developed opera in the modern-day repertoire, premieres at the Ducal Palace of Mantua.
- March 10 – Battle of Gol in Gojjam: Susenyos defeats the combined armies of Yaqob and Abuna Petros II, which makes him Emperor of Ethiopia.

=== April–June ===
- April 25 – Battle of Gibraltar: A Dutch fleet of 26 warships, led by Admiral Jacob van Heemskerck, stages a surprise attack on a Spanish fleet anchored in the Bay of Gibraltar. In the battle that ensues, Spain loses as many as 10 galleons and 12 smaller ships, and at least 300 men are killed. The disaster causes Spain to go into bankruptcy by October.
- April 26 – English colonists make landfall at Cape Henry, Virginia, later moving up the James River.
- May 14 – Jamestown, Virginia, is established as the first permanent English settlement in North America, beginning the American frontier.
- May 15 – From Jamestown, Christopher Newport, George Percy, Gabriel Archer and others travel six days exploring along the James River up to the falls and Powhatan's village.
- May 26 – At Jamestown, the president of the governing council, Edward Wingfield, directs the fort to be strengthened and armed against the many attacks of the natives: "Hereupon the President was contented the Fort should be pallisadoed, the ordinance mounted, his men armed and exercised, for many were the assaults and Ambuscadoes of the Savages ..." 200 armed Indians attack the Jamestown settlement, killing two people and wounding 10.
- May 28 – A wooden defensive wall (palisade) is built by settlers around the Fort at Jamestown. Gabriel Archer writes in his journal, "we laboured, pallozadoing our fort".
- June 5 – Dr John Hall marries Susanna, daughter of William Shakespeare, at the Church of the Holy Trinity, Stratford-upon-Avon (England).
- June 8 – Newton rebellion: The Tresham landowning family kills more than 40 peasants during protests against the enclosure of common land in Newton, Northamptonshire, England, at the culmination of the Midland Revolt.
- June 10 – In Jamestown, Captain John Smith is released from arrest and sworn in as a member of the colony Council.
- June 15 – At Jamestown, the triangular fort is completed and armed: "The fifteenth of June we had built and finished our Fort, which was triangle wise, having three Bulwarkes, at every corner, like a halfe Moone, and foure or five pieces of Artillerie mounted in them. We had made our selves sufficiently strong for these Savages. We had also sowne most of our Corne on two Mountaines." The colony reportedly bears extreme toil in strengthening the fort.
- June 22 – Christopher Newport sails back to England.

=== July–September ===
- July 2 – Luis de Velasco returns to office as the Spanish Viceroy of New Spain, which at this time includes Mexico, parts of the future United States and much of Central America. Velasco had previously been Viceroy from 1590 to 1595, then served as Viceroy of Peru (encompassing much of South America) from 1596 to 1604. He serves as New Spain's viceroy until 1611.
- July 5 – Zebrzydowski Rebellion: The Battle of Guzów is fought in Poland near Guzów against rebels by the combined armies of the Polish–Lithuanian Commonwealth, led by Poland's Hetman, General Stanisław Żółkiewski, and the Hetman of Lithuania, Jan Karol Chodkiewicz. The rebels, led by Mikołaj Zebrzydowski and Janusz Radziwiłł, are forced to retreat.
- July 10 – Ottoman Grand Vizier Kuyucu Murad Pasha launches a secret expedition to confront rebel Kurdish tribal chief Ali Janbulad, who has seized control of Aleppo in what is now Syria.
- July 17 – In the (modern-day) South Kalimantan province of Indonesia, Sultan Mustain Billah of Banjar orders the massacre of the crew of a Netherlands East India Company ship visiting the capital at Banjarmasin.
- July 20 – The second "False Dmitry", one of three people claiming to be Dmitry Ivanovich, son of the late Tsar Ivan the Terrible, appears at the Russian town of Starodub and persuades residents that he is the rightful heir to the Russian throne.
- August 3 – After Catholics and Protestants clash in Donauwörth, emperor Rudolph II declares an imperial ban over the city and orders Bavarian duke Maximilian I to execute the ban leading to the occupation of the city by a force of 15,000 in December. This in turn leads to the creation of the Protestant Union in 1608.
- August 13 – The ship Gift of God of the Plymouth Company arrives at the mouth of the modern-day Kennebec River in Maine. English colonists establish Fort St. George, also known as the Popham Colony. The settlement lasts little more than a year, before residents return to England in the first oceangoing ship built in the New World, a 30-ton pinnace called The Virginia.
- September 5 – Hamlet is performed aboard the East India Company ship Red Dragon, under the command of Capt. William Keeling, anchored off the coast of Sierra Leone, the first known performance of a Shakespeare play outside England in English, and the first by amateurs.
- September 10 – Jamestown President Edward Maria Wingfield is deposed and John Ratcliffe elected.
- September 14 – Flight of the Earls: Hugh O'Neill, 2nd Earl of Tyrone, and Rory O'Donnell, 1st Earl of Tyrconnell, flee Ireland for Spain with 90 followers, to avoid capture by the English crown, never to return.
- September – The Scrooby Congregation of Protestant English Separatists attempt to flee to the Dutch Republic from Boston, Lincolnshire, but are betrayed, arrested and imprisoned for a time.

=== October–December ===
- October 4 – Flight of the Earls: The Earl of Tyrone and the Earl of Tyrconnell, along with their followers, reach the European continent, landing on St. Francis' Day at Quilleboeuf in France with 99 people. after having departed Rathmullan in Ireland on September 12.
- October 27 – Halley's Comet is seen by Johannes Kepler.
- November 7 – A Dutch warship commanded by Admiral Cornelis Matelief de Jonge arrives at the Malay Peninsula to attempt opening trade with the Pahang Sultanate, and get Pahang's assistance in the Dutch Navy's fight against the Portuguese Navy in Asian trade. Sultan Abdul Ghafur agrees to assistance in return for Dutch technical assistance.
- November 9 – King Philip III of Spain announces that his government had run out of money and that it is suspending payments on its foreign debts. effectively declaring the state bankrupt. The decision in the wake of the destruction of most of the ships of Spain's Navy at the April 25 Battle of Gibraltar.
- November 15 – Flight of the Earls: After the departure from Ireland of Hugh O'Neill, Earl of Tyrone and Rory O'Donnell, 1st Earl of Tyrconnell, along with 90 of their followers, King James I of England, Scotland and Ireland issues a proclamation "that the flight of the Earles of Tyrone and Tyrconell, with some others of their fellowes out of the North parts of our Realme of Ireland; these men's corruption and falshood, whose hainous offences remaine so fresh in memorie since they declared themselves so very monsters in nature, as they did not only whithdraw themselues from their personall obedience to their Soveraigne, but were content to sell over their Native Countrey to those that stood at that time in the highest termes of hostilitie with the two Crownes of England and Ireland... we doe hereby professe in the worde of a King, that... notwithstanding all that they can claime, must be acknowledged to proceed from meere Grace upon their submission after their great and unnaturall Treasons", and must forfeit their rights and possessions as nobles.
- December 10 – Captain John Smith and nine men depart the Jamestown Colony on a barge in order to get more corn for the English fort. Sailing up the Chickahominy River, the boat reaches a settlement of the Appomattoc tribe at Apocant. While Smith, Jehu Robinson and Thomas Emery are further upstream in a canoe, George Casson is captured at Apocant by Opchanacanough, brother of Chief Powhatan. Robinson and Emery are killed while Smith is away from their camp, and Smith is soon taken prisoner by Opchancanough and, on January 5, is delivered to Powhatan at Werowocomoco for execution. After an intervention by Powhatan's daughter, Pocahontas, Smith is released a month after his capture.
- December 22 – A fleet of 13 Dutch warships under the command of Admiral Pieter Verhoeff departs the Netherlands on an expedition to the Indian Ocean to open trade with Asian nations and to fight hostile resistance. Verhoeff never returns, and he and many of his crew will be ambushed and killed on May 22 at the Banda Islands in Indonesia.

=== Date unknown ===
- The rule of Andorra passes jointly to the king of France, and the Bishop of Urgell.
- In the Midland Revolt against Enclosures in England, the term Levellers is first used.
- Missionary Juan Fonte establishes the first Jesuit mission among the Tarahumara, in the Sierra Madre Mountains of Northwest Mexico.

== Births ==
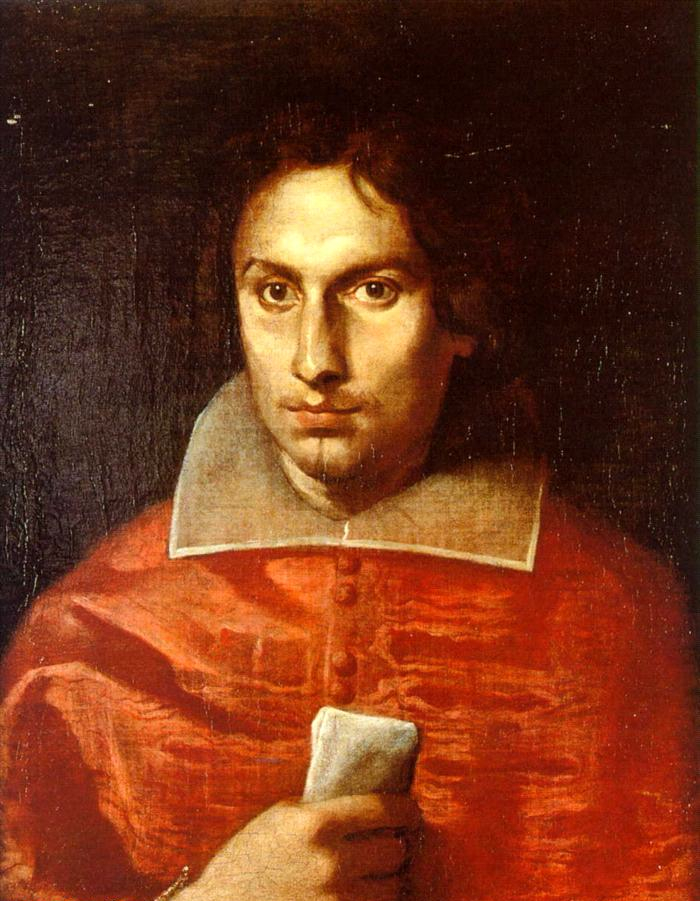
Antonio Barberini

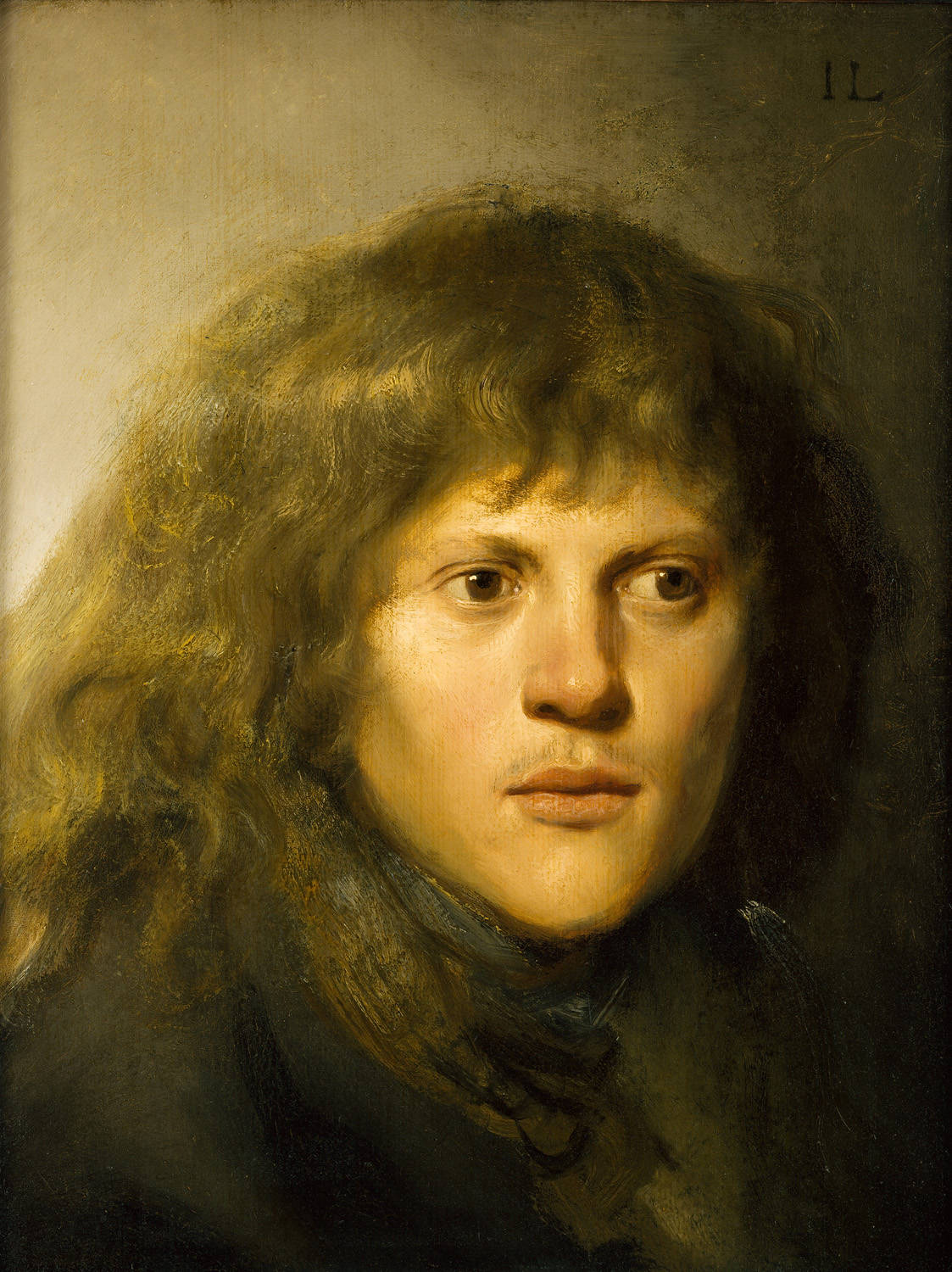
Jan Lievens

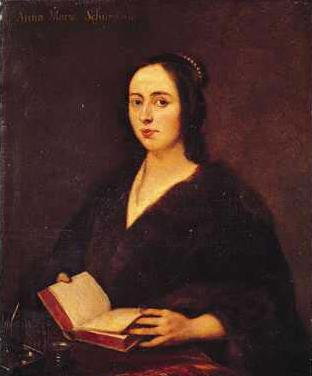
Anna Maria van Schurman

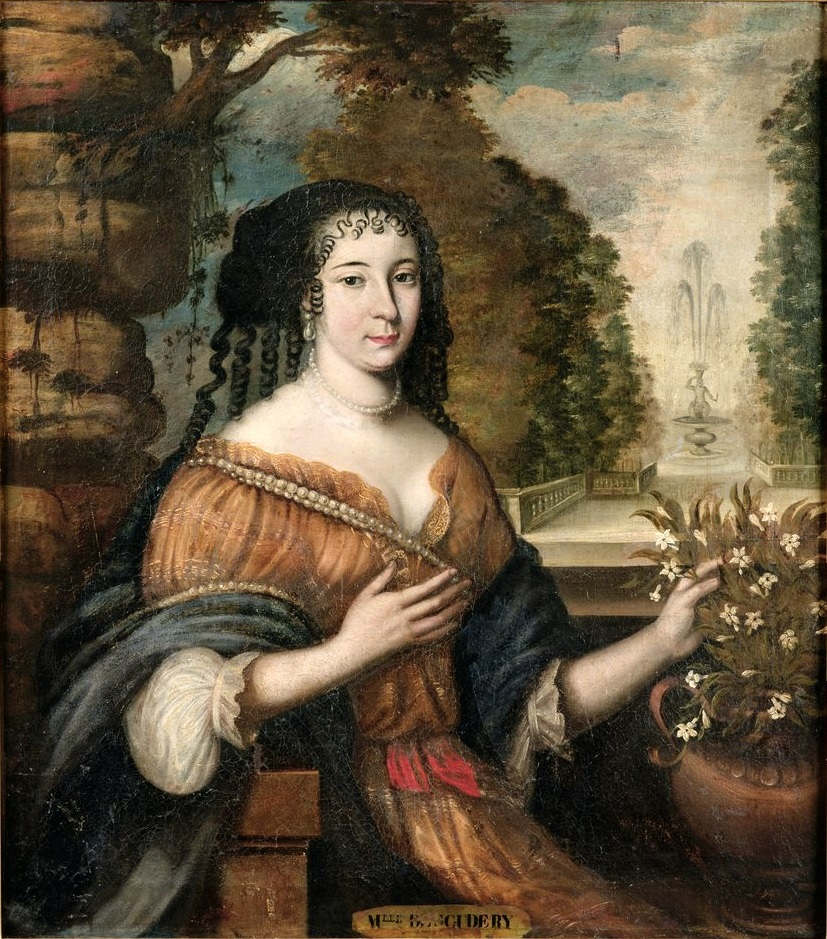
Madeleine de Scudéry

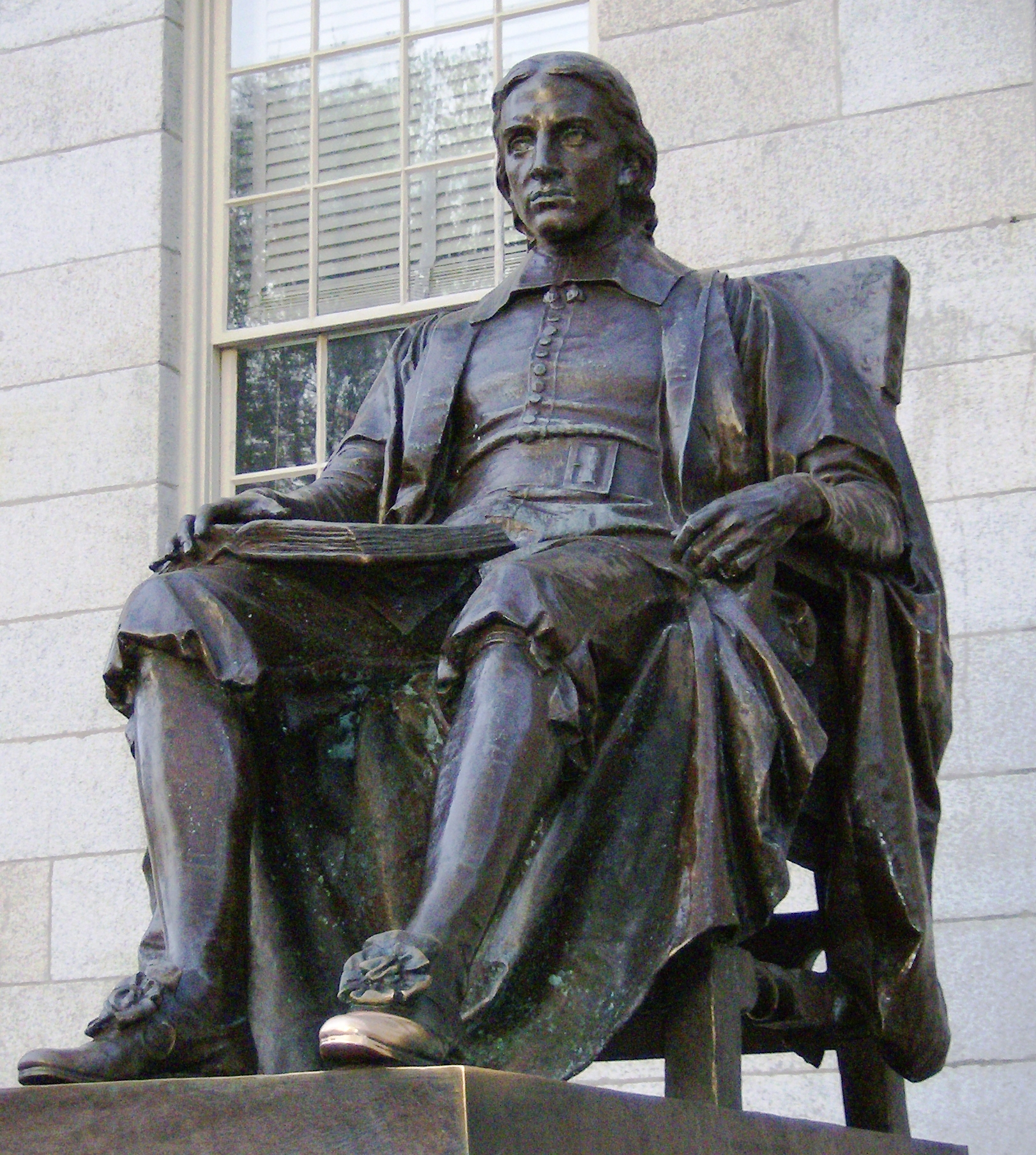
John Harvard

=== January–March ===
- January 10 – Isaac Jogues, French Jesuit missionary to the Native Americans (d. 1646)
- January 30 – Willem Nieupoort, Dutch politician, and diplomat (d. 1678)
- January 31 – James Stanley, 7th Earl of Derby (d. 1651)
- February 9 – Abraham Megerle, Austrian composer and organist (d. 1680)
- February 22 – Edward Thurland, English politician (d. 1683)
- February 25 – Ahasuerus Fromanteel, English clockmaker (d. 1693)
- February 27 – Christian Keymann, German hymnwriter (d. 1662)
- March – Archibald Campbell, 1st Marquess of Argyll, Scottish clan chief (d. 1661)
- March 8 – Johann Rist, German poet and dramatist known for hymns (d. 1667)
- March 9 – Gervase Holles, English Member of Parliament (d. 1675)
- March 10 – Thomas Wriothesley, 4th Earl of Southampton, English statesman (d. 1667)
- March 12 – Paul Gerhardt, German theologian (d. 1676)
- March 24 – Michiel de Ruyter, Dutch admiral (d. 1676)
- March 31 – Philippe Le Sueur de Petiville, French poet (d. 1657)

=== April–June ===
- April 5 – (bapt.) John Boys, English Royalist soldier, Lord Warden of the Cinque Ports (d. 1664)
- April 16 – Nicolas Henri, Duke of Orléans, French duke (d. 1611)
- April 26 – Countess Palatine Magdalene Catherine of Zweibrücken and Duchess of Birkenfeld (d. 1648)
- May 21 – Sir Philip Musgrave, 2nd Baronet, English politician (d. 1678)
- May 31 – Johann Wilhelm Baur, German artist (d. 1640)
- June 17 – Lacuzon, Franche-Comté military leader (d. 1681)
- June 24 – Jean-Jacques Renouard de Villayer, French postal pioneer (d. 1691)

=== July–September ===
- July 1 – Thomas de Critz, British artist (d. 1653)
- July 12 – Jean Petitot, French-Swiss enamel painter (d. 1691)
- July 13 – Václav Hollar, Bohemian etcher (d. 1677)
- August – Claude de Rouvroy, duc de Saint-Simon, French courtier (d. 1693)
- August 5
  - Antonio Barberini, Italian Catholic cardinal (d. 1671)
  - Philipp Friedrich Böddecker, German organist and composer (d. 1683)
- August 6 – Dirck van der Lisse, Dutch painter (d. 1669)
- August 15
  - St. Francisco Fernandez de Capillas, Spanish saint (d. 1648)
  - Herman IV, Landgrave of Hesse-Rotenburg (d. 1658)
- August 24 – Sebastian von Rostock, German bishop (d. 1671)
- September 15 – Archduke Charles of Austria (d. 1632)
- September 25 – Dorothea of Anhalt-Zerbst, Duchess of Brunswick-Wolfenbüttel (d. 1634)
- September 26 – Francesco Cairo, Italian painter (d. 1665)

=== October–December ===
- October 4 – Francisco de Rojas Zorrilla, Spanish dramatist (d. 1648)
- October 19 – Louis of Anhalt-Köthen, German prince (d. 1624)
- October 24 – Jan Lievens, Dutch painter (d. 1674)
- October 25 – Antonio de la Cerda, 7th Duke of Medinaceli, Grandee of Spain (d. 1671)
- November 1 – Georg Philipp Harsdörffer, Baroque-period German poet and translator (d. 1658)
- November 5 – Anna Maria van Schurman, Dutch painter (d. 1678)
- November 6 – Sigmund Theophil Staden, important early German composer (d. 1655)
- November 10 – John Gregory, English orientalist (d. 1646)
- November 15
  - Ernest Casimir, Count of Nassau-Weilburg, founder of the younger line of Nassau-Weilburg (d. 1655)
  - Madeleine de Scudéry, French writer (d. 1701)
- November 23 – Andrzej Trzebicki, nobleman and priest in the Polish-Lithuanian Commonwealth (d. 1679)
- November 25 – Kanō Naonobu, Japanese painter of the Kanō school of painting during the early Edo period (d. 1650)
- November 26 – John Harvard, English-born American clergyman (d. 1638)
- November 28 – Francesco Sforza Pallavicino (d. 1667)
- December 4 – John Frescheville, 1st Baron Frescheville, English politician (d. 1682)
- December 6 – Christopher Turnor, English judge (d. 1675)
- December 10 – Kjeld Stub, Danish priest (d. 1663)
- December 14 – John Kemény, Prince of Transylvania (d. 1662)
- December 17 – Pacecco De Rosa, Italian painter (d. 1656)
- December 19 – Remigius van Leemput, painter from the Southern Netherlands (d. 1675)
- December 30
  - Sir James Harington, 3rd Baronet, English politician (d. 1680)
  - Song Si-yeol, Korean philosopher (d. 1689)

=== Probable ===
- Elizabeth Tilley, English pilgrim settler in North America who was one of the original passengers of the Mayflower (d. 1687)
- Jan Kazimierz Krasiński, Polish nobleman (d. 1669)
- John Dixwell, English judge and regicide (d. 1689)
- Pierre de Fermat, French mathematician (d. 1665)
- Yagyū Jūbei Mitsuyoshi, Japanese samurai (d. 1650)

== Deaths ==
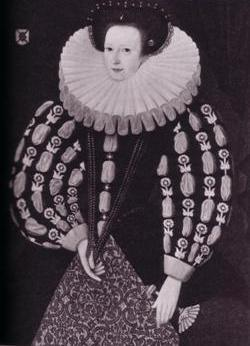
Anne Morgan, Baroness Hunsdon

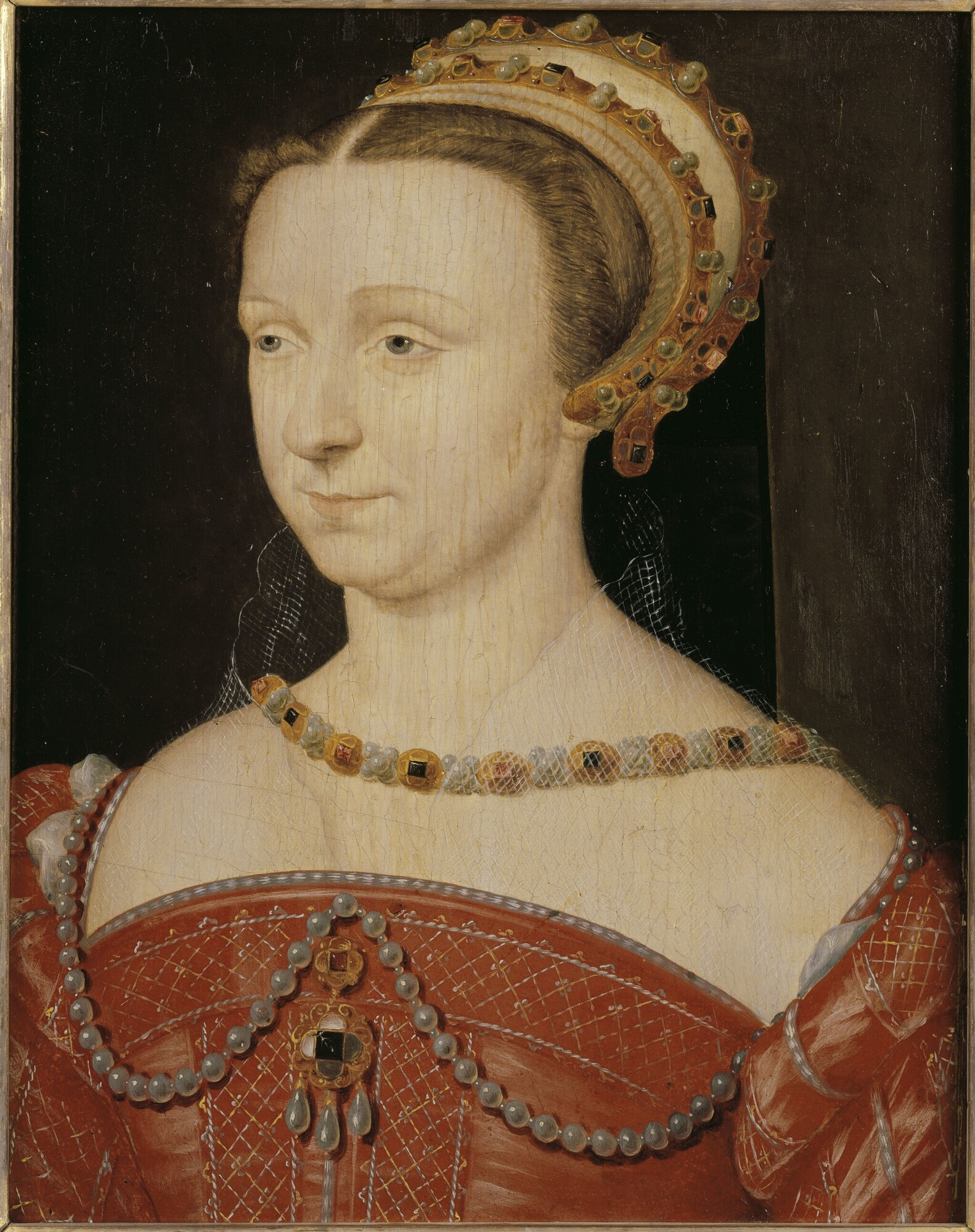
Anna d'Este

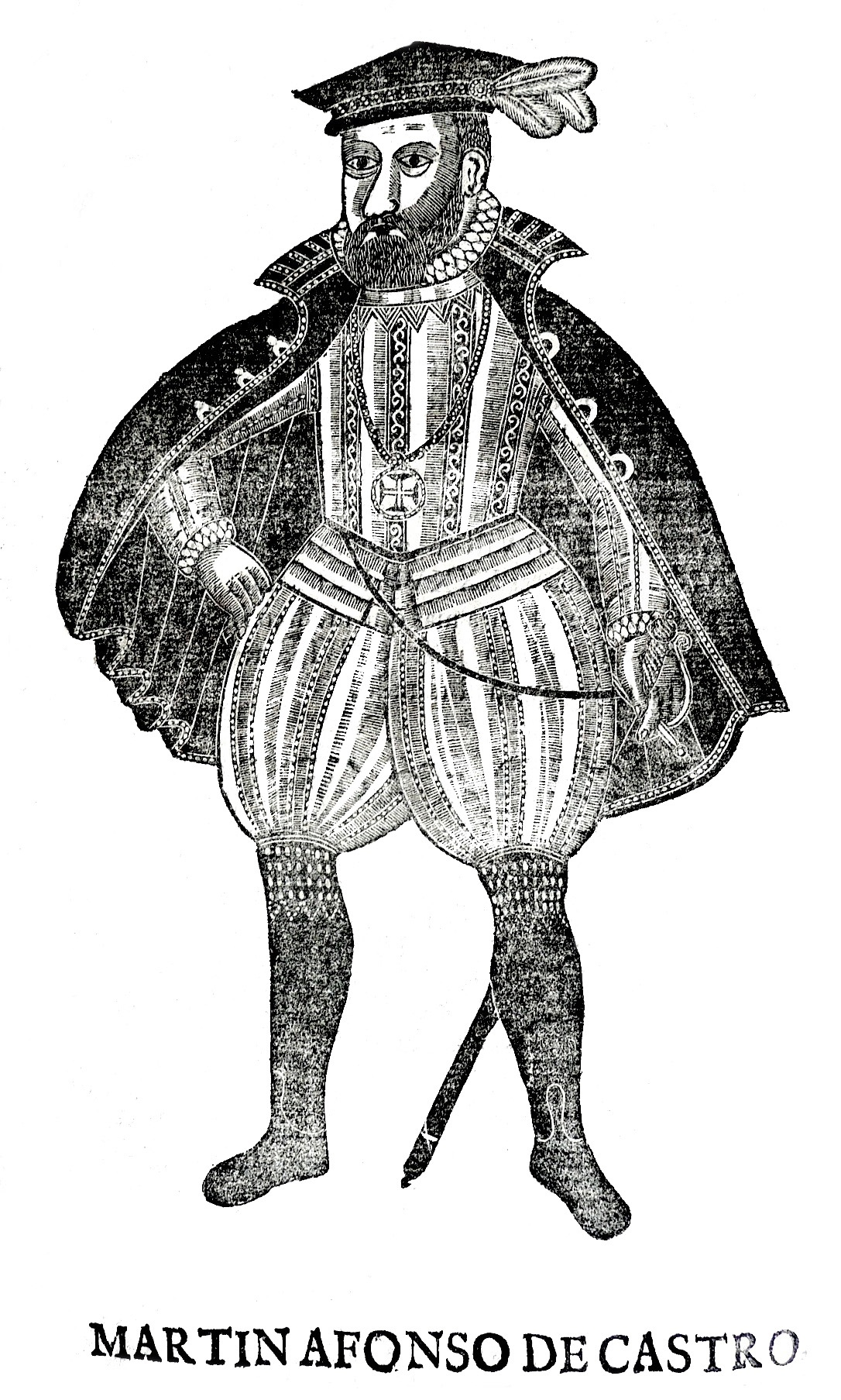
Martim Afonso de Castro

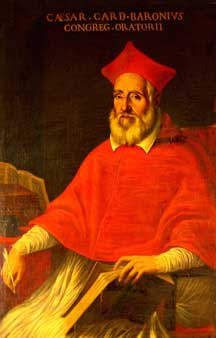
Caesar Baronius

=== January–March ===
- January 6 – Guidobaldo del Monte, Italian mathematician, astronomer and philosopher (b. 1545)
- January 12 – Mihály Káthay, Hungarian politician (b. c. 1565)
- January 19 – Anne Morgan, Baroness Hunsdon, English Baroness (b. 1529)
- January 25 – Anders Foss, Norwegian bishop (b. 1543)
- January 27 – Richard Lowther, English soldier and official (b. 1532)
- March 11 – Giovanni Maria Nanino, Italian composer (b. c. 1543)
- March 29 – Tsugaru Tamenobu, Japanese daimyō (b. 1550)
- March 31 – Henry Beaumont, English landowner and MP (b. 1545)

=== April–June ===
- April 6 – Jan Saenredam, Dutch engraver (b. 1565)
- April 9 – Eleanor of Prussia, daughter of Duke Albert Frederick of Prussia; by marriage Electress of Brandenburg (b. 1583)
- April 15
  - César de Bus, French Catholic priest (b. 1544)
  - Cornelis Kiliaan, 16th-century writer from the Southern Netherlands (b. 1528)
- April 27 – Edward Cromwell, 3rd Baron Cromwell, Governor of Lecale (b. 1560)
- May – Edward Dyer, English courtier and poet (b. 1543)
- May 3 – Agnes Douglas, Countess of Argyll, Scottish noblewoman (b. 1574)
- May 17 – Anna d'Este, French princess (b. 1531)
- May 21 – John Rainolds, English scholar and Bible translator (b. 1549)
- May 25 – Mary Magdalene de' Pazzi, Italian Carmelite nun and mystic (b. 1566)
- June 2 – Yūki Hideyasu, daimyō (b. 1574)
- June 3 – Martim Afonso de Castro, Portuguese Viceroy of India (b. 1560)
- June 7 – Johannes Matelart, composer (b. c. 1538)
- June 10 – John Popham, Lord Chief Justice of England (b. 1531)
- June 19
  - Johannes Bertelius, Luxembourgish historian (b. 1544)
  - Patriarch Job of Moscow
- June 28 – Domenico Fontana, Italian architect (b. 1543)
- June 30 – Caesar Baronius, Italian cardinal and historian (b. 1538)

=== July–September ===
- July 6 – Achille Gagliardi, Italian philosopher and theologian (b. 1537)
- July 7 – Penelope Blount, Countess of Devonshire, English noblewoman (b. 1563)
- July 12 – Thomas Legge, British writer (b. 1535)
- July 24 – Alessandro Pieroni, Italian painter (b. 1550)
- July 29 – Alexander Chocke of Avington, English politician (b. 1566)
- August 1 – Otto Casmann, German philosopher (b. 1562)
- August 22 – Bartholomew Gosnold, English explorer and privateer (b. 1571)
- August 29 – Ercole Sassonia, Italian physician (b. 1551)
- September 5 – Pomponne de Bellièvre, French politician (b. 1529)
- September 10 – Luzzasco Luzzaschi, Italian composer (b. 1545)
- September 16 – Mary Stuart, English-Scottish princess (b. 1605)
- September 22 – Alessandro Allori, Italian portrait painter of the late Mannerist Florentine school (b. 1535)

=== October–December ===
- October 16 – Hōzōin In'ei, Japanese Buddhist teacher (b. 1521)
- October 31 – Wawrzyniec Grzymała Goślicki, Polish philosopher (b. 1530)
- November 7 – Ana de Velasco y Girón, mother of King John IV of Portugal (b. 1585)
- November 8 – Elisabeth of Anhalt-Zerbst, Electress of Brandenburg (b. 1563)
- November 24 – Juan de la Cerda, 6th Duke of Medinaceli, Spanish noble (b. 1569)
- December 20 – Sir John Bourke of Brittas, Irish recusant, hanged (b. 1550)
- December 31 – Edmund Shakespeare, English actor, brother of William Shakespeare (b. 1580)

=== Undated ===
- Chen Lin, general of Ming dynasty China and Korea
- Henry Chettle, English writer (b. 1564)
