= Willem Barentsz =

Dutch navigator, cartographer, and Arctic explorer (c. 1550 – 1597)

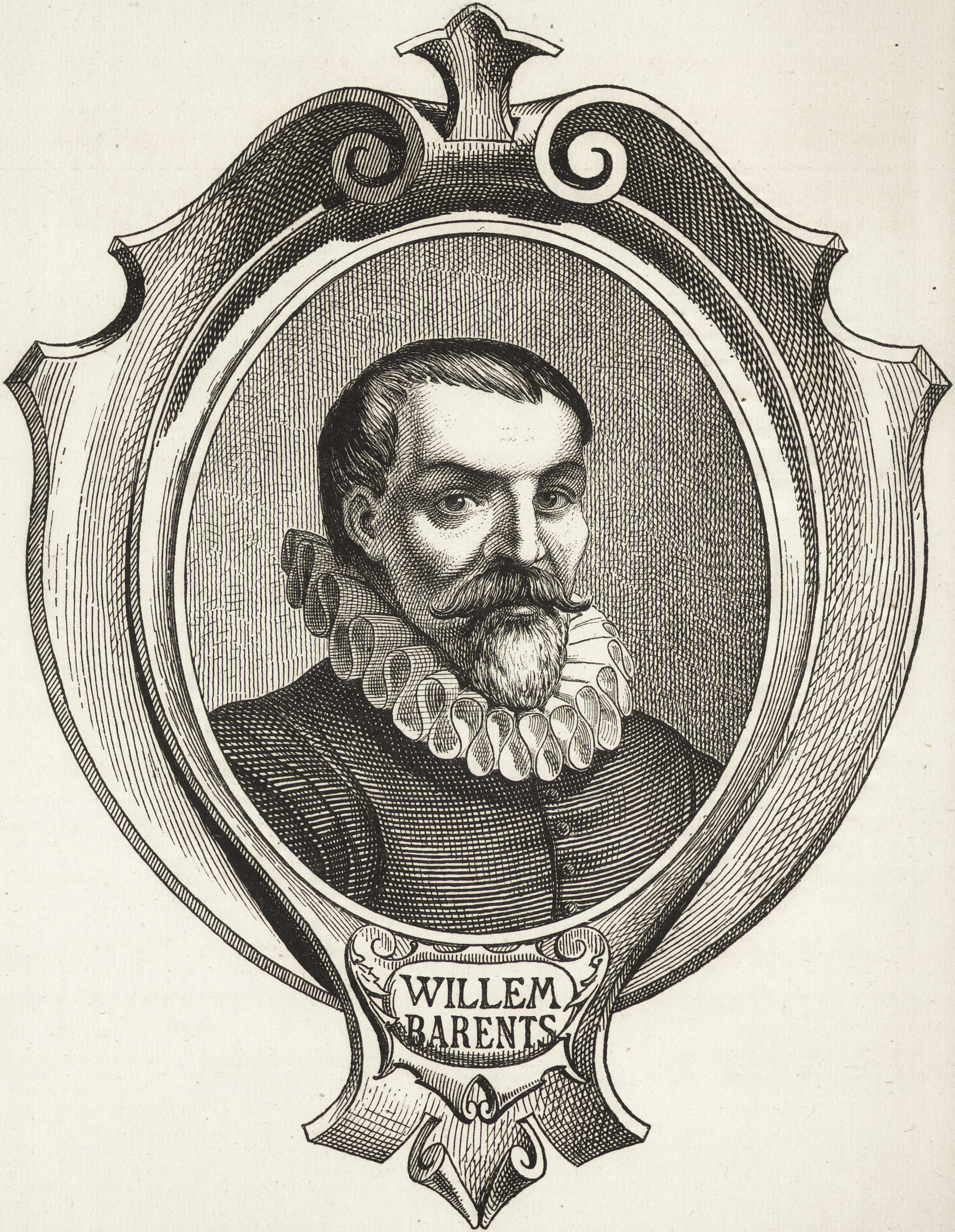
- Late 19th-century portrait based on an early 17th-century miniature engraving
- Born: c. 1550; Formerum, Terschelling, Seventeen Provinces
- Died: 20 June 1597 (aged 46–47) at sea in the Arctic region
- Occupation: Navigator
- Known for: Exploration of the Arctic

Willem Barentsz (Dutch pronunciation: [ˈʋɪləm ˈbaːrənts]; c. 1550 – 20 June 1597), anglicized as William Barents or Barentz, was a Dutch navigator, cartographer, and Arctic explorer.

Barentsz went on three expeditions to the far north in search for a Northeast passage. He reached as far as Novaya Zemlya and the Kara Sea in his first two voyages, but was turned back on both occasions by ice. During a third expedition, the crew discovered Spitsbergen and Bear Island, but subsequently became stranded on Novaya Zemlya for almost a year. Barentsz died on the return voyage in 1597.

The Barents Sea, among many other places, is named after him.

== Life and career ==
Willem Barentsz was born around 1550 in the village Formerum on the island Terschelling in the Seventeen Provinces, present-day Netherlands. Barentsz was not his surname but rather his patronymic name, short for Barentszoon "Barent's son".

A cartographer by trade, Barentsz sailed to Spain and the Mediterranean to complete an atlas of the Mediterranean region, which he co-published with Petrus Plancius.

His career as an explorer was spent searching for a Northeast passage in order to trade with China. He reasoned clear, open water north of Siberia must exist since the sun shone 24 hours a day melting Arctic sea ice, indeed he thought the farther north one went the less ice there would be.

=== First voyage ===
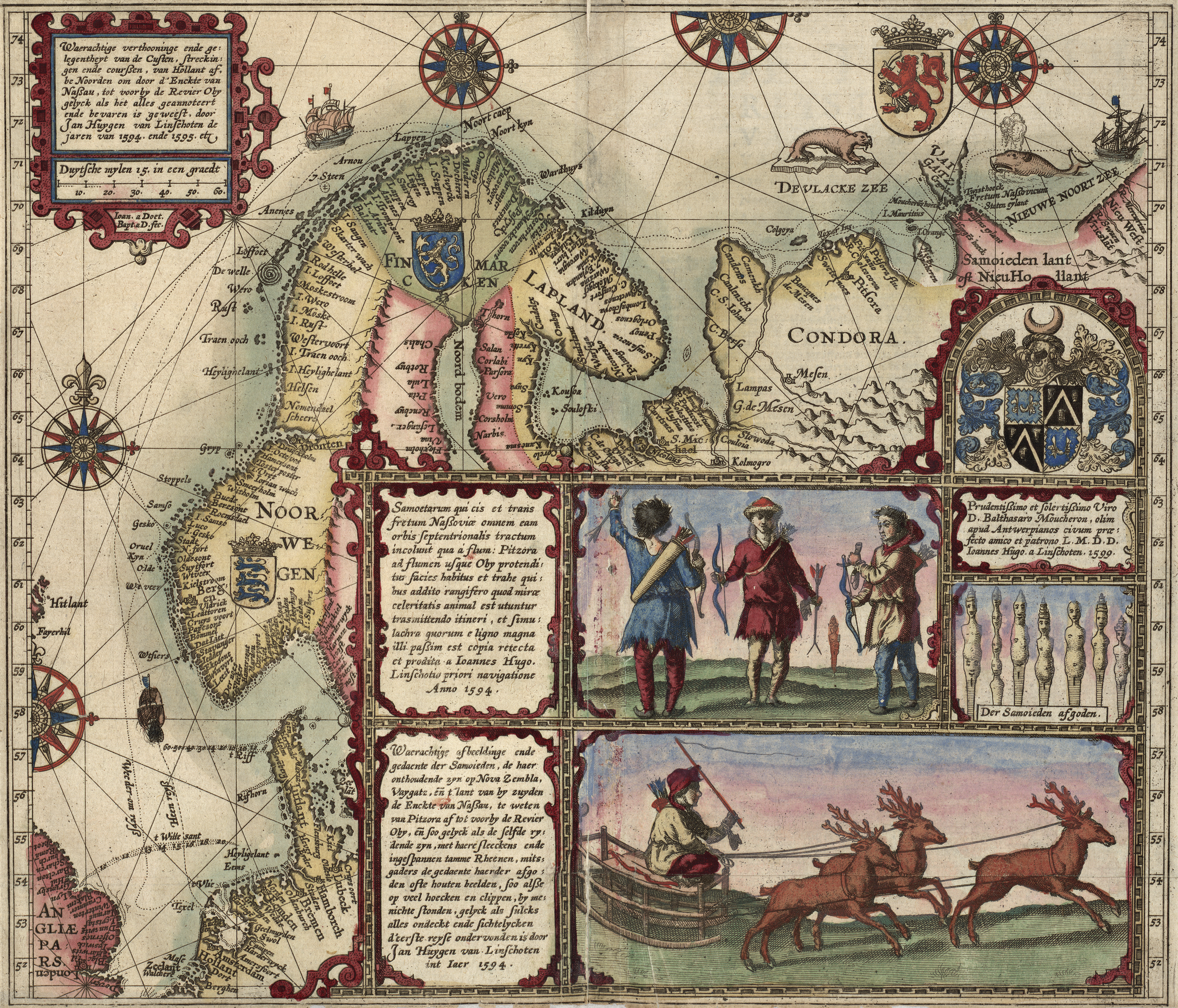
Map of Willem Barentsz' first voyage

On 5 June 1594, Barentsz left the island of Texel aboard the small ship Mercury, as part of a group of three ships sent out in separate directions to try to enter the Kara Sea, with the hopes of finding the Northeast Passage above Siberia. Between 23 and 29 June, Barentsz stayed at Kildin Island.

On 9 July, the crew encountered a polar bear for the first time. After shooting and wounding it with a musket when it tried to climb aboard the ship, the seamen decided to capture it with the hope of bringing it back to Holland. Once leashed and brought aboard the ship however, the bear rampaged and had to be killed. This occurred in Bear Creek, Williams Island.

Upon discovering the Orange Islands, the crew came across a herd of approximately 200 walruses and tried to kill them with hatchets and pikes. Finding the task more difficult than they imagined, cold steel shattering against the tough hides of the animals, they left with only a few ivory tusks.

Barentsz reached the west coast of Novaya Zemlya, and followed it northward before being forced to turn back in the face of large icebergs. Although they did not reach their ultimate goal, the trip was considered a success.

Jan Huyghen van Linschoten was a member of this expedition and the second.

=== Second voyage ===
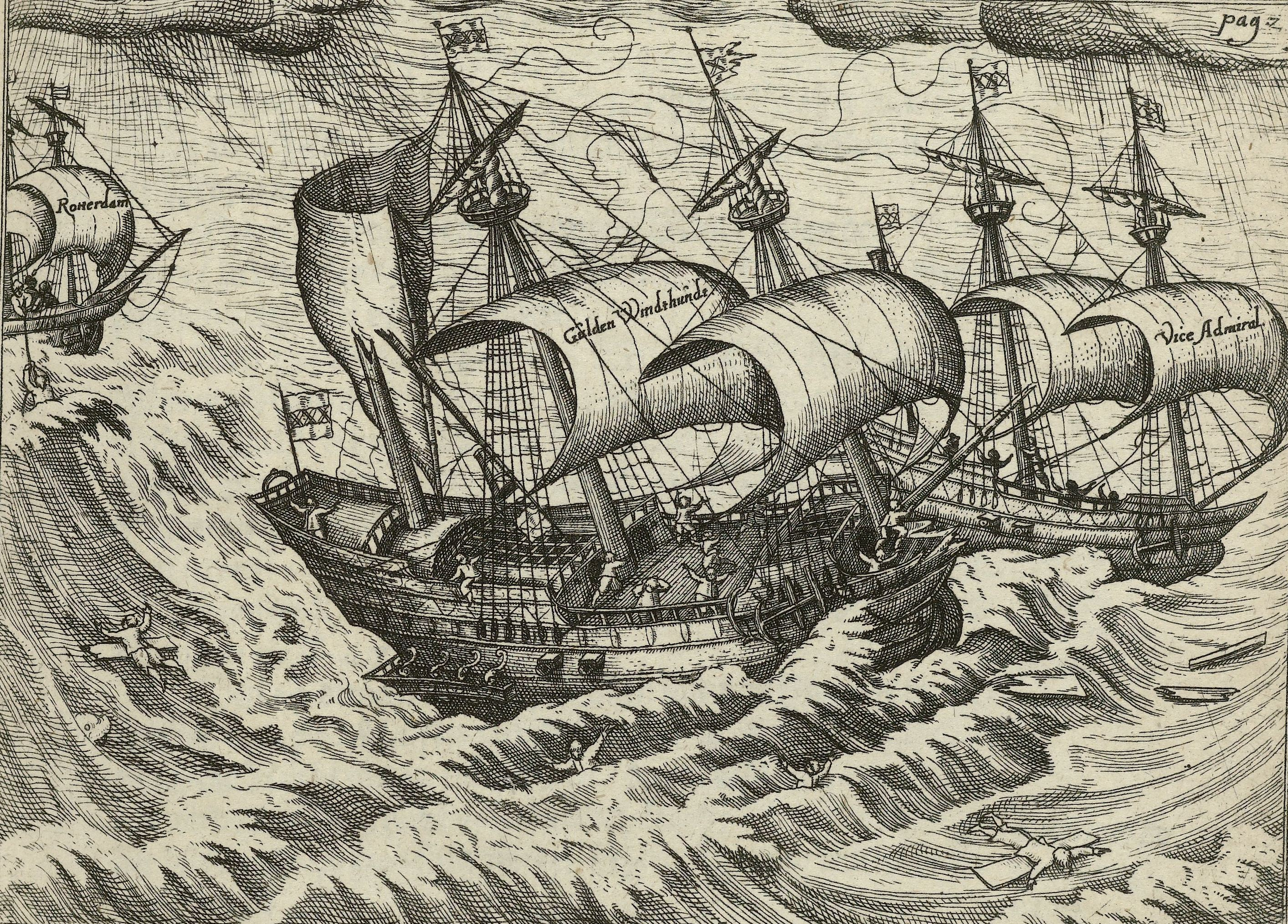
Barentz flagship Gulden Windthunde nearly collided with that of the Vice Admiral on the second voyage 6 August 1595

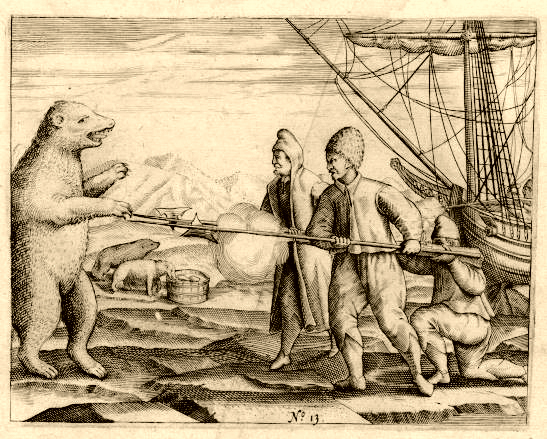
Crew of Willem Barentsz fighting a polar bear

The following year, Prince Maurice of Orange was filled with "the most exaggerated hopes" on hearing of Barentsz' previous voyage, and named him chief pilot and conductor of a new expedition, which was accompanied by six ships loaded with merchant wares that the Dutch hoped to trade with China.

Setting out on 2 June 1595, the voyage went between the Siberian coast and Vaygach Island. On 30 August, the party came across approximately 20 Samoyed "wild men" with whom they were able to speak, due to a crewmember speaking their language. 4 September saw a small crew sent to States Island to search for a type of crystal that had been noticed earlier. The party was attacked by a polar bear, and two sailors were killed.

Eventually, the expedition turned back upon discovering that unexpected weather had left the Kara Sea frozen. This expedition was largely considered to be a failure.

=== Third voyage ===
Map of the entire Arctic from Willem Barentsz's third voyage

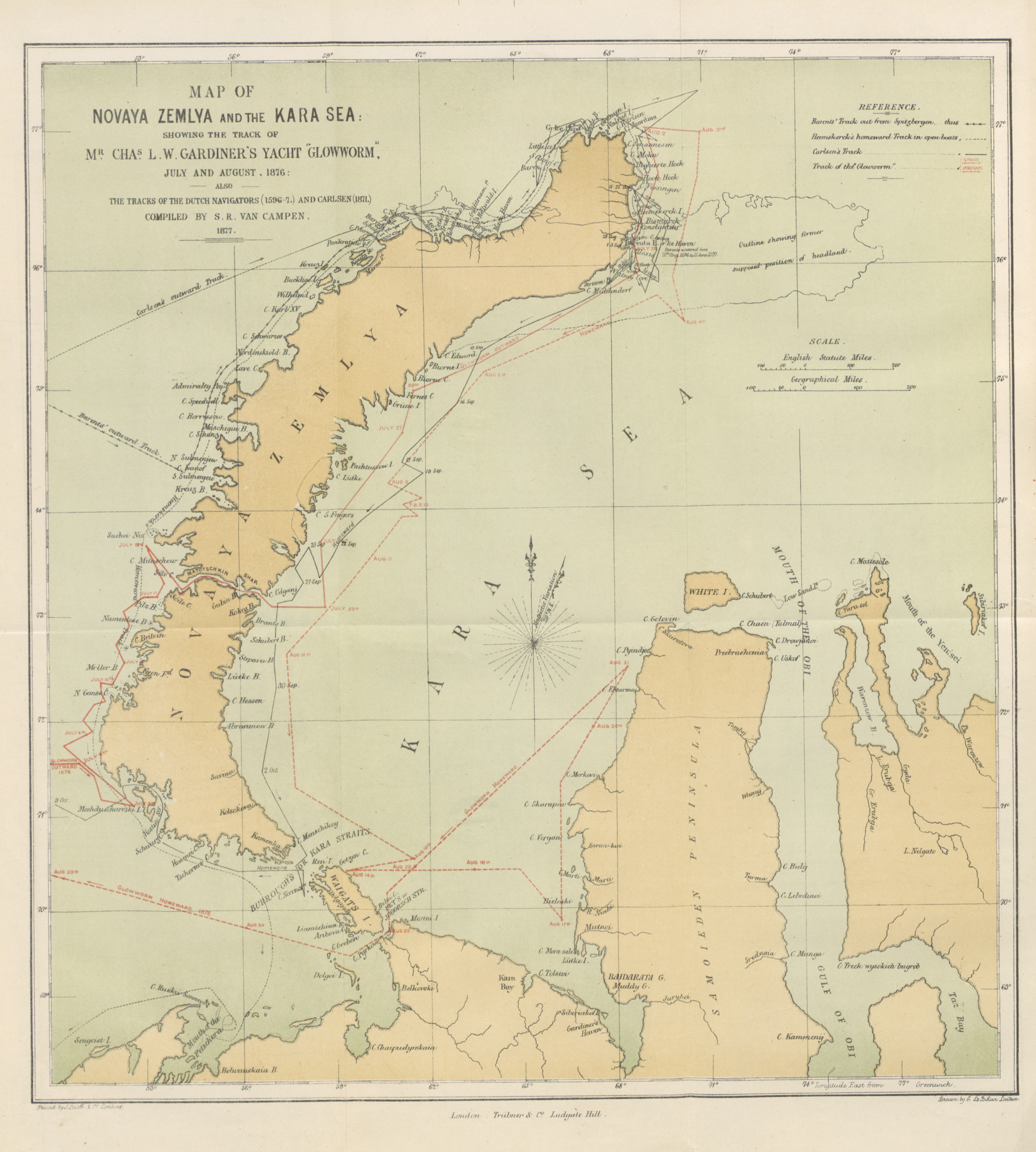
The tracks of the Dutch navigators (1596–97)

In 1596, disappointed by the failure of previous expeditions, the States-General announced they would no longer subsidize similar voyages – but instead offered a high reward for anybody who successfully navigated the Northeast Passage. The Town Council of Amsterdam purchased and outfitted two small ships, captained by Jan Rijp and Jacob van Heemskerk, to search for the elusive channel under the command of Barentsz. They set off on 10 May or 15 May, and on 9 June discovered Bear Island.

They discovered Spitsbergen on 17 June, sighting its northwest coast. On 20 June they saw the entrance of a large bay, later called Raudfjorden. On 21 June they anchored between Cloven Cliff and Vogelsang, where they "set up a post with the arms of the Dutch upon it." On 25 June they entered Magdalenefjorden, which they named Tusk Bay, in light of the walrus tusks they found there. The following day, 26 June, they sailed into the northern entrance of Forlandsundet, but were forced to turn back because of a shoal, which led them to call the fjord Keerwyck ("inlet where one is forced to turn back"). On 28 June they rounded the northern point of Prins Karls Forland, which they named Vogelhoek, on account of the large number of birds they saw there. They sailed south, passing Isfjorden and Bellsund, which were labelled on Barentsz's chart as Grooten Inwyck and Inwyck.

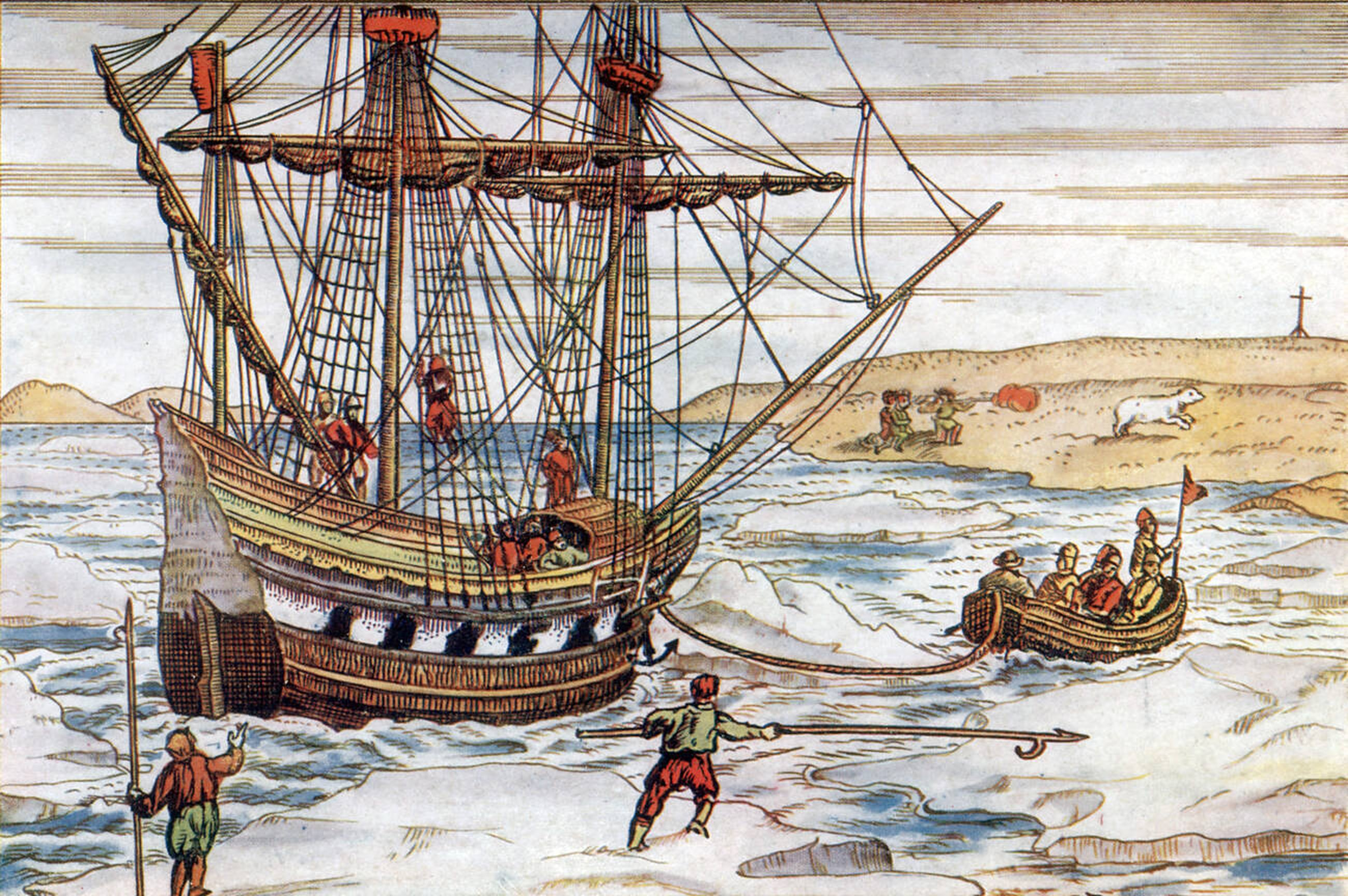
Willem Barentsz's ship amidst the Arctic ice

The ships once again found themselves at Bear Island on 1 July, which led to a disagreement between Barentsz and Van Heemskerk on one side and Rijp on the other. They agreed to part ways, with Barentsz continuing northeast, while Rijp headed due north in an attempt to cross directly over the north pole to reach China. Barentsz reached Novaya Zemlya on 17 July. Anxious to avoid becoming entrapped in the surrounding ice, he intended to head for the Vaigatch Strait, but their ship became stuck within the many icebergs and floes. Stranded, the 16-man crew was forced to spend the winter on a barren bluff. After a failed attempt to melt the permafrost, the crew used driftwood and lumber from the ship to build a 7.8×5.5-metre lodge they called Het Behouden Huys (The Saved House).

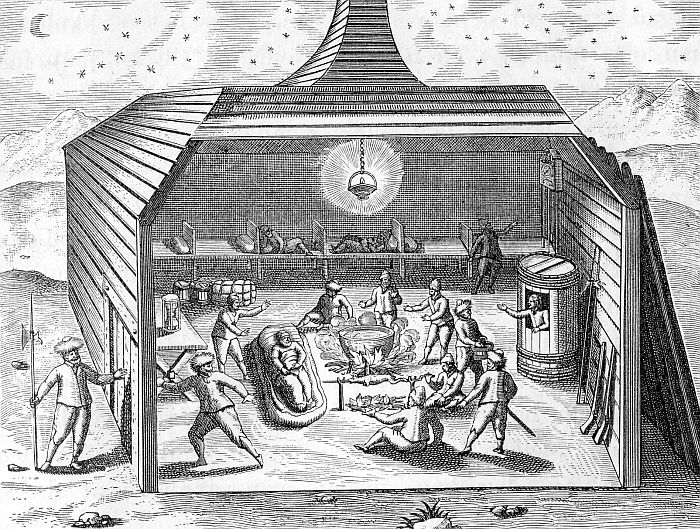
Het Behouden Huys on Novaya Zemlya

Dealing with extreme cold, the crew realised that their socks would burn before their feet could even feel the warmth of a fire – and took to sleeping with warmed stones and cannonballs. They used the merchant fabrics aboard the ship to make additional blankets and clothing. The ship bore salted beef, butter, cheese, bread, barley, peas, beans, groats, flour, oil, vinegar, mustard, salt, beer, wine, brandy, hardtack, smoked bacon, ham and fish. Much of the beer froze, bursting the casks. By 8 November Gerrit de Veer, the ship's carpenter who kept a diary, reported a shortage of beer and bread, with wine being rationed four days later.

In January 1597, the crew became the first to witness and record the atmospheric anomaly of a polar mirage, now coined the Novaya Zemlya effect due to this sighting.

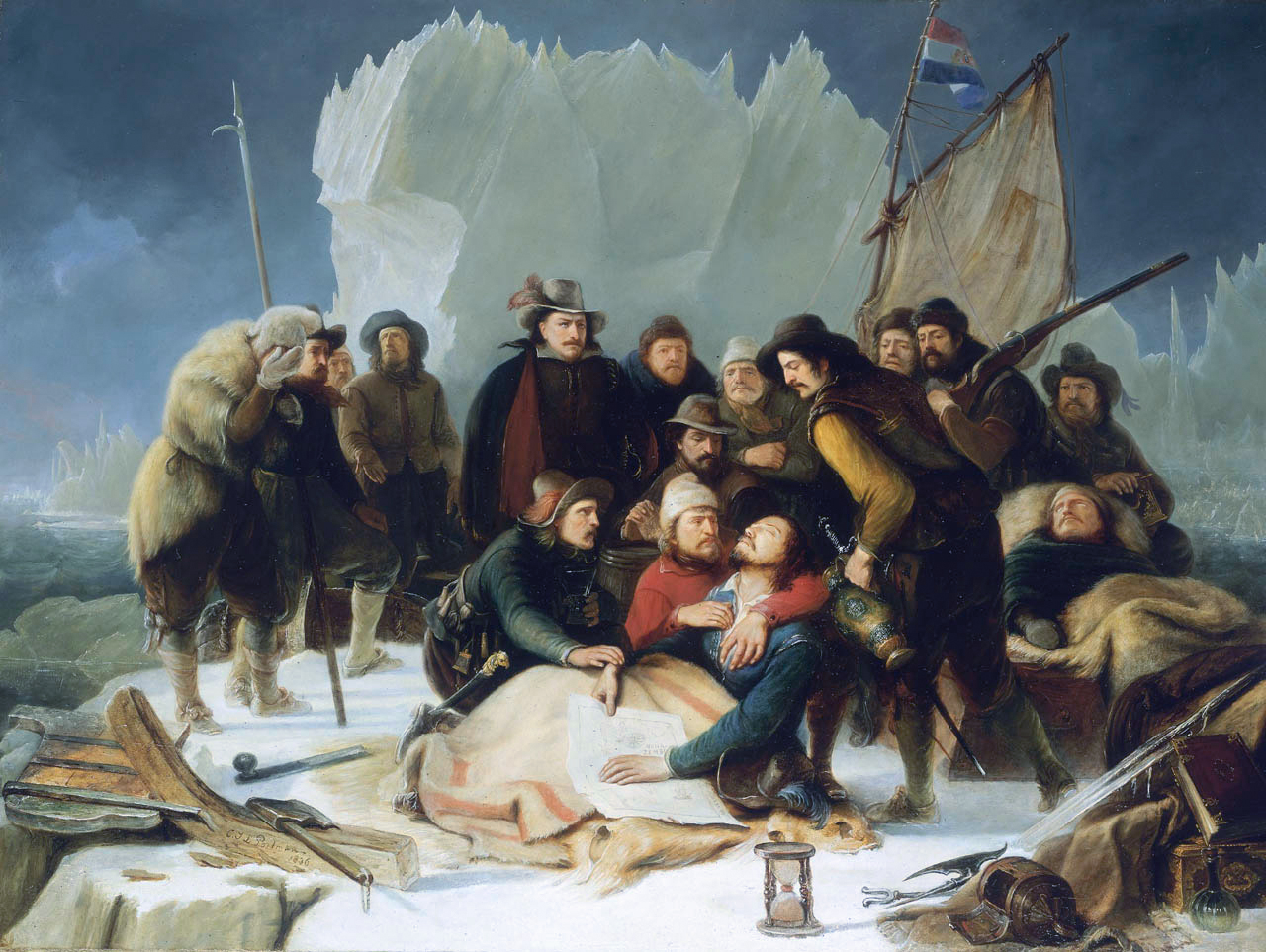
The Death of Willem Barentsz (1836) by Christiaan Julius Lodewyck Portman

Proving somewhat successful at hunting, the group caught Arctic foxes in primitive traps. The raw flesh of the Arctic fox contains small amounts of vitamin C, which, unknown to the sailors, reduced the effects of scurvy. The crew were continually attacked by polar bears that infested the area where they camped. The bears turned the stranded and now empty ship into a wintertime abode. Primitive guns usually did not kill the bears on first or even second shot (unless well aimed at the heart) and were difficult to aim, while the cold and brittle metal weapons often shattered or bent.

By early June, after months of wintering on Novaya Zemlya, the ice still held the ship fast. The remaining survivors, weakened by scurvy, set out in two open boats. They moved south along the coast, at times rowing and at times hauling the boats over the ice. Barentsz died soon after on 20 June 1597 at about 47 years of age. "After he had drunk, he suddenly fell sick, and in a short time died," wrote Gerrit de Veer. It is not known whether he was buried on the northern island of Novaya Zemlya or at sea.

Over the next seven weeks the survivors continued south and reached the Kola Peninsula. There they were rescued by a Dutch merchant vessel commanded by Rijp. He had believed the crew to be lost and encountered them by chance on a later voyage. By that time only 12 men remained. The return journey lasted about five months and they did not reach Amsterdam until 1 November 1597.

Sources differ on the losses during the return journey. Some accounts state that two men died on the ice floe and three in the boats. Others report that three died on the ice floe and two in the boats. A young cabin boy had died earlier during the winter in the shelter.

== Excavation and findings ==
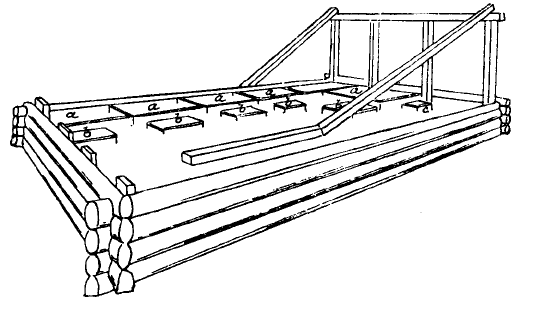
The remains of the wooden lodge of Willem Barentsz on Novaya Zemlya, sketched by Elling Carlsen in 1871

Nearly three centuries later, in 1871, the Norwegian seal hunter Elling Carlsen found the lodge still standing and largely undisturbed. He sketched the building and recorded the objects left inside, including two copper cooking pots, a barrel, a tool chest, a clock, a crowbar, a flute, clothing, two empty chests, a cooking tripod, and a number of pictures.

Further objects were removed in the 1870s. Captain Gunderson visited the site on 17 August 1875 and collected a grappling iron, two maps, and a handwritten translation of the voyages of Arthur Pet and Charles Jackman.

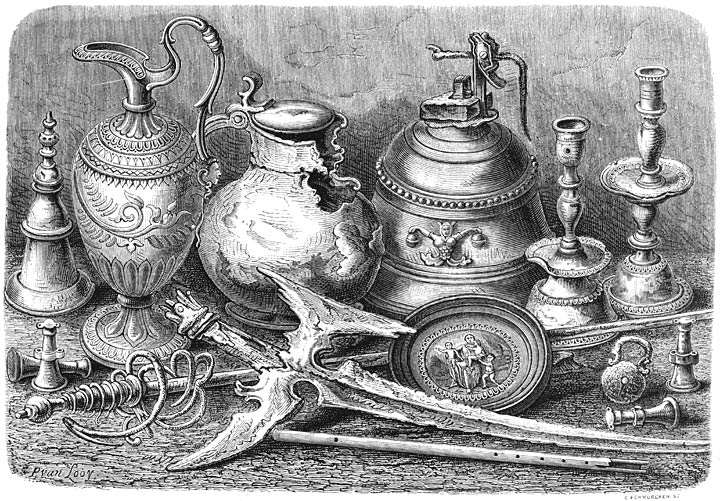
Objects found in Het Behouden Huys

Charles L. W. Gardiner followed on 29 July 1876 and recovered 112 objects, including a message left by Barentsz and Jacob van Heemskerck describing their wintering for future visitors. These finds were later transferred to the Rijksmuseum Amsterdam, after some had first been held in The Hague.

The site was investigated again in the 20th century. Finds made in 1933 by the amateur archaeologist Miloradovich are now held in the Arctic and Antarctic Museum in St. Petersburg. Dmitriy Kravchenko returned to the site several times in 1977, 1979, and 1980. He sent divers to search for the wreck of the ship and recovered additional objects, now held in the Arkhangelsk Regional Museum of Local Lore (Russia). A smaller collection is held at the Polar Museum in Tromsø (Norway).

== Commemoration and legacy ==
In 1992, an expedition of three scientists, a journalist and two photographers commissioned by the Arctic Centre at the University of Groningen, coupled with two scientists, a cook and a doctor sent by the Arctic and Antarctic Research Institute in St. Petersburg, returned to the site, and erected a commemorative marker at the site of the cabin.

The location of Barentsz' wintering on the ice floes has become a tourist destination for icebreaker cruiseships operating from Murmansk.

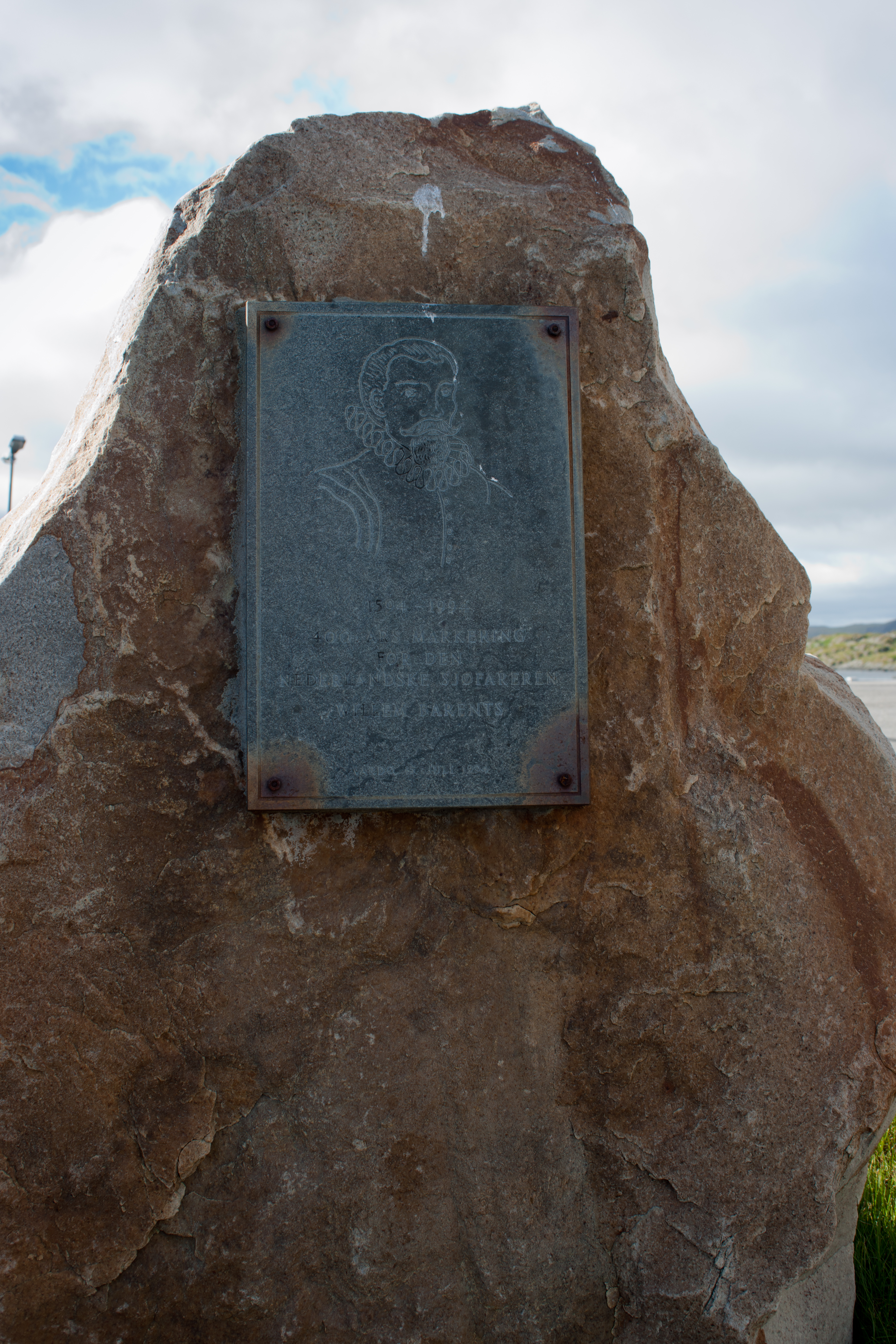
Memorial to Barentsz in Vardø Municipality, Norway.

Two of Barentsz' crewmembers later published their journals, Jan Huyghen van Linschoten who had accompanied him on the first two voyages, and Gerrit de Veer who had acted as the ship's carpenter on the last two voyages.

In 1853, the former Murmean Sea was renamed Barents Sea in his honour. Barentsburg, the second largest settlement on Svalbard, Barentsøya (Barents Island) and the Barents Region were also named after Barentsz.

In the late 19th century, the Maritime Institute Willem Barentsz was opened on Terschelling.

In 1878, the Netherlands christened the Willem Barentsz Arctic exploration ship.

In 1931, Nijgh & Van Ditmar published a play written by Albert Helman about Barentsz' third voyage, although it was never performed.

In 1946, the whaling ship Pan Gothia was re-christened the Willem Barentsz. In 1953, the second Willem Barentsz whaling ship was produced.

A protein in the molecular structure of the fruit fly was named Barentsz, in honour of the explorer.

Dutch filmmaker Reinout Oerlemans released a film called Nova Zembla in November 2011. It is the first Dutch 3D feature film.

In 2011, a team of volunteers started building a replica of Barentsz' ship in the Dutch town of Harlingen. The plan was to have the ship ready by 2018, when the Tall Ships' Races was scheduled to visit Harlingen.
