= Pieter Willemsz Verhoeff =

Dutch admiral (c. 1573–1609)

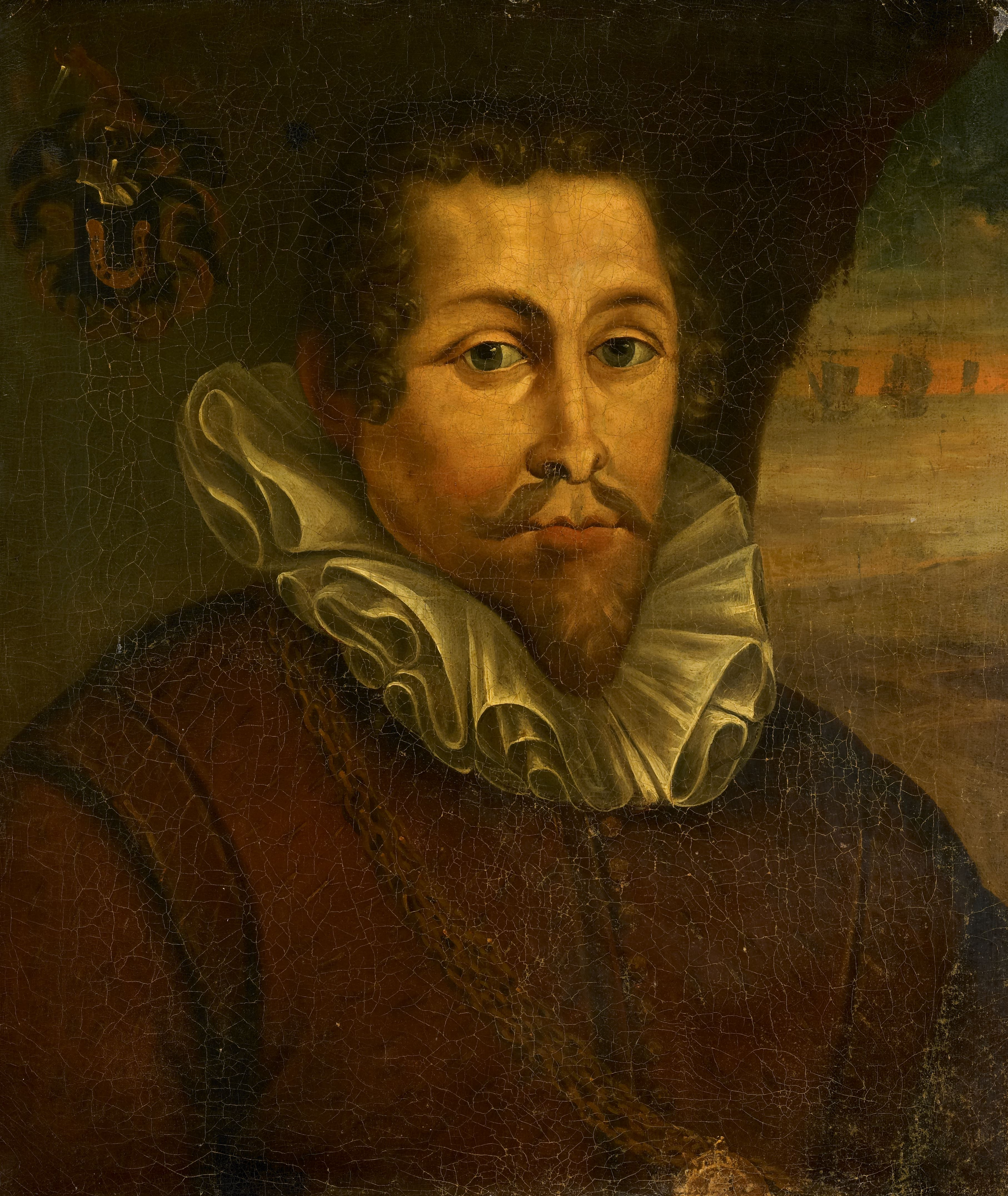
Rijksmuseum portrait

Pieter Willemsz Verhoeff (c. 1573 – 22 May 1609) was a Dutch admiral of the Admiralty of Amsterdam, notable for his voyage to Asia between 1607 and 1612.

== Biography ==
Verhoeff was in the service of the Dutch East India Company. In 1601, he was involved in the Siege of Ostend as part of the Eighty Years' War. During the Battle of Gibraltar in 1607, he was the flag captain of the Aeolus, the flagship of Admiral Jacob van Heemskerk.

A fleet of 13 ships commanded by him left Texel in December 1607, with secret orders to capture Malacca from the Portuguese. He arrived in the Strait of Malacca in 1608, and then retreated after a series of unsuccessful attempts to capture the city.

=== Death ===
In early April 1609, a Dutch fleet commanded by Verhoeff arrived at Banda Neira and wanted to force the establishment of a fortress. The Bandanese preferred free trade so that they could play off the various European countries' merchants against each other and sell their products to the highest bidder. However, the Dutch sought to establish a monopoly on the spice trade so that the Bandanese could sell their products only to the Dutch. Negotiations were arduous, and, at a certain point in late May 1609, the chieftains lured Verhoeff and two other commanders who had left their fleet to negotiate on the beach, into the woods into an ambush and killed them. Their guard was also massacred by the Bandanese, so that a total of 46 Dutchmen were killed. In retaliation, the Dutch soldiers plundered several Bandanese villages and destroyed their boats. In August, a peace favourable to the Dutch was signed: the Bandanese recognised Dutch authority and monopoly on the spice trade. This was a direct cause of the Dutch conquest of the Banda Islands (1609–1621).
