= Jan Rijp =

Dutch mariner

Jan Cornelisz Rijp (c. 1570–c. 1613) was a Dutch mariner best known for his involvement with Willem Barentsz in finding a route to the East, avoiding the Spanish and the Portuguese fleets in the South.

In May 1596, Rijp was named captain of the second of two ships commissioned to Barents by Dutch merchants to discover the fabled Northeast Passage to the East Indies. Jacob van Heemskerck captained the first ship, and Barents served as its pilot. After discovering Spitsbergen, the ships encountered pack ice blocking the way. Barents decided to turn east and round the northern tip of Novaya Zemlya, as he had successfully managed once before. When Barents urged Rijp to follow, he refused. Rijp insisted that the northern tip of Novaya Zemlya was far too dangerous and returned to the Netherlands.

Barents and his ship continued in the attempt to round Novaya Zemlya. He realized too late the wisdom of Rijp's decision and became trapped in the ice. Barents perished at sea in one of the two small tenders the crew used to escape to the Kola Peninsula, unlike Rijp, who correctly assessed the risks of the Arctic and returned to pick up the remainder of Barents' crew—including van Heemskerk—near Murmansk on his next trip in 1597.

Rijpsburg settlement on Svalbard is named for him.
