= Pet and Jackman Expedition =

English expedition to discover the Northeast Passage

Arthur Pet and Charles Jackman were English explorers. They led an expedition for the Muscovy Company to discover the Northeast Passage in 1580.

Pet was in charge of the barque George, Jackman of the barque William. They were given orders to sail to Vardø, then along the north coast of Siberia which was expected to take less than 36 days in good conditions, and from there south to China.

On 9 June [O.S. 30 May] 1580 they sailed from Harwich. On 12 July [O.S. 2 July] the two ships separated off the coast of the Kola Peninsula due to steering difficulties of the William, and arranged to meet at Vaygach Island. Pet explored the surroundings of Vaygach Island and the south of Novaya Zemlya before sailing through the Kara Strait on 27 August [O.S. 17 August]. This made them the first Western Europeans to penetrate into the Kara Sea. Pet reached as far as the bay of the Kara River where he met Jackman again. With ice blocking further progress to the east and both vessels already damaged by ice, they decided to turn back on 6 September [O.S. 27 August]. On the return journey, the ships were separated again. Both William and George reached Norway. William then disappeared, but Pet reached Ratcliff with George on 5 January [O.S. 26 December]. Pet's journal includes a sketch of the Kara Sea by Hugh Smith.
