= Gerrit de Veer =

16th-century Dutch naval officer

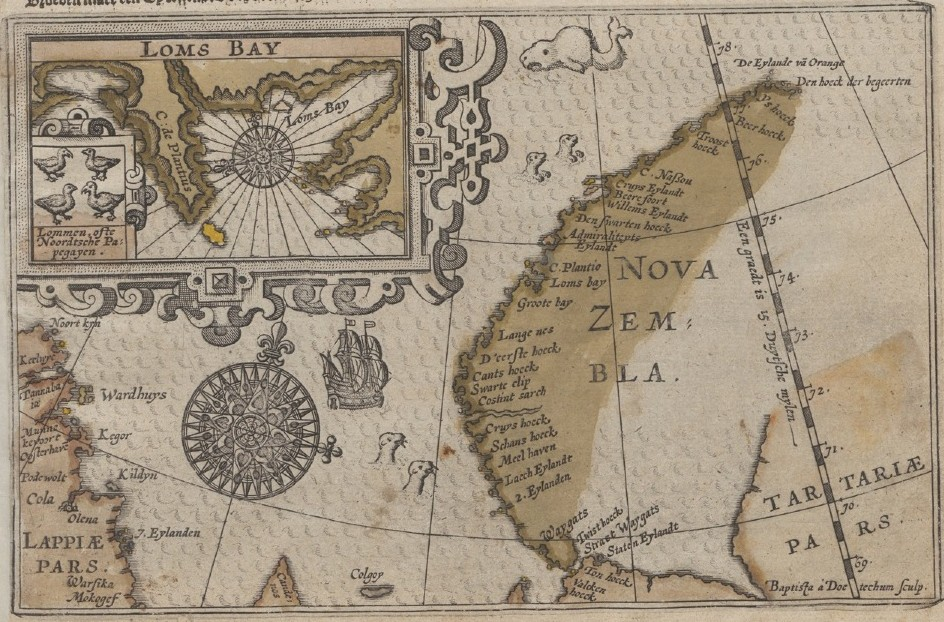
Novaya Zemlya's west coast as depicted in De Veer's diary

Gerrit de Veer (c. 1570–after 1598) was a Dutch officer on Willem Barentsz' second and third voyages of 1595 and 1596 respectively, in search of the Northeast passage.

De Veer kept a diary of the voyages and in 1597, was the first person to observe and record the Novaya Zemlya effect, and the first Westerner to observe hypervitaminosis A caused by consumption of the liver of a polar bear.

He wrote The Three Voyages of William Barents to the Arctic Regions (1594, 1595, and 1596).
