= Jacob van Heemskerck =

Dutch explorer and naval officer (1567–1607)

Jacob van Heemskerk
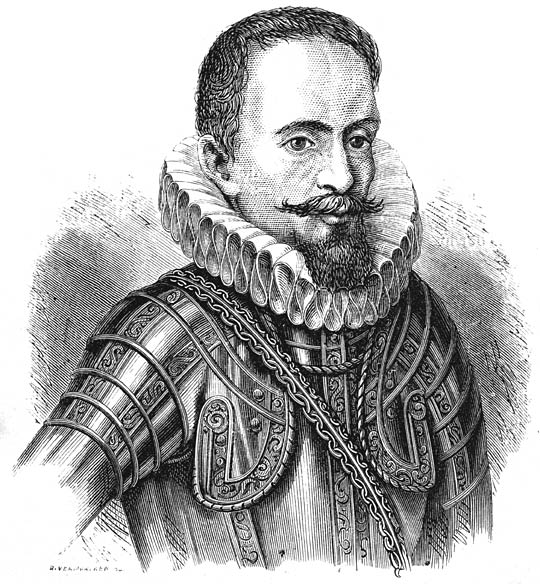
- Born: 3 March 1567; Amsterdam, Spanish Netherlands
- Died: 25 April 1607 (aged 40) aboard vessel in the Bay of Gibraltar
- Occupation: Admiral
- Known for: Exploration of the Arctic

Jacob van Heemskerck (3 March 1567 – 25 April 1607) was a Dutch explorer and naval officer. He is generally known for his victory over the Spanish at the Battle of Gibraltar, where he ultimately lost his life.

== Early life ==
Jacob van Heemskerck was born in Amsterdam in 1567. He is described as having delicate features, large brown eyes, a thin high nose, fair hair and beard, and a soft gentle expression. Under a quiet exterior and plain dress were a daring nature and indomitable ambition for military and naval distinction.

== Career ==
=== Arctic exploration ===
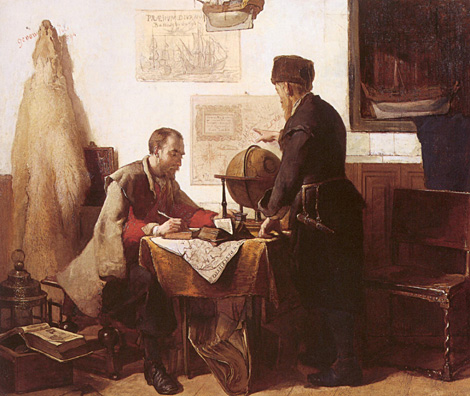
Willem Barentsz and Jacob van Heemskerck charting their route

Heemskerck's early fame arose from an attempt to discover an Arctic passage from Europe to China. Two vessels sailed from Amsterdam on 10 May 1596, under the command of Heemskerck and Jan Rijp. Willem Barentsz accompanied Heemskerck as pilot, and Gerrit de Veer, the historian of the voyage, was on board as mate.

The masses of ice in the straits leading to the Kara Sea, and the impenetrable nature of the pack near Novaya Zemlya, had suggested the advisability of avoiding the land and, by keeping a northerly course, of seeking a passage in the open sea. They sailed northwards, and, on 9 June, discovered Bear Island in the Barents Sea. Continuing on the same course they sighted a mountainous snow-covered land in about 80° N., soon afterwards being stopped by the polar pack ice. This important discovery was named Spitsbergen, and was believed—incorrectly—to be a part of Greenland.

Arriving at Bear Island again on 1 July, Rijp parted company, while Heemskerck and Barents proceeded eastward, intending to pass round the northern extreme of Novaya Zemlya. On 26 August, they reached Ice Haven, after rounding the northern extremity of the land. Here their vessel became anchored in ice and they wintered in a house built out of driftwood and planks from the tween decks and the deck-house of the vessel.

On 13 June, they made their way in two open boats to the Lapland coast; but Barents died during the voyage, on 20 June. This was the first time that an arctic winter was successfully faced; The voyage stands in the first rank among the polar enterprises of the 16th century, and led to the flourishing whale and seal fisheries which long enriched the Netherlands.

=== The East Indies ===
Heemskerck later served as a vice admiral, protecting Dutch merchant shipping on voyages to China and the Dutch East Indies and taking part in the second Dutch expedition to Indonesia. On 1 May 1598, Heemskerck set out from Texel in a fleet of eight ships bound for the East and returned to Texel on 19 May 1600. He sailed out again the following year in a combined fleet of thirteen ships with Admiral Wolphert Harmensz. The fleet split at the Azores, with Harmensz going to Mauritius and Heemskerck heading straight for the Moluccas.

On 25 February 1603, three Dutch ships under Heemskerck's command attacked and captured a Portuguese merchant carrack, Santa Catarina, near Singapore. Heemskerck acted on his own initiative: his instructions did not authorize offensive war against Portuguese shipping. He justified the seizure as retaliation for Portuguese actions against Dutch merchants in Asia.

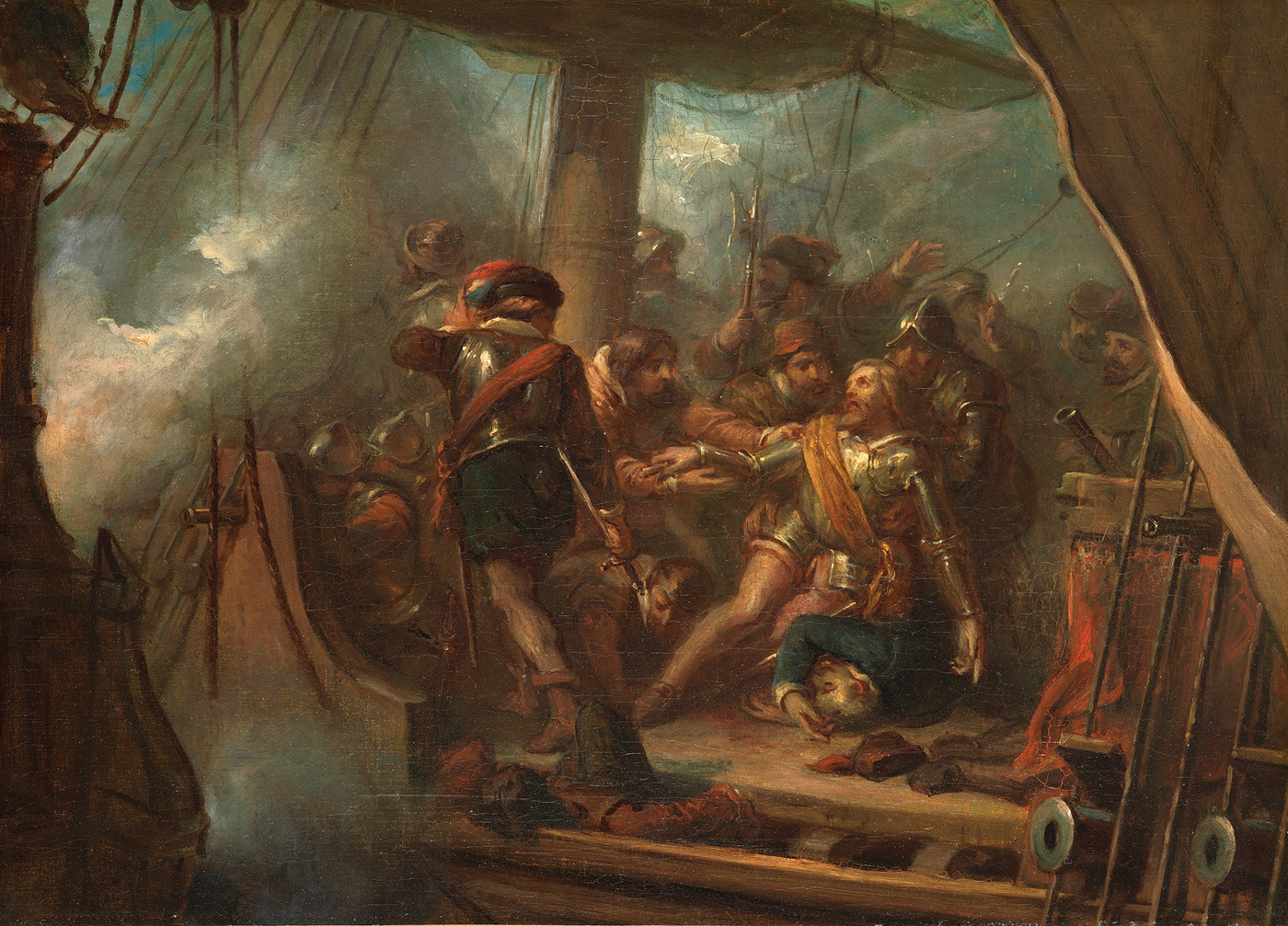
Van Heemskerck's death at the Battle of Gibraltar

J. K. J. de Jonge described Heemskerck as "less of a rough sailor, more of a Drake or a Cavendish, a gentleman adventurer, somewhat proud and lofty, but polished and afraid of naught." When reproached by a factor in Madura for risking the company's property, Heemskerck responded, "Where we risk our lives, the gentlemen of the Company must risk their ships and cargoes." He knew how to inspire his men with a blind confidence in himself. When Heemskerck was on board a vessel, the sailors felt safe. A battle they termed a "Heemskerck fight".

=== Gibraltar ===
Heemskerck died as a result of leg wounds caused by a cannonball, during the Battle of Gibraltar, an engagement in which a Spanish fleet of 21 vessels was entirely destroyed. His body was returned to Amsterdam to be buried with full honours at Oude Kerk, Amsterdam. Heemskerck's suit of armour—minus a thigh plate shattered by the fatal cannonball—is on display in the Rijksmuseum in Amsterdam.
