= Ercole Sassonia =

Italian physician

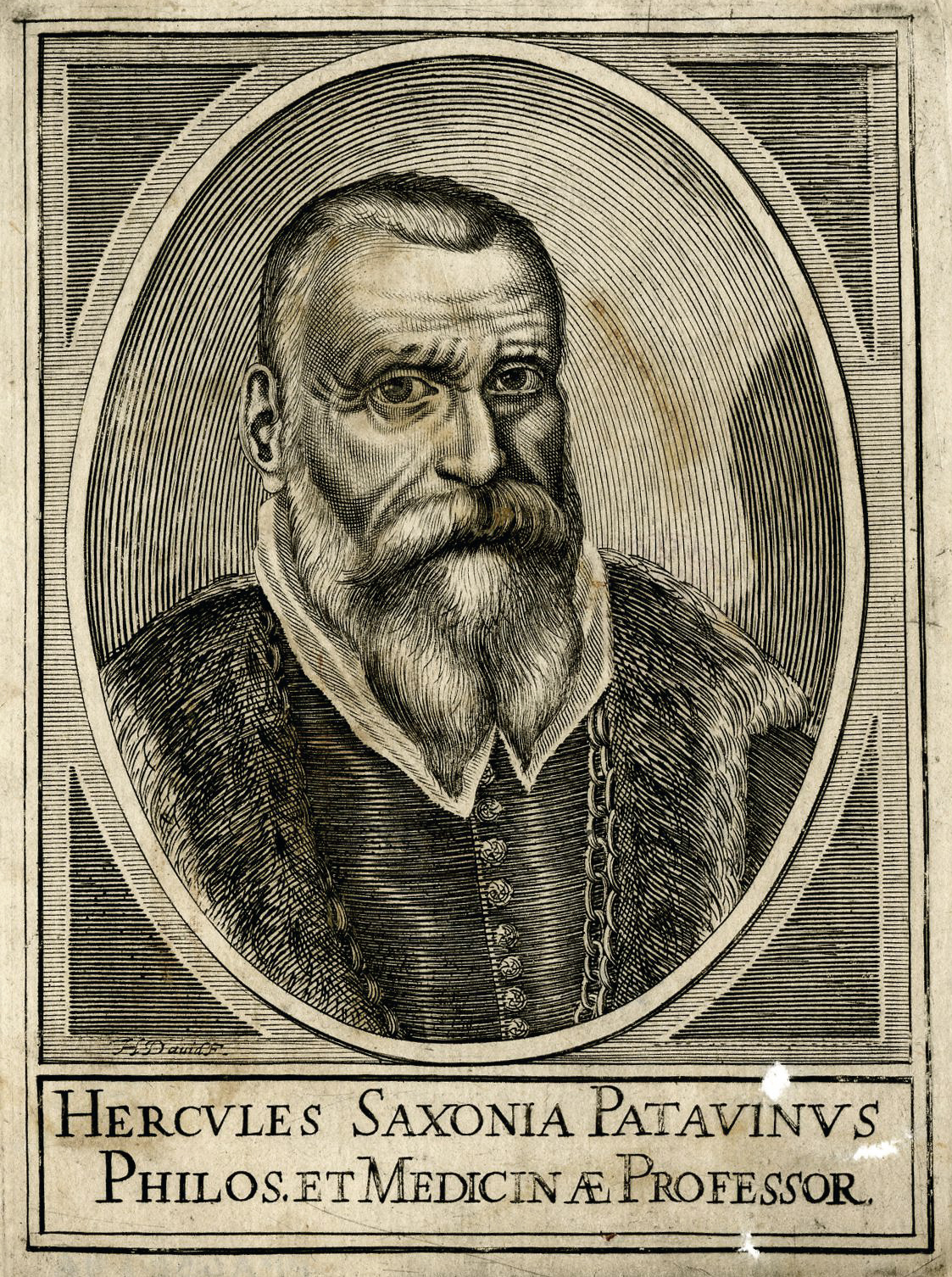
Illustration

Ercole Sassonia, also known as Hercules de Saxonia, Hercules Saxonia Patavinus, or Hercules of Saxony (1551 – August 29, 1607), was an Italian physician.

Sassoonia was born and died in Padua, and was one of the great Italian clinicians of the Renaissance. He was educated in his hometown, and graduated with a degree in medicine from the University of Padua. In 1575 he became the professor of medical practice at the university. Becoming famous as a teacher, he was invited to Vienna by Emperor Maximilian II, where he remained until 1600. His chief scientific works were in the fields of diagnostics, skin diseases, and venereal diseases.

== Chief works ==
- Disputatio de phoenigmorum, quae vulgo vesicantia appellantur, & de theriacae usu in febribus pestilentibus. In qua etiam de natura pestis, & pestilentium febrium nonnulla tractantur, Padova, Paulum Meiettum, 1591.
- De Phoenigmis libri tres. In quibus agitur de vniuersa rubificantium natura, deque differentijs omnibus atque vsu. Psilotris, smegmatibus, dropacibus, sinapsismis simplicibus, ac compositis vulgo vesicantibus, de quorum usu in febribus pestilentibus multa disputantur, 1593.
- Luis venereae perfectissimus tractatus, Padova, Paulum Meiettum, 1597.
- De plica quam Poloni Gwozdziec, Roxolani Koltunum vocant. Liber nunc primum in lucem editus, Padova, Officina Laurentii Pasquati, 1600.
- Opera Practica, 1607.
- Prognoseon praticarum, 1620.

== Bibliography ==
- Castiglioni A., Storia della Medicina, II, Mondadori, Milano, 1948.
- Pazzini A., Storia della Medicina, I, Società Editrice Libraria, Milano, 1947, pp. 697, 698.
- Voce: Ercole Sassonia in Enciclopedia Italiana, XXXth, Istituto della Enciclopedia Italiana, Roma, 1936, p. 896.
- Voce Ercole Sassonia in Enciclopedia Biografica Universale Treccani, XXVIIth, p. 250, Istituto della Enciclopedia Italiana, Roma, 2007.
