= Jean-Jacques Renouard de Villayer =

French postal pioneer

Jean-Jacques Renouard, seigneur de Villayer (24 June 1607, Nantes – 5 March 1691, Paris) was a member of the French Conseil d'État, which had been delegated special legal authorities by the absolutist reigning King Louis XIV.

In 1653 as the tenant of the Paris City Post, Renouard de Villayer ordered post boxes to be set up at different places in Paris. Letters, prepaid with a uniform postage of 1 sol, could be put in these boxes and were then delivered inside of the city within the same day. The receipts (billet de port payé), that were issued for this purpose and had to be attached to the letters as postage, are considered to be early precursors of the postage stamp. There are no examples still existing today. The so-called Petite Poste was an economic failure, but was later successfully imitated in other European cities (for example by the London Penny Post as of 1680).

In 1659, Renouard de Villayer became a member of the Académie française, succeeding Abel Servien.

In 1944, the family coat of arms of Renouard de Villayer was depicted on a commemorative stamp by La Poste, the French post office, on the Day of the Postage Stamp.
