= Battle of Gibraltar (1607) =

Eighty Years' war naval battle

Coordinates: 36.138887°N 5.398607°W

- Part of the Eighty Years' War
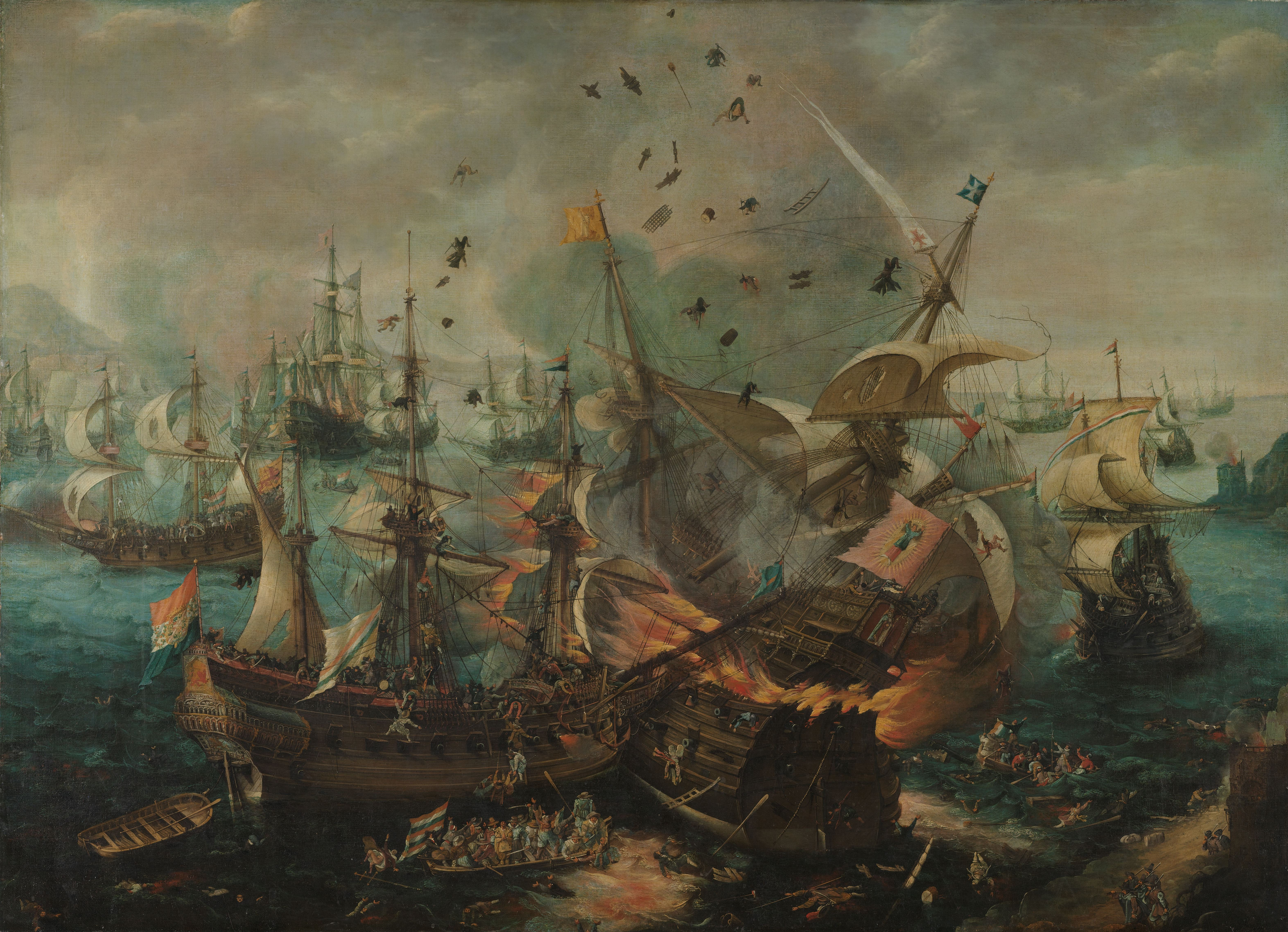
- Battle of Gibraltar by Cornelis van Wieringen
Date	25 April 1607
Location	Bay of Gibraltar
Result	Dutch victory: Twelve Years' Truce

Belligerents
Dutch Republic	Spain

Commanders and leaders
(Dutch Republic) Jacob van Heemskerk †	(Spain) Juan Álvarez de Avilés †

Strength
26 warships	10 galleons ± 12 smaller warships

Casualties and losses
100 killed 60 wounded	350–4,000 killed 5–10 galleons 9–12 smaller warships

The naval Battle of Gibraltar took place on 25 April 1607, during the Eighty Years' War, when a Dutch fleet surprised and engaged a Spanish fleet anchored at the Bay of Gibraltar. During the four hours of action, most of the Spanish ships were destroyed.

== Forces ==
A Dutch fleet of 26 warships was led by Admiral Jacob van Heemskerck. The Dutch flagship was Æolus (of the Zeeland Admiralty). Other Dutch ships were De Roode Leeuw (also of the Zeeland Admiralty, and flagship of Vice-Admiral Laurens Jacobszoon Alteras), De Tijger (of the Maas Admiralty, and flagship of Rear-Admiral Lambert Hendrikszoon), De Zeehond, De Griffioen, De Gouden Leeuw, De Zwarte Beer, De Witte Beer, and De Ochtendster.

A Spanish fleet of 21 ships, including 10 galleons, was led by Don Juan Álvarez de Avilés. The Spanish flagship San Augustin was commanded by Don Juan's son. Other ships were Nuestra Señora de la Vega and Madre de Dios. The Spanish fleet was covered by a fortress, although the Dutch fleet was out of range of its guns at all times and the fortress guns were not able to affect the battle.

== Battle ==
The battle

Van Heemskerk left some of his ships at the bay entrance to prevent the escape of any Spanish ships. Twenty from the Dutch fleet were ordered to focus on the Spanish galleons while the rest attacked the smaller vessels. Van Heemskerk was killed during the first approach on the Spanish flagship as a cannonball severed his leg. The Dutch then doubled up on the galleons and a few of the galleons caught fire. One exploded due to a shot that penetrated its powder magazine. The Dutch captured the Spanish flagship but let it go adrift.

Following the destruction of the Spanish ships, the Dutch deployed boats and killed hundreds of swimming Spanish sailors. The Dutch lost 100 men including Admiral Van Heemskerk. Sixty Dutch were wounded. Depending on the sources, most or all of the Spanish ships were lost and between 350 and 4,000 Spaniards were killed or captured. Álvarez de Avilés was amongst the dead.

== Consequences ==
The battle was a leading driver of the Twelve Years' Truce, under which the Dutch Republic achieved de facto recognition by the Spanish Crown.

The battle had an important indirect effect on the History of Ireland, specifically the key event known as "Flight of the Earls". Hugh O'Neill, 2nd Earl of Tyrone, and Rory O'Donnell, 1st Earl of Tyrconnell, left Ulster in Ireland with the intention of getting a Spanish army to invade Ireland on their behalf. The destruction of the Spanish fleet ruled out any such option, and the Earls found themselves in irrevocable exile – with major consequences for the later history of Ireland, and especially of Ulster.

== Gallery ==
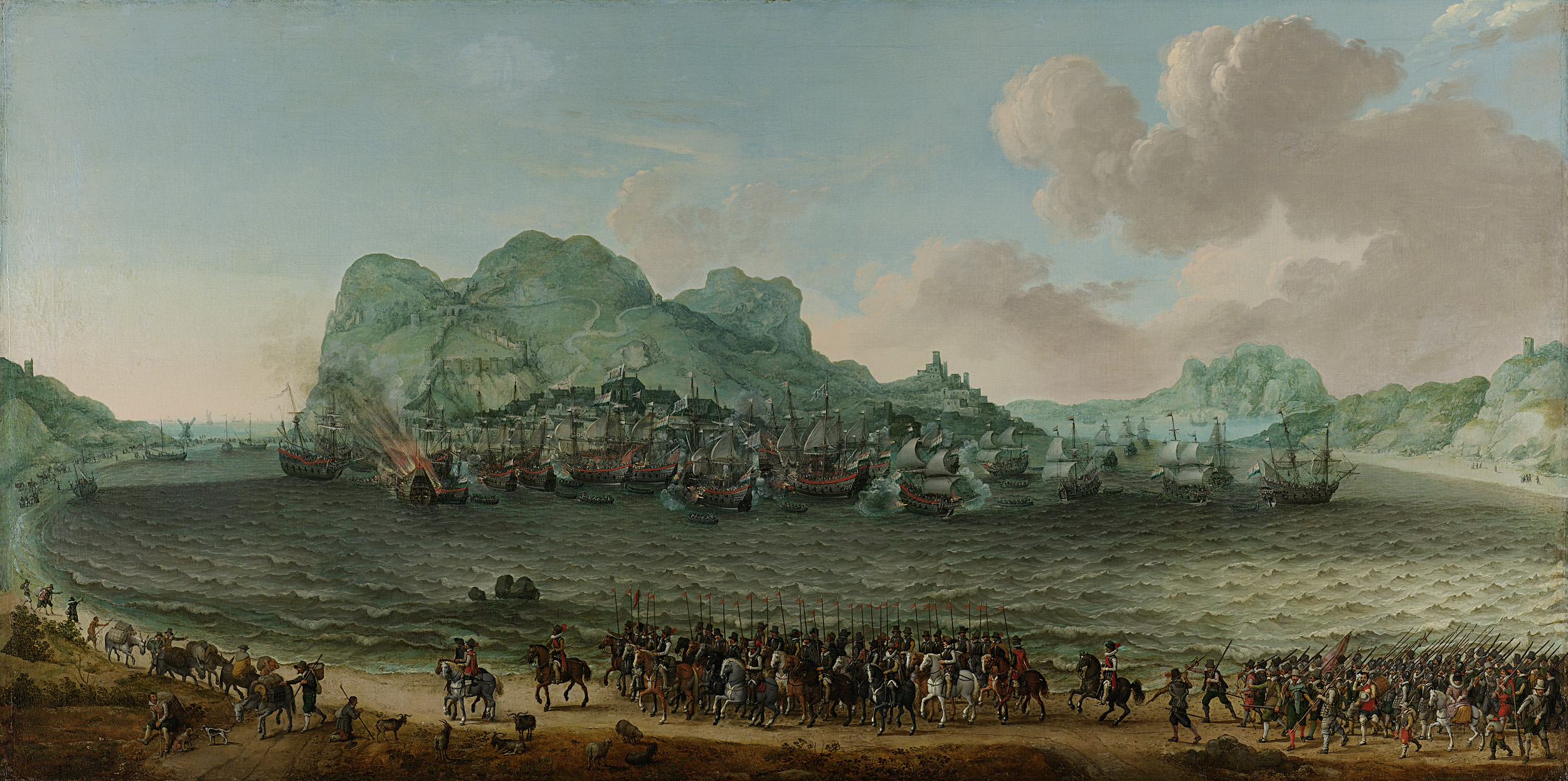

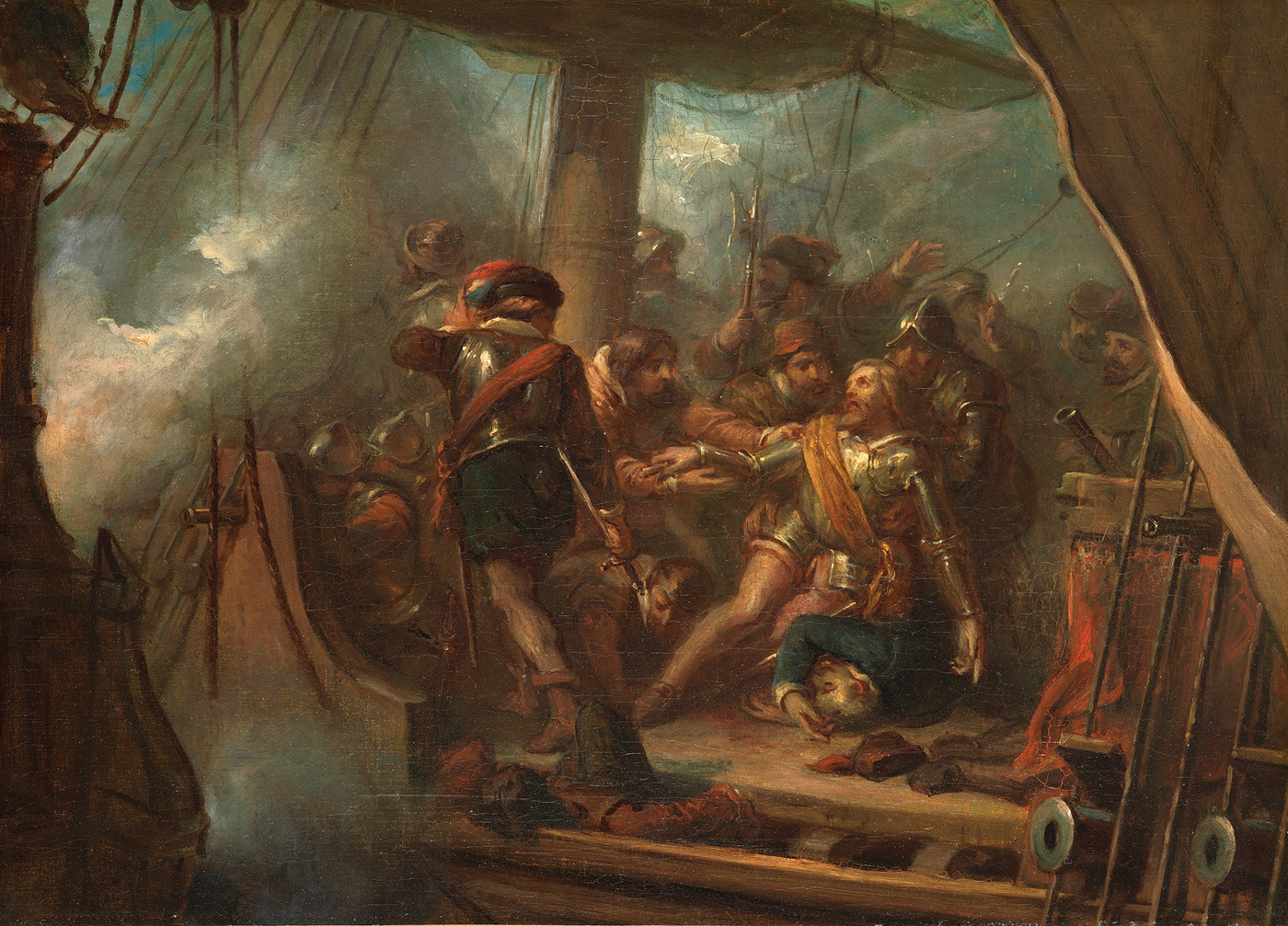

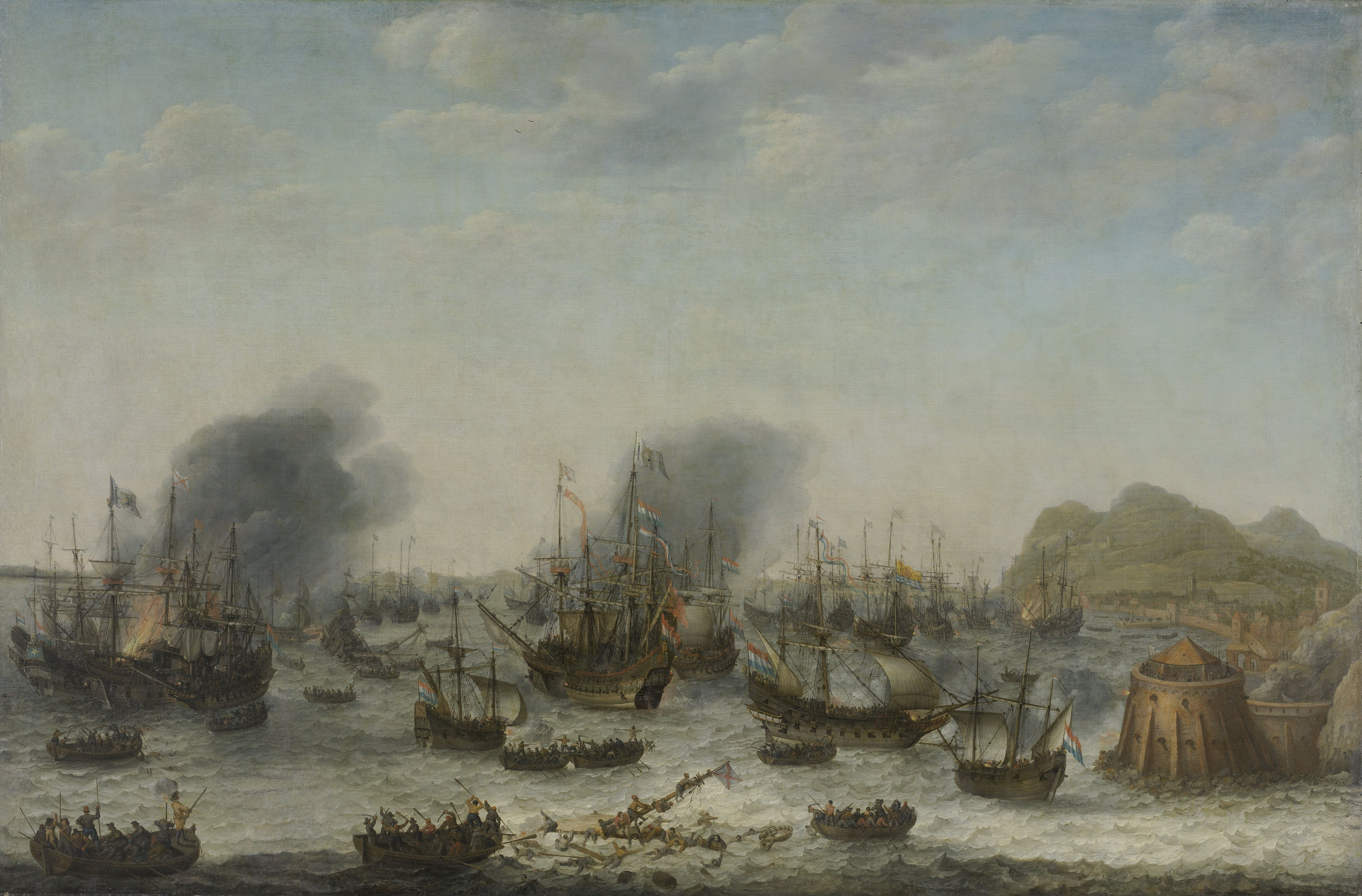

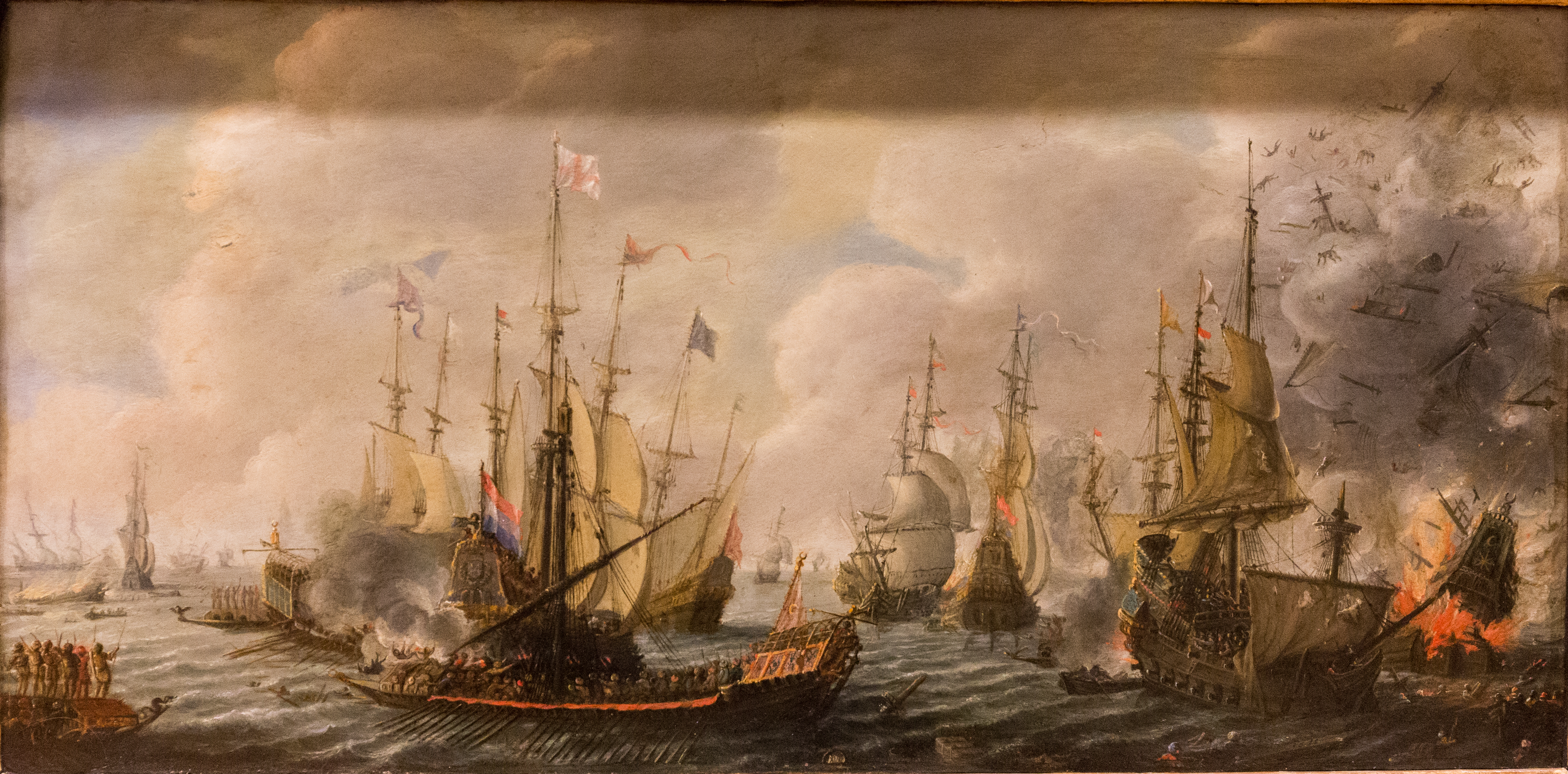

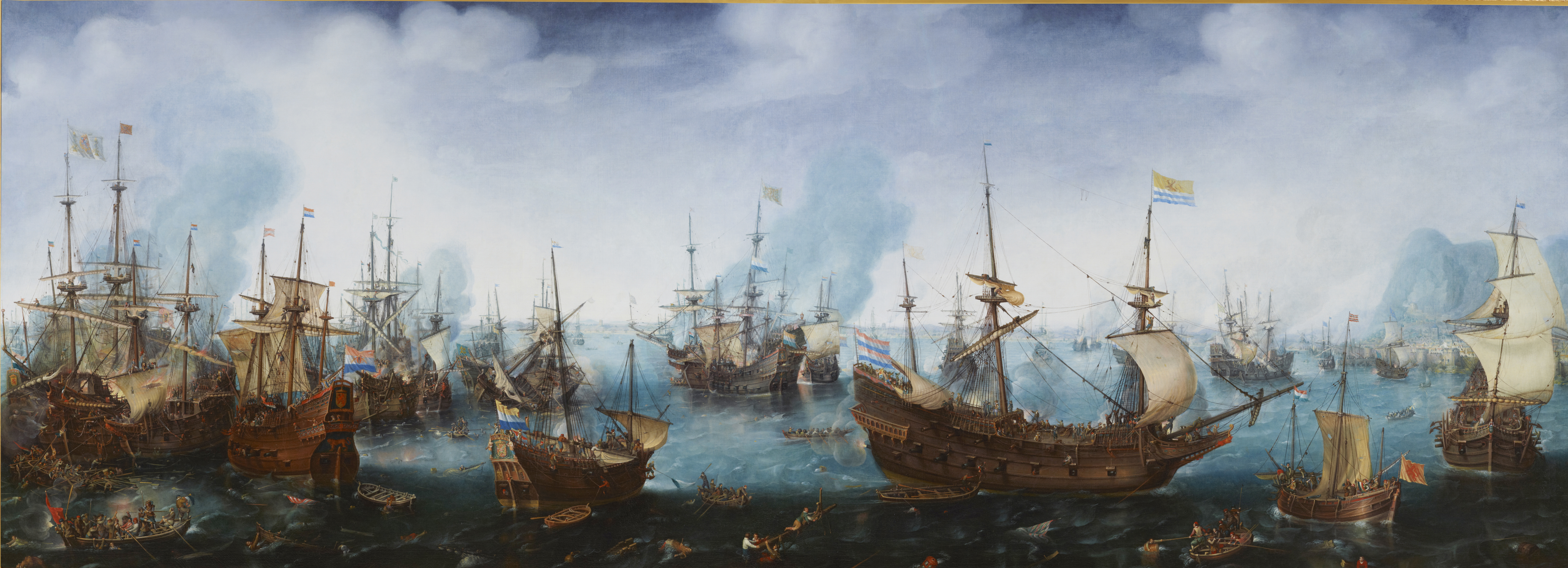

== Sources ==
- Allen, Paul C. (2000). Philip III and the Pax Hispanica, 1598–1621: The Failure of Grand Strategy. Yale Historical Publications Series. New Haven: Yale University Press. ISBN 978-0300087185.
- Fernández, C. (1898). Armada Española desde la unión de los reinos de Castilla y Aragón (in Spanish). Madrid: Rivedeneyra.
- Vere, F. (1955). Salt in their Blood: the lives of the famous Dutch admirals.
- Lenihan, Pádraig (2014). Consolidating Conquest: Ireland 1603–1727. Longman History of Ireland. London: Routledge. ISBN 978-1138825819.
- De Jonge, J. C. Geschiedenis van het Nederlandse zeewezen (in Dutch).
- Akveld, L. M.; et al. (1973). Vier Eeuwen Varen (in Dutch).
- Warnsinck, J. C. M. (1941). Twaalf Doorluchtige Zeehelden (in Dutch).
