= Lenin (1916 icebreaker) =

Russian and Soviet icebreaker

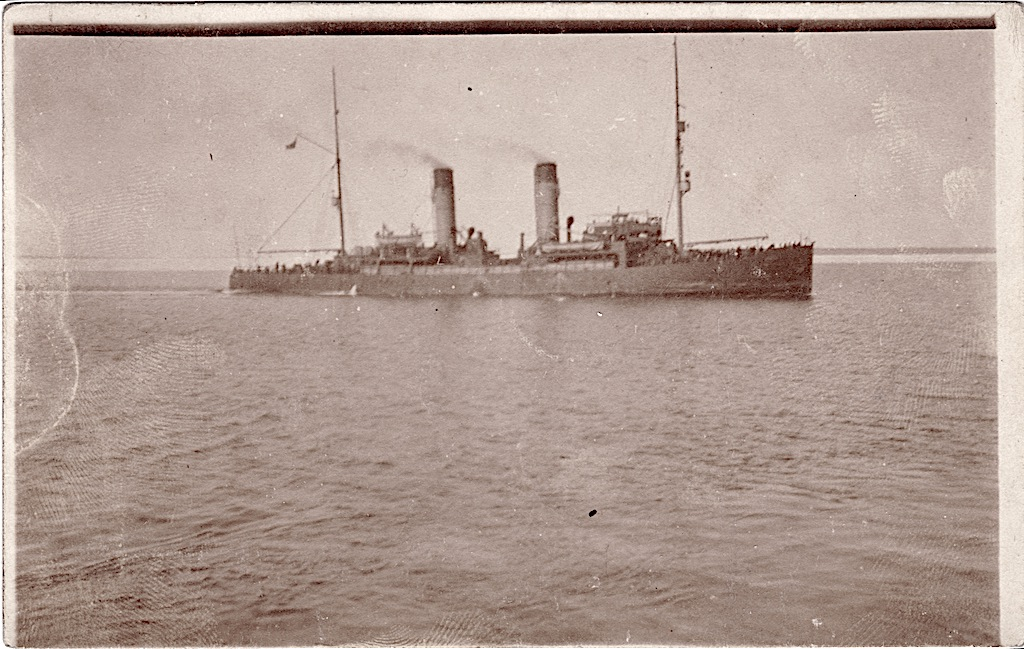
- The ship as Lenin

History

United Kingdom
- Name: HMS Alexander
- Builder: Armstrong Whitworth, Low Walker
- Yard number: 905
- Laid down: June 1916
- Launched: 23 December 1916
- Completed: June 1917
- Commissioned: September 1917
- Decommissioned: 1919
- Fate: Handed over to White Russian forces, 1919

Soviet Union
- Name: 1919: Lenin; 1957: Vladimir Ilich Lenin
- Namesake: Vladimir Lenin
- Acquired: c.1919
- Out of service: 1968
- Fate: Scrapped, 1977

General characteristics
- Type: Icebreaker
- Tonnage: 3,375 GRT, 1,330 NRT
- Displacement: 5,600 tonnes
- Length: 264.2 ft (80.5 m)
- Beam: 64.1 ft (19.5 m)
- Draught: 21.2 ft (6.5 m)
- Installed power: 1,038 NHP
- Propulsion: 2 × screws at stern; 1 × screw at bow; 3 × triple expansion engines

Lenin (Russian: Ленин) was a Russian icebreaker originally built in England for the Russian Empire. Launched in 1916, before going into service for Russia, the ship first served in the Royal Navy during the Allied intervention in the Russian Civil War. It was eventually acquired by the Soviet Union and served through World War II, and was scrapped in 1977.

== Building ==
Armstrong Whitworth laid the ship down at Low Walker in June 1916 for the Russian Empire as yard number 905. She was to be called St. Alexander Nevsky after the Russian statesman and military hero Alexander Nevsky. The Russian naval architect and author Yevgeny Zamyatin supervised her building. She was launched on 23 December 1916 and completed in June 1917.

The ship had three screws, two in the stern and a third one in the bow, each driven by steam engines. Her total power was rated at 1,038 NHP.

== Service history ==
By the time the ship was completed, the Russian Empire had ceased to exist following the February Revolution. In September 1917 the Royal Navy requisitioned and commissioned her as HMS Alexander. She served in the North Russia campaign, and was handed over to White Russian forces when the British withdrew in October 1919.

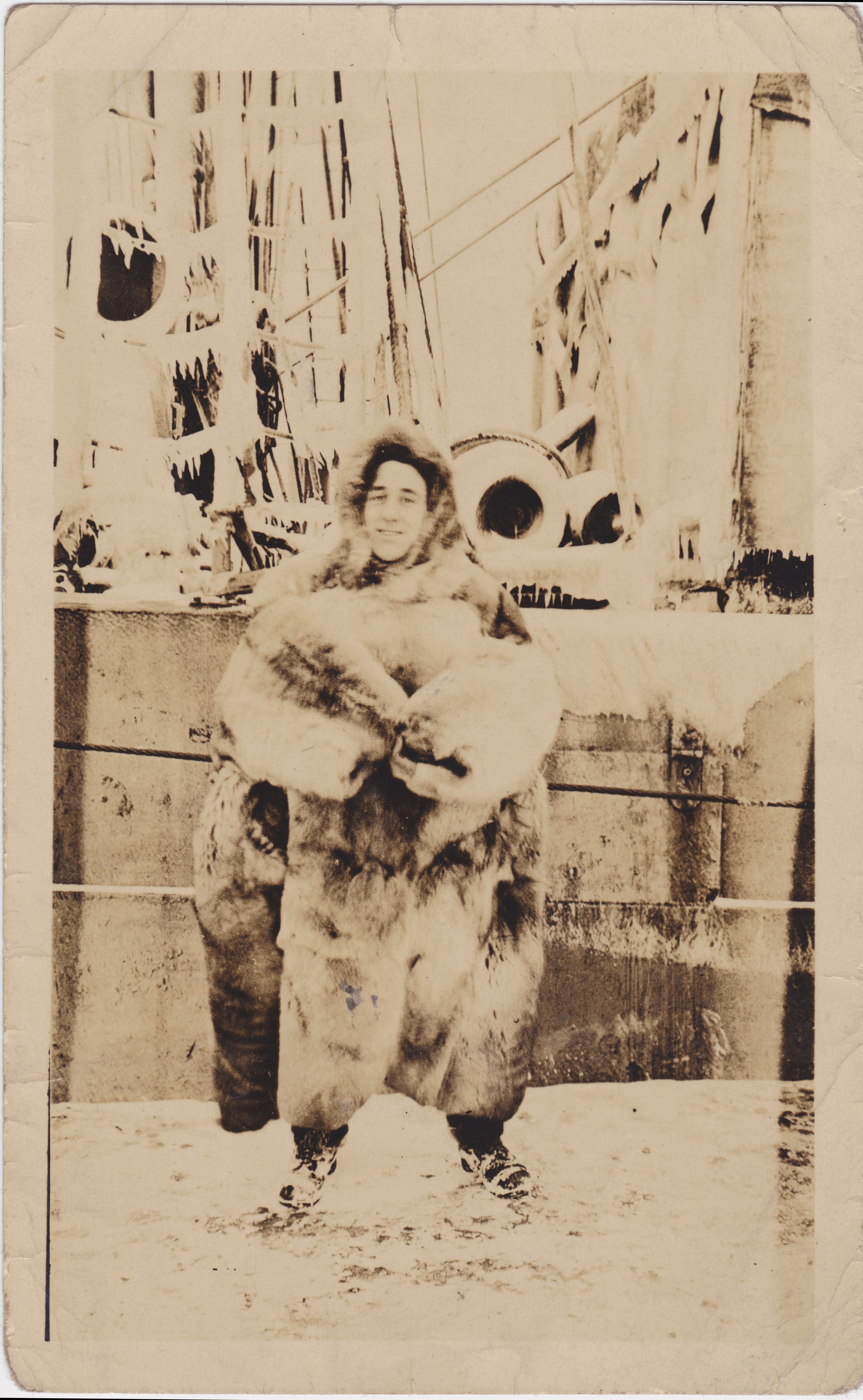
Bill Seagroatt, a British engineer, serving aboard Lenin on the 1922 Kara Sea expedition

The ship must have been soon taken by the Bolsheviks, for in 1921 the Norwegian sailor and Arctic explorer Otto Sverdrup commanded the ship, now named Lenin, at the request of the Soviet government, when he mounted his fourth and last expedition in Arctic Siberian waters. He led a convoy of five cargo ships on an experimental run through the Kara Sea to the mouths of the Ob and Yenisei Rivers. The ships reached their destinations and returned safely. This was considered an important step in the development of the Kara Sea sector of the Northern Sea Route.

In 1937 Lenin was trapped in ice. She and her convoy of five ships were forced to spend the winter in the Laptev Sea. They were finally rescued by the icebreaker Krasin in August 1938.

In World War II Lenin took part in Arctic convoys. In 1942 she was part of a convoy sighted at the Mona Islands in the Kara Sea by a Kriegsmarine Arado Ar 196 during Operation Wunderland. The heavy cruiser Admiral Scheer rushed to find her, but bad weather, fog, and ice saved Lenin.

In October 1943 Lenin was damaged by torpedo in the Kara Sea. In 1946–47 she was repaired in the UK.

Lenin continued in service in the Cold War. In 1957, when the nuclear-powered icebreaker Lenin was launched, the earlier ship was renamed Vladimir Ilich Lenin. The ship was hulked in 1968 and scrapped in 1977.

== In fiction ==
In his dystopian novel We, Zamyatin refers to the specifications of St. Alexander Nevsky in the names of some of his characters.

The ship appears in Dziga Vertov's 1926 film A Sixth Part of the World.

== See also ==
- List of icebreakers
