= Operation Wonderland =

Operation Wonderland may refer to:

- Operation Wunderland, the German World War 2 naval operation in the Arctic
- Operation Wonderland, the military operation in the Iraq War
