= Anatoli Kacharava =

Georgian-Soviet sea captain (1910–1982)

- Born: August 15, 1910; Sukhumi, Georgia Governorate, Russian Empire
- Died: May 8, 1982 (aged 71) Batumi, Georgian SSR
- Allegiance: Soviet Union
- Branch: Soviet Navy
- Service years: 1927–1967
- Rank: Captain 1st rank, prior senior lieutenant
- Conflicts: World War II; Arctic naval operations
- Awards: Order of the Red Banner; Order of the Red Banner of Labour; Order of Lenin
- Spouse: Nato Vachnadze

Anatoli Kacharava (Georgian: ანატოლი კაჭარავა; 15 August 1910 – 8 May 1982) was a Soviet and Georgian sea captain serving in the Soviet Navy. He is known for taking part in the arctic theater of the Second World War where he commanded a Soviet icebreaker A. Sibiryakov until its destruction by a German cruiser Admiral Scheer on August 24, 1942. Kacharava was severely wounded but survived, and was one of 22 of the ship's company that were captured by the Germans.

== Early life and naval career ==
Kacharava was born in the summer of 1910 in a coastal town of Sukhumi, Georgia, then part of the Russian Empire. His parents, Aleksei Kacharava and Natalia Kavtaradze, were traders. He received education in several technical and maritime schools, namely Sukhumi Industrial College, Kherson Maritime School and Fishery College of the Far-East. Afterwards, he joined the navy aboard Soviet icebreaker A. Sibiryakov as a senior lieutenant. He was later promoted to a captain during the Second World War. For his actions during the Battle of Dikson he was awarded the Order of the Red Banner in 1961.

His grave is in Batumi.

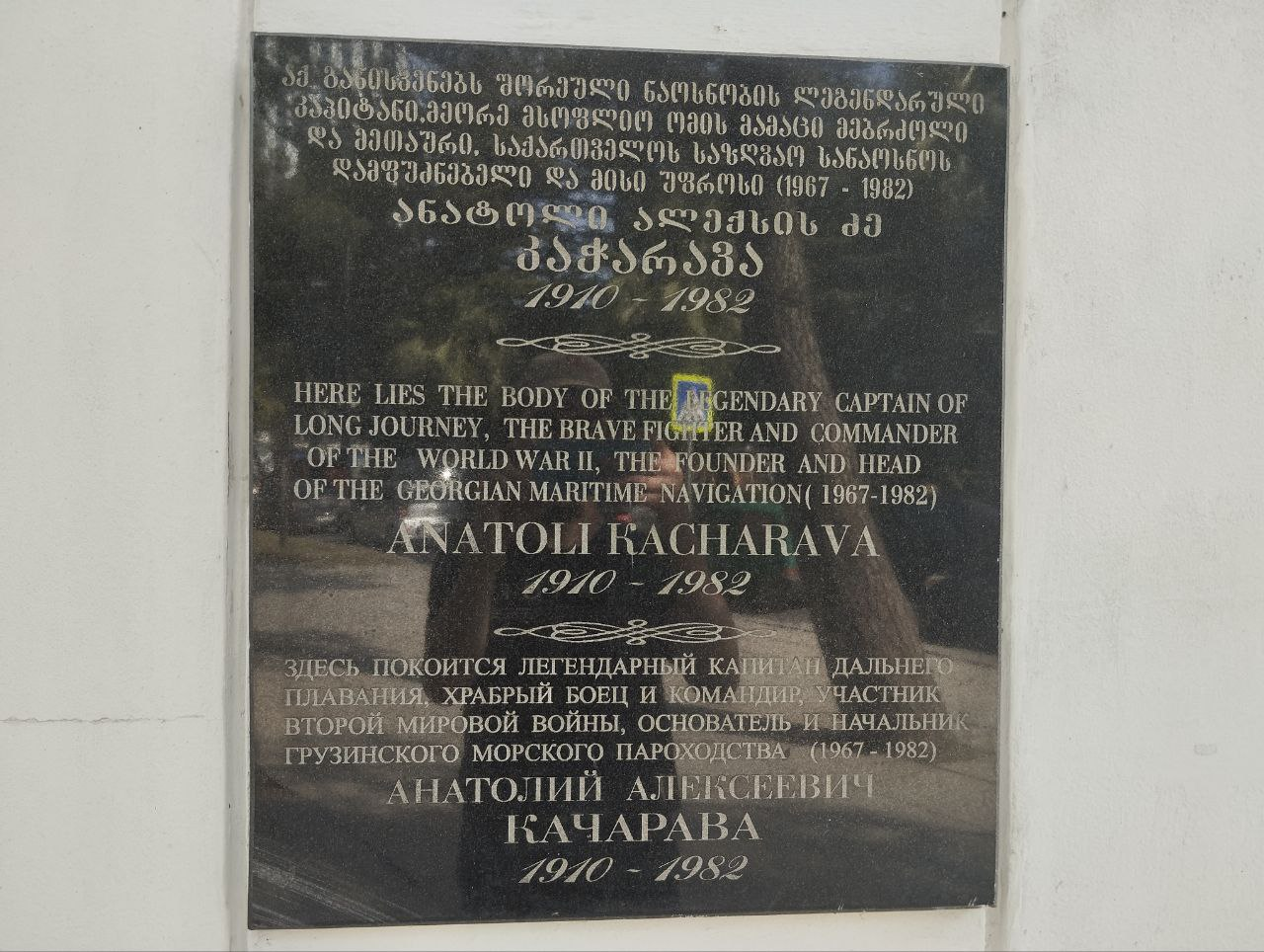
Plaque near grave

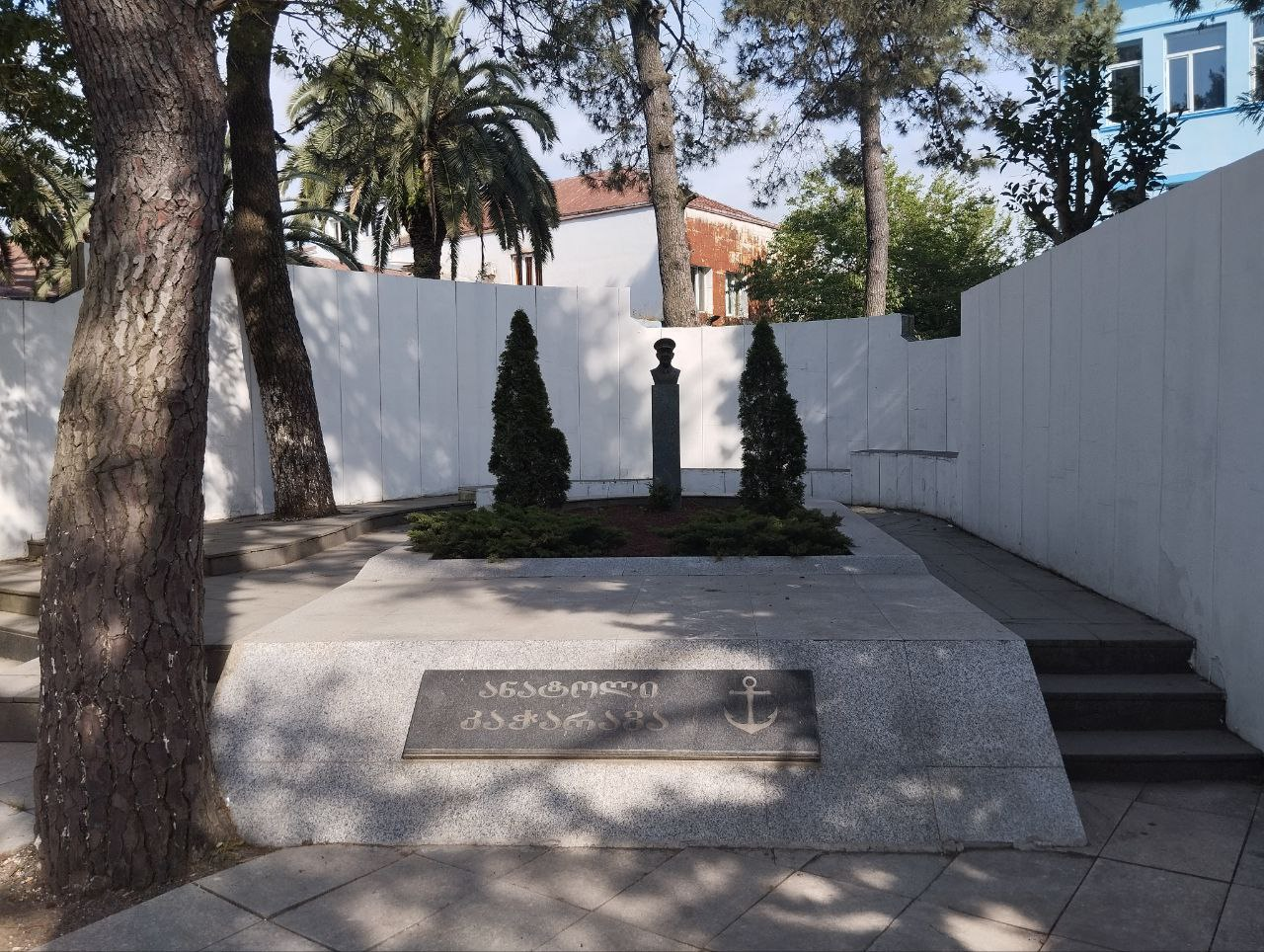
Grave and monument
