= Ledyanyye Islands =

Small island group in the Kara Sea

Coordinates: 76°10′20″N 94°53′30″E

Russian: Острова Ледяные
- Interactive map of Ledyanyye Islands

Geography
- Location: Kara Sea
- Total islands: 2
- Length: 1.8 km (1.12 mi)
- Width: 0.8 km (0.5 mi)
- Highest elevation: 8 m (26 ft)

Administration
- Russia

Demographics
- Population: uninhabited

Ledyanyye Islands (Russian: Острова Ледяные;Ostrova Ledyanyye) are a small island group in the Kara Sea. They are coastal islands near the Nordenskiöld Archipelago, which lies further east.

== Geography ==
The Ledyanyye Islands are a group of two small islands located 5 km (3.1 mi) to the north of the Fuss Peninsula (Poluostrov Fussa) of the Siberian coast, and 13 km (8.1 mi) to the west of Vkhodnoy Island off the westernmost headland of Nansen Island.

The larger island is on the east and is 1.8 km (1.1 mi) long and 0.8 km (0.50 mi) wide. The smaller western island is only 0.5 km (0.31 mi) in length. Both islands are separated by a 0.25 km (0.16 mi) wide sound.

The sea surrounding the Ledyanyye Islands is covered with pack ice with some polynias during the long and harsh winters and there are many ice floes even in the summer.

This island group belongs to the Taymyrsky Dolgano-Nenetsky District of the Krasnoyarsk Krai administrative division of Russia and is part of the Great Arctic State Nature Reserve – the largest nature reserve of Russia and one of the biggest in the world.

== See also ==
- List of islands of Russia
