= Khodovarikha =

Human settlement in Arkhangelsk Oblast, Russia

Khodovarikha Ходовариха
- Headland
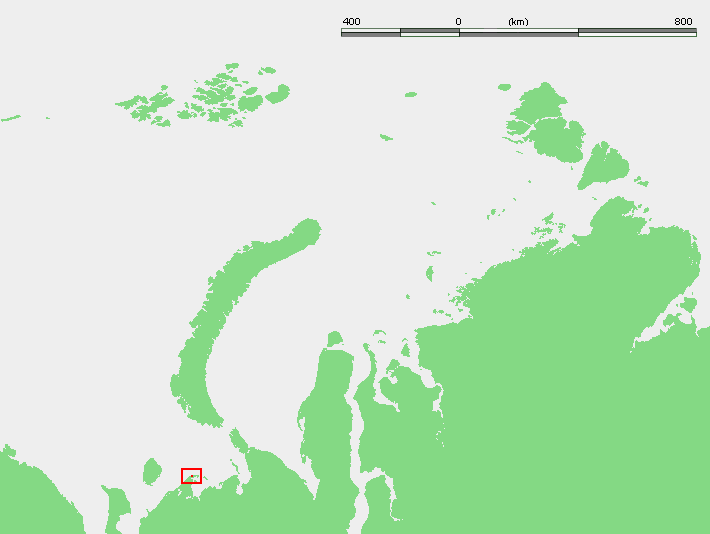
- Location of Khodovarikha in the Barents Sea shore

- Coordinates: 68.941°N 53.769°E
- Location: Nenets Autonomous Okrug, Arkhangelsk Oblast, Russian Federation
- Offshore water bodies: Pechora Sea

Area
  - Total: Arctic

Khodovarikha (Russian: Ходовариха) is a point in the coast of the Pechora Sea located on a landspit projecting eastwards over the bay. Latitude: 68° 57' Longitude: 53° 45'

Khodovarikha belongs to the Nenets Autonomous Okrug administrative region, which is an autonomous okrug of Arkhangelsk Oblast.

== History ==
There is a lighthouse at Khodovarikha that used to be an important beacon for the Russian convoy route coming from the Yugorsky Strait in World War II. It was shelled in 1942 by the Kriegsmarine during Operation Wunderland. The lighthouse ceased operation in 1996.

There was a small populated place close by that has been abandoned. However, there is still a functioning weather station in Khodovarikha that opened on 17 November 1933. There was a wooden lighthouse on Khodovarikha that opened in July 1934 and closed in 1996, however during volunteer works in 2019 it was accidentally burnt down due to an accident by the volunteers.

Khodovarikha was the subject of a 2015 RT documentary Arctic Limbo, chronicling the isolation of the weather station staff in August of that year.
