= Operation Wunderland =

Military operation in World War II

Operation Wonderland/Unternehmen Wunderland
- Part of the Arctic Theatre of the Second World War
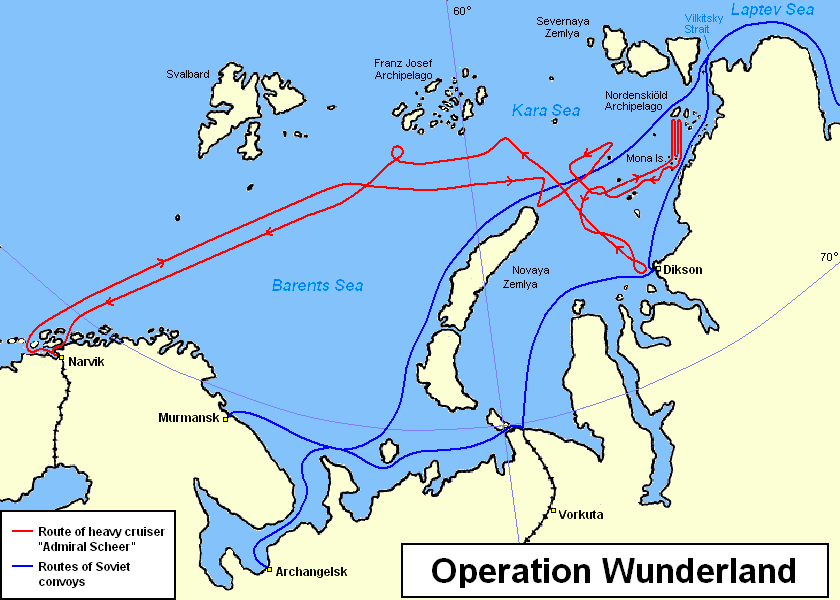
Date	16–30 August 1942
Location	Kara Sea
Result	German victory

Belligerents
Germany	Soviet Union

Commanders and leaders
Hubert Schmundt; Wilhelm Meendsen-Bohlken	Arseniy Golovko; Anatoli Kacharava; V. V. Baluntsev

Strength
Admiral Scheer; Friedrich Eckoldt; Erich Steinbrinck; Richard Beitzen; U-209; U-251; U-456; U-601	Northern Fleet

Casualties and losses
Nil	~ 80 men killed; Sibiryakov sunk; 5 cargo ships sunk; 2 cargo ships damaged; 2 gunboats damaged

Operation Wonderland (Unternehmen Wunderland) was an operation from 16 to 30 August 1942 by the Kriegsmarine in the Barents Sea and the Kara Sea off the Arctic coast of the Soviet Union. The operation was an attack on Soviet shipping using the Northern Sea Route which ran along the Soviet Arctic coast from the Bering Strait, westwards along Siberia to the Kara Sea. The operation was the first part of a campaign to dominate the seas of the western Arctic. Reports from Japanese naval intelligence alerted the Germans to the sailing of a convoy, EON-18.

The German cruiser Admiral Scheer supported by five U-boats and reconnaissance aircraft sailed on 16 August for the Kara Sea where it encountered pack ice. The cruiser carried an Arado Ar 196 reconnaissance floatplane which found several groups of ships. Admiral Scheer sank the icebreaker A. Sibiryakov and bombarded the Soviet base at Dikson before returning to its base at Kirkenes in northern Norway. The meagre result obtained by Admiral Scheer was exceeded by the U-boats in the operation.

== Background ==
=== German plans ===
In 1942, the Seekriegsleitung (SKL) of Oberkommando der Marine, the high command of the German Navy (Kriegsmarine) looked for fairly safe operational possibilities for its heavy units. On 5 May, Admiral Rolf Carls, the commander of Marinegruppe Nord (Naval Group North), ordered Admiral Hubert Schmundt, the commander of the German naval forces in northern Norway, to study the feasibility of sending the heavy cruisers Admiral Scheer, Lützow or Admiral Hipper, based in the north of Norway, on a sortie against convoys using the Northern Sea Route. In July, Naval Group North had suggested a plan to send Admiral Scheer into the Kara Sea, to attack Soviet merchant ships on the Northern Sea Route. Because Adolf Hitler had refused permission for Admiral Scheer to sortie into the Atlantic, Raeder agreed to this "makeshift operation". Wunderland was the first part of a plan to gain control over the western Arctic Sea, to be followed by Operation Zar.

The Germans had polar ice information and aerial photographs of parts of the Kara Sea and its littoral from the airship Graf Zeppelin, which had made a Polar Flight in July 1931. The crew of Graf Zeppelin gleaned information on ice conditions and took photographs of Franz Josef Land (Zemlya Frantsa Iosifa), Northern Land (the Severnaya Zemlya archipelago) and parts of the coasts of the Taymyr Peninsula (Poluostrov Taymyr and Novaya Zemlya (New Land). Accurate maps had been drawn by the use of Photogrammetry on the aerial photographs. Information on ice conditions and navigational problems was also available from the report by Kapitän zur See Robert Eyssen, commander of the auxiliary cruiser and raider Komet, which navigated the northern route, escorted by a Soviet icebreaker, in 1940.

On 5 May 1942, the Marinenachrichtendienst (MND, Naval Intelligence) received information from a prisoner of war that the settlement of Amderma, on the Kara Sea, south of Novaya Zemlya, had been expanded into a big port and that it had a railway link to Vorkuta, thence to the hinterland of the Soviet Union. On 29 June, spies in Canada reported that 18,000 bushels of wheat had been loaded on ships in Vancouver, bound for Siberia. On 1 July, Carls submitted a plan to send Admiral Scheer and Lützow into the Kara Sea against ships using the Northern Sea Route, to bombard Amderma and to attack any fishing craft which were found. SKL accepted the plan but on 8 August, limited it to Admiral Scheer, because of a fuel shortage. The sortie was set for the middle of August, when ice conditions would be at their least obstructive, during a lull in Allied Arctic convoys, after the victory over Convoy PQ 17 (27 June – 10 July 1942).

==== Admiral Scheer ====
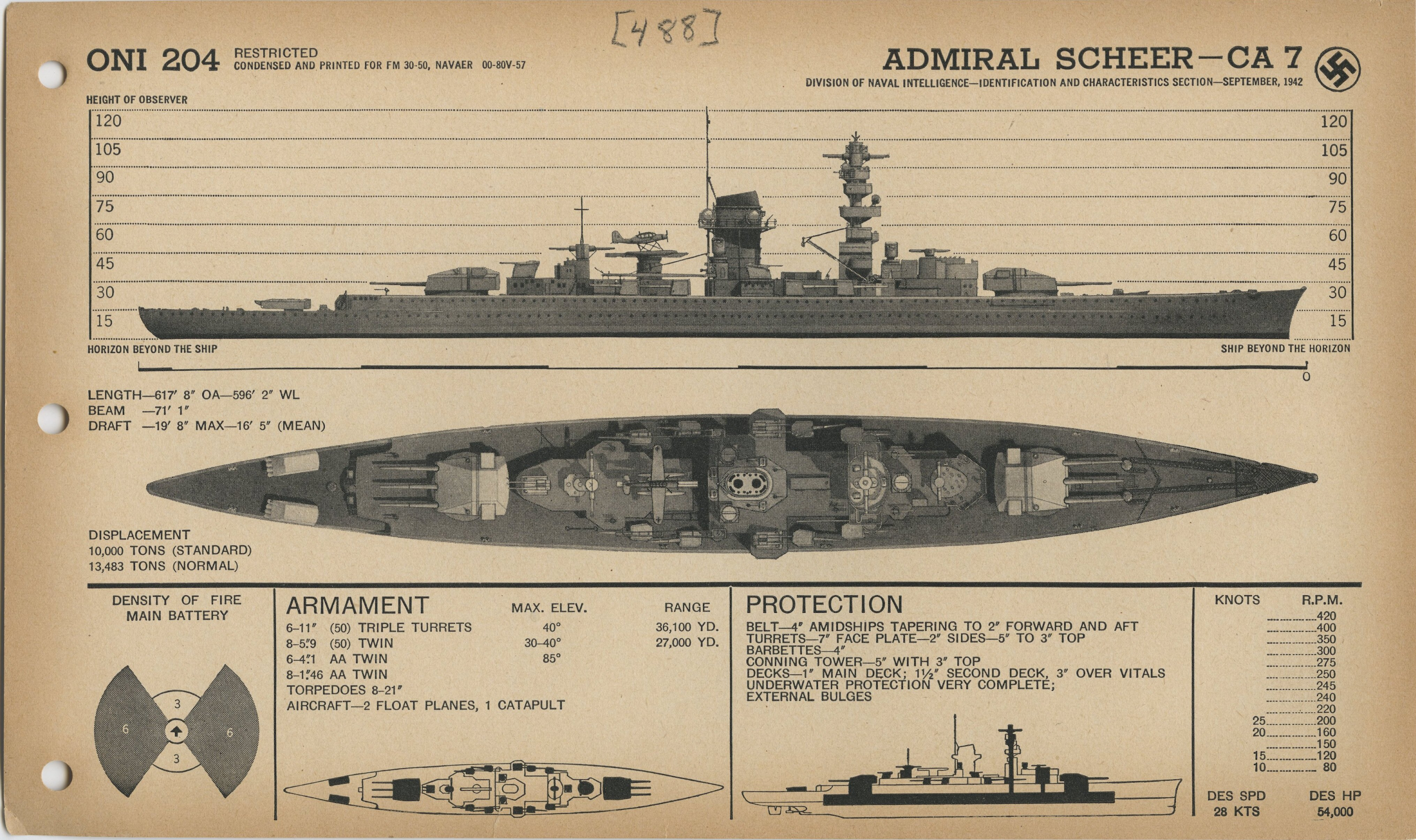
Recognition drawing of Admiral Scheer

Admiral Scheer was a Deutschland-class cruiser of welded construction, with diesel engines capable of 56,000 hp (42,000 kW), a range of 21,500 nmi (39,800 km; 24,700 mi) and a maximum speed of 28 kn (52 km/h; 32 mph). The ship carried six 280 mm (11 in) guns in two triple turrets, eight 150 mm (5.9 in) guns, six 88mm AA in 3 turrets, eight 37 mm (1.5 in) guns, ten 20 mm machine-guns and eight torpedo tubes. The ship had a belt of armour 10 cm (3.9 in)-thick along the water line and 14 cm (5.5 in) of armour on the turrets. Two Arado Ar 196 floatplanes were carried for reconnaissance but one was left behind during the Kara Sea sortie; Admiral Scheer had a crew of 1,150 men.

Kommodore Wilhelm Meendsen-Bohlken, the captain of Admiral Scheer, was given a considerable measure of discretion in the operation. Meendsen-Bohlken was to attack Soviet convoys coming from the east via the northern route in the Kara Sea. A bombardment of Amderma was desirable but left to the captain to decide. Trawlers were to carry out an ice reconnaissance but this was later changed to two U-boats. The destroyer escorts would not accompany Admiral Scheer into the Kara Sea because of their limited endurance and thin hulls. It was vital to surprise the Soviet authorities and Admiral Scheer was to remain beyond sight of land and to keep radio silence. To help find Soviet convoys, staff from the B-Dienst (Beobachtungsdienst Observation Service), the Kriegsmarine wireless interception service, commanded by Fregattenkapitän Diesterweg were embarked on the ship.

==== Intelligence reports ====
Map of the Vilkitsky Strait, between the Taymyr Peninsula and Severnaya Zemlya

During July, Japanese Naval Intelligence reported that on 16 July, twenty merchantmen were said to have arrived at Petropavlovsk and on 26 July the Japanese reported the sailing of a large convoy, including Soviet destroyer escorts, northwards from the port. (In 2020, E. P. Guriev wrote that Convoy EON-18 consisted of six merchant ships with the destroyers Baku, Razumny and Razyashchy with the icebreakers A. Mikoyan and L. Kaganovich.) By 1 August, the convoy was reported to have reached the Bering Strait. SKL estimated that the convoy would enter the Kara Sea via the Vilkitsky Strait, south of the Severnaya Zemlya archipelago, on 15 or 16 August. German spies notified SKL that an eastbound convoy was due to depart from Arkhangelsk on 15 August.

== Prelude ==
=== Kara Sea settlements ===
In 1942, there were 18 settlements on the shores of the Kara Sea, comprising weather stations, ice survey stations and wireless stations. The stations were civilian but were important for the Northern Sea Route yet had few defences. Merchant ships and icebreakers carried guns and anti-aircraft armament but the polar stations were undefended. Precautions at the polar stations were limited to emergency radio stations hidden away from the base where they were not visible from the sea, equipped with supplies, fuel, sleeping bags, tents and other essentials in case of attack. Amderma was not part of the Northern Sea Route but a defunct mine with a small settlement and no railway or port.

The Kara Sea terminus of the Northern Sea Route had a local centre on Dikson Island. There was a wireless station, a geophysical observatory, an airstrip and the regional headquarters of Glavsevmorput the Chief Administration of the Northern Sea Route. Dikson harbour was on the mainland opposite and there was a large coal depot in the middle of the anchorage on Konus Island. Because of its role as the western terminal of the Northern Sea Route, modest defensive works had been installed before the war. Two artillery batteries, one of 152 mm and one of 130 mm guns and an anti-aircraft battery had been placed there to cover the harbour and the outer approaches.

=== Preliminary operations ===
On 26 July the submarine U-601 (Korvettenkapitän Peter-Ottmar Grau) bombarded a Russian polar station at Karmakuly on Novaya Zemlya and sank the Soviet merchant ship Krestyanin (2,513 GRT) near the Matochkin Strait off Yuzhny Island, the southern island of Novaya Zemlya on 1 August. For concealment, Admiral Scheer would have to enter the Kara Sea by a northabout route past Cape Zhelaniya and on 11 August, U-601 departed from Kirkenes for the waters north of Novaya Zemlya, to check the ice limit. U-251 (Korvettenkapitän Heinrich Timm), was to enter the Kara Sea from the south, via the Yugorsky Strait, which separates Vaygach Island from the Yugorsky Peninsula on the mainland. On 14 August, Carls ordered the operation to begin; a low-pressure area was on its way and it was intended that Admiral Scheer should exploit the poor visibility common in low-pressure areas to cross the Barents Sea without detection. The lull in Allied convoys released more submarines for Wunderland. U-209 (Kapitänleutnant Heinrich Brodda) was dispatched to watch the western entrance of the Kara Strait and U-456 (Kapitänleutnant Max-Martin Teichert) to the west end of the Matochkin Strait. From 11 to 17 August, U-255 (Kapitänleutnant Reinhart Reche) and a BV 138 flying-boat, fitted with extra fuel tanks, reconnoitred the Svalbard Archipelago and U-435 (Kapitänleutnant Siegfried Strelow) delivered the weather station party Knospe (Bud) to the islands, to provide weather information for ships operating against the Northern Sea Route. On 15 August, U-601 reported that the ice limit was 100 nmi (190 km; 120 mi) north of Cape Zhelaniya.

== Unternehmen Wunderland ==
=== 16–19 August ===
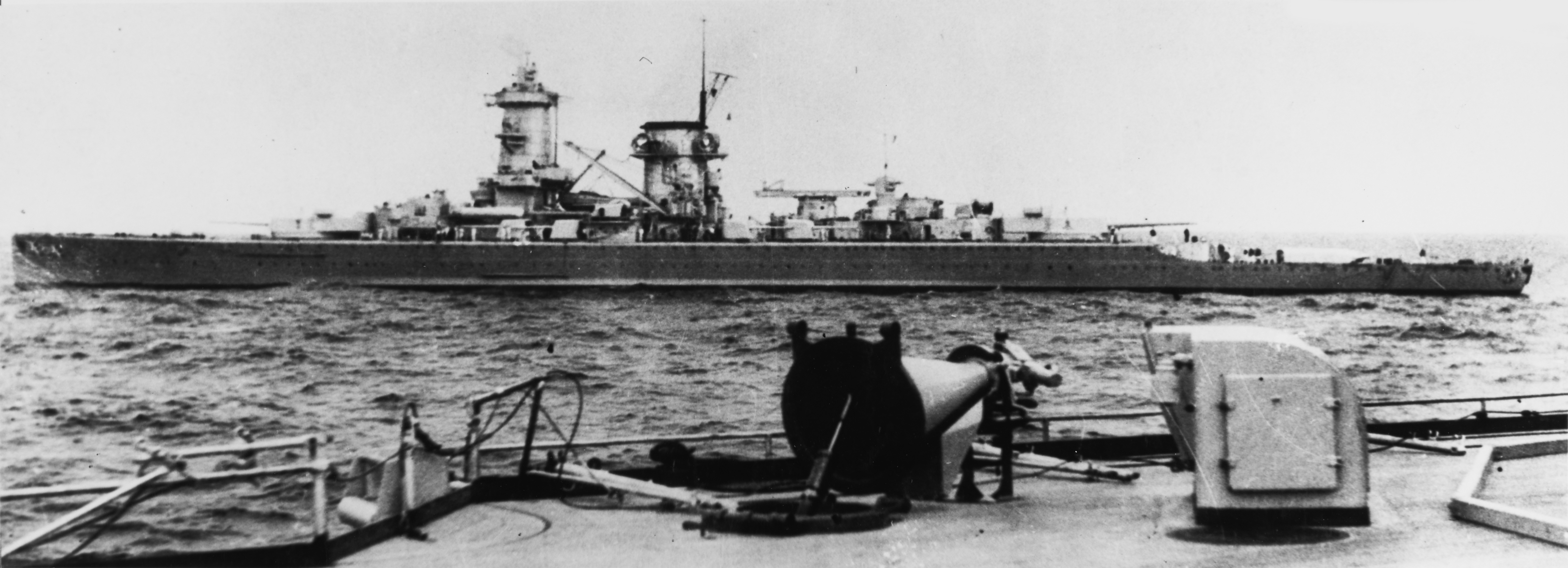
Admiral Scheer at sea (photographed c. 1935)

Admiral Scheer left Narvik on 16 August 1942, escorted by the destroyers Richard Beitzen, Erich Steinbrinck and Friedrich Eckoldt. The ships sailed southwards to mislead the British and then the destroyers made for Tromsø. The weather conditions were excellent for concealment, with storms and poor visibility but Admiral Scheer was nearly spotted by a Soviet merchant ship on 18 August. A rendezvous with U-601 had been planned for just after midnight on 18/19 August at 78°N 72°E. Grau said that the route eastwards into the Kara Sea was ice free and that no aircraft or ships had been seen. Grau sailed south to patrol off the mouths of the river Ob and the Yenisey, the largest river to empty into the Arctic Ocean. Admiral Scheer passed Cape Zhelaniya at the north end of Novaya Zemlya, the boundary of the Barents Sea and the Kara Sea.

Admiral Scheer sailed eastwards for the Vilkitsky Strait through pack ice and two sorties were flown by the Arado to find the clearest route. The ice increased and at 9:00 p.m. about 20 nmi (37 km; 23 mi) north of Uyedineniya Island, Meendsen-Bohlken turned the ship around, apprehensive of damage to the propellers. After heading west to get clear of the ice, the cruiser turned to the south-east along the edge of the pack ice. On the morning of 20 August, Admiral Scheer rendezvoused with U-251; Korvettenkapitän Timm went on board the cruiser to report and said that no ships had been seen but noted that funnel smoke from Admiral Scheer was visible for 32 km (20 mi) in the clear, calm, Arctic air. U-251 turned south and Admiral Scheer continued towards the south-east for the Laptev Sea, to ambush coastal traffic. In these unfamiliar coastal waters, Meendsen-Bohlken found his charts to be unreliable; skerries (rocky islets) were found in what were supposed to be open waters and shoals (underwater ridges and banks) appeared where deep water was marked.

=== 20–24 August ===
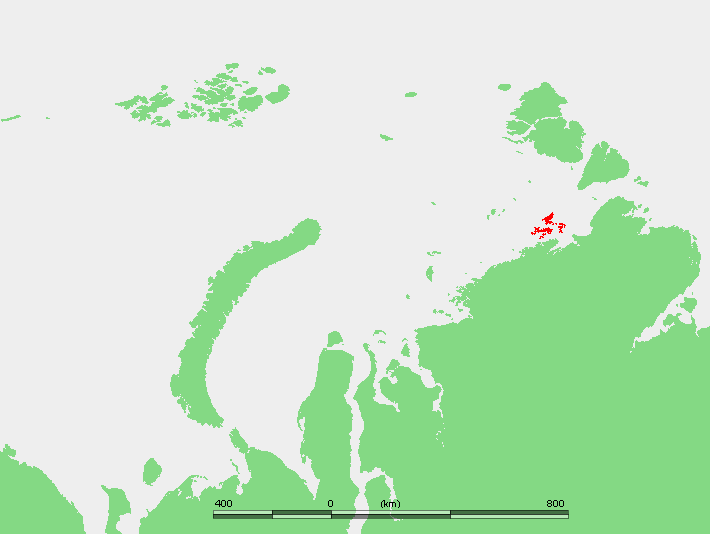
The Nordenskiöld Archipelago (in red) Severnaya Zemlya above (in green)

On 20 August the Arado crew spotted three groups of Soviet ships, including the icebreakers Lenin and Krasin near Kravkov Island in the Mona Islands, roughly 16 nmi (30 km; 18 mi) north of the west coast of the Taymyr Peninsula. On 23 August more ships were seen in the Vilkitsky Strait, between the Taimyr Peninsula and Bolshevik Island in the Severnaya Zemlya archipelago. From 20 to 25 August, the Kara Sea was searched north and east towards the Vilkitsky Strait and as far west as Uyedineniya Island, to find the convoys discovered by the Arado or uncovered by the B-Dienst party.

The search was thwarted by thick fog and Admiral Scheer lost track of the convoys, then had to sink the Arado after a landing accident. While searching to the north of Russky Island in the Nordenskiöld Archipelago, Admiral Scheer was enveloped by fog so thick that Meendsen-Bohlken was forced to anchor amidst drifting ice, which began to pack, potentially trapping the ship. Visibility improved and Meendsen-Bohlken managed to navigate out of the ice. Fog and ice floes prevented the ship from approaching and on arrival at the Mona Islands, the Russian ships had gone.

=== 25 August ===
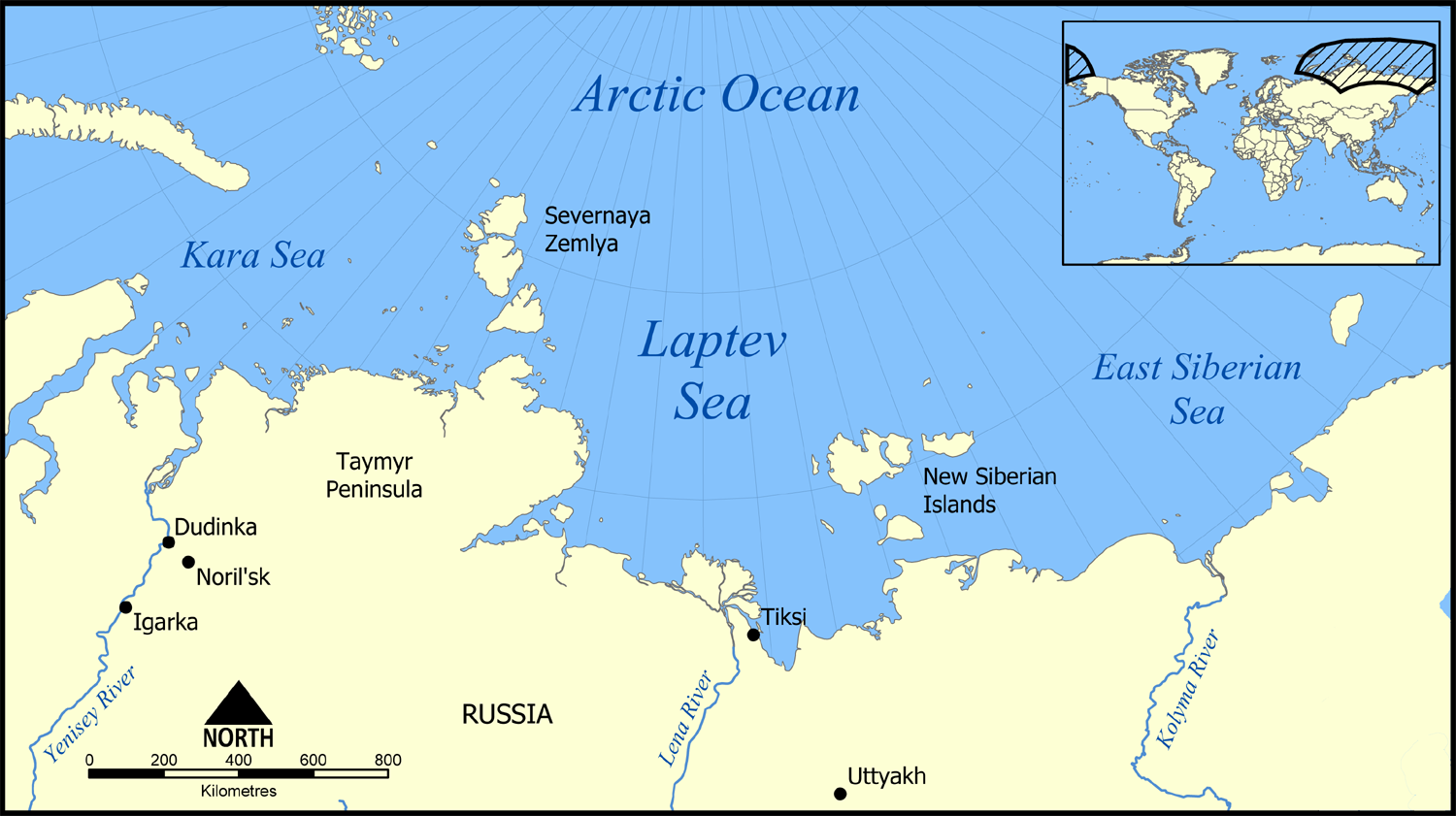
Map of the Laptev Sea

On 25 July, two masts were spotted at 19 nmi (35 km; 22 mi) and Meendsen-Bohlken approached the ship to seize its codes and cyphers to eavesdrop on Russian wireless messages on ice conditions around the Vilkitsky Strait. The ship was the icebreaker Sibiryakov 1,384 GRT (Kapitan Anatoli Kacharava), armed with two 76 mm and two 45 mm guns. When spotted, Sibiryakov was bound for the Arctic Cape, at the north end of Severnaya Zemlya, to visit the weather station. More personnel had been embarked for the station, bringing the ship's complement to 104 men. (Note: Sibiryakov had been built in 1909 on the Clyde, operated as the sealer Bellaventure off Newfoundland and in 1932 made the first one-season passage of the Northern Sea Route, losing its propeller towards the end of the voyage, reaching the Bering Strait with improvised sails.)

The Russians mistook Admiral Scheer, which was approaching head-on, for the cruiser USS Tuscaloosa. Kacharava then became suspicious, ordered action stations and turned towards Beluga Island south of Cape Dikson and north-east of the Vkhodnoy Strait near Vkhodnoy Island. The Russians tried to get off a distress signal "Have sighted an unknown auxiliary cruiser which is closing with us; please watch this channel" to Dikson but the B-Dienst operators on Admiral Scheer managed to jam the signal. The Russian captain was ordered to "Lower your flag and surrender", followed by a warning shot. The gunners on Sibiryakov replied quickly but were hopelessly outgunned; Admiral Scheer fired six salvoes and obtained four hits, setting Sibiryakov on fire.

The Germans launched a boat with a boarding party to recover codebooks and other papers as Sibiryakov began to sink but Kacharava had ordered Engineer Bochurko to open the seacocks; Bochurko carried out the order and went down with the ship. Lifeboats had been lowered and most of the survivors including Kacharava, who had been wounded, made for Beluga Island but were intercepted by the launch. (There are conflicting reports over the number of prisoners taken, which vary from 19 to 28.) Some of the Russians refused to be rescued, preferring to drown or die of exposure; one man managed reach the island, where he was rescued a month later.

=== 26 August, attack on Dikson ===
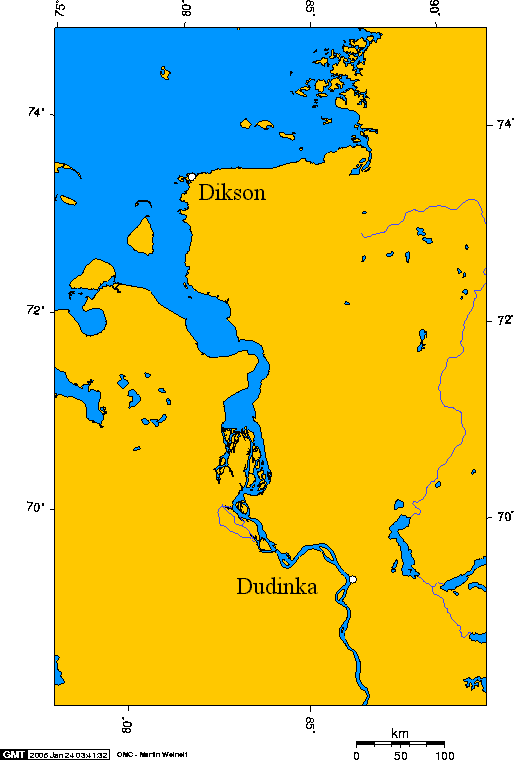
Map showing Dikson on the Taymyr peninsula

B-Dienst heard a warning broadcast to all Soviet shipping in the Kara Sea that an unknown German ship was at large, which meant that the period of the element of surprise had ended. Fearing attack by aircraft, Meendsen-Bohlken sailed away from the Taymyr Peninsula. North-westerly winds continued to pack the ice into the mouth of the Vilkitsky Strait and after the loss of the Arado, an attack on the convoy near there had to be abandoned. The volume of wireless transmissions from Dikson to ships and ports intercepted by the B-Dienst party had shown that it was an important base for the western end of Northern Sea Route. To interfere with these convoys and to capture ice data, which could help gain the objectives of Wunderland, Meendsen-Bohlken decided to attack the port and headed south on 26 August. Meendsen-Bohlken had information that Dikson was protected by sixty Frontier Guards equipped with small-arms.

The Germans did not know that when the war began, Ivan Papanin, the head of the Chief Directorate of the Northern Sea Route (Glavsevmorput) had asked for the defences of Dikson to be reinforced. The 226th naval battery with two 130 mm (5.1 in) guns and the 246th anti-aircraft battery with two 45 mm (1.8 in) guns were dispatched to Dikson, followed later by the 569th heavy battery with two 1910-vintage 152 mm (6.0 in) siege guns. Ships at Dikson were ordered south to the Golchikha river to wait on events. On 26 August the officers at Dikson met on board SKR-19/Semyon Dezhnev (Senior Lieutenant A. S. Gidulyanov) and decided to form two militia units commanded by Sidorin and Statov, the heads of the polar station. The border guards had two 37 mm anti-tank guns, a 76 mm anti-aircraft gun and a 75 mm howitzer. The 300 militia, carrying rifles, hunting pieces and carbines, patrolled the port. Women and children were evacuated to a settlement on the river Lembrovka, along with confidential documents.

The guns were being removed and loaded onto for transfer to Beluga Bay on the south island of Novaya Zemlya, which was under frequent German air attack. The commander of the 569th heavy battery, Lieutenant Kornyakov ordered the unloading of 152 mm ammunition and picked volunteers for the guns from the dock workers. Commissar Babintsev of the White Sea Naval Group and Gidulyanov set off on a reconnaissance to Cape Kretchatik, with Molokov, a tug pulling a barge with the 226th naval battery and its ammunition, to decide where to site it. Dezhnev was armed with four 76 mm guns, four 45 mm guns and four 20 mm Oerlikon guns. Revolyutsioner (Captain Panfilov of Glavsevmorput) armed with a 76 mm gun, a 45 mm gun and two Oerlikons, carrying a cargo of wood arrived. The third ship in port was Kara, unarmed and carrying hundreds of tons of explosives used for mining and clearing paths through ice fields. At 1:05 a.m. on 27 August, lookouts near the former 226th battery emplacement in the north-west of the port spotted Admiral Scheer to the south along the west shore of Dikson Island. The alarm was raised and the wireless station began broadcasting warnings in clear. Two lookouts, with a rifle and five rounds followed the ship, ready to engage a landing party.

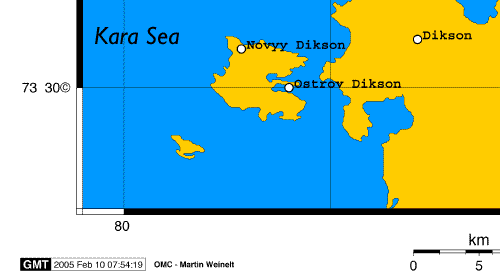
Location of Dikson Island and Dikson at the mouth of the Yenisei river

Dezhnev was near the Konus Island coal terminal in the inner harbour and Gidulyanov ordered the ship away from the terminal closer to the shore. About thirty minutes later Admiral Scheer passed a navigation station at Skuratov near the south harbour, 4.5 mi (7.2 km) from the port. Meendsen-Bohlken had prepared a landing-party of 180 men, to be covered by the main and secondary armament, for a landing as close as possible to the Glavsevmorput offices, minimising the time when the party could be engaged before it landed. Little opposition was expected, perhaps some light artillery fire from merchant ships and the shore garrison.

Dezhnev had got under way and Gidulyanov ordered full ahead, intending to attack the port side of Admiral Scheer so that if damaged he could sink Dezhnev in the gap between Pirozhok Island and shallow water, obstructing access to the inner harbour. As the German ship came closer, Gidulyanov played for time by signalling an identification demand but as soon as Admiral Scheer came in sight of the Russian ships it opened fire, as did Dezhnev, aiming at the bridge, fo'c's'le and the rangefinders and seeing explosions. (Note: German sources do not mention damage to the superstructure.)

Dezhnev was hit several times but the armour-piercing shells went through the hull. Admiral Scheer switched to high explosive ammunition, which soon caused severe damage, including holes below the waterline. Six members of the crew were killed, one mortally wounded and twenty wounded. Dezhnev began to make smoke, sought shelter by heading for Samoletnaya Bay but at 1:36 a.m. Gidulyanov tried to prevent the ship from capsizing, damage control reporting that it would need three hours to make repairs and bail out the ship. Admiral Scheer changed aim and quickly hit Revolyutsioner three times, despite the smoke-screen, setting it on fire, cutting the steam pipe and jamming the winch for raising the anchor, keeping the ship stationary. Kara was fairly well protected by the shore and the smoke but then the 152 mm guns began to fire, sending up columns of water next to Admiral Scheer. The guns had been emplaced near the pier against a background of the land, in a haze and the smokescreen. The heavy shells were a surprise for the Germans but the guns, 8 t (7.9 long tons; 8.8 short tons) in weight, rolled back after each shot and a lorry had to be used to return the guns to their firing positions.

The gunners and volunteers got some logs to block the spade trails of the guns, which allowed them to increase the rate of fire. At 1:46 a.m., by when the 569th battery had fired forty rounds, Admiral Scheer made smoke, sailed round Cape Anvil and moved northwards along Dikson Island, bombarding the weather station on Great Bear Island for five minutes. The 569th battery fired blind at the sound of the guns but had no success. Meendsen-Bohlken received reports that the oil depot and coal on Konus Island were on fire, wireless masts had been knocked down, the wireless station, its power plant and other buildings were burning. Having fired 20 per cent of the ship's ammunition, with the bombardment from the heavy Russian guns continuing and needing to conserve ammunition, Meendsen-Bohlken decided to lay more smoke, turned starboard and headed back into the Kara Sea. B-Dienst intercepted a Soviet signal that Kuibyshev had been sunk and mistakenly thought that it had been in the harbour; the ship had been sunk on 24 August by U-601 at a position to the north-west of Dikson. The damage caused by the bombardment was far less extensive than the Germans assumed. Revolyutsioner was operational in three days and Dezhnev three days later. the icebreakers Litke and Taimyr sailed to Port Dudinka and three days later brought back fuel enough for the next convoy.

=== 27–30 August ===
Although Admiral Scheer had been only superficially damaged, if at all, the Russians had only to suspend convoys for a short time and the icing of the Kara Sea would force the raider to withdraw or risk being trapped. Early on 28 August, Carls signalled orders for Meendsen-Bohlken to start for home at noon on 29 September. Meendsen-Bohlken broke wireless silence to request permission for a delay, to make a sweep south of the Franz Joseph Archipelago to Svalbard but this was refused and Admiral Scheer began its return voyage. On 29 August, the destroyers Friedrich Eckoldt, Erich Steinbrinck and Richard Beitzen sailed to meet Admiral Scheer near Bear Island and escorted the cruiser back to Kirkenes by 30 August. Not long after the return of Admiral Scheer, it was seen by British reconnaissance aircraft and the Soviet authorities were informed that shipping in the Kara and Barents seas were no longer endangered by surface ships.

=== U-boat operations ===
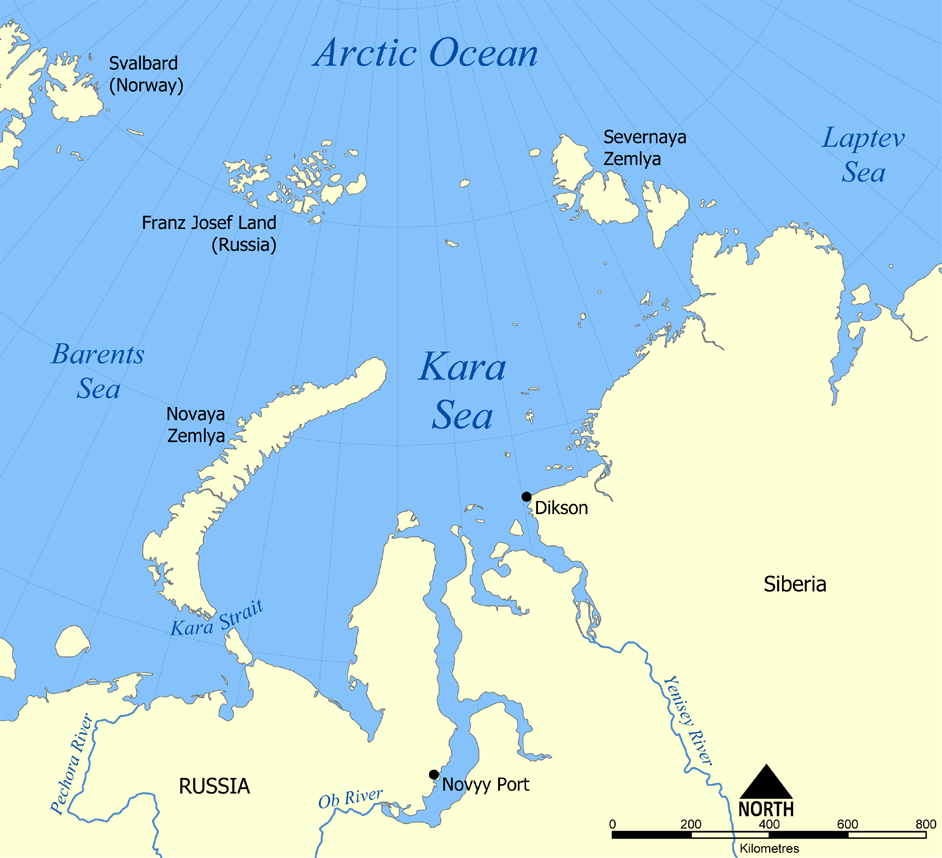
Map of the Kara Sea; Pechora Sea south-west of Novaya Zemlya

On 17 August, west of the Yugorsky Strait, the narrow sound between the Pechora Sea and the Kara Sea, at the south-eastern end of the Barents Sea, U-209 spotted a Soviet Secret Service (NKVD) convoy, comprising the tugs Komsomolets and Nord towing the lighter Sh-500, P-4 and Komiles, a tug with an unserviceable engine. The convoy was bound for Naryan-Mar up the Pechora River. The lighter carried building materials and P-4 held 300 Gulag prisoners. At about 7:00 a.m., U-209 surfaced and engaged the convoy with its deck gun. P-4 was attacked first and the prisoners, in black uniforms, were taken for Red Army troops. The barge caught fire and the guards jumped overboard; Komsomolets had cast off its tow and U-209 changed target, sinking it. P-4 was torpedoed and Nord escaped, later to return with a couple of Soviet minesweepers but found only 23 of the 328 men, none of them prisoners.

On 20 August, U-456 attacked the Soviet icebreaker SKR-18/Fyodor Litke off Whale Bay, a settlement on the Gusinaya Zemlya peninsula of Yuzhny Island (Novaya Zemlya) but its torpedoes missed. The U-boat was depth-charged by four escort vessels and escaped by diving under the ice. On 24 August, U-601 sank the merchant ship Kuybyshev (2,332 GRT) and the tug Medvezhonok (bear cub) near Cape Zhelaniya (Cape Desire). U-255 destroyed the Soviet wireless station at Cape Zhelaniya with gunfire on 25 August. On 28 August U-209 bombarded the wireless station and lighthouse at Khodovarikha on Zavorot Island. U-589 laid mines the west end of the Matochkin Strait and on 7 September, a U-boat bombarded the wireless station on Uyedineniya Island. Post war investigation found evidence that there had been a German observation post on Vardroper Island the outermost of the Minina Skerries during Wunderland. The survey ship lsledovatel, on a voyage to the navigation beacon on the island, found an abandoned camp with German labels on discarded tins and a wireless aerial on the beacon. (Note: In 1975, William Barr wrote that most of the ships on the Northern Sea Route passed the island, making the site well-chosen.)

== Aftermath ==
=== Analysis ===
Operation Wonderland (Unternehmen Wunderland) was a modest success. Owing to adverse weather and an abundance of ice floes, Admiral Scheer did not venture beyond the Vilkitsky Strait. Wunderland only affected shipping in the Barents Sea and the Kara Sea. By the end of August the voyage of Admiral Scheer was over and by mid-September, U-boat operations ended because of the freezing of the sea surface with thick pack ice, especially in the Kara Sea, which not being affected by the warmer Atlantic currents, freezes much earlier. The Soviet navy had failed to intercept Admiral Scheer because Glavsevmorput, which administered shipping in the Kara Sea, did not inform the Northern Fleet HQ of its presence for 36 hours.

=== Subsequent operations ===
Operation Wonderland II was planned for 1 August 1943 with the heavy cruiser Lützow but the raid was cancelled. Despite the end of Wonderland II on 4 October 1943, operations in Kara Sea resumed the following year until 4 October 1944.

== German order of battle ==
Name	Flag	Type	Notes
U-boat preliminaries (11–17 August)
U-601	Kriegsmarine	Type VIIC submarine	Barents Sea ice reconnaissance, Kara Sea operations
U-251	Kriegsmarine	Type VIIC submarine	Barents Sea ice reconnaissance
U-209	Kriegsmarine	Type VIIC submarine	Operations west of Novaya Zemlya
U-456	Kriegsmarine	Type VIIC submarine	Operations west of Novaya Zemlya, bombarded Khodovarikha 28 August
U-255	Kriegsmarine	Type VIIC submarine	Reconnoitred Svalbard, bombarded Cape Zhelaniya 25 August
U-435	Kriegsmarine	Type VIIC submarine	Transported Knospe weather party to Svalbard
Admiral Scheer and escorts
Admiral Scheer	Kriegsmarine	Deutschland-class cruiser	16–30 August 1942
Richard Beitzen	Kriegsmarine	Type 1934-class destroyer	Outbound escort 16–19 August; inbound escort 29−30 August
Erich Steinbrinck	Kriegsmarine	Type 1934A-class destroyer	Outbound escort 16–19 August; inbound escort 29−30 August
Friedrich Eckoldt	Kriegsmarine	Type 1934A-class destroyer	Outbound escort 16–19 August; inbound escort 29−30 August
Luftwaffe
BV 138	Luftwaffe	Flying boat	Maritime reconnaissance
Arado Ar 196	Luftwaffe	Floatplane	Reconnaissance, on Admiral Scheer

== Soviet losses ==
Soviet ships attacked by Admiral Scheer or U-boats (Note: Storozhevoi Korabl' (SKL) is the Russian for Guard Ship)
Name	Year	Flag	GRT /Disp	Notes
A. Sibiryakov	1909	Soviet Union	1,132	Ice breaker, sunk by Admiral Scheer, 25 August
SKR-19/Semen Dezhnev		Soviet Union		Damaged by Admiral Scheer
SS Revolyutsioner	1936	Soviet Union	2,920	Damaged by Admiral Scheer
Nord		Soviet Union	411	Tug, towing lighter B-III, sunk 17 August U-209
Komsomolets		Soviet Union	220	Tug, towing lighter B-IV, sunk 17 August U-209
SKR-18/Fedor Litke	1909	Soviet Union	4,850	Ice breaker, attacked 20 August, by U-456
SS Kuibishev	1929	Soviet Union	2,332	Freighter, sunk 24 August, U-601
Medvezhonok		Soviet Union	50	Tug, sunk 24 August, U-601
