= A. Sibiryakov (icebreaker) =

Steamship (1909–1942)

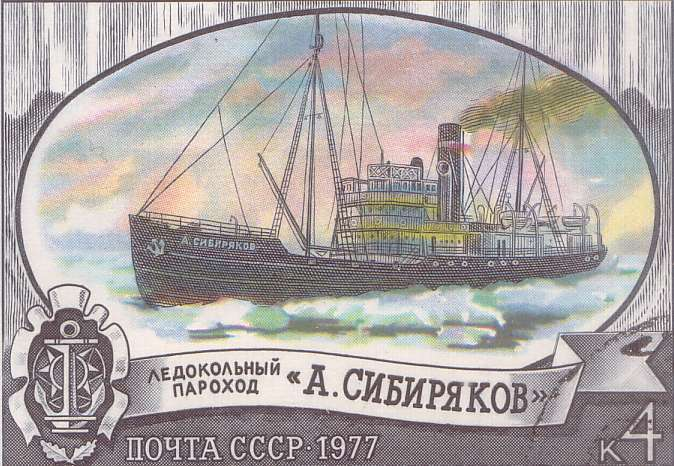
- A. Sibiryakov on a Soviet postage stamp

History
- Name: 1909: Bellaventure; 1927: Alexander Sibiriakov; 1939: Alexander Sibiryakov
- Namesake: Alexander Sibiryakov
- Owner: 1909: Bellaventure SS Co Ltd; 1917: Russian Government; 1920: Byelomortran; 1922: Glavsevmorput; 1924: A/O Sovtorgflot; 1933: Glavsevmorput
- Operator: 1909: A Harvey & Co; 1919: Ellerman's Wilson Line; 1941: (Soviet Union) Soviet Navy
- Port of registry: 1909: (Dominion of Newfoundland) St John's; 1917: (Soviet Union) Arkhangelsk
- Builder: D&W Henderson, Glasgow
- Yard number: 464
- Launched: 23 November 1908
- Completed: January 1909
- Acquired: 1916
- Identification: 1909: UK official number 127684; 1909: code letters TQNL; 1914: w/t call sign VOM; 1933: code letters HPFG; 1934: call sign RAHE; 1939: call sign UNHE; 1941: pennant number LD-6
- Fate: Sunk by enemy action, 24 August 1942

General characteristics
- Type: 1909: seal hunting support ship; 1917: icebreaker
- Tonnage: 1910: 1,132 GRT, 467 NRT; 1935: 1,384 GRT, 471 NRT
- Length: 241.0 ft (73.5 m)
- Beam: 35.8 ft (10.9 m)
- Draught: 20 ft (6 m)
- Depth: 16.9 ft (5.2 m)
- Ice class: icebreaker
- Installed power: 2,360 hp (1,760 kW), 347 NHP
- Propulsion: 1 × triple expansion engine; 1 × screw
- Speed: 13 knots (24 km/h)
- Crew: 104
- Armament: 1941: 76 mm (3 in) & 45 mm (2 in) guns; by 1942: as above plus 1 × 4 in (102 mm) gun

Alexander Sibiryakov (Russian Александр Сибиряков) was a steamship that was built in Scotland in 1909 as Bellaventure, and was originally a seal hunting ship in Newfoundland. In 1917 the Russian government bought her to be an icebreaker. She served the RSFSR and Soviet Union until 1942, when she was sunk by enemy action. The ship gave notable service in the Russian Arctic during the 1930s.

The ship was recorded as Bellaventure until at least 1920. By 1927 she had been renamed Александр Сибиряков. In the Latin alphabet her name was rendered Alexander Sibiriakov until at least 1935. This had been changed to Alexander Sibiryakov by 1939.

== Building ==
In 1908 A Harvey & Co of St John's, Newfoundland ordered a pair of ships from shipbuilders in Glasgow, Scotland. D&W Henderson Ltd built Bellaventure, launching her on 23 November 1908. Napier and Miller built her sister ship Bonaventure, launching her on 5 December 1908. Both ships were completed in January 1909.

Bellaventure's registered length was 241.0 ft (73.5 m), her beam was 35.8 ft (10.9 m), her depth was 16.9 ft (5.2 m) and her tonnages were 1,132 GRT and 467 NRT. She had a single screw, driven by a three-cylinder triple expansion engine that was rated at 347 NHP.

Bellaventure's United Kingdom official number was 127684 and her code letters were TQNL. By 1914 she was equipped for wireless telegraphy. Her call sign was VOM.

== 1914 Newfoundland Sealing Disaster ==
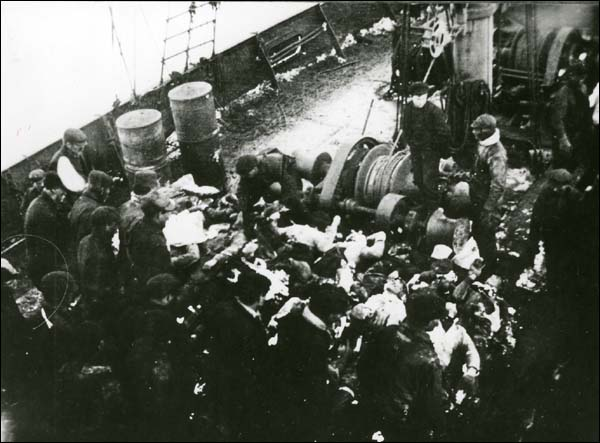
Survivors and dead bodies aboard Bellaventure from the 1914 sealing disaster

On 2 April 1914 Bellaventure, commanded by Captain Isaac Randell, was off the northern coast of Newfoundland taking part in a seal hunt. 132 hunters from another steamship, Newfoundland, had become lost in a storm on an ice floe. After 54 hours Bellaventure rescued the survivors and recovered 77 dead bodies. She sailed through the Narrows of St. John's, Newfoundland, with her flags at half mast.

== Bought by Russia ==
In 1917 the Russian government bought both Bellaventure and Bonaventure. In 1919, in the North Russia intervention in the Russian Civil War, United Kingdom forces in Arkhangelsk took control of both ships, and Ellerman's Wilson Line was appointed to manage Bellaventure.

Eventually the two ships were renamed Alexander Sibiryakov and Vladimir Rusanov, after two Russian arctic explorers.

== Between the wars ==
Alexander Sibiryakov made the first successful crossing of the Northern Sea Route in a single navigation without wintering. This historic voyage, which had been Mikhail Lomonosov's dream, was organized by the All-Union Arctic Institute (now called the Arctic and Antarctic Research Institute).

Alexander Sibiryakov sailed on 28 June 1932 from the Krasny (previously Sobornoy) docks in Arkhangelsk, crossed the Kara Sea and chose a northern, unexplored way around Severnaya Zemlya to the Laptev Sea. In September, after calling at Tiksi and the mouth of the Kolyma, the propeller shaft broke and the icebreaker drifted for 11 days. However, Alexander Sibiryakov crossed the Chukchi Sea using improvised sails and arrived in the Bering Strait in October. Alexander Sibiryakov reached the Japanese port of Yokohama after 65 days, having covered more than 2,500 miles (4,000 km) in the Arctic seas. This was regarded as a heroic feat of Soviet polar seamen and Chief of Expedition Otto Schmidt and Captain Vladimir Voronin were received with many honors at their return to Russia.

On 24 November 1936 Alexander Sibiryakov was stranded near Cape Menshikov in the Kara Sea. She was refloated on 25 December 1936 and returned to service in June 1938.

== Wartime service and sinking ==
In September 1941 the Soviet Navy requisitioned Alexander Sibiryakov. She was given the pennant number LD-6. She continued in service, commanded by Captain Anatoli Kacharava. She was defensively armed, at first with several 76 mm (3 in) and 45 mm (2 in) guns. By 1942 one 4 in (102 mm) gun had been added.

On 25 August 1942 during Operation Wunderland the Kriegsmarine heavy cruiser Admiral Scheer attacked her off the northwest shore of Russky Island in the Nordenskiöld Archipelago. Despite being heavily outgunned, Alexander Sibiryakov managed to defend herself for an hour before Admiral Scheer sank her. Alexander Sibiryakov also sent a wireless telegraph signal that warned east and west bound Allied convoys of the attacks, enabling them to avoid the area.

Most members of Alexander Sibiryakov's crew were killed either in battle or when she sank. Admiral Scheer captured 22, including severely wounded Captain Kacharava. One crewman, stoker Pavel Vavilov, managed to reach Beluha Island and was rescued by a Soviet ship 34 or 35 days later. Due to the genocidal Nazi policies towards captured Soviet POWs, only 15 crew members survived the war. Soviet sources say 79 killed, 19 taken as prisoners of war, and only 13 of them survived captivity.

== Location of the wreck and memorials ==
The Soviet Union later sent several expedition to locate the wreck of the ship, including one in 1982, but none had achieved success. It was finally located in 2014 by a research expedition organized by a Russian private company 'Fertoing', and in 2015 the wreck was explored by a remotely operated underwater vehicle and divers, who collected some of the ship's parts as museum exhibits. A memorial plaque was affixed to the ship's hull in memory of the perished sailors.

On April 29, 1961, a Decree of the Presidium of the Supreme Soviet of the USSR awarded a number of crew members of the Alexander Sibiryakov "for the courage and fortitude shown by the crew members of the Order of the Red Banner icebreaker steamship A. Sibiryakov in battle with the fascist cruiser Admiral Scheer during the Great Patriotic War":

- Nikolai Grigoryevich Bochurko
- Semyon Fyodorovich Nikiforenko
- Zelik Abramovich Elimelakh
- Ivan Alekseyevich Alekseyev
- Serafim Izosimovich Gerega
- Ivan Fyodorovich Kopylov
- Andrei Tikhonovich Pavlovsky
- Fyodor Vasilyevich Sedunov

With the captain of the icebreaker, A. A. Kacharava, being awarded the Order of the Red Banner.

In 1965, the coordinates of the site of the battle and sinking of the icebreaker steamship Alexander Sibiryakov (76°12′00″N 91°30′00″E) were declared "a site of military glory". Long before this, even during the war years, a tradition had developed of ships lowering their flags and sounding their horns in salute when passing through this location.

In 1945, the name Sibiryakov was given to the Finnish icebreaker Jääkarhu (built 1926), received from Finland as war reparations.

In honor of the icebreaker's crew, a strait in the Kara Sea north of Dikson Island was named the Sibiryakovtsev Strait. The ship's name is also borne by a shoal in the Barents Sea near Novaya Zemlya and a mountain in Antarctica on Enderby Land. A number of islands in the Dikson area were named after members of the icebreaker's crew:

- Bochurko Island
- Elimelakh Island
- Dunayev Island
- Nikiforenko Island
- Ivanov Island
- Matveyev Island
- Proshin Island
- Vavilov Island

On Belukha Island (Elimelakh Island), a lighthouse was erected in memory of the ship's feat.

== Bibliography ==
- Armstrong, Terence (1958). The Russians in the Arctic: Aspects of Soviet exploration and exploitation of the far north, 1937–57. London: Methuen.
- Brown, Cassie; Horwood, Harold (1972). Death on the Ice: The Great Newfoundland Sealing Disaster of 1914. Toronto: Doubleday Canada. ISBN 978-0385050371.
- The Marconi Press Agency Ltd (1914). The Year Book of Wireless Telegraphy and Telephony. London: The Marconi Press Agency Ltd.
- "Steamers". Lloyd's Register of British and Foreign Shipping. London: Lloyd's Register of Shipping. 1911 – via Internet Archive.
- "Steamers". Lloyd's Register of British and Foreign Shipping. London: Lloyd's Register of Shipping. 1918 – via Internet Archive.
- "Steamers". Lloyd's Register of British and Foreign Shipping. London: Lloyd's Register of Shipping. 1920 – via Internet Archive.
- "Steamers". Lloyd's Register of British and Foreign Shipping. London: Lloyd's Register of Shipping. 1927 – via Internet Archive.
- "Steamers". Lloyd's Register of British and Foreign Shipping (PDF). London: Lloyd's Register of Shipping. 1933 – via Southampton City Council.
- "Steamers". Lloyd's Register of British and Foreign Shipping (PDF). London: Lloyd's Register of Shipping. 1934 – via Southampton City Council.
- "Steamers". Lloyd's Register of British and Foreign Shipping (PDF). London: Lloyd's Register of Shipping. 1935 – via Southampton City Council.
- "Steamers, Supplement". Lloyd's Register of British and Foreign Shipping (PDF). London: Lloyd's Register of Shipping. 1939 – via Southampton City Council.
- "Steamers". Lloyd's Register of British and Foreign Shipping (PDF). London: Lloyd's Register of Shipping. 1942 – via Southampton City Council.
