= Nansen Island (Kara Sea) =

Island in the coast of the Kara Sea

Coordinates: 76°13′N 94°45′E

Russian: Остров Нансена
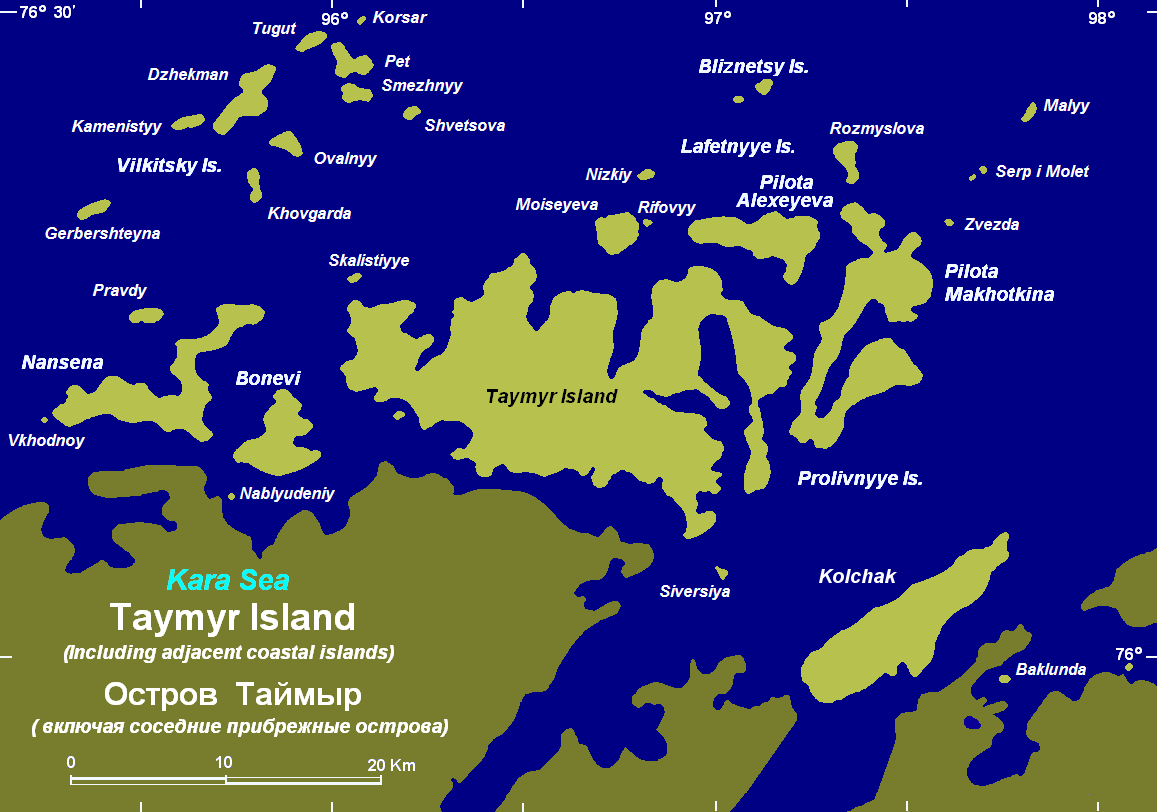
- Nansen Island (Nansena) is located on the left side of the map.

Geography
- Location: Kara Sea
- Archipelago: Nordenskiöld Archipelago
- Total islands: 1
- Length: 21 km (13 mi)
- Width: 2.5 km (1.55 mi)

Administration
- Russia

Demographics
- Population: uninhabited

Nansen Island (Russian: Остров Нансена), is a long and narrow island in the coast of the Kara Sea. Its length is 21 km (13 mi) and its average width about 2.5 km (1.6 mi). This island is located in an area of skerries right off the western coast of the Taymyr Peninsula.

== Geography ==
Nansen Island is one of the islands of the coastal area of the Nordenskiöld Archipelago. The narrow strait between Nansen island and the Siberian coast (Fram Strait) is about 2.5 km (1.6 mi) wide on average. Hovgaard Island lies about 8 kilometers (5.0 mi) north of the northern end of Nansen Island across the Matisen Strait.

The shores of Nansen Island and some of its larger neighboring islands, such as Taymyra, Bonevi and Pilota Makhotkina, are deeply indented, with many crooked inlets. The sounds between this island and neighboring islands are also somewhat labyrinthic. Geologically all these coastal islands are a continuation of the Nordenskiöld Archipelago which lies further north. And sometimes Nansen Island is considered a part of it. Ostrov Vkhodnoy is a 0.75 km (0.47 mi) long islet located off Nansena's western end.

The sea surrounding Nansen Island is covered with pack ice with some polynias during the long and bitter winters and there are many ice floes even in the summer.

Nansen Island belongs to the Krasnoyarsk Krai administrative division of Russia and is part of the Great Arctic State Nature Reserve – the largest nature reserve of Russia and one of the biggest in the world.

== History ==
In October 1900, during Baron Eduard von Toll’s fateful last expedition, the winter quarters for Toll's ship Zarya were set at Nablyudeniy Island and a scientific station was built there. Nablyudeniy is a small granite island south of neighbouring Bonevi Island located in a bay that Baron Toll named Colin Archer Bay (Bukhta Kolin Archera).

During WW2 there was much military activity near Nansen Island, especially during Operation Wunderland.

In some maps Nansen Island is named simply as Nansena. This island should not be confused with another Russian island called Nansen Island, which is part of Franz Josef Land, in the Arctic Ocean. Both islands are named in the honor and memory of Arctic explorer Fridtjof Nansen.

== See also ==
- List of islands of Russia
