= Vkhodnoy Island (Kara Sea) =

Island in the Kara Sea

Coordinates: 76°11′N 94°25′E

Russian: Остров Входной
- Location in the Nordenskjold Archipelago.
- Interactive map of Vkhodnoy Island

Geography
- Location: Kara Sea
- Archipelago: Nordenskiöld Archipelago
- Total islands: 1
- Length: 0.7 km (0.43 mi)
- Width: 0.3 km (0.19 mi)

Administration
- Russia

Demographics
- Population: uninhabited

Vkhodnoy Island (Russian: Остров Входной), is a small island in the Kara Sea. It is one of the islands of the coastal area of the Nordenskiöld Archipelago.

== Geography ==
Vkhodnoy is a 0.75 km (0.47 mi) long island located 600 m (2,000 ft) to the west of Cape Johansen (Mys Iogansena), the westernmost headland of Nansen Island. It lies on the northern side of Fram Strait, the strait between Nansen island and the Siberian coast, which is about 2.5 km (1.6 mi) wide on average. The Ledyanyye Islands lie 13 km (8.1 mi) to the east.

Geologically all these coastal islands are a continuation of the Nordenskiöld Archipelago which lies further north. The sea surrounding neighbouring Nansen Island is covered with pack ice with some polynias during the long and harsh winters and there are many ice floes even in the summer.

Vkhodnoy Island belongs to the Taymyrsky Dolgano-Nenetsky District of the Krasnoyarsk Krai administrative division of Russia and is part of the Great Arctic State Nature Reserve – the largest nature reserve of Russia and one of the biggest in the world.

== History ==
In October 1900, during Baron Eduard von Toll’s fateful last expedition, the winter quarters for Toll's ship Zarya were set nearby at Nablyudeniy Island and a scientific station was built there. Nablyudeniy is a small granite island south of Bonevi Island located in a bay that Baron Toll named Colin Archer Bay (Bukhta Kolin Archera).

== See also ==
- List of islands of Russia
