= Wilhelm Meendsen-Bohlken =

German Kriegsmarine vice admiral (1897–1985)

- Born: 25 June 1897; Brake
- Died: 20 August 1985 (aged 88); Cologne
- Military career
- Allegiance: Nazi Germany
- Branch: Kriegsmarine
- Rank: Vizeadmiral
- Commands: Cruiser Admiral Scheer
- Conflicts: World War I World War II
- Awards: Knight's Cross of the Iron Cross

Wilhelm Meendsen-Bohlken (25 June 1897 – 20 August 1985) was a Vizeadmiral with the Kriegsmarine during World War II. He was a recipient of the Knight's Cross of the Iron Cross of Nazi Germany. From July 1944 to May 1945 he served as the final fleet commander of the Kriegsmarine.

== Awards ==
- Iron Cross (1914) 2nd Class (1 July 1916) & 1st Class (30 December 1919)
- U-boat War Badge (1914) (October 1918)
- Clasp to the Iron Cross (1939) 2nd Class (10 June 1942) & 1st Class (30 August 1942)
- Knight's Cross of the Iron Cross on 15 May 1944 as Konteradmiral and Befehlshaber der deutsches Marinekommandos in Italien (Commander-in-chief of the German Naval Commando in Italy)

Military offices
| Preceded by Generaladmiral Otto Schniewind | Fleet Commander of the Kriegsmarine; July 1944 – May 1945 | Succeeded by none |
