= German cruiser Admiral Scheer =

German warship, 1934–45

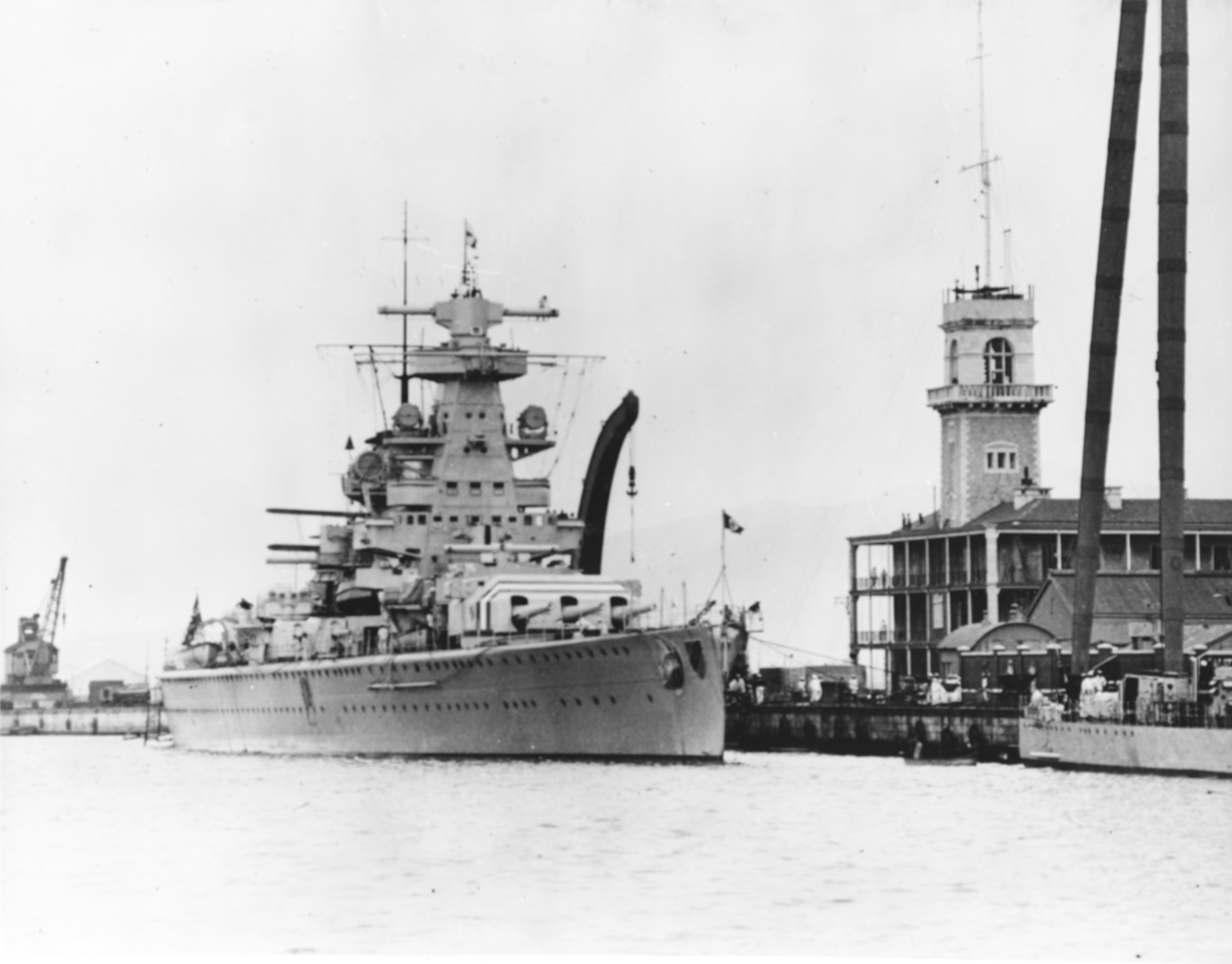
- Admiral Scheer in Gibraltar in 1936

History

Nazi Germany
- Name: Admiral Scheer
- Namesake: Reinhard Scheer
- Builder: Reichsmarinewerft Wilhelmshaven
- Laid down: 25 June 1931
- Launched: 1 April 1933
- Commissioned: 12 November 1934
- Fate: Sunk by air attack, 9 April 1945, partially scrapped and buried 54°19′16″N 10°09′48″E

General characteristics
- Class & type: Deutschland-class cruiser
- Displacement: Design: 13,660 t (13,440 long tons); Full load: 15,420 t (15,180 long tons)
- Length: 186 m (610 ft 3 in)
- Beam: 21.34 m (70 ft 0 in)
- Draft: 7.25 m (23 ft 9 in)
- Installed power: 54,000 PS (53,260 shp; 39,720 kW)
- Propulsion: 8 × MAN diesel engines; 2 × screw propellers
- Speed: 28.3 kn (52.4 km/h; 32.6 mph)
- Range: 9,100 nmi (16,900 km; 10,500 mi) at 20 kn (37 km/h; 23 mph)
- Complement: As built: 33 officers; 586 enlisted; After 1935: 30 officers; 921–1,040 enlisted
- Sensors & processing systems: 1940: FMG 39 G(gO); 1941: MG 40 G(gO); FuMO 26
- Armament: 6 × 28 cm (11 in) in triple turrets; 8 × 15 cm (5.9 in) in single turrets; 8 × 53.3 cm (21.0 in) torpedo tubes
- Armor: main turrets: 140 mm (5.5 in); belt: 80 mm (3.1 in); deck: 45 mm (1.8 in)
- Aircraft carried: 1 × Heinkel He 60 seaplane
- Aviation facilities: One catapult

Admiral Scheer (German pronunciation: [atmiˈʁaːl ˈʃeːɐ̯]) was a Deutschland-class heavy cruiser (often termed a pocket battleship) which served with the Kriegsmarine (Navy) of Nazi Germany during World War II. The vessel was named after Admiral Reinhard Scheer, German commander in the Battle of Jutland. She was laid down at the Reichsmarinewerft shipyard in Wilhelmshaven in June 1931 and completed by November 1934. Originally classified as an armored ship (Panzerschiff) by the Reichsmarine, in February 1940 the Germans reclassified the remaining two ships of this class as heavy cruisers. (Note: The third ship, Admiral Graf Spee, had been scuttled following the Battle of the River Plate.)

The ship was nominally under the 10,160-tonne (10,000-long-ton) limitation on warship size imposed by the Treaty of Versailles, though with a full load displacement of 15,420 tonnes (15,180 long tons), she significantly exceeded it. Armed with six 28 cm (11 in) guns in two triple gun turrets, Admiral Scheer and her sisters were designed to outgun any cruiser fast enough to catch them. Their top speed of 28 knots (52 km/h; 32 mph) left only a handful of ships in the Anglo-French navies able to catch them and powerful enough to sink them.

Admiral Scheer saw heavy service with the German Navy, including a deployment to Spain during the Spanish Civil War, where she bombarded the port of Almería. Her first operation during World War II was a commerce raiding operation into the southern Atlantic Ocean, with a brief foray into the Indian Ocean. During this operation, she sank 113,223 gross register tons (GRT) of shipping, making her the most successful capital ship surface raider of the war. After returning to Germany, she was deployed to northern Norway to interdict shipping to the Soviet Union. She was part of an abortive attack on Convoy PQ 17 and conducted Operation Wunderland, a sortie into the Kara Sea. After returning to Germany at the end of 1942, she served as a training ship until the end of 1944, when she was used to support ground operations against the Soviet Army. She moved to Kiel for repairs in March 1945, where she was capsized by British bombers in a raid on 9 April 1945. She was partially scrapped and the remainder of the wreck was buried when the inner part of Kiel dockyard was filled in after the war.

== Design ==
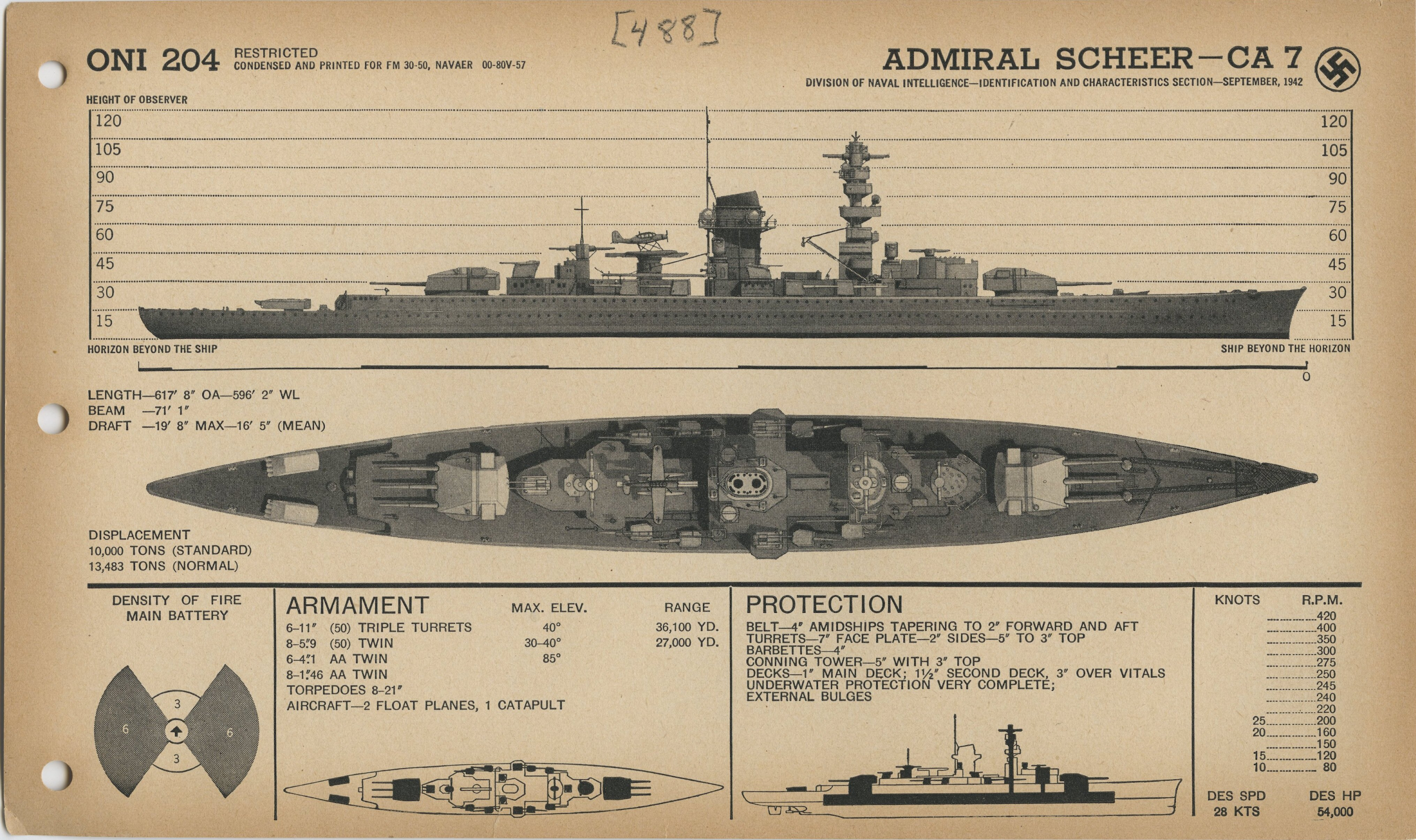
Recognition drawing of Admiral Scheer as she appeared in 1942

Admiral Scheer was 186 metres (610 ft) long overall and had a beam of 21.34 metres (70 ft) and a maximum draft of 7.25 metres (23 ft 9 in). The ship had a design displacement of 13,660 metric tons (13,440 long tons) and a full load displacement of 15,420 tonnes (15,180 long tons), though the ship was officially stated to be within the 10,160-tonne (10,000-long-ton) limit of the Treaty of Versailles. Admiral Scheer was powered by four sets of MAN nine-cylinder double-acting two-stroke diesel engines. The ship's top speed was 28.3 knots (52.4 km/h; 32.6 mph), at 54,000 PS (53,260 shp; 39,720 kW). At a cruising speed of 20 knots (37 km/h; 23 mph), the ship could steam for 9,100 nautical miles (16,900 km; 10,500 mi). As designed, her standard complement consisted of 33 officers and 586 enlisted men, though after 1935 this was significantly increased to 30 officers and 921–1,040 sailors.

Admiral Scheer's primary armament was six 28 cm (11 in) SK C/28 guns mounted in two triple gun turrets, one forward and one aft of the superstructure. The ship carried a secondary battery of eight 15 cm (5.9 in) SK C/28 guns in single turrets grouped amidships. Her heavy anti-aircraft battery consisted of three twin 8.8 cm L/78 guns. These guns were directed by three SL-4 director posts, installed on each side of the funnel and above the signal bridge. Her middle and light anti-aircraft armament consisted of four twin-mounted 3.7 cm (1.5 in) C/30 guns and ten single 2 cm (0.79 in) Flak 30 guns. During her refit in 1939-40 the 8.8 cm guns were replaced by three twin 10.5 cm (4.1 in) C/33 guns, two single 2 cm were landed and two quad 2 cm were added. In 1944 her light anti-aircraft armament consisted of five quad and nine single 2 cm guns By 1945, the anti-aircraft battery had again been reorganized and comprised six 4 cm guns, eight 3.7 cm guns, and thirty-three 2 cm guns.

The ship also carried a pair of quadruple 53.3 cm (21 in) deck-mounted torpedo tubes placed on her stern. The ship was equipped with one Heinkel He 60 seaplane and one catapult. (Note: Only the first ship of the class, Deutschland, had fittings installed to carry an optional second floatplane.) Admiral Scheer's armored belt was 60 to 80 mm (2.4 to 3.1 in) thick; her upper deck was 17 mm (0.67 in) thick while the main armored deck was 17 to 45 mm (0.67 to 1.77 in) thick. The main battery turrets had 140 mm (5.5 in) thick faces and 80 mm thick sides. Radar initially consisted of a FMG 39 G(gO) set, though in 1941 this was replaced with an FMG 40 G(gO) set and a FuMO 26 system. (Note: FMG stands for Funkmess Gerät (meaning 'radar equipment'), while the numerical digits denote the model year of the device. "G" denoted that the equipment was manufactured by GEMA, "g" indicated that it operated between 335 and 440 MHz, while "O" indicated the positioning of the set atop of the forward rangefinder. FuMO stands for Funkmess-Ortung (meaning 'detection radar').)

== Service history ==
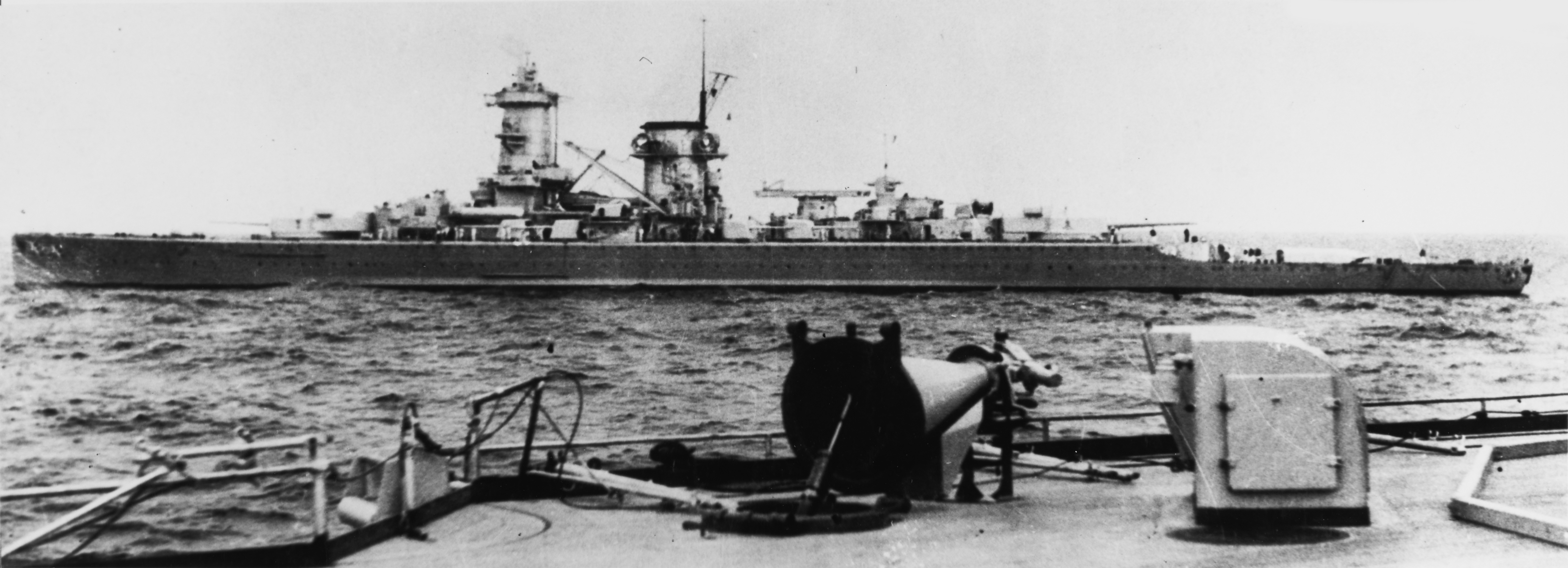
Admiral Scheer in 1935

Admiral Scheer was ordered by the Reichsmarine from the Reichsmarinewerft shipyard in Wilhelmshaven. Naval rearmament was not popular with the Social Democrats and the Communists in the German Reichstag, so it was not until 1931 that a bill was passed to build a second Panzerschiff. The money for Panzerschiff B, which was ordered as Ersatz Lothringen, was secured after the Social Democrats abstained to prevent a political crisis. Her keel was laid on 25 June 1931, under construction number 123. The ship was launched on 1 April 1933; at her launching, she was christened by Marianne Besserer, the daughter of Admiral Reinhard Scheer, the ship's namesake. She was completed slightly over a year and a half later on 12 November 1934, the day she was commissioned into the German fleet. The old pre-dreadnought battleship Hessen was removed from service and her crew transferred to the newly commissioned panzerschiff.

At her commissioning in November 1934, Admiral Scheer was placed under the command of Kapitän zur See (KzS) Wilhelm Marschall. The ship spent the remainder of 1934 conducting sea trials and training her crew. In 1935, she had a new catapult and landing sail system to operate her Heinkel HE 60 seaplanes on heavy seas installed. From 1 October 1935 to 26 July 1937 her first officer was Leopold Bürkner, later to become head of foreign intelligence in the Third Reich. By October 1935, the ship was ready for her first major cruise, when on 25–28 October she visited Madeira, returning to Kiel on 8 November. The following summer, she cruised out through the Skagerrak and the English Channel into the Irish Sea, before visiting Stockholm on the return voyage.

=== Spanish Civil War ===
Admiral Scheer's first overseas deployment began in July 1936 when she was sent to Spain to evacuate German civilians caught in the midst of the Spanish Civil War. From 8 August 1936 she served together with her sister ship Deutschland on non-intervention patrols off the Republican-held coast of Spain. She served four tours of duty with the non-intervention patrol through June 1937. Her official objective was to control the influx of war materiel into Spain, though she also recorded Soviet ships carrying supplies to the Republicans and protected ships delivering German weapons to Nationalist forces. During the deployment to Spain, Ernst Lindemann served as the ship's first gunnery officer. After Deutschland was attacked on 29 May 1937 by Spanish Republican Air Force aircraft off Ibiza, Admiral Scheer was ordered to bombard the Republican-held port of Almería in reprisal. On 31 May 1937, the anniversary of the Battle of Jutland, Admiral Scheer, flying the Imperial War Flag, arrived off Almería at 07:29 and opened fire on shore batteries, naval installations and ships in the harbor. On 26 June 1937, she was relieved by her sister ship Admiral Graf Spee, allowing her to return to Wilhelmshaven on 1 July. She returned to the Mediterranean between August and October, however. In September 1936 KzS Otto Ciliax had replaced Marschall as the ship's commanding officer.

=== World War II ===
At the outbreak of World War II in September 1939, Admiral Scheer remained at anchor in the Schillig roadstead outside Wilhelmshaven, with the heavy cruiser Admiral Hipper. On 4 September, two groups of five Bristol Blenheim bombers attacked the ships. The first group surprised the anti-aircraft gunners aboard Admiral Scheer, who nevertheless managed to shoot down one of the five Blenheims. One bomb struck the ship's deck and failed to explode, and two detonated in the water near the ship. The remaining bombs also failed to explode. The second group of five Blenheims were confronted by the alerted German defenses, which shot down four of the five bombers. Admiral Scheer emerged from the attack undamaged. In November 1939, KzS Theodor Krancke became the ship's commanding officer.

Admiral Scheer underwent a refit while her sister ships set out on commerce raiding operations in the Atlantic. Around this time the ship received two of its Arado Ar 196 floatplanes. Admiral Scheer was modified during the early months of 1940, including the installation of a new, raked clipper bow. The heavy command tower was replaced with a lighter structure, and she was reclassified as a heavy cruiser. Additional anti-aircraft guns were also installed, along with updated radar equipment. On 19–20 July RAF bombers attacked Admiral Scheer and the battleship Tirpitz, though they failed to score any hits. On 27 July, the ship was pronounced ready for service.

==== Atlantic sortie ====
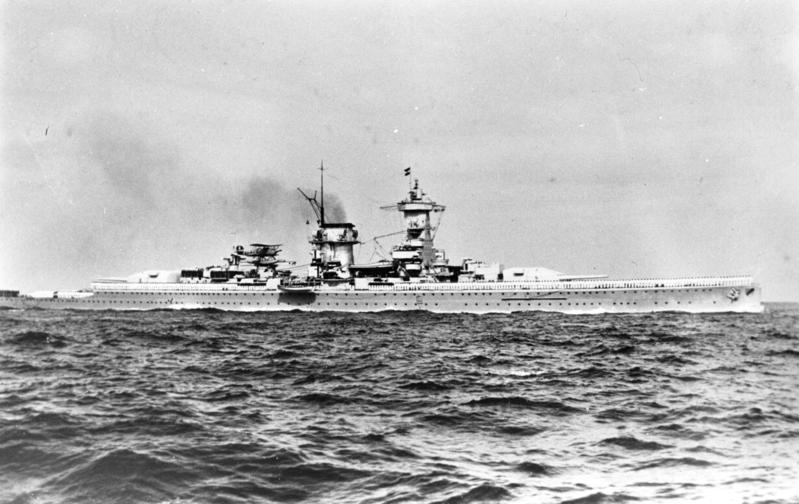
Admiral Scheer

Admiral Scheer sailed in October 1940 on her first combat sortie. On the night of 31 October she slipped through the Denmark Strait and broke into the open Atlantic. Her B-Dienst radio intercept equipment identified the convoy HX 84, sailing from Halifax, Nova Scotia. Admiral Scheer's Arado seaplane located the convoy on 5 November 1940. The armed merchant cruiser HMS Jervis Bay, the sole escort for the convoy, issued a report of the German raider and attempted to prevent her from attacking the convoy, which was ordered to scatter under cover of a smoke screen. Admiral Scheer's first salvo scored hits on Jervis Bay, disabling her wireless equipment and steering gear. Shells from her second salvo struck the bridge and killed her commander, Edward Fegen. Admiral Scheer sank Jervis Bay within 22 minutes, but the engagement delayed the German ship long enough for most of the convoy to escape. Admiral Scheer sank only 5 of the convoy's 37 ships, though a 6th was sunk by the Luftwaffe following the convoy's dispersal.

On 18 December, Admiral Scheer encountered the refrigerator ship Duquesa, 8,651 GRT. The ship sent off a distress signal, which the German raider deliberately allowed, to draw British naval forces to the area. Krancke wanted to lure British warships to the area to draw attention away from Admiral Hipper, which had just exited the Denmark Strait. The aircraft carriers HMS Formidable and Hermes, the cruisers Dorsetshire, Neptune, and Dragon, and the armed merchant cruiser Pretoria Castle converged to hunt down the German raider, but she eluded the British.

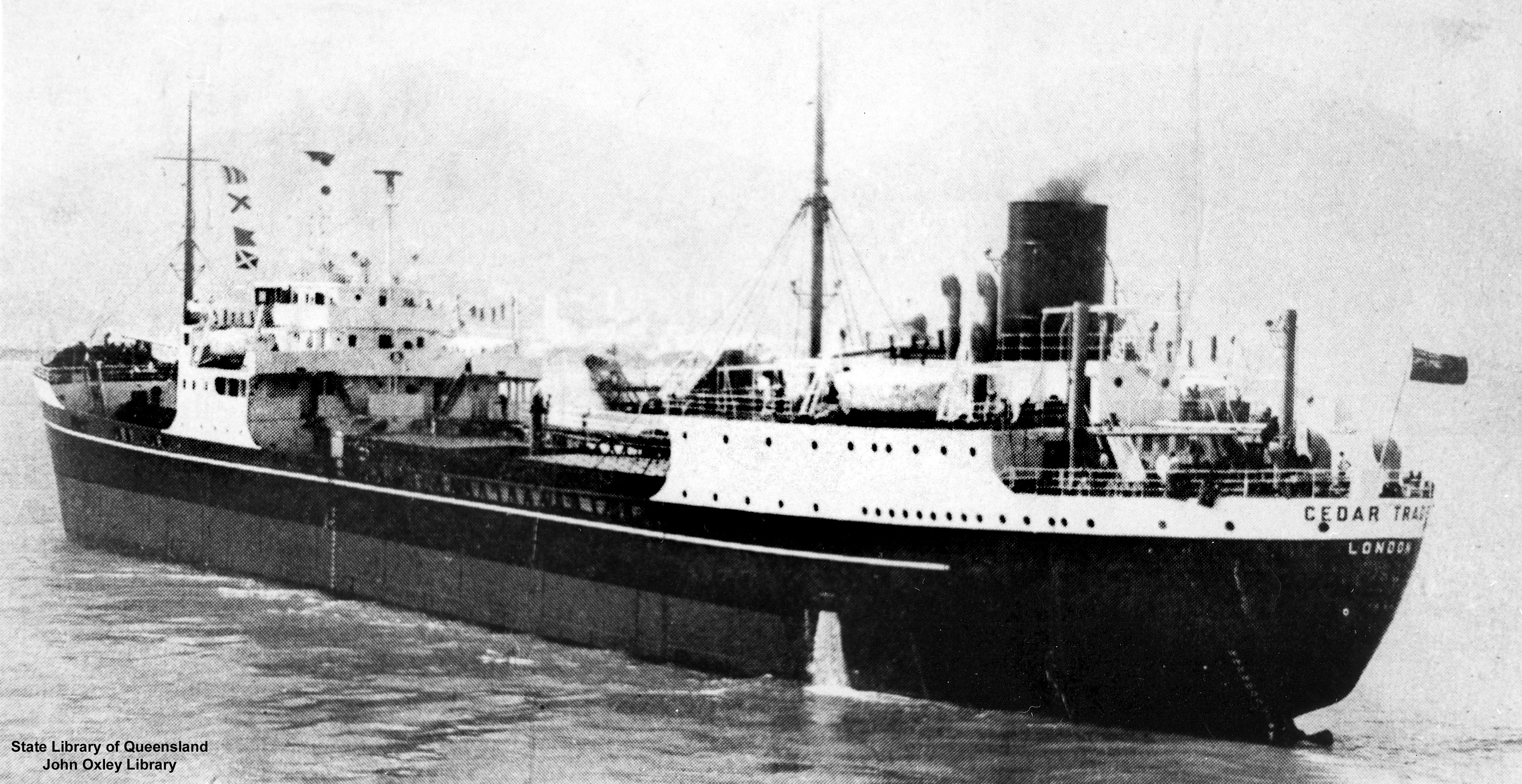
Admiral Scheer captured the Norwegian 8,038 GRT oil tanker Sandefjord on 18 January 1941, put a prize crew aboard and used her to send prisoners to Bordeaux. After the war Sandefjord was rebuilt as the British bulk carrier Cedar Trader, shown here.

Between 26 December and 7 January, Admiral Scheer rendezvoused with the supply ships Nordmark and Eurofeld, the auxiliary cruiser Thor, and the prizes Duquesa and Storstad. The raiders transferred some 600 prisoners to Storstad while they refueled from Nordmark and Eurofeld. Between 18 and 20 January Admiral Scheer captured three Allied merchant ships totalling 18,738 GRT, including the Norwegian oil tanker Sandefjord. She spent Christmas 1940 at sea in the mid-Atlantic, several hundred miles from Tristan da Cunha, before making a foray into the Indian Ocean in February 1941.

On 14 February, Admiral Scheer rendezvoused with the auxiliary cruiser Atlantis and the supply ship Tannenfels about 1,000 nmi (1,900 km; 1,200 mi) east of Madagascar. The raiders resupplied from Tannenfels and exchanged information on Allied merchant traffic in the area, parting company on 17 February. Admiral Scheer then steamed to the Seychelles north of Madagascar, where she found two merchant vessels with her Arado floatplanes. She took the 6,994 GRT oil tanker British Advocate as a prize and sank the 2,456 GRT Greek-flagged Grigorios. A third ship, the 7,178 GRT Canadian Cruiser, managed to send a distress signal before Admiral Scheer sank her on 21 February. The raider encountered and sank a fourth ship the following day, the 2,542 GRT Dutch steamer Rantaupandjang, though she too was able to send a distress signal before she sank.

The British cruiser HMS Glasgow, which was patrolling in the area, received both messages from Admiral Scheer's victims. Glasgow launched reconnaissance aircraft that spotted Admiral Scheer on 22 February. Vice Admiral Ralph Leatham, the commander of the East Indies Station, deployed the carrier Hermes and cruisers Capetown, Emerald, Hawkins, Shropshire, and the Australian HMAS Canberra to join the hunt. Krancke turned to the south-east to evade his pursuers, reaching the South Atlantic by 3 March. The British, meanwhile, had abandoned the hunt on 25 February when it became clear that Admiral Scheer had withdrawn from the area.

Admiral Scheer then sailed northwards, breaking through the Denmark Strait on 26–27 March and evading the cruisers Fiji and Nigeria. She reached Bergen, Norway on 30 March, where she spent a day in the Grimstadfjord. A destroyer escort joined the ship for the voyage to Kiel, which they reached on 1 April. In the course of her raiding operation, she had steamed over 46,000 nautical miles (85,000 km) and sunk seventeen merchant ships for a total of 113,223 GRT. She was by far the most successful German capital ship commerce raider of the entire war. After returning to Germany, Krancke left the ship and was replaced by KzS Wilhelm Meendsen-Bohlken in June 1941. The loss of the battleship Bismarck in May 1941, and more importantly, the Royal Navy's destruction of the German supply ship network in the aftermath of the Bismarck operation forced a planned Atlantic raiding operation for Admiral Scheer and her sister Lützow at the end of 1941 to be abandoned. From 4 to 8 September, Admiral Scheer was briefly moved to Oslo. There, on 5 and 8 September, No. 90 Squadron RAF, equipped with Boeing B-17 Flying Fortress bombers, mounted a pair of unsuccessful attacks on the ship. On 8 September, the ship left Oslo and returned to Swinemünde.

==== Deployment to Norway ====
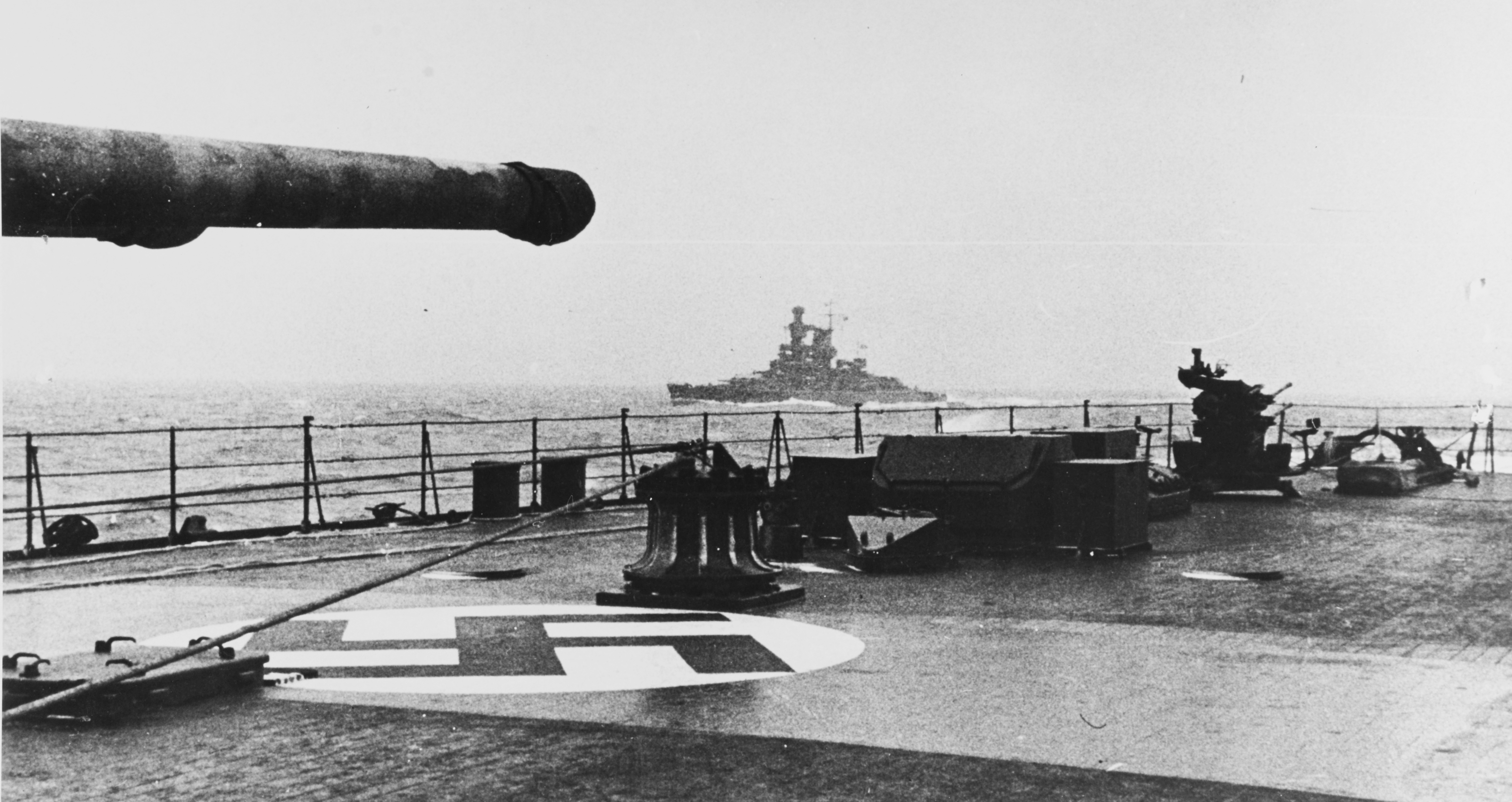
Admiral Scheer, photographed from Prinz Eugen en route to Norway

On 21 February 1942, Admiral Scheer, the heavy cruiser Prinz Eugen, and the destroyers Z4 Richard Beitzen, Z5 Paul Jakobi, Z25, Z7 Hermann Schoemann, and Z14 Friedrich Ihn steamed to Norway. After stopping briefly in Grimstadfjord, the ships proceeded on to Trondheim. On 23 February, the British submarine Trident torpedoed Prinz Eugen, causing serious damage. The first operation in Norway in which Admiral Scheer took part was Operation Rösselsprung, in July 1942. On 2 July, the ship sortied as part of the attempt to intercept Arctic convoy PQ-17. Admiral Scheer and Lützow formed one group while Tirpitz and Admiral Hipper composed another. While en route to the rendezvous point, Lützow and three destroyers ran aground, forcing the entire group to abandon the operation. Admiral Scheer was detached to join Tirpitz and Admiral Hipper in Altafjord. The British detected the German departure and ordered the convoy to scatter. Aware that surprise had been lost, the Germans broke off the surface attack and turned the destruction of PQ-17 over to the U-boats and Luftwaffe. Twenty-four of the convoy's thirty-five transports were sunk.

In August 1942, she conducted Operation Wunderland, a sortie into the Kara Sea to interdict Soviet shipping and attack targets of opportunity. The length of the mission and the distances involved precluded a destroyer escort for the operation; three destroyers would escort Admiral Scheer until they reached Novaya Zemlya, at which point they would return to Norway. Two U-boats — U-251 and U-456 — patrolled the Kara Gate and the Yugorsky Strait. The Germans originally intended to send Admiral Scheer with her sister ship Lützow, but since the latter had run aground the previous month, she was unavailable for the operation.

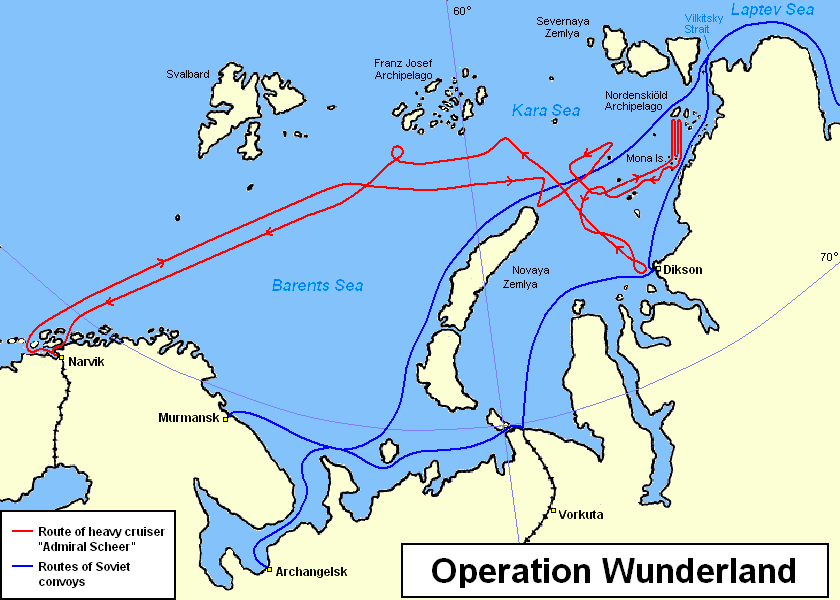
Map showing the route taken by Admiral Scheer during Operation Wunderland

The operational plan called for strict radio silence to ensure surprise could be maintained. This required Meendsen-Bohlken to have total tactical and operational control of his ship; shore-based commands would be unable to direct the mission. On 16 August, Admiral Scheer and her destroyer escort left Narvik on a course to pass to the north of Novaya Zemlya. Upon entering the Kara Sea, she encountered heavy ice; in addition to searching for merchant shipping, the Arado floatplane was used to scout paths through the ice fields. On 25 August, she encountered the Soviet icebreaker Sibiryakov. Admiral Scheer sank the icebreaker, but not before she sent a distress signal. The German ship then turned south, and two days later, arrived off the port of Dikson. Admiral Scheer damaged two ships in the port and shelled harbor facilities. Meendsen-Bohlken considered sending a landing party ashore, but firing from Soviet shore batteries convinced him to abandon the plan. After breaking off the bombardment, Meendsen-Bohlken decided to return to Narvik. She reached port on 30 August without having achieved any significant successes.

On 23 October Admiral Scheer, Tirpitz and the destroyers Z4 Richard Beitzen, Z16 Friedrich Eckoldt, Z23, Z28, and Z29 left Bogen Bay and proceeded to Trondheim. There, Tirpitz stopped for repairs, while Admiral Scheer and Z28 continued on to Germany. Fregattenkapitän Ernst Gruber served as the ship's acting commander at the end of November. In December 1942, Admiral Scheer returned to Wilhelmshaven for major overhaul, where she was attacked and slightly damaged by RAF bombers. Consequently, Admiral Scheer moved to the less exposed port of Swinemünde. In February 1943, KzS Richard Rothe-Roth took command of the ship. Until the end of 1944, Admiral Scheer was part of the Fleet Training Group.

==== Return to the Baltic ====
KzS Ernst-Ludwig Thienemann, the ship's final commander, took command of Admiral Scheer in April 1944. On 22 November 1944, Admiral Scheer, the destroyers Z25 and Z35, and the 2nd Torpedo Boat Flotilla relieved the cruiser Prinz Eugen and several destroyers supporting German forces fighting the Soviets on the Estonian island of Saaremaa (Ösel) in the Baltic. The Soviet Air Force launched several air attacks on the German forces, all of which were successfully repelled by heavy anti-aircraft fire. The ship's Arado floatplane was shot down, however. On the night of 23–24 November, the German naval forces completed the evacuation of the island. In all, 4,694 troops were evacuated from the island.

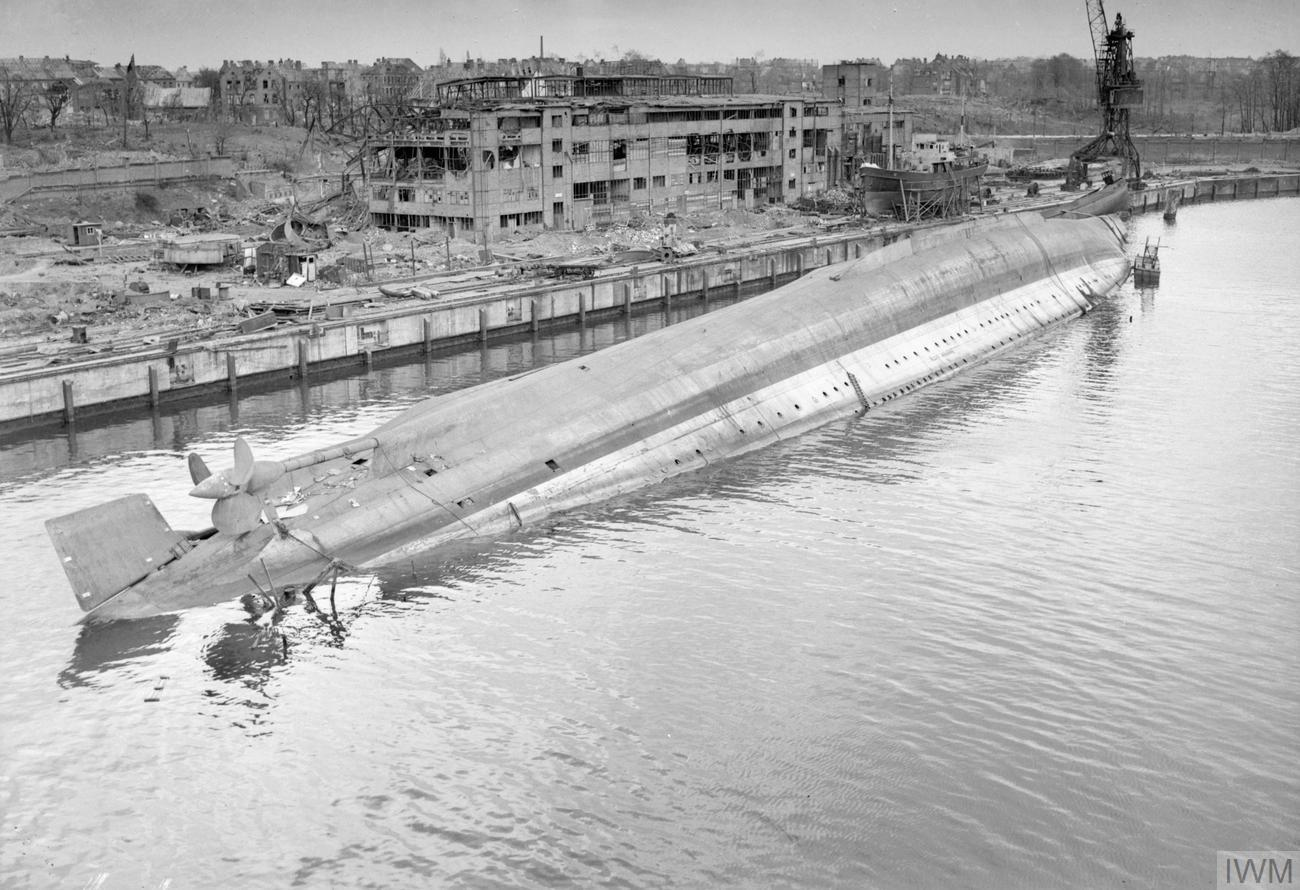
Admiral Scheer capsized in Kiel

In early February 1945, Admiral Scheer stood off Samland with several torpedo boats in support of German forces fighting Soviet advances. On 9 February, the ships began shelling Soviet positions. Between 18 and 24 February, German forces launched a local counterattack; Admiral Scheer and the torpedo boats provided artillery support, targeting Soviet positions near Peyse and Gross-Heydekrug. The German attack temporarily restored the land connection to Königsberg. The ship's guns were badly worn out by March and in need of repair. On 8 March, Admiral Scheer departed the eastern Baltic to have her guns relined in Kiel; she carried 800 civilian refugees and 200 wounded soldiers. An uncleared minefield prevented her from reaching Kiel, and so she unloaded her passengers in Swinemünde. Despite her worn-out gun barrels, the ship then shelled Soviet forces outside Kolberg until she used up her remaining ammunition.

The ship then loaded refugees and left Swinemünde; she successfully navigated the minefields on the way to Kiel, arriving on 18 March. Her stern turret had its guns replaced at the Deutsche Werke shipyard by early April. During the repair process, most of the ship's crew went ashore. On the night of 9 April 1945, a general RAF bombing raid by over 300 aircraft struck the harbor in Kiel. Admiral Scheer was hit by bombs and capsized. She was partially broken up for scrap after the end of the war, though part of the hull was left in place and buried with rubble from the attack when the inner harbors were filled in post-war. The number of casualties from her loss is unknown.

In 2024, an industrial archeologist and a geophysicist, along with a team of researchers using reflection seismology, examined a parking lot of a navy arsenal in Kiel where they suspected the wreck was buried. Some 70 percent of Admiral Scheer was located, including the main guns and superstructure.
