= Muscovy Company =

16th-century English business enterprise

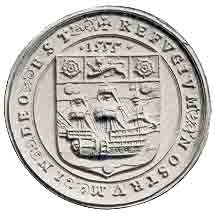
- Seal of the Muscovy Company, showing the date 1555 above an escutcheon of arms: Barry wavy of six argent and azure, over all a ship of three masts in full sail towards sinister proper, sails, pennants, and ensigns of the first, each charged with a cross gules all between three bezants, a chief or, on a pale between two roses gules seeded or, barbed vert, a lion passant guardant of the fifth All encircled by motto: Refugium Nostrum in Deo Est ("Our Refuge is in God"). The ship is shown, unusually for heraldry, sailing towards the sinister, signifying "The East"
- Type: Trading company; charity
- Industry: Trading company; now a charitable organization
- Predecessor: Company of Merchant Adventurers to New Lands
- Founded: 6 February 1555; 471 years ago in England
- Founders: Richard Chancellor, Sebastian Cabot and Sir Hugh Willoughby
- Fate: Existed until 1917 as a trading company. Now operates mainly as a charity.

The Muscovy Company (also called the Russia Company or the Muscovy Trading Company; Russian: Московская компания, romanized: Moskovskaya kompaniya) was an English trading company chartered in 1555. It was the first major chartered joint-stock company, the precursor of the type of business that would soon flourish in England and finance its exploration of the world. The Muscovy Company had a monopoly on trade between England and Russia until 1698 and it survived as a trading company until the Russian Revolution. Since 1917, the company has operated as a charity, now working within Russia.

== History ==
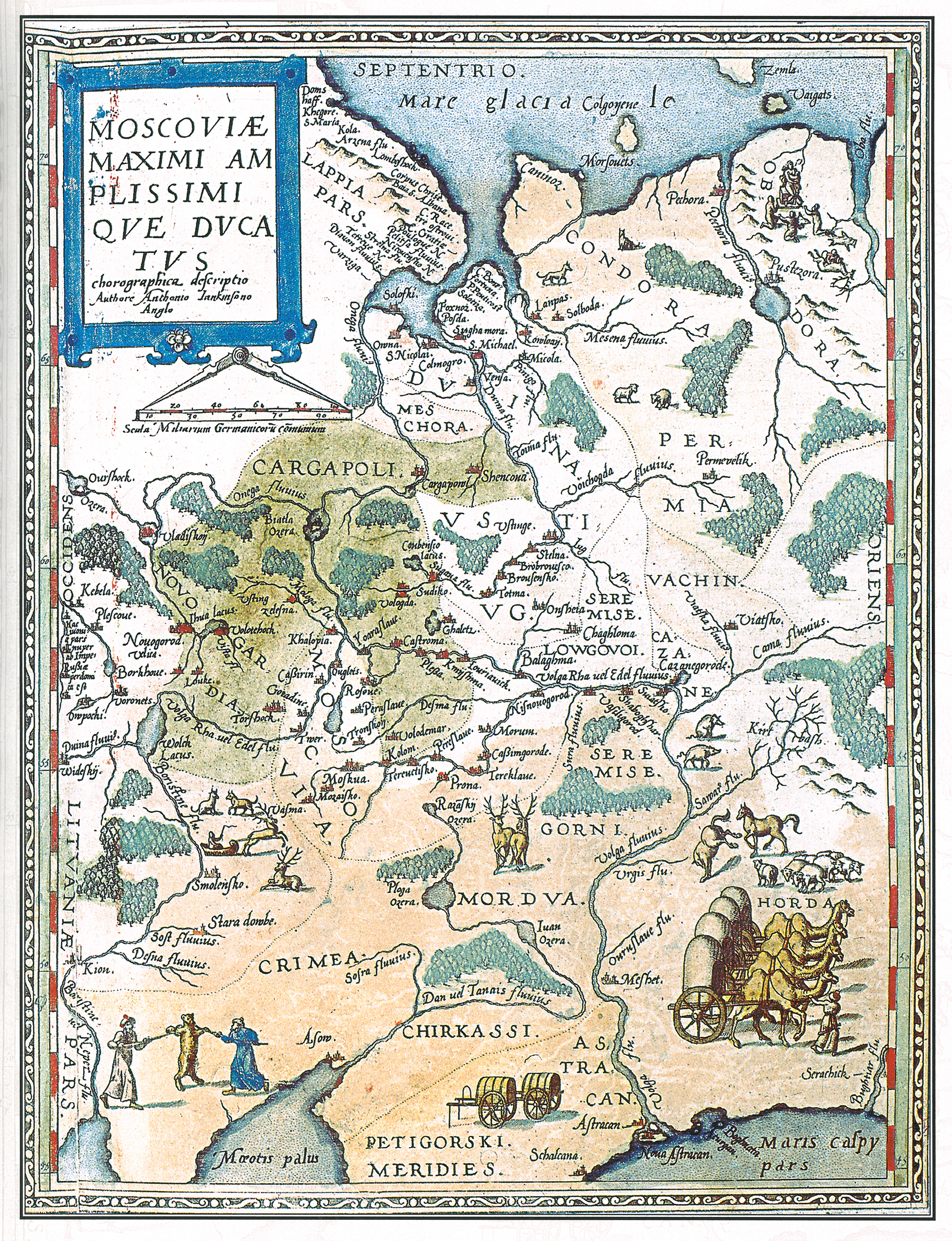
Map of Muscovy prepared by Anthony Jenkinson and Gerard de Jode (1593)

Ivan IV of Russia Shows His Treasury to Jerome Horsey (Alexander Litovchenko, 1875)

=== Company of Merchant Adventurers to New Lands ===
The Muscovy Company traces its roots to the Company of Merchant Adventurers to New Lands (in full: "Mystery and Company of Merchant Adventurers for the Discovery of Regions, Dominions, Islands, and Places unknown") founded in 1551 by Thomas White, Richard Chancellor, Sebastian Cabot and Sir Hugh Willoughby, who decided to look for the Northeast Passage to China.

The first expedition of the Company of Merchant Adventurers was led by Willoughby, for his military leadership skills after esteemed service against the Scots defending English castles in the north of the country. He had no prior nautical or navigational experience and it was hoped he would transition into naval life with the same aplomb he showed on land. Chancellor would function as the navigator of the small fleet, which consisted of three ships: the Bona Esperanza under Willoughby, the Edward Bonaventure under Chancellor and the Bona Confidentia. The fleet departed from London on 10 May 1553, but near the Lofoten islands a storm hit the ships and separated Chancellor's vessel from the other two.

Willoughby eventually crossed the Barents Sea and reached Novaya Zemlya. He spent some time sailing along the coast, then turned south towards Scandinavia. However at the mouth of the Varzina River on the coast to the east of present-day Murmansk the ship became trapped in ice. Willoughby and his crew were found a few years later by Russian fishermen who stumbled across the ship frozen in ice. Forcing entry into the ship, they found the bodies of Willoughby and his men frozen solid. It has been assumed that the men froze after a cold Russian winter aboard the ship, however, Willoughby and his men were well supplied for a winter aboard a ship – they had supplies of food enough for a journey meant for Asia and they had many woollen garments meant for trading in any destination they might have ended up in. It has therefore been posited by historians that Willoughby and his crew died not from exposure to the elements, but from carbon monoxide poisoning. The surrounding bay would have had ample supplies of sea coal and it was likely that men would have been sent out to gather material to keep them warm, and any combustion of sea coal in an enclosed area could easily have led to their deaths in a small ship hold. At any rate, Willoughby sent out scouts in various directions with the instruction to return after three days travelling if they had not found any human contact. All of these journeys failed.

Chancellor was luckier. He penetrated the White Sea, where the local fishermen were amazed by the great size of his Western-built ship. He reached the harbour of Nikolo-Korelsky Monastery on the Northern Dvina river (near the present-day Arkhangelsk, which would be eventually founded in 1584 to service the growing trade). The region had just recently been added to Muscovy, and when Tsar Ivan IV heard of Chancellor's arrival, he immediately invited the exotic guest to visit Moscow for an audience at the royal court.

Chancellor made the journey of over 600 miles (970 km) to Moscow through snow- and ice-covered country. He found Moscow large (much larger than London) and primitively built, almost all being made out of wood only. However, the palace of the Tsar was very luxurious, as were the dinners he offered Chancellor. The Russian Tsar was pleased to open the sea trade routes with England and other countries, as Russia did not yet have a safe connection with the Baltic Sea at the time and almost all of the area was contested by the neighbouring powers of Lithuania, Poland, and Sweden. In addition, the Hanseatic League had a monopoly on the trade between Russia and Central and Western Europe. Chancellor was no less optimistic, finding a good market for his English wool, and receiving furs and other Russian continental goods in return. When he returned to England in 1554, he had letters from the Tsar with him, inviting English traders and promising trade privileges.

=== Chartering of the Muscovy Company ===
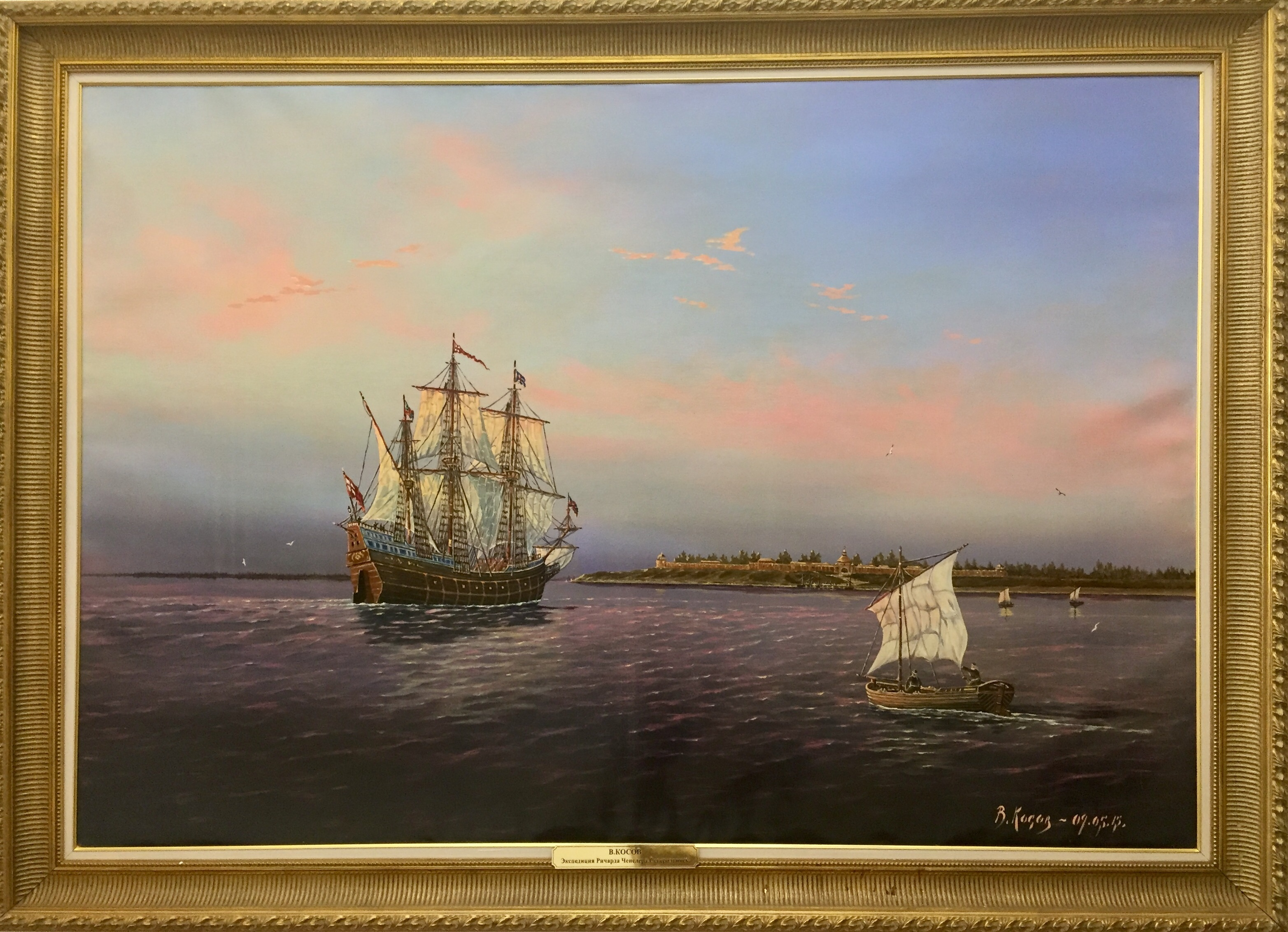
Vladimir Kosov. 1553 expedition of Richard Chancellor

The Company of Merchant Adventurers to New Lands was rechartered as the Muscovy Company by Mary I of England in 1555, and in the same year Chancellor left for Russia again. The Muscovy Company became an important diplomatic link between Muscovy and England, and was especially valued by the isolated Muscovy. Upon his arrival to the court of Ivan IV, Chancellor secured a number of privileges within Russia for the company, including free passage, control of English settlement, and freedom from arrest.

When Chancellor set sail for England one year later in 1556, he was joined by the first Russian ambassador to England, Osip Nepeya. However at this juncture Chancellor's luck finally ran out. Off the Scottish coast, his ship was caught in a sudden storm and shipwrecked. Chancellor drowned, but Nepeya managed to reach the coast, where he was taken hostage by the Scots for a few months before they allowed him to travel on to London.

=== Trade through Russia ===
Anthony Jenkinson succeeded Chancellor as the main trader of the Muscovy Company. Jenkinson made two important voyages himself — one trying to reach Cathay overland from Moscow, eventually stopping at Bukhara; the other, between 1562 and 1579 to establish overland trade routes through Russia to Persia. Although Jenkinson verified that the overland route to Persia was a viable one, it was abandoned in 1573 due to difficulties in the region; the route did not reopen until Parliament reinstated the company's right to the route in 1741. In 1567, when Muscovy was faring badly in the Livonian War (1558–1583), Tsar Ivan IV asked Jenkinson to sound out Queen Elizabeth I of England as a marriage prospect, providing a possible refuge for him if he was forced to flee the country. The negotiations yielded no results, and Ivan IV was soon forced to sign a ceasefire (1570) with the Polish–Lithuanian Commonwealth.

In 1571, the company's right to free trade and navigation down the Volga was revoked by Ivan IV, who had been offended by English demands to close Russian trade to other European nations. Jenkinson returned to Moscow in 1572 in an attempt to restore the company's privileges, a task at which he was largely successful. However, a cooling of Anglo-Russian relations was evident. This unease between the Muscovy Company and Russia continued to the end of the sixteenth century, under the anti-English dominated courts of Fyodor Ivanovich and Boris Godunov.

At the end of the 16th century, Richard Hakluyt wrote: "... the notable and strange journey of Master Jenkinson to Boghar in Bactria. Whereunto thou maist adde sixe of our voyages eleven hundred verstes up against the streame of Dwina to the towne of Vologhda thence one hundred and fourescore verstes by land to Yeraslaue standing upon the mighty river of Volga: there hence above two thousand and five hundred versts downe the streame to the ancient marte Towne of Astracan, and so to the manifolde mouthes of Volga, and from thence also by ship over the Caspian sea into Media, and further then that also with Camels unto Georgia, Armenia, Hyrcania, Gillan, and the cheefest Cities of the Empire of Persia: wherein the Companie of Moscovie Marchants to the perpetual honor of their Citie, and societie, have performed more than any one, yea than all the nations of Europe besides."

=== Expansion ===
Queen Elizabeth I granted the Muscovy Company a monopoly charter on whaling in 1577. The primary and most profitable whaling grounds of this joint-stock company came to be centered around Spitsbergen in the early 17th century, and the company's royal charter of 1613 granted a monopoly on whaling in Spitsbergen, based on the (erroneous) claim that Hugh Willoughby had discovered the land in 1553. Initially the English tried to drive away competitors, but after a few years, they claimed rights only to the waters south of these Arctic islands.

Shortly after Chancellor's death in 1556, the Muscovy Company sent another voyage to discover the Northeast Passage, this time led by Steven Borough. He managed to sail through the Kara Gates, the strait between the islands of Vaygach and Novaya Zemlya in the Arctic Ocean. In 1607 and 1608, the company sent Henry Hudson in two separate voyages in an attempt to find the Northeast Passage. Both voyages were unsuccessful.

=== Decline ===
In 1646, Tsar Alexei I rescinded the exemption of the Muscovy Company from Russian customs, in response to the company's alleged support of the Parliamentarians in the English Civil War. After the execution of Charles I of England in 1648, Alexei I expelled English merchants from Russia altogether, except from Arkhangelsk. While the restoration of Charles II of England in 1660 resulted in a temporary thaw of relations between England and Russia, a 1664 embassy under Andrew Marvell proved unsuccessful in restoring the Muscovy Company's prior benefits. In the meantime, Dutch merchants replaced the English as the dominant traders in Russia. Nevertheless, the company held a monopoly on English-Russian trade until 1698, when it lost its privileges due to political opposition.

=== 18th century on ===
The Company helped provide churches and Anglican ministers at various times in Arkhangelsk, Moscow, St. Petersburg, and Kronstadt, such as St. Andrew's Anglican Church, Moscow. The Company continued in existence until the Russian Revolution of 1917 and has since operated mainly as a charity.

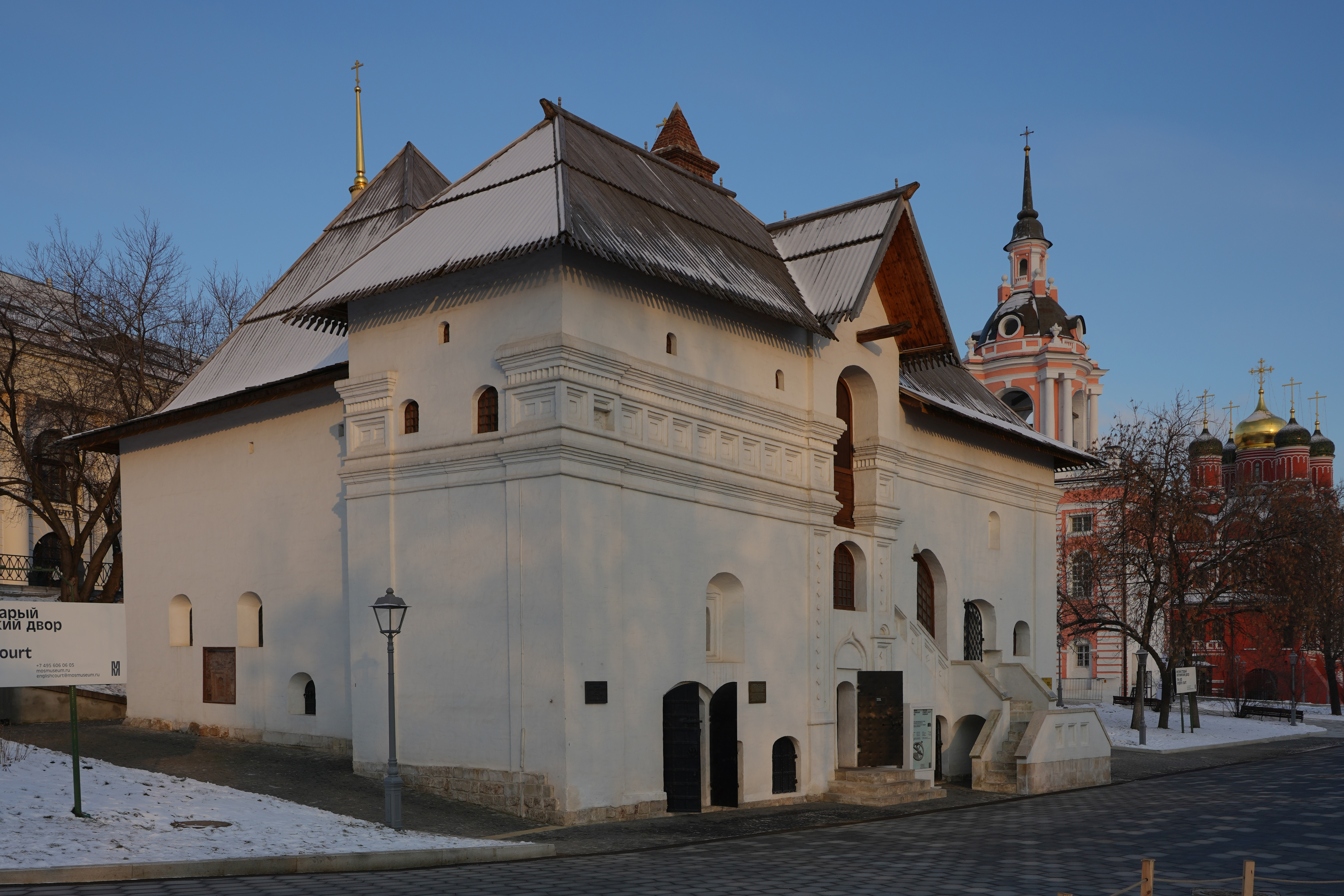
'The Old English Yard,' the house in Varvarka street, Moscow, where English ambassadors and merchants were allowed to reside

St. Andrew's Church and the company headquarters (called the Old English Yard), were built during the reign of Ivan IV, and are not far from the Moscow Kremlin. In October 1994 they were visited by Queen Elizabeth II (State visit by Elizabeth II to Russia during the presidency of Boris Yeltsin. The visit marked a crucial time in Russia's history after the Dissolution of the Soviet Union.

== In popular culture ==
- Richard Chancellor's 1555 voyage to Moscow, and the return to Scotland and London are portrayed in Dorothy Dunnett's 1971 novel The Ringed Castle.

== See also ==
- List of trading companies

== Sources ==
- Coates, Ben (2004). The Impact of the English Civil War on the Economy of London: 1642 - 50. Ashgate Publishing. ISBN 9780754601043.
- Dmitrieva, Ol'ga (2006). Britannia and Muscovy. Yale University Press. ISBN 0300116780.
- Eddy, Anna (2007). English in the Russian Context: A Macrosociolinguistic Study. ISBN 9780549321606.
- Gerson, Armand (1912). Studies in the History of English Commerce in the Tudor Period. University of Pennsylvania.
- Olson, James (1996). Historical Dictionary of the British Empire: K-Z. Greenwood Publishing Group. ISBN 9780313279171.
- T. S. Willan, The Early History of the Russia Company, 1956, reprinted in 1968.
- Jürgen Klein, "'Eastward Ho! Hakluyt's Principal Navigations on English 16th Century Seafarers in the Baltic and Eastern Europe", in: Zeitsprünge. Forschungen zur Frühen Neuzeit 10 (2006), Heft 3 - 4, pp. 400 - 423.
