= Stephen Borough =

English navigator and Arctic explorer (1525–1584)

Steven Borough (25 September 1525 – 12 July 1584) was an English navigator and an early Arctic explorer. He was master of the first English ship to reach the White Sea in 1553 and open trade with Russia on behalf of the Muscovy Company. He became an expert on piloting in Arctic waters and was one of the earliest English practitioners of the new scientific methods of navigation. He was widely sought out for his knowledge by English and Spanish mariners.

== Life ==
Borough was born on 25 September 1525 at Northam, north Devon, the son of Walter and Mary (Dough) Borough. After some basic education at the local parish school, he was apprenticed to his uncle, John Borough, an accomplished mariner who sailed regularly to Sicily, Crete, and the Levant. In addition to learning navigational and pilotage skills from his uncle, Borough gained some ability with Spanish and Portuguese languages.

With some help from his uncle's connections in London, Borough was selected to take part in an expedition that was chartered by the Company of Merchant Adventurers to New Lands to look for a north-eastern passage to Cathay. Three vessels left London in 1553 under the leadership of Sir Hugh Willoughby. Borough served as master of the Edward Bonaventure, on which Richard Chancellor sailed as the expedition's chief pilot and second-in-command. Separated by a storm from the other two ships of the expedition (the Bona Esperanza and the Bona Confidentia), the Edward proceeded alone to the White Sea where they dropped anchor at the mouth of the Dvina River near present-day Arkhangelsk. Chancellor traveled overland to Moscow where he negotiated a trade treaty with Ivan the Terrible while Borough and most of the crew spent the winter with their ship.

On a second expedition in 1556 Borough sailed beyond the White Sea in the Serchthrift, a small vessel with a crew of 15. He discovered the Kara Strait between Novaya Zemlya and Vaygach Island but was unable to proceed further because ice blocked the passage. Borough returned to the White Sea and wintered at Kholmogory. During this expedition he also collected a list of 95 Kildin Sami words and expressions in 1557, which is the earliest known documentation of Sami languages; the document was published by Richard Hakluyt in 1589.

Upon his return to England in 1557, Borough learned that Chancellor had been killed in a shipwreck on the Scottish coast and he was promoted to chief navigator for the Muscovy Company. He made several more trips to Russia between 1560 and 1571.

In 1558 he visited the navigational school in Seville where he shared his knowledge of the Arctic in exchange for insights into the training of Spanish pilots. He also brought back to England a copy of Martín Cortés de Albacar's Breve Compendio, a handbook on navigation. Borough had the book translated by Richard Eden and published as the Art of Navigation in 1561. As such it became the first English manual of navigation and was widely used for many years.

In 1563 he was appointed chief pilot and one of the four masters of the royal ships on the Medway in Kent. In 1574 he conferred with Martin Frobisher and Michael Lok about their expeditions in search of a north-west passage to Cathay.

He died on 12 July 1584, and was buried at Chatham.

== Family ==
His son, Christopher Borough, wrote a description of a trading expedition made in 1579-1581 from the White Sea to the Caspian Sea and back.

His younger brother, William Borough, born in 1536, also at Northam, accompanied Sir Francis Drake in his Cádiz expedition of 1587.

== Sources ==
- This article incorporates text from a publication now in the public domain: Coote, Charles Henry (1886). "Borough, Stephen". In Stephen, Leslie (ed.). Dictionary of National Biography. Vol. 5. London: Smith, Elder & Co.
- Abercromby, John (1895). "The earliest list of Russian Lapp words" (PDF). Suomalais-Ugrilaisen Seuran Aikakauskirja. 13 (2): 1–8.
- Baldwin, R. C. D. (2004). "Borough, Stephen (1525–1584)". Oxford Dictionary of National Biography. Oxford University Press.
- Evans, James (2014). Tudor Adventurers: An Arctic Voyage of Discovery. New York: Pegasus Books.
- Mayers, Kit (2005). North-East Passage to Muscovy. Sutton Publishing.
- Wright, Helen Saunders (1910). The great white North: the story of polar exploration from the earliest times to the discovery of the Pole. The Macmillan Co. pp. 7. "helen wright great white north."
- "Stephen Borough". Encyclopedia of World Biography. Gale. 2009.
