= Christopher Borough =

English adventurer, navigator and translator

- Other names: Christopher Burrough
- Occupations: adventurer, navigator, translator
- Known for: voyage to Persia and accounts published by Richard Hakluyt

Christopher Borough or Christopher Burrough (fl. 1579–1587), son of Steven Borough, was an English adventurer, navigator and translator and the chronicler of one of the most interesting journeys into Persia recorded in the pages of Richard Hakluyt. He was fluent in Russian.

== Biography ==
As part of the Muscovy Company, he left Gravesend on 19 June 1579. The fleet, having arrived at St. Nicholas in the White Sea on 22 July, descended the Northern Dvina to Vologda. Proceeding thence overland to the left bank of the Volga, they once more reshipped in three barks at Yaroslaw on 14 September, terminating the first portion of their voyage down the Volga at Astrakhan on 16 October 1579, where they wintered.

Borough and his party, leaving Arthur Edwards, the chief agent, in charge at Astrakhan, embarked on 1 May 1580 on board an English-built bark for Persia. After having cleared the intricate navigation of the mouths of the Volga, but not without damage and loss, they made for Derbent or some convenient port near it. Owing, however, to adverse winds, they were carried as far south as the Apsheron Peninsula, where they anchored off Bildh (Biala). Here they were entertained by the captain or governor of Baku, who directed them to make once more for Derbent, the chief emporium for traffic in those parts. Here they traded for silk and other goods from 22 June to 3 October.

Borough's descriptions of Derbent and the neighbourhood of the ancient city of the fire-worshippers, Baku, are most interesting, as showing, on the one hand, the growth of the Turkish power, and, on the other, the decadence of the Persian power on the then little-known shores of the Caspian Sea. Borough's thorough nautical training, received at the hands of both his father and uncle, is shown in the series of carefully made observations for latitude which are to be found in his narrative, and which are probably the earliest made with any degree of accuracy for these parts. After plying on and off the coast between Derbent and Baku to pick up stragglers, including two Spaniards who had fled from the Goletta near Tunis, Borough's party returned to Astrakhan after many perils at sea on 4 December 1580, where they once more wintered. On the return of the open weather in April 1581, the traders to Persia set out on their homeward journey, and arrived at Rose Island, near St. Nicholas, on 16 July. The ship (William and John), laden with proceeds of the Persian voyage, shortly afterwards sailed for England, and arrived in the Thames on 25 September 1581.

Borough's account of this journey was entitled Aduertisements and reports of the 6th voyage into the parts of Persia and Media for the Company of Merchants for the discouerie of new trades, in the yeares 1579, 80, and 81, gathered out of sundrie letters written by Christopher Burrough, servant to the saide companie, and sent to his uncle, Master William Burrough. From another series of observations for latitude appended to the advertisements, made between July and November 1581, it would appear that Borough did not return to England with the fleet in that year, but found employment in visiting the English houses between Archangel and Astrakhan, where many of the observations were made.

In November 1587, Borough addressed a letter to the governors of the Muscovy Company upon their affairs in Russia; this document, probably on account of its great length, has not yet received the attention it deserves. Among other things, it seems to expose in the strongest possible way the devious policy of Sir Jerome Horsey and his harsh treatment of J. Peacock and other agents sent out by the company in 1585. In this letter is a discussion of the decay and improvement of the Russia trade.
