= Khaypudyr Bay =

Bay of the Pechora Sea, Russia

Coordinates: 68.5°N 59.5°E

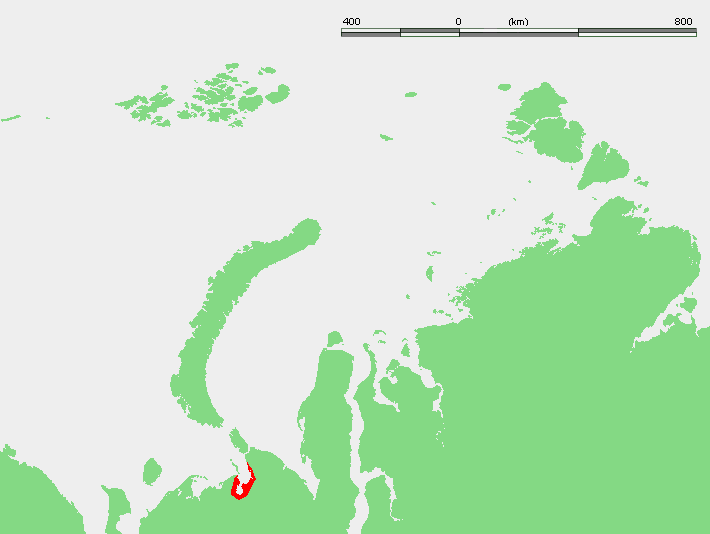
Location of Khaypudyr Bay in the Pechora Sea.

Khaypudyr Bay or Khaypudyrskaya Bay (Russian: Хайпудырская губа) is a gulf in Russia, located in the Pechora Sea (Southeastern Barents Sea) between the coastline of the Yugorsky Peninsula and the lowlands and marshy areas in the mainland south of Dolgiy Island. Its latitude is 68° 30' N and the longitude 59° 30' E.

The Khaypudyr Bay has a smaller bay within a larger one. The length of the wider gulf is approximately of 80 km, mouth width - 60 km. The smaller inner bay is often considered to be the Khaypudyr Bay proper. Its shape is rounder and it is located on the southwest shore of the larger one. Its length is 33 km and the width of its northward-facing mouth is 15 km. Its waters are very shallow, with an average depth between 1 and 2 m only.

The surface water temperature is 7C during summertime. The gulf freezes up during winter. The rivers Naulyakha, Talotayakha, Moreyu and Korotaikha flow into the Khaypudyr Bay.

This bay and its surroundings belong to the Nenets Autonomous Okrug administrative region of the Russian Federation, which is an autonomous okrug of Arkhangelsk Oblast.
