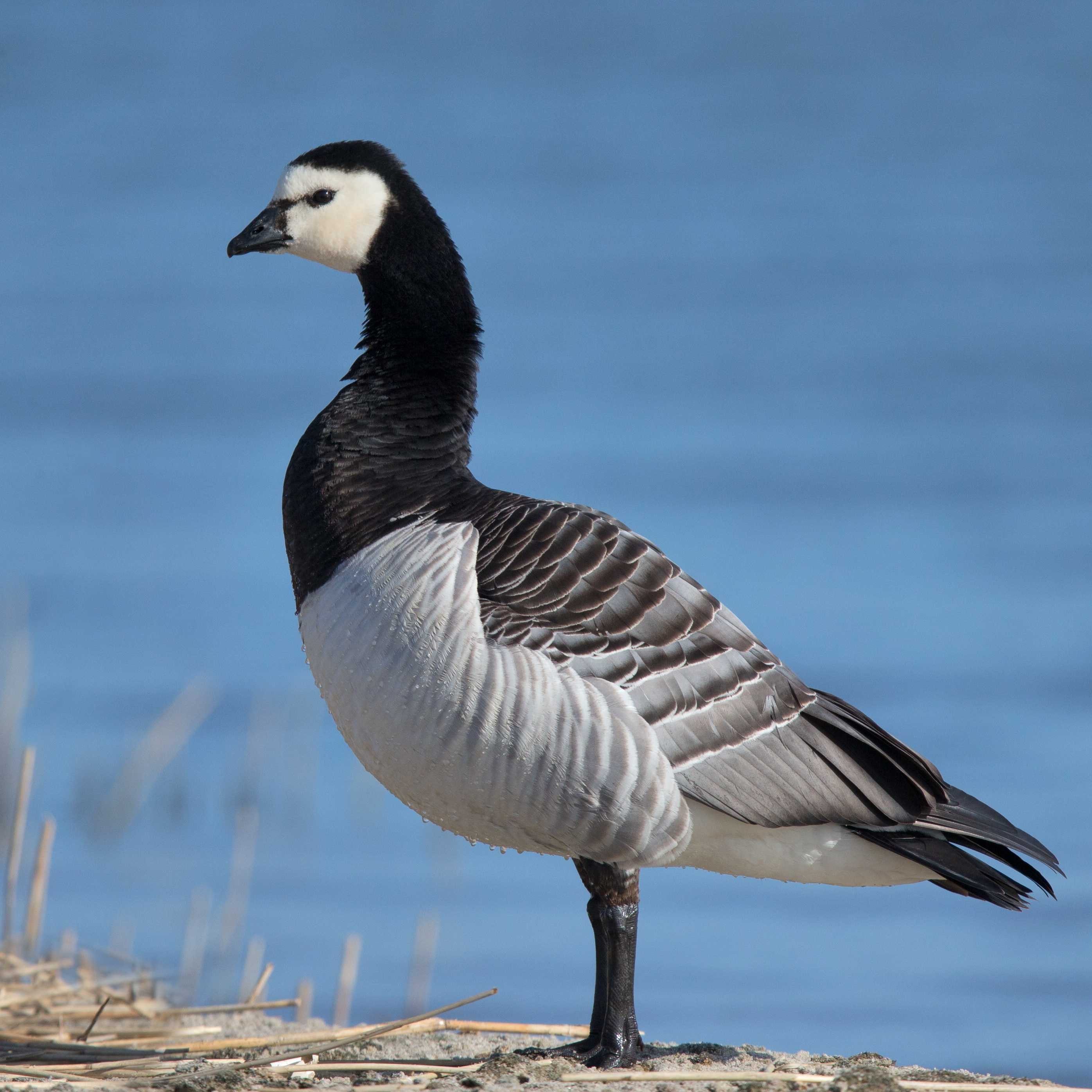

Conservation status
- Least Concern (IUCN 3.1)

Scientific classification
- Kingdom: Animalia
- Phylum: Chordata
- Class: Aves
- Order: Anseriformes
- Family: Anatidae
- Genus: Branta
- Species: B. leucopsis

Binomial name
- Branta leucopsis (Bechstein, 1803)
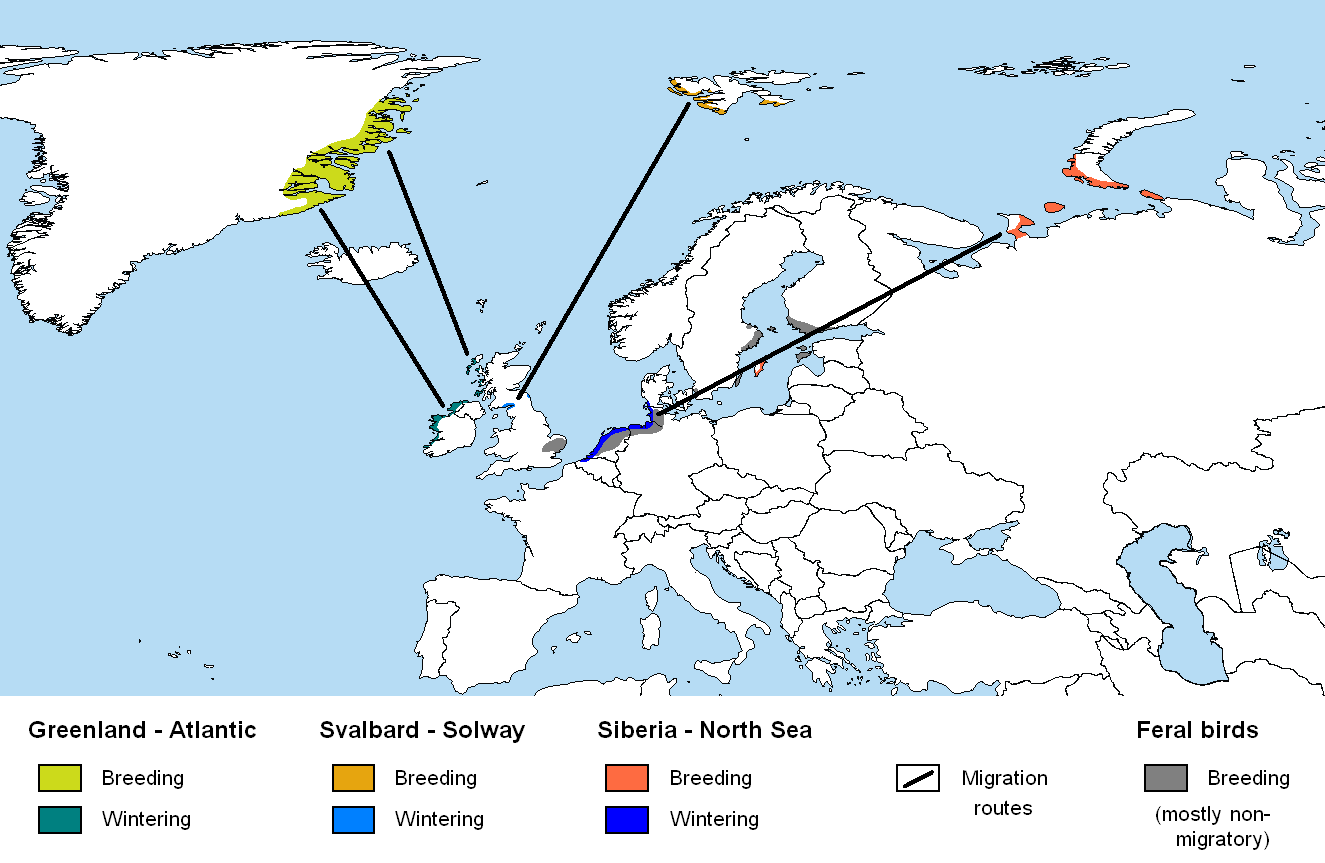
- Range of the barnacle goose (note: also breeds in Iceland; grey is indicated as feral, but these populations were established by both wild birds and escaped captives, see text)

= Barnacle goose =

Species of bird

The barnacle goose (Branta leucopsis) is a species of goose that belongs to the genus Branta of black geese, which contains species with extensive black in the plumage, distinguishing them from the grey Anser species. Despite its superficial similarity to the brant goose, genetic analysis has shown its closest relative is the cackling goose.

== Taxonomy and naming ==
The barnacle goose was first classified taxonomically by Johann Matthäus Bechstein in 1803. Branta is a Latinised form of Old Norse Brandgás, "burnt [black] goose" and the specific epithet is from the Ancient Greek leukos "white", and opsis "faced".

In the mediaeval period, the barnacle goose and the similar brant goose were not distinguished, and were formerly believed to spawn from the goose barnacle. This gave rise to the English name of the barnacle goose and the scientific name of the brant. The barnacle myth can be dated back to at least the 12th century. Gerald of Wales claimed to have seen these birds hanging down from pieces of timber, William Turner accepted the theory, and John Gerard claimed to have seen the birds emerging from their shells. The legend persisted until the end of the 18th century. In County Kerry, until relatively recently, Catholics abstaining from meat during Lent could still eat this bird because it was considered as fish. It is sometimes claimed that the word comes from a Celtic word for "limpet", but the sense-history seems to go in the opposite direction.

== Distribution and population size ==
The three original populations of barnacle geese have separate breeding and wintering ranges. Since the 1960s, two new breeding populations have established themselves, both located along migration routes of two of the original populations. The five populations are:

- Breeding in eastern Greenland, wintering on the Hebrides of western Scotland and in western Ireland. Population increased from about 7,000 individuals in the 1960s to 44,000 in 2011.
- A recently established population, derived from the Greenland population, has bred more-or-less regularly in Iceland since 1964. The population has rapidly increased in the last few decades, with more than 4000 breeding pairs in 2024. They winter in the same area as Greenland population.
- Breeding on Svalbard, Norway, and wintering almost entirely in Solway Firth on the England/Scotland border, with small numbers elsewhere in the region, particularly around Budle Bay in Northumberland. This population increased from a few hundred individuals in the 1940s to about 34,000 in 2004, and 40,000 by the start of the 2020s.
- Breeding on Novaya Zemlya, Dolgy Island, Kanin Peninsula, Yugorsky Peninsula and the Barents Sea coastline in the Russian Arctic, wintering in the Wadden Sea area in southwest Denmark, northwest Germany and the Netherlands. Increased from about 70,000 individuals in 1980 to 1.2 million individuals in 2015.
- A recent population, derived from the Russian population along with escaped captive birds, has become established since 1971; breeding on islands in the Baltic Sea, and on islands and coasts of the southern North Sea (Estonia, Finland, Sweden, Denmark, the Netherlands, Germany and Belgium). Winters in or near breeding range or moves to the Wadden Sea. Some exchange with Russian population continues. Rapidly increasing; the Danish, Dutch and Swedish populations each contain several thousand breeding pairs, and the Belgian, Estonian, Finnish and German populations each contain several hundred breeding pairs.

The species has been recorded as a vagrant in eastern Canada, the Northeastern United States and India; care must be taken to distinguish these wild birds from escaped individuals, as barnacle geese are popular waterfowl with collectors.

== Description ==
The barnacle goose is a medium-sized goose, 55–70 cm (22–28 in) long, with a wingspan of 120–145 cm (47–57 in) and a weight of 1.21–2.23 kg (2.7–4.9 lb), with black legs and a small, stubby black bill.

It has a white face and black head, neck, and upper breast. Its belly is white. The wings and its back are silver-grey with black-and-white bars that look like they are shining when the light reflects on it. During flight, a V-shaped white rump patch and the silver-grey underwing linings are visible. They look similar to cackling geese but have grey and white instead of brown bodies, and more extensive white on the head; from Canada geese they are additionally distinguished by being smaller, and having smaller beaks. The juveniles are similar to the adults, but like with all geese, can be distinguished by the rounded rather than square-ended mantle and flank feathers.

A rare leucistic form exists, which is characterised by white plumage, with black eyes, beak, and legs. This morph has been reported in the Svalbard/Solway Firth population.

== Ecology, behaviour, and life history ==
Barnacle geese nest either on small islands, or high on mountain cliffs at heights of up to 200–300 m above the surrounding terrain, where they are safer from predators (primarily Arctic foxes and polar bears), but also up to a kilometre away from their feeding areas in lakes and rivers. Like all geese, the goslings are not fed by the adults; instead of bringing food to the newly hatched goslings, the goslings follow the parents in their first day of life to good feeding areas. Unable to fly, the goslings jump off the cliff and fall; their small size, feathery down, and very light weight normally protects them from injury when they hit the rocks below, but some may die from the impact. Arctic foxes are attracted by the noise made by the parent geese during this time, so capture any dead or injured goslings. The foxes also stalk the young as they are led by the parents to wetland feeding areas. Due to these hardships only 50% of the chicks survive the first month.

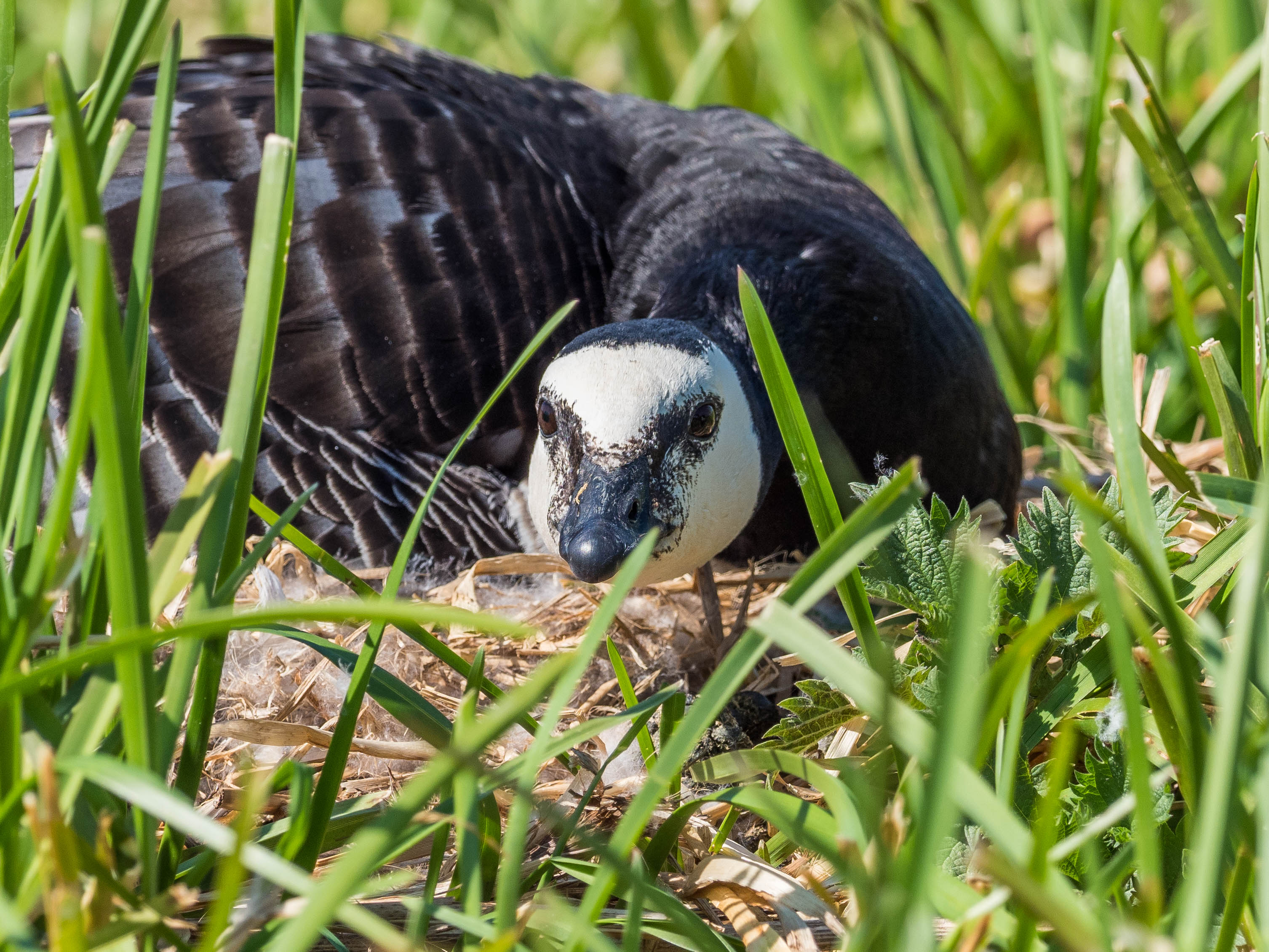
Brooding in Sweden

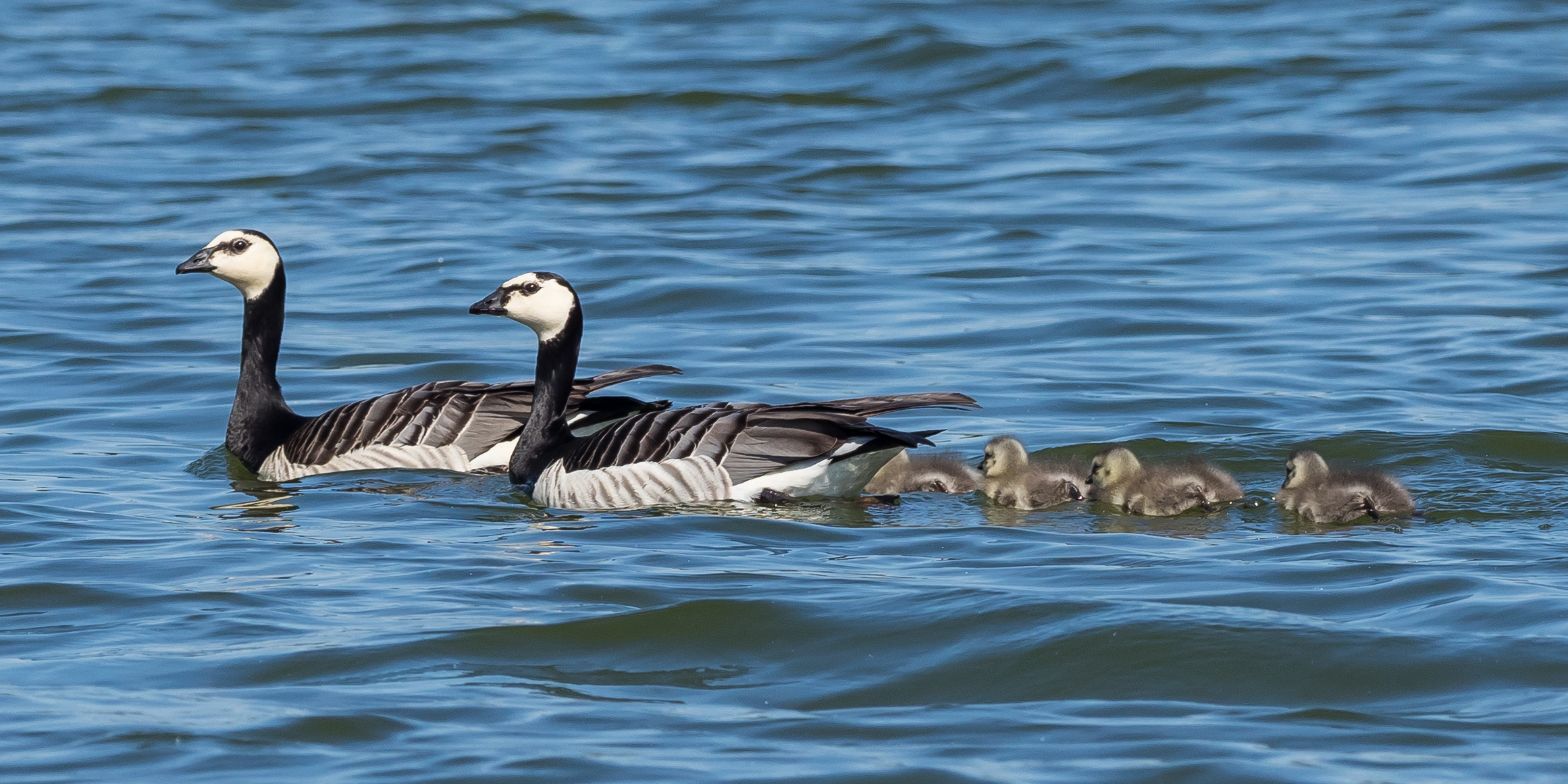
Pair with goslings in Sweden

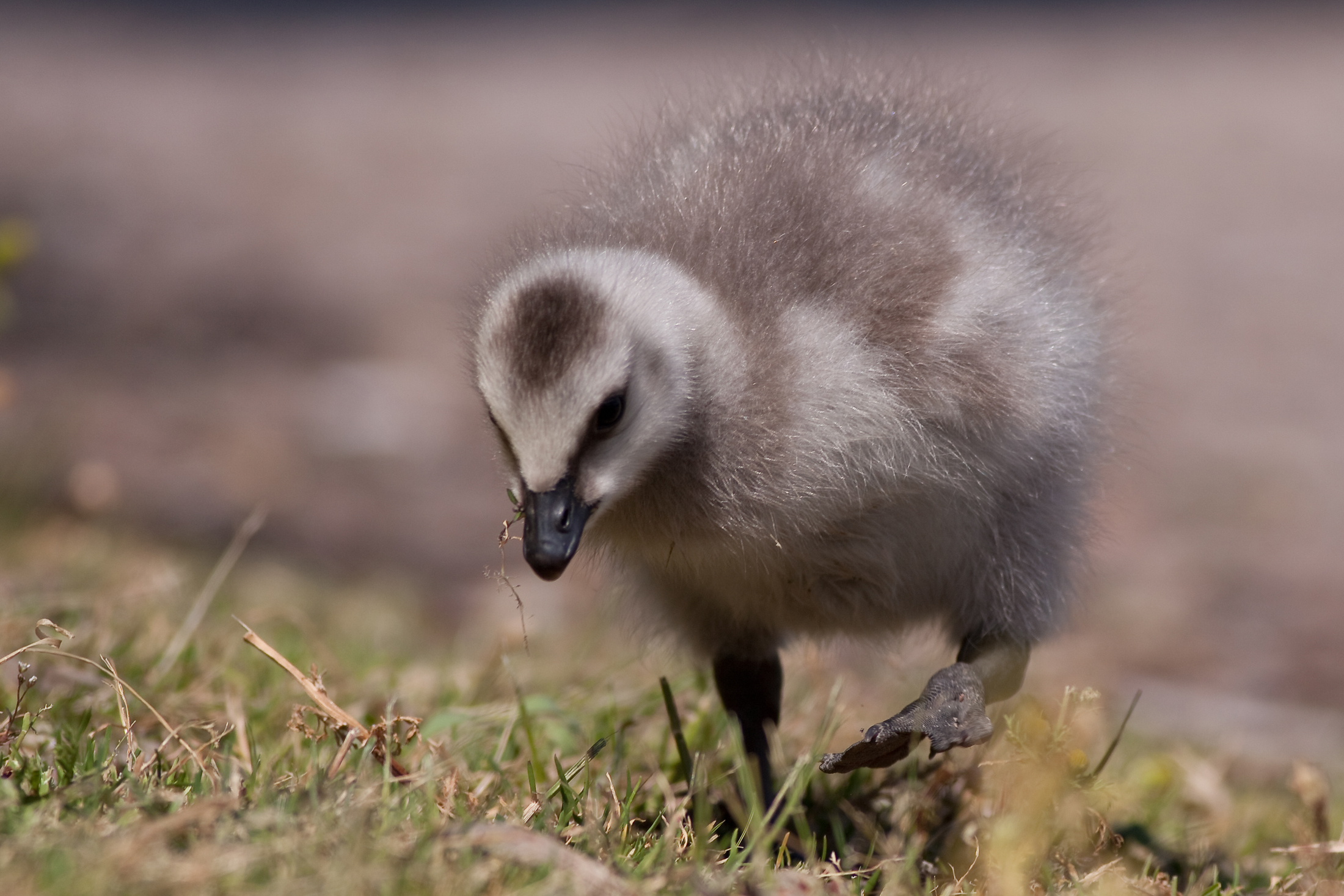
Half-grown gosling

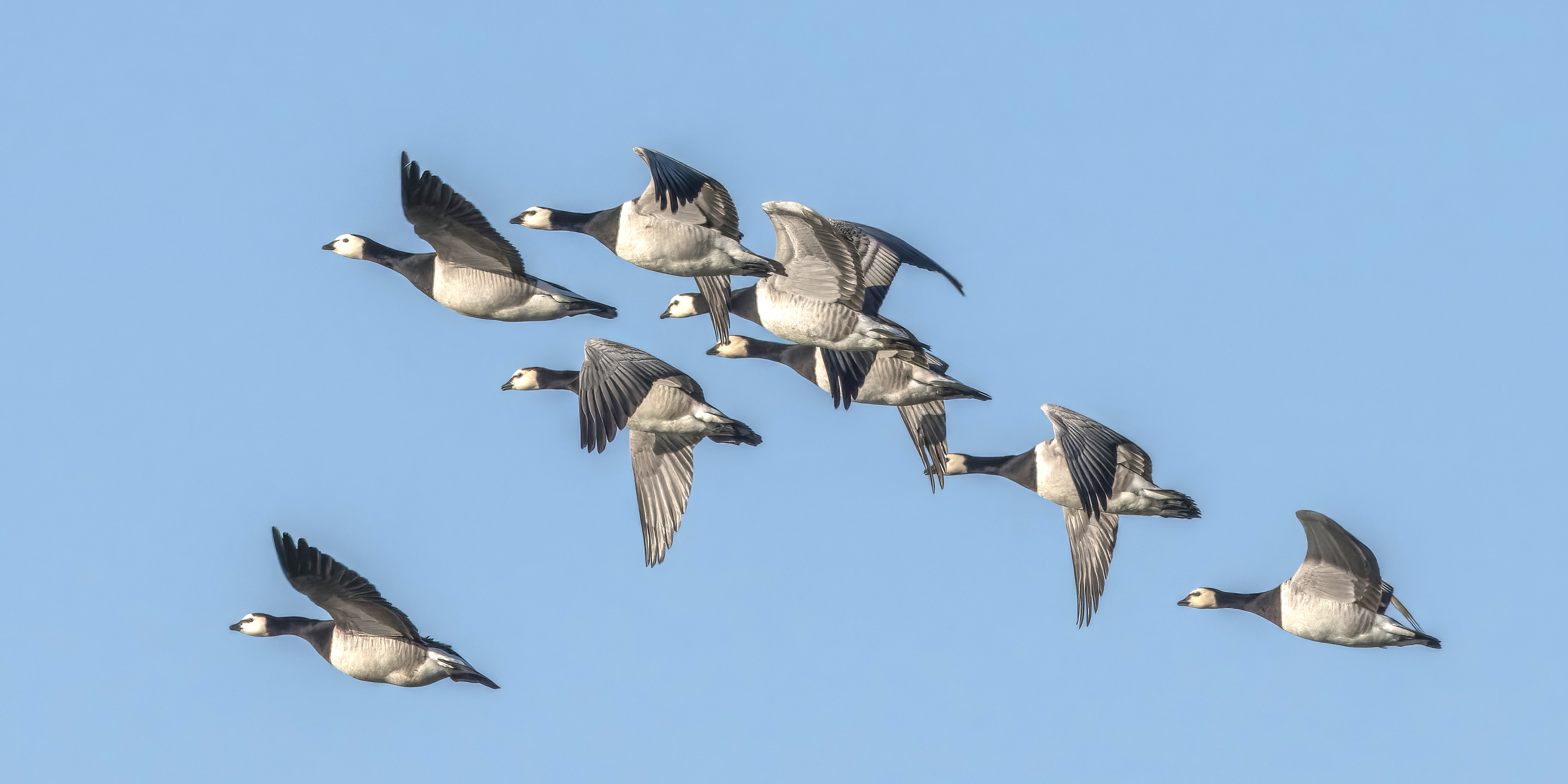
In flight, Netherlands

== Conservation ==
The barnacle goose is common and widespread, and its population and breeding range have increased in recent decades. The barnacle goose is one of the species to which the Agreement on the Conservation of African-Eurasian Migratory Waterbirds applies.

The Svalbard population was heavily reduced by the early 2020s highly pathogenic avian influenza (HPAI) outbreak, with mass mortality involving 11,400 killed in the 2021/22 winter, or about 31% of the population. The two subsequent breeding seasons were however highly productive, allowing the population to recover to close to its former levels by the 2023/24 winter.

== Folklore ==
The natural history of the barnacle goose was long surrounded with a legend claiming that they were born of driftwood:

Nature produces [Bernacae] against Nature in the most extraordinary way. They are like marsh geese but somewhat smaller. They are produced from fir timber tossed along the sea, and are at first like gum. Afterwards they hang down by their beaks as if they were a seaweed attached to the timber, and are surrounded by shells in order to grow more freely. Having thus in process of time been clothed with a strong coat of feathers, they either fall into the water or fly freely away into the air. They derived their food and growth from the sap of the wood or from the sea, by a secret and most wonderful process of alimentation. I have frequently seen, with my own eyes, more than a thousand of these small bodies of birds, hanging down on the sea-shore from one piece of timber, enclosed in their shells, and already formed. They do not breed and lay eggs like other birds, nor do they ever hatch any eggs, nor do they seem to build nests in any corner of the earth.

The legend was widely repeated in, for example, Vincent of Beauvais's great encyclopedia. However, it was also criticized by other medieval authors, including Albertus Magnus.

This belief may be related to the fact that these geese were never seen in summer, when they were supposedly developing underwater (they were actually breeding in remote Arctic regions) in the form of barnacles—which came to have the name "barnacle" because of this legend.

Based on these legends—indeed, the legends may have been invented for this purpose—some Irish clerics considered barnacle goose flesh to be acceptable fast day food, a practice that was criticized by Giraldus Cambrensis, a Welsh author:

...Bishops and religious men (viri religiosi) in some parts of Ireland do not scruple to dine off these birds at the time of fasting, because they are not flesh nor born of flesh... But in so doing they are led into sin. For if anyone were to eat of the leg of our first parent (Adam) although he was not born of flesh, that person could not be adjudged innocent of eating meat.

At the Fourth Council of the Lateran (1215), Pope Innocent III explicitly prohibited the eating of these geese during Lent, arguing that despite their unusual reproduction, they lived and fed like ducks and so were of the same nature as other birds.

The question of the nature of barnacle geese also came up as a matter of Jewish dietary law in the Halakha, and Rabbeinu Tam (1100–71) determined that they were kosher (even if born of trees) and should be slaughtered following the normal prescriptions for birds.

In one Jewish legend, the barnacle goose is purported to have its beak forever attached to the tree from which it grew just as the Adne Sadeh is fixed to the earth by its navel cord. The mythical barnacle tree, believed in the Middle Ages to have barnacles that opened to reveal geese, may have a similar origin to the other legends already mentioned.

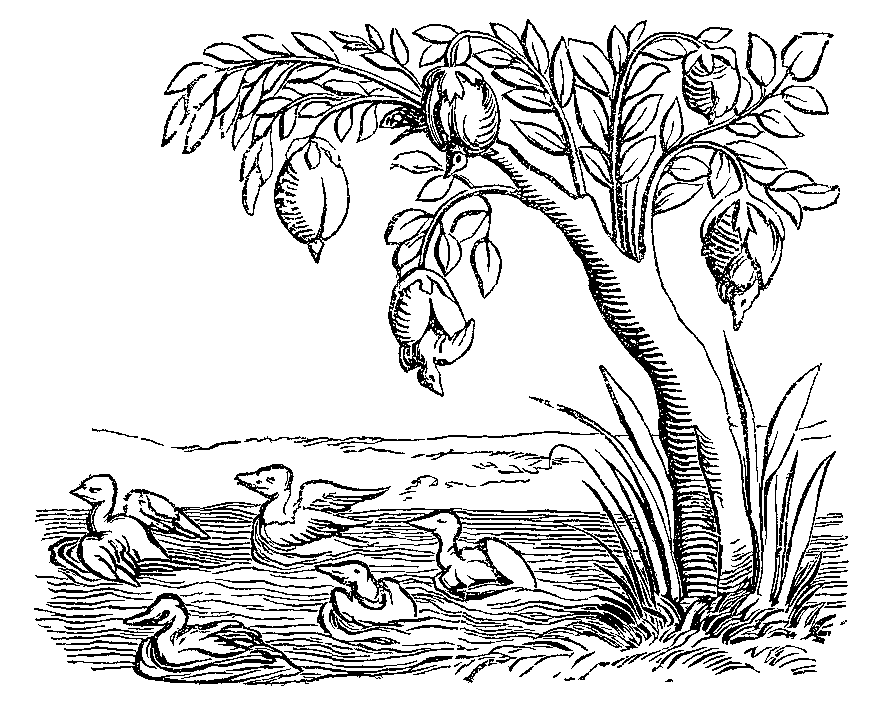
Goose barnacles turning into barnacle geese in Sebastian Münster's 1552 Cosmographia

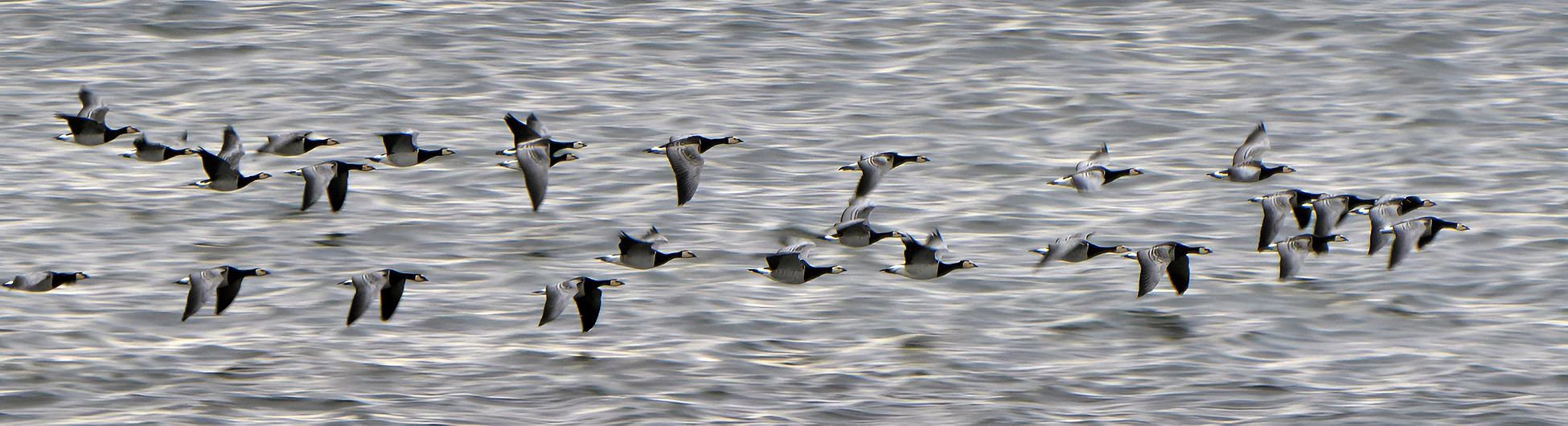
Autumn migration in Sweden

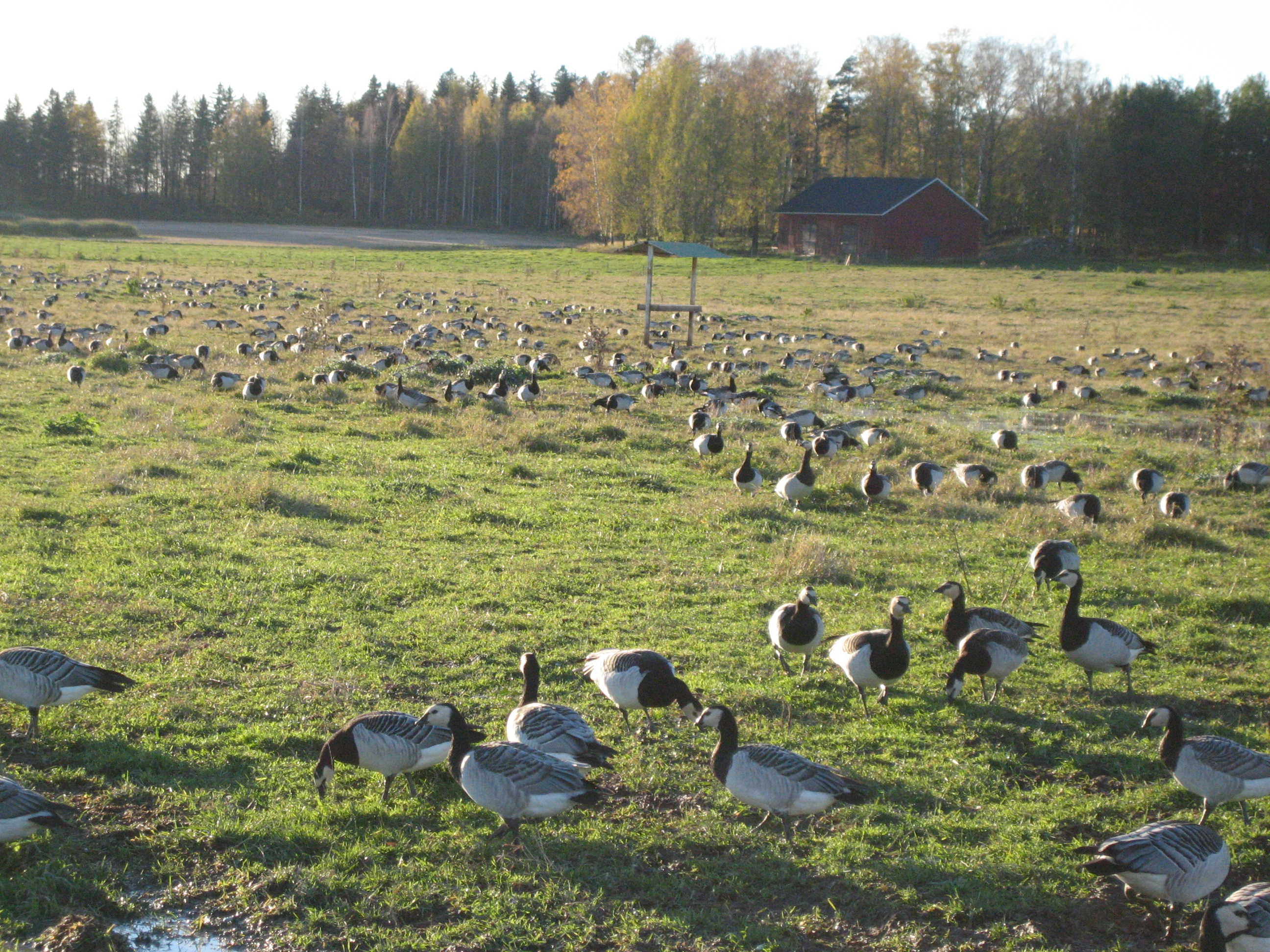
A flock feeding at Helsinki, Finland

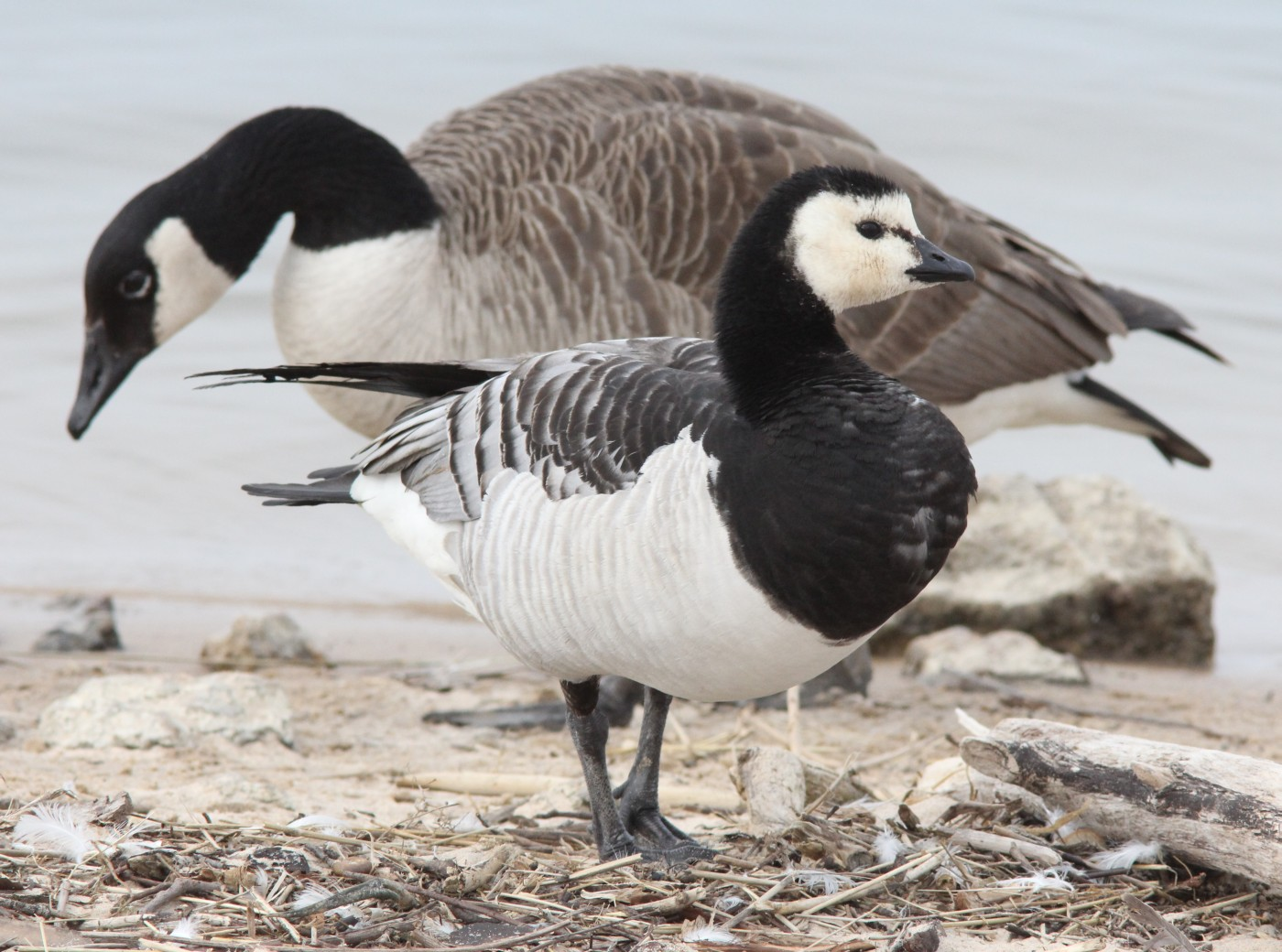
Captive barnacle goose in a zoo compared to a Canada goose
