= Yugorsky Strait =

Narrow sound between the Kara Sea and the Pechora Sea

Coordinates: 69°45′N 60°30′E

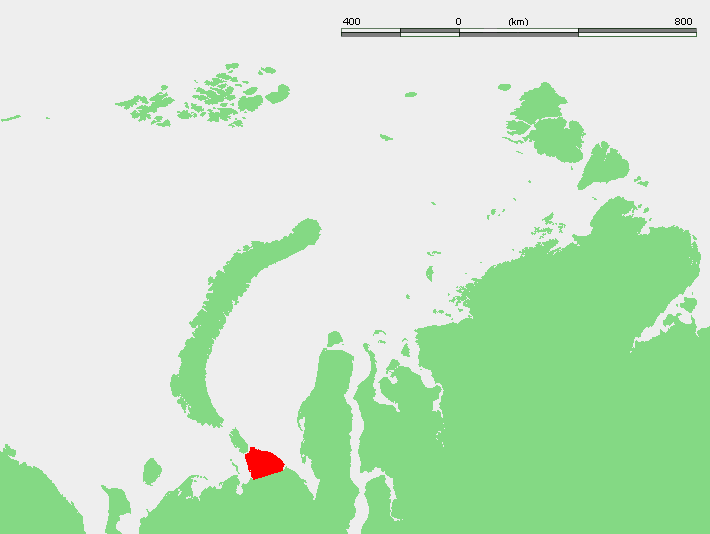
Location of the Yugorsky Peninsula. The Yugorsky Strait is on its northwestern end.

The Yugorsky Strait or Yugor Strait (Russian: Югорский Шар, or Yugorsky Shar) is a narrow sound between the Kara Sea and the Pechora Sea. Its maximum width is 10 km and its minimum width only 3 km.

Ostrov Storozhevoy, an island 1.6 km in length, lies in the middle of the strait.

This sound separates Vaygach Island from the Yugorsky Peninsula on the Russian mainland.

The name is derived from Yugaria, an old name for the region to the south of Yugorsky Strait.

== History ==
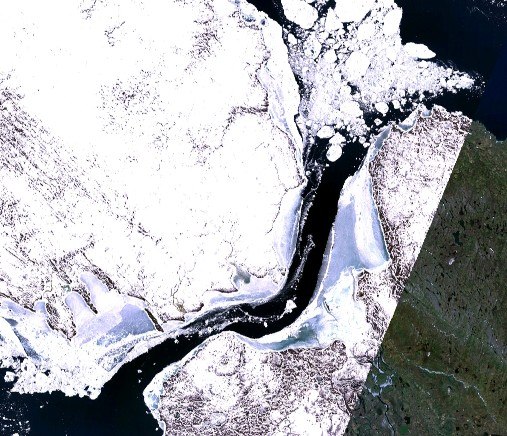
Yugorsky Shar Strait, situated between Vaigach Island and Eurasia, separates the Barents and Kara Seas

The earliest recorded voyage through the Yugorsky Shar, traditionally known as the Arctic "Iron Gateway", into the Kara Sea was made from Nizhny Novgorod by early Russian explorer Uleb in 1032.

Russian Pomors, the coastal dwellers of the White Sea shores, had been exploring this strait since the 11th century.

The Arctic's first shipping line, the Great Mangazea Route, from the White Sea to the Ob River and the Yenisei Gulf began operating in the latter part of the 16th century. This line opened up the way to Siberia's riches and worked until 1619, when it was closed for military and political reasons, for fear of possible penetration by Europeans into Siberia.

The Yugorsky Strait was an important waterway in the early exploration of the Northern Sea Route and for the traffic of Soviet maritime convoys during World War II.

== See also ==
- Operation Wunderland
