= Lake Yonozero =

Lake in Murmansk Oblast, Russia

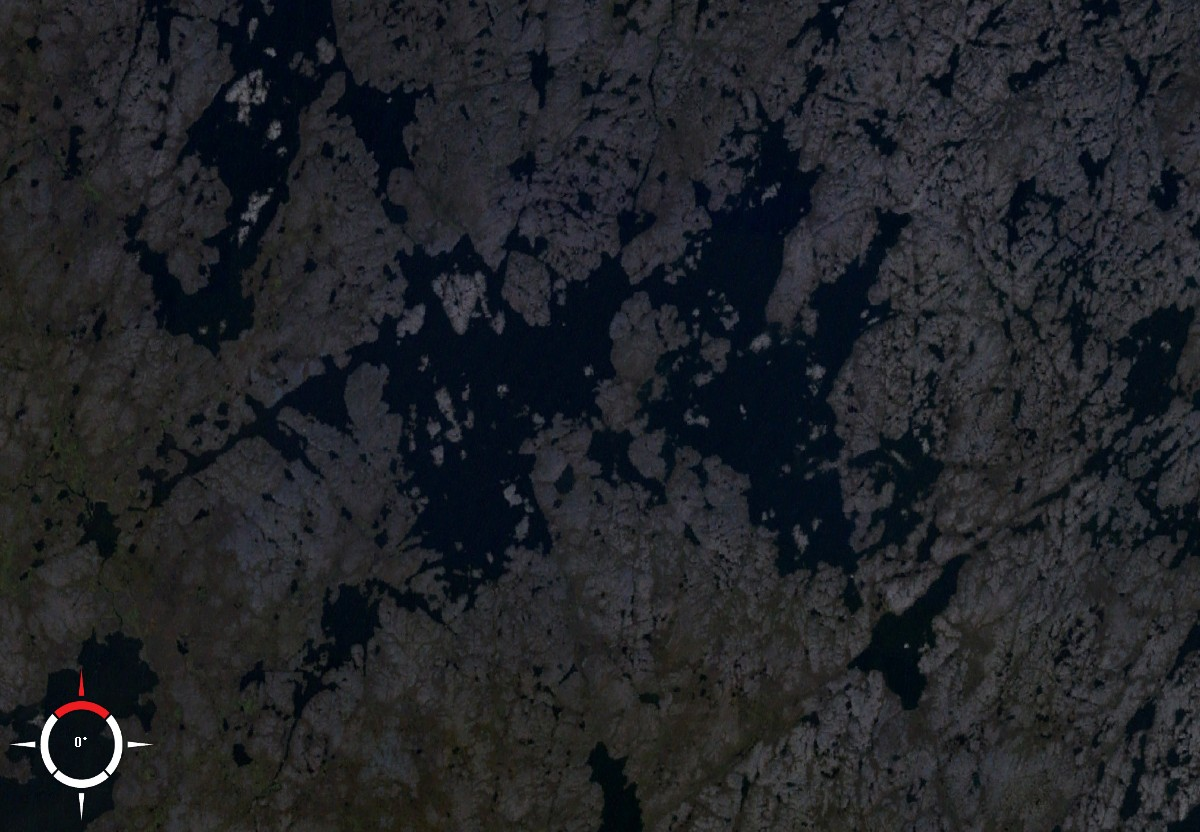

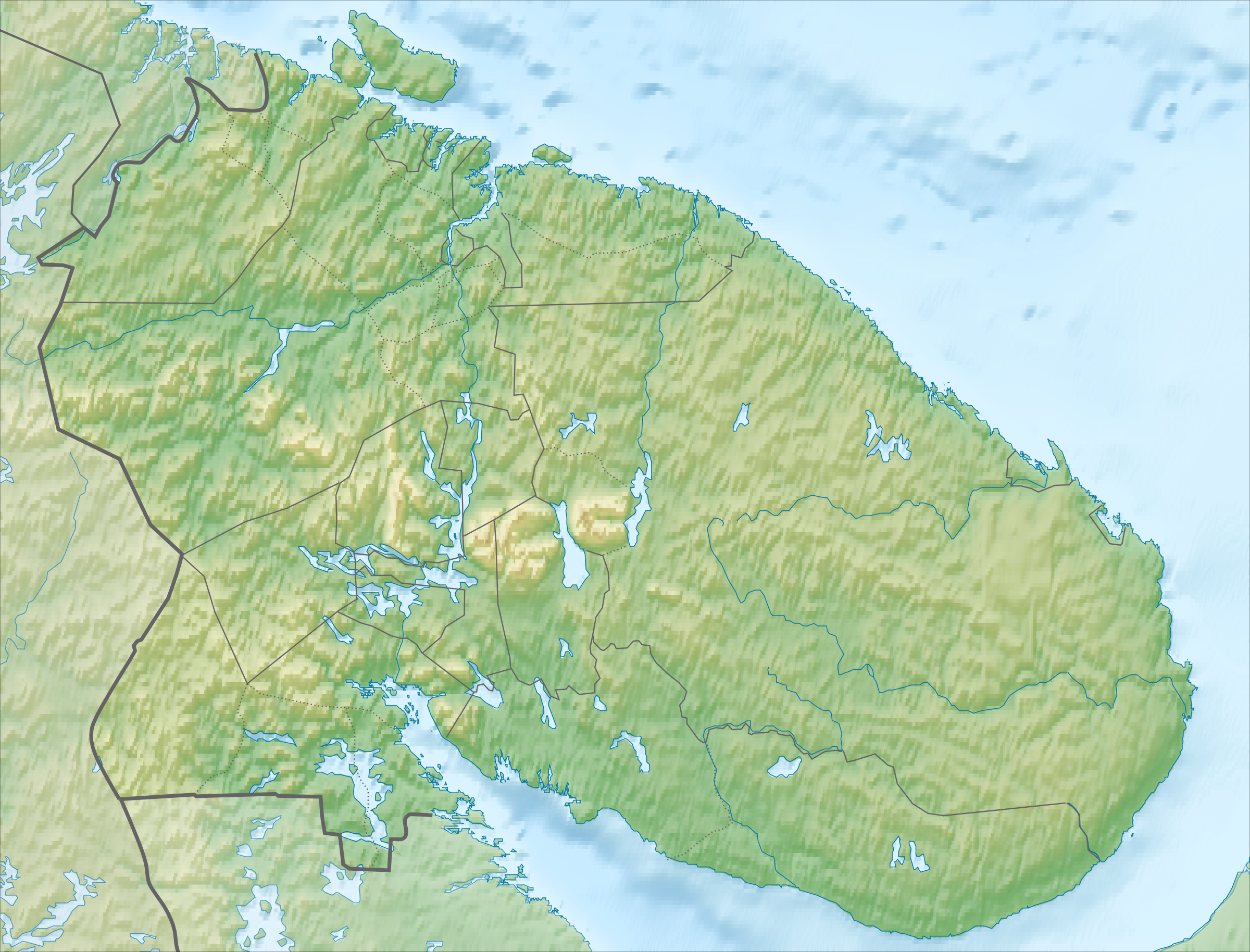
- Location within Murmansk Oblast Location within Russia
- Location: Kola Peninsula, Murmansk Oblast
- Coordinates: 68.1263889°N 38.0052778°E
- Primary outflows: Varzina River
- Basin countries: Russia
- Surface area: 94.4 km^{2} (36.4 sq mi)

Lake Yonozero (Russian: Ёнозеро) is a large freshwater lake on the Kola Peninsula, Murmansk Oblast, Russia. It has an area of 94.4 km^{2} (36.4 sq mi) (about 100 km^{2} or 39 sq mi with all the islands). Numerous small, uninhabited islands are found in the lake. Varzina River flows from the lake. Lake Yonozero marks the northern border of the Murmansk Tundra Reserve. The three-spined stickleback can be found in the lake, as well as in other surrounding lakes and rivers in eastern Murman.
