= Stepan Malygin =

Russian Arctic explorer (died 1764)

Stepan Gavrilovich Malygin (Russian: Степан Гаврилович Малыгин; died 1 August 1764) was a Russian Arctic explorer. Malygin Strait is named after him.

== Life ==
Malygin studied at the Moscow School of Mathematics and Navigation from 1711 to 1717. After his graduation, Malygin began his career as a naval cadet and was then promoted to the rank of lieutenant four years later. He served in the Baltic Fleet until 1735.

Malygin wrote the first Russian manual on navigation, titled Sokrashyonnaya navigatsiya po karte de-Reduktsion (Russian: Сокращённая навигация по карте де-Редукцион; 1733). In early 1736, Malygin was appointed leader of the western unit of the Second Kamchatka Expedition. In 1736–1737, two boats Pervy ('First') and Vtoroy ('Second') under the command of Malygin and A. Skuratov undertook a voyage from Dolgy Island in the Barents Sea to the mouth of the Ob River. Malygin explored this part of the Russian Arctic coastline on the trip and made a map of the area between the Pechora and Ob Rivers.

Between 1741 and 1748, Malygin was placed in charge of preparing navigators for the Russian Navy. In 1762, he was appointed head of the Admiralty office in Kazan.
