= Varnek =

Village on Vaygach Island, Nenets Autonomous Okrug

Varnek Ва́рнек
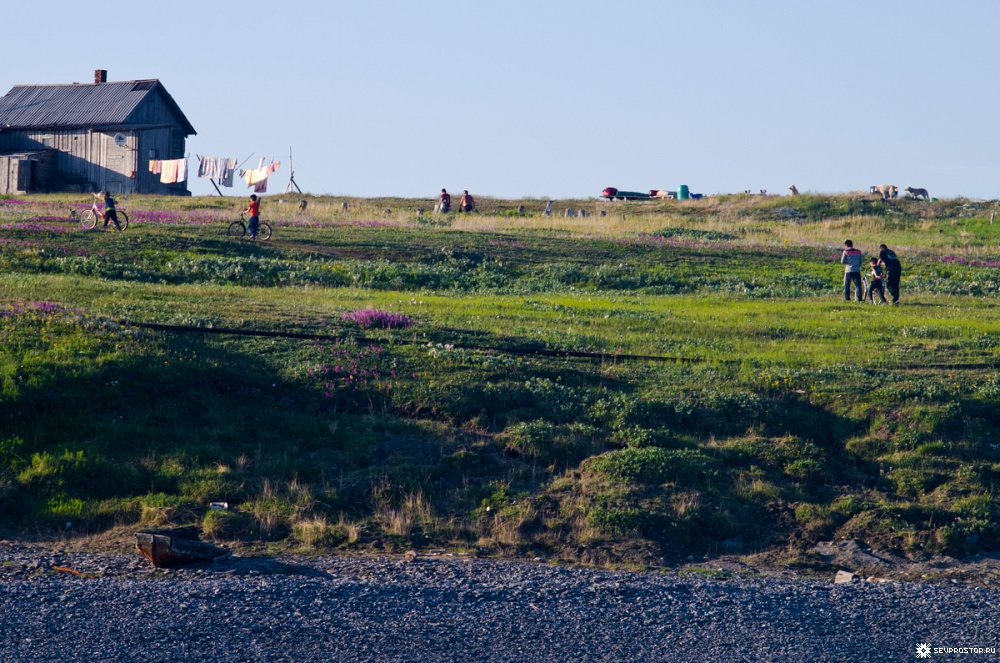
- Interactive map of Varnek
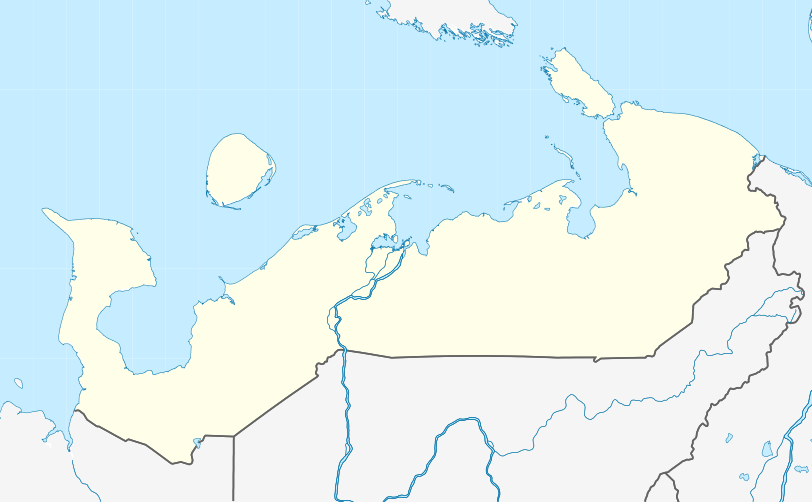
- Location of Varnek Varnek (Nenets Autonomous Okrug)
- Country: Russia
- Federal subject: Nenets Autonomous Okrug
- Founded: first half of the 1930s

Population (2010 Census)
  - Total: 101
  - Estimate (2021): 79 (−21.8%)
- Time zone: UTC+3 (MSK)
- Postal code: 166000
- Dialing code: +7 81857
- OKTMO ID: 11811479106

Varnek is a village on Vaygach Island of Zapolyarny District, Nenets Autonomous Okrug, Russia. It had a population of 101 as of 2010, an increase from its population of 94 in 2002.

== Geography ==
Varnek is located on the southern coast of Vaygach Island.

== History ==
In 1921, zinc-lead ores were found in the area, so a mine was established where prisoners of the Gulag worked. The settlement was established in the first half of the 1930s, named after Alexander Ivanovich Varnek, a Russian explorer of the Arctic. Varnek was the last village in Nenets Autonomous Okrug to be able to get phone calls, being introduced in 2011.

== Climate ==
Varnek has a subarctic climate (Dfc).
