= Varzina =

- Native name: Варзина (Russian)

Location
- Country: Russia
- Region: Murmansk Oblast

Physical characteristics
- Source: Lake Yenozero
  - elevation: 224 m (735 ft)
- Mouth: Barents Sea
  - coordinates: 68.3662°N 38.3677°E
  - elevation: 0 m (0 ft)
- Length: 35 km (22 mi)

The Varzina (Russian: Варзина) is a river in the north of the Kola Peninsula in Murmansk Oblast, Russia. It is 32 kilometres (20 mi) long, and has a drainage basin of 1,450 square kilometres (560 sq mi). The Varzina originates in the Lake Yenozero and flows into the Barents Sea. Its biggest tributary is the Penka. The river is famous for its sport fishing possibilities. The lower and middle sections both have a fishing camp, mainly for salmon fishing. The upper part of the river has the third camp. It is well-known for it brown trout fly fishing.
