= Dolgy Island =

Island in the Pechora Sea

Native name: о́стров До́лгий
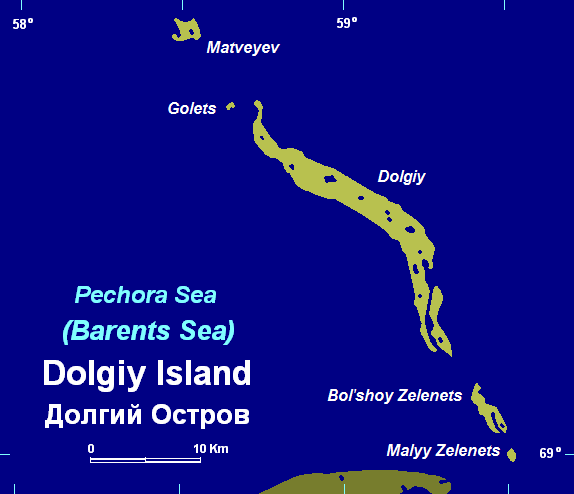
- Map of Dolgy and adjacent small islands

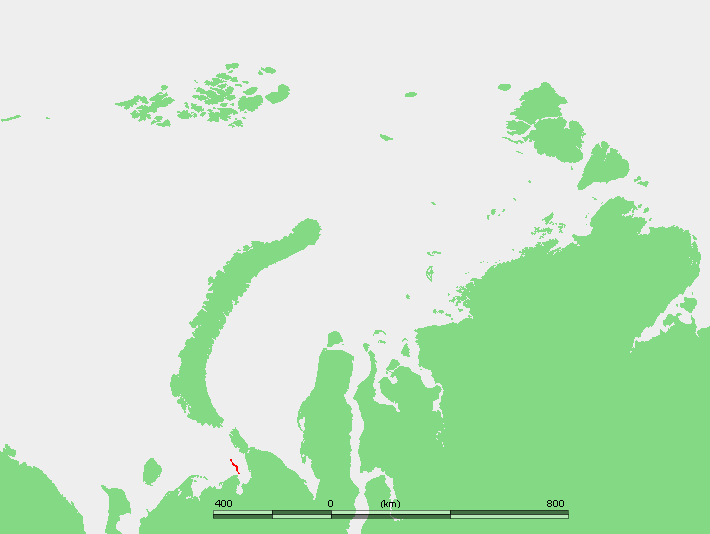
- Location of Dolgy Island in the Pechora Sea

Geography
- Location: Pechora Sea
- Coordinates: 69.250°N 59.067°E
- Area: 106 km^{2} (41 sq mi)
- Length: 38 km (23.6 mi)
- Width: 4 km (2.5 mi)

Administration
- Russia
- Oblast: Arkhangelsk Oblast
- Okrug: Nenets Autonomous Okrug

Dolgy Island (Russian: остров До́лгий, lit. 'Long Island') is an island in the Pechora Sea, northwest of the Khaypudyr Bay. The landscape of the island is relatively flat with small lakes and tundra patches.

This island should not be confused with other islands called "Dolgy", one of which is located in the Barents Sea itself in the bay southeast of Khodovarikha and the other in Karelia. Dikson Island was also formerly called "Dolgy".

== Description ==
Dolgy Island's southern tip is located only 12 kilometres (7.5 mi) from the West Siberian Plain mainland. Long and narrow, it stretches roughly from north-west to south-east and is 38 kilometres (24 mi) in length, with an average width of 2.8 kilometres (1.7 mi).

This island is administratively a part of Nenets Autonomous Okrug, an autonomous okrug of Arkhangelsk Oblast.

=== Adjacent islands ===
There are smaller islands in Dolgy's vicinity at both of its ends which are a prolongation of the same submarine structure.

- Matveyev Island, located in the north.
- Golets, a small islet located NW of the northern tip.
- Bolshoy Zelenets and Maly Zelenets, located in the south, between Dolgy and the mainland.

== History ==
Stepan Malygin undertook a voyage starting from Dolgy Island in 1736–1737. There were two ships in this early expedition, the Pervy, under Malygin and the Vtoroy under the command of captain A. Skuratov. After entering the little-explored Kara Sea, they sailed to the mouth of the Ob River.

Malygin took careful observations of these hitherto almost unknown areas of the Russian Arctic coastline. With this knowledge he was able to draw the first somewhat accurate map of the Arctic shores between the Pechora River and the Ob River.

== See also ==
- History of the Northern Sea Route
- Stepan Malygin

== Bibliography ==
- G. Gilbo: Sprawotschnik po istorii geografitscheskich naswani na pobereschje SSSR. Ministerstwo oborony Soiusa SSR, Glaw. upr. nawigazii i okeanografii, 1985, p. 101.
