= Vaygach Island =

Island in the Arctic Sea

Vaygach
Native name: Вайга́ч
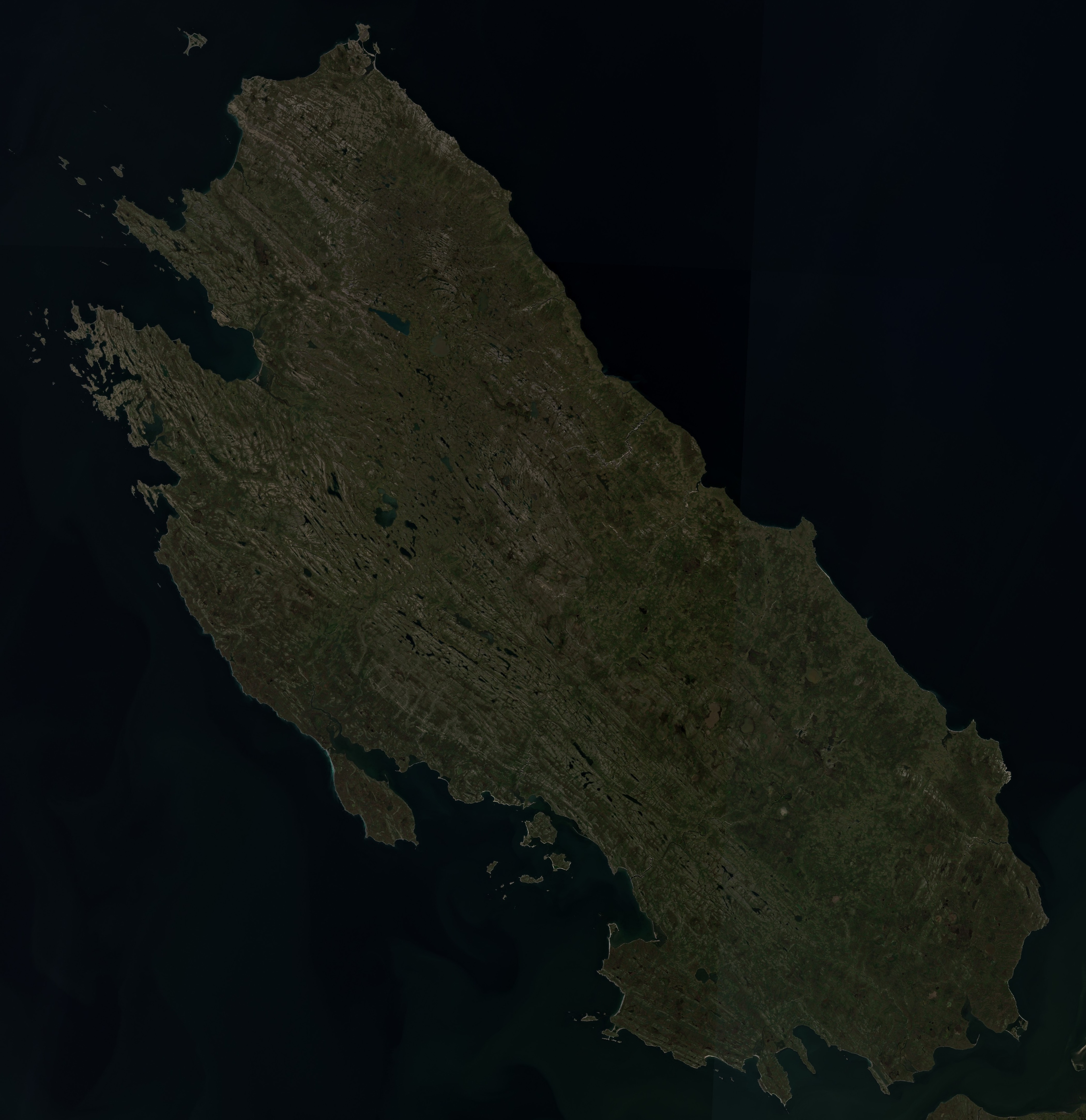
- A satellite image of the island

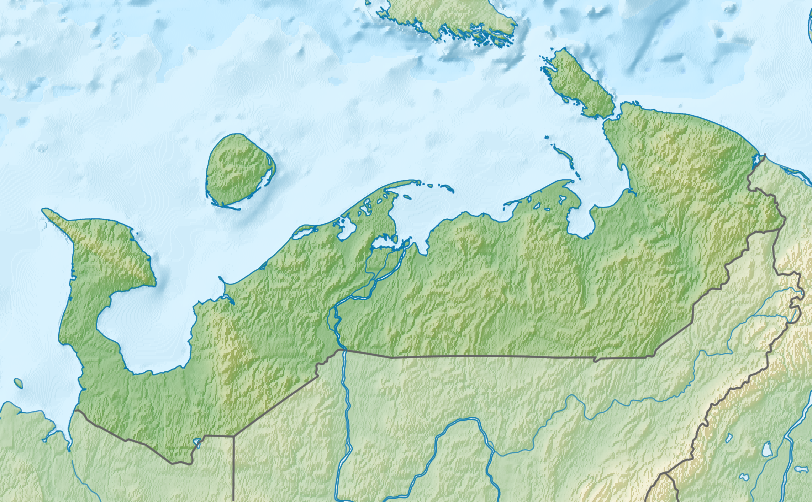
- Location within Nenets Autonomous Okrug

Geography
- Location: Arctic Sea
- Coordinates: 69°59′49″N 59°34′44″E
- Area: 3,383 km^{2} (1,306 sq mi)
- Length: 100 km (60 mi)
- Width: 45 km (28 mi)
- Highest elevation: 170 m (560 ft)
- Highest point: Gora Bolvanskaya

Administration
- Russia
- Oblast: Arkhangelsk Oblast
- Okrug: Nenets Autonomous Okrug

Demographics
- Population: 106 (2012)
- Pop. density: 0,03/km^{2} (8/sq mi)
- Ethnic groups: Nenets, Russians

Vaygach Island (Russian: Вайга́ч, romanized: Vajgač) is an island in the Arctic Sea between the Pechora Sea and the Kara Sea.

== Geography ==
Vaygach Island is separated from the Yugorsky Peninsula in the mainland by the Yugorsky Strait and from Novaya Zemlya by the Kara Strait. The island is a part of Nenets Autonomous Okrug of Arkhangelsk Oblast, Russia.

- Area: 3,383 square kilometres (1,306 sq mi)
- Length: ~ 100 kilometres (62 mi)
- Width: up to 45 kilometres (28 mi)
- Average temperatures: −20 °C (−4 °F) (February), 5 °C (41 °F) (June)
- Highest point: 170 metres (560 ft)

Vaygach Island is mainly formed of argillaceous slates, sandstone, and limestone. There are many rivers about 20–40 kilometres (12–25 mi) in length, swamps, and small lakes on the island. For the most part it consists of tundra. Slight rocky ridges run generally along its length, and the coast has low cliffs in places. The island consists mostly of limestone, and its elevation above the sea is geologically recent. Raised beaches are frequent. The rocks are heavily scored by ice, but this was probably marine ice, not that of glaciers. The only settlement on the island is Varnek.

== Environment ==
=== Flora and fauna ===
Grasses, mosses and Arctic flowering plants are abundant, but there are no trees excepting occasional dwarf willows.

Foxes and lemmings are spotted occasionally, and at least five polar bears are known to inhabit the island. While there are few land animals, birds are numerous; a variety of waterbirds and waders frequent the marshes and lakes. The island regularly supports significant populations of bean, barnacle and greater white-fronted geese, tundra swans, long-tailed ducks, goosanders, snowy owls and peregrine falcons. It has been recognised as an Important Bird Area (IBA) by BirdLife International.

=== Nature reserve ===
In July 2007, the World Wide Fund for Nature (WWF) and the Russian government approved a nature reserve on Vaygach island. The island's surrounding seas are home to many marine mammals such as walruses, seals and endangered whales.

== Ethnography ==
The name of the island translates from the Nenets as "alluvial shore", or by another account Vaygach means ‘terrible death’ or ‘territory of death’ in the local language.

Until the 19th century, the island was an important shrine of the Nenets people. On the island of Vaygach since ancient times, two idols were worshiped. One, named Vesako, on the south end of the island. The other on the north is Hadako. There were also polycephalic wooden idols painted with blood of holy animals, primarily reindeer. Some of their sacrificial piles, consisting of drift-wood, deer's horns and the skulls of bears and deer, have been observed by travellers. In spite of their conversion to Christianity, the Nenets still regard these piles with superstition.

== See also ==
- List of islands of Russia
