= Yugorsky Peninsula =

Peninsula in Nenets Autonomous Okrug, Russia

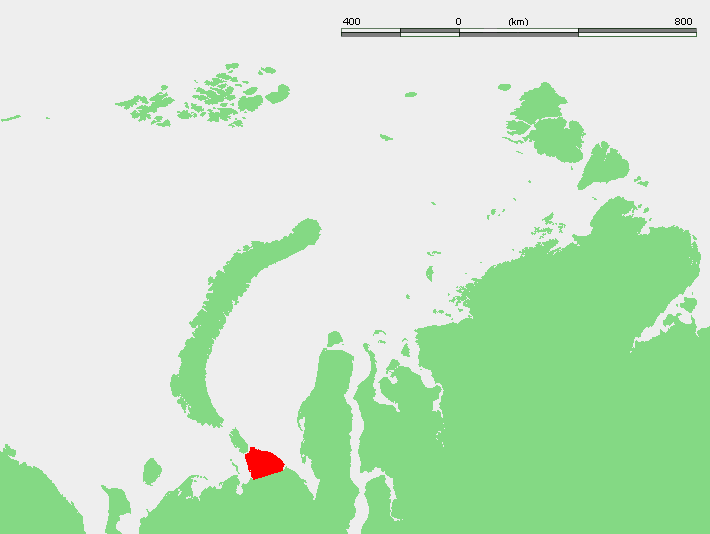
- Location of the Yugorsky Peninsula.

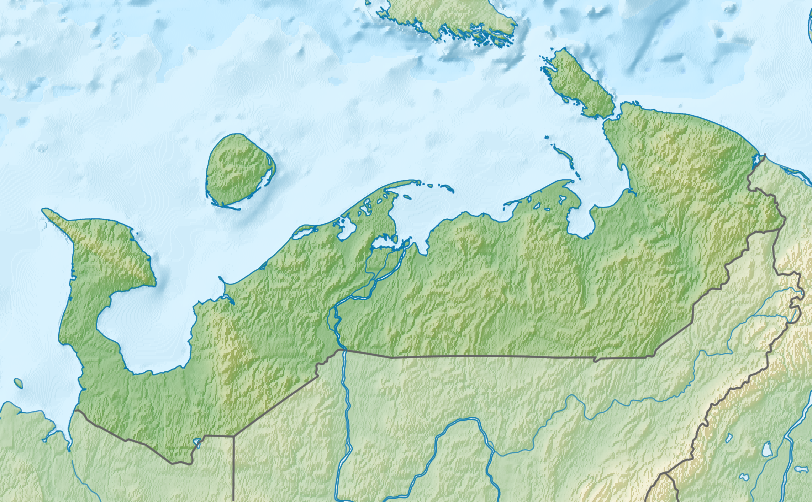
- Location within Nenets Autonomous Okrug Location within European Russia

Geography
- Location: Nenets Autonomous Okrug, Russia
- Coordinates: 69°28′N 61°31′E
- Adjacent to: Pechora Sea, Kara Sea

Administration
- Russia

The Yugorsky Peninsula (Russian: Югорский полуостров) is a large peninsula in Nenets Autonomous Okrug, Russia. It is limited by the Khaypudyr Bay in the Pechora Sea to the west and by the Baydaratsk Bay in the Kara Sea to the north and east.

Compared to the Barents Sea, which receives relatively warm currents from the Atlantic Ocean, the Kara Sea is much colder, remaining frozen for over nine months a year. Thus often, in the spring and in the fall, the eastern coast of the Yugorsky Peninsula is frozen, while its western coast is clear of ice.

The Yugorsky Strait and, beyond it, Vaygach Island lie at the northwestern end of this peninsula. The Pay-Khoy Ridge occupies the peninsula and extends from northwest to southeast.

In the southeastern end of the Yugorsky Peninsula lies the Kara meteorite crater, while the Ust-Kara site lies offshore, 15 km east of the small Kara or Karskaya Guba inlet. It was formerly believed that these two sites were two separate craters and that they formed a twin impact structure from a large-scale meteorite hit in the late Cretaceous. However, it seems that the Ust-Kara site does not exist as a separate site. Apparently, the suevite outcrops of the Ust-Kara impact structure are only a part of the Kara impact structure. (Hodge 1994 and NASA 1988)
