= Kara Strait =

Strait connecting the Kara Sea and the Barents Sea in northern Russia

Coordinates: 70°30′N 58°0′E

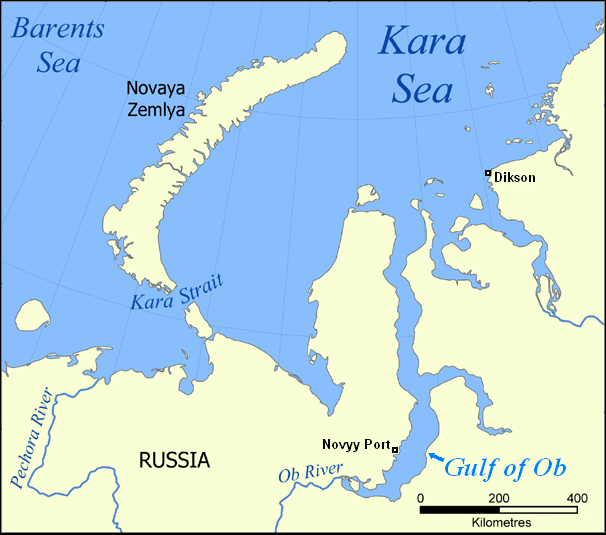
A map showing the location of the Kara Strait.

The Kara Strait or Kara Gates (Russian: Карские Ворота, romanized: Karskiye Vorota) is a 56 km (35 mi) wide channel of water between the southern end of Novaya Zemlya and the northern tip of Vaygach Island. This strait connects the Kara Sea and the Barents Sea in northern Russia.

== Hydrography and climate ==
The sailing conditions of the Kara Strait were explored by Christian Dahl in the 1870s. The coastline on both sides of the Kara Gate is high and rocky. The strait has a length of 33 km and a smallest width of 50 km; the depth varies from 7 m on the Perseus Shoal to 230 m in its eastern part. Along its middle part there is a hollow no more than 5 km wide with depths of over 100 m.

The water temperature in the strait does not exceed 13.5 °C. Its average temperature here is 0.9 °C. Usually the strait is covered with ice for most of the year, but in warm years, with the strong influence of the warm Gulf Stream, it can be ice-free for most of the winter. To the west of the Kara Gate is the southeastern part of the Pechora Sea, which freezes in winter when the influence of Atlantic cyclones and warm currents in the Barents Sea weakens. The presence or absence of ice cover in the strait usually coincides with its presence in the Pechora Sea to the west-southwest of it.

== Northern Sea Route ==
Due to its location south of the Novaya Zemlya archipelago, the Kara Gate Strait is one of the passages of the Northern Sea Route, but due to the highly curved shape of this group of islands, with their western coast usually ice-free, passage through it may be less convenient compared to the northern one route to Cape Chelyuskin, including due to the greater length of the route in this case.
